= Protist classification =

Classification of eukaryotes

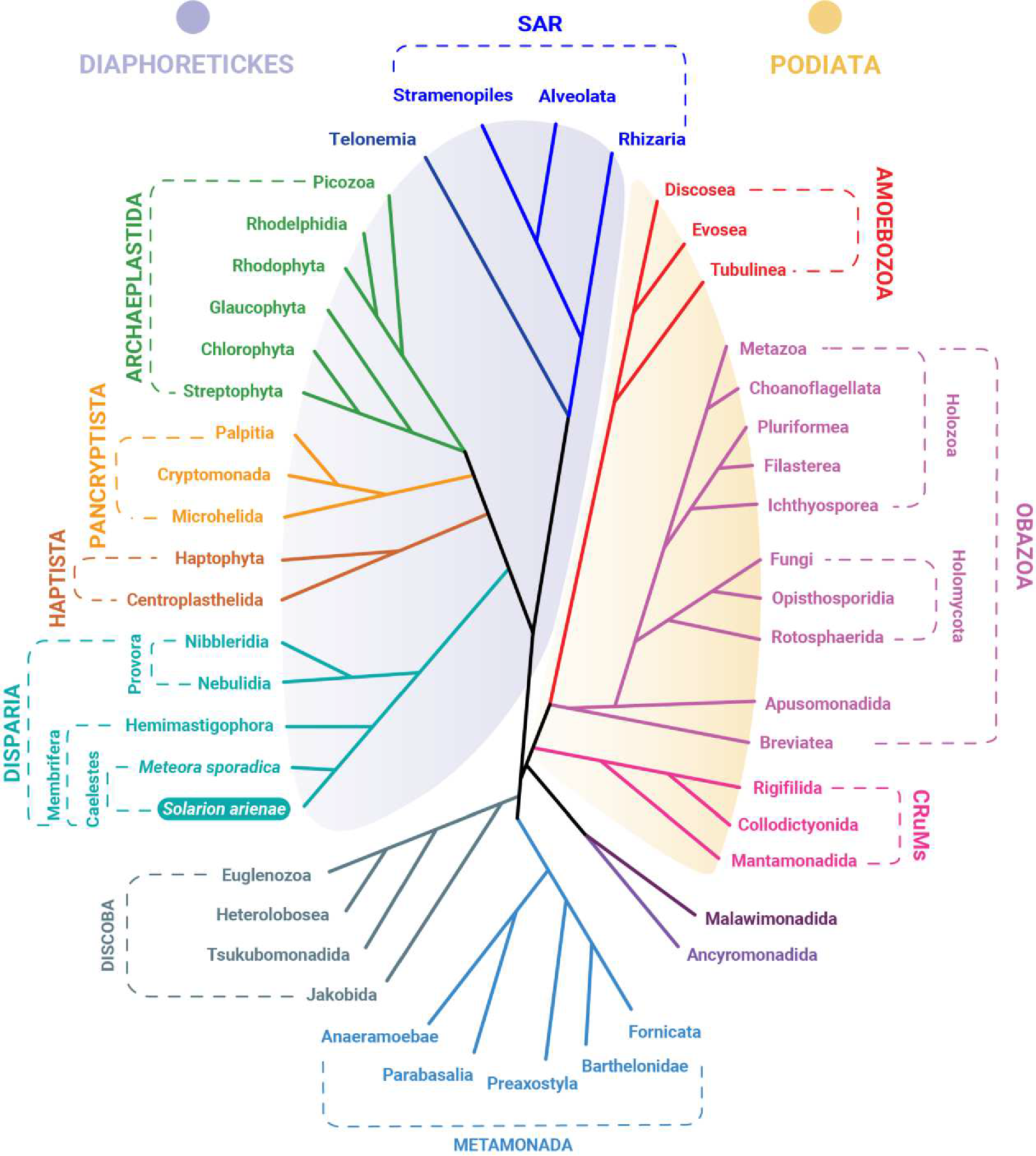
Phylogenomic tree of eukaryotes, as regarded in 2025.

A protist (/ˈproʊtɪst/) is any eukaryotic organism (one with cells containing a nucleus) that is not an animal, plant, or fungus. The protists do not form a natural group, or clade, since they exclude certain eukaryotes with whom they share a common ancestor; (Note: The first eukaryotes were "neither plants, animals, nor fungi", hence as defined, the Protista would include the earliest common ancestor of all eukaryotes.) but, like algae or invertebrates, the grouping is used for convenience. In some systems of biological classification, such as the five-kingdom scheme proposed by Robert Whittaker in 1969, the protists make up a kingdom called Protista, composed of "organisms which are unicellular or unicellular-colonial and which form no tissues". (Note: In the original 4-kingdom model proposed in 1959, Protista included all unicellular microorganisms such as bacteria.) In the 21st century, the classification shifted toward a phylogenetic classification of protists.

The following groups contain protists. The clade Opisthokonta also contains the animals and the fungi, and the Archaeplastida also contains plants.

== Cavalier-Smith's classification ==
Thomas Cavalier-Smith and his collaborators use a fully rank-based classification of protists. Here is their classification, non-protists are shown in bold:

Extended content
- Superkingdom Corticata
  - Kingdom Chromista
    - Subkingdom Hacrobia
      - Phylum Cryptista
        - Subphylum Endohelia
          - Class Endohelea
            - Order Axomonadida
            - Order Microhelida
        - Subphylum Palpitia
          - Class Palpitea
            - Order Palpitida
        - Subphylum Rollomonadia
          - Superclass Cryptomonada
            - Class Cryptophyceae
              - Order Cryptomonadales
              - Order Pyrenomonadales
              - Order Tetragonidiales
            - Class Goniomonadea
              - Order Goniomonadida
              - Order Hemiarmida
          - Superclass Leucocrypta
            - Class Leucocryptea
              - Order Kathablepharida
      - Phylum Haptista
        - Subphylum Alveidia
          - Class Alveidea
        - Subphylum Haptophytina
          - Class Coccolithophyceae
            - Order Coccolithales
            - Order Coccosphaerales
            - Order Isochrysidales
            - Order Phaeocystales
            - Order Prymnesiales
            - Order Syracosphaerales
            - Order Zygodiscales
          - Class Pavlovophyceae
            - Order Pavlovales
          - Class Rappephyceae
        - Subphylum Heliozoa
          - Class Centrohelea
            - Order Acanthocystida
            - Order Pterocystida
    - Subkingdom Harosa
      - Infrakingdom Halvaria
        - Superphylum Alveolata
          - Phylum Ciliophora
            - Subphylum Intramacronucleata
              - Infraphylum Protocruzia
                - Class Protocruzea
              - Infraphylum Spirotrichia
                - Class Armophorea
                  - Order Armophorida
                  - Order Clevelandellida
                - Class Cariacotrichea
                  - Order Cariacotrichida
                - Class Litostomatea
                  - Subclass Haptoria
                    - Order Cyclotrichiida
                    - Order Haptorida
                    - Order Pleurostomatida
                  - Subclass Trichostomatia
                    - Order Entodiniomorphida
                    - Order Macropodiniida
                    - Order Vestibuliferida
                - Class Spirotrichea
                  - Subclass Choreotrichia
                    - Order Tintinnida
                  - Subclass Hypotrichia
                    - Order Euplotida
                    - Order Kiitrichida
                  - Subclass Licnophoria
                    - Order Licnophorida
                  - Subclass Oligotrichia
                    - Order Strombidiida
                  - Subclass Protocruziidia
                    - Order Phacodiniida
                    - Order Protocruziida
                  - Subclass Stichotrichia
                    - Order Sporadotrichida
                    - Order Stichotrichida
                    - Order Urostylida
              - Infraphylum Ventrata
                - Class Colpodea
                  - Subclass Nassophoria
                    - Order Colpodidiida
                    - Order Microthoracida
                    - Order Nassulida
                    - Order Synhymeniida
                  - Order Bryometopida
                  - Order Bryophryida
                  - Order Bursariomorphida
                  - Order Colpodida
                  - Order Cyrtolophosidida
                  - Order Sorogenida
                - Class Oligohymenophorea
                  - Subclass Apostomatia
                    - Order Apostomatida
                    - Order Astomatophorida
                    - Order Pilisuctorida
                  - Subclass Astomatia
                    - Order Astomatida
                  - Subclass Hymenostomatia
                    - Order Ophyroglenida
                    - Order Tetrahymenida
                - Class Phyllopharyngea
                  - Subclass Chonotrichia
                    - Order Cryptogemmida
                    - Order Exogemmiida
                  - Subclass Cyrtophoria
                    - Order Chlamydodontida
                    - Order Dysteriida
                  - Subclass Rhynchodia
                    - Order Hypocomatida
                    - Order Rhynchodida
                - Class Plagiopylea
                  - Order Odontostomatida
                  - Order Plagiopylida
                - Class Prostomatea
                  - Order Prorodontida
                  - Order Prostomatida
            - Subphylum Postciliodesmatophora
              - Class Heterotrichea
                - Order Heterotrichida
              - Class Karyorelictea
                - Order Loxodida
                - Order Protoheterotrichida
                - Order Protostomatida
          - Phylum Miozoa
            - Subphylum Myzozoa
              - Infraphylum Apicomplexa
                - Parvphylum Apicomonada
                  - Class Apicomonadea
                    - Subclass Myzomonadia
                      - Superorder Chromovoridia
                        - Order Algovorida
                        - Order Chromerida
                        - Order Voracida
                        - Order Voromonadida
                      - Superorder Paraconoidia
                        - Order Colpodellida
                    - Subclass Vitrelloidia
                      - Order Vitrellida
                - Parvphylum Sporozoa
                  - Class Coccidiomorphea
                    - Subclass Coccidia
                      - Order Adeleida
                      - Order Eimeriida
                      - Order Ixorheida
                    - Subclass Hematozoa
                      - Superorder Aconoidia
                        - Order Nephromycida
                        - Order Piroplasmida
                      - Superorder Haemosporidia
                        - Order Haemosporida
                  - Class Gregarinomorphea
                    - Subclass Cryptogregaria
                      - Order Cryptogregarida
                    - Subclass Histogregaria
                      - Order Histogregarida
                    - Subclass Orthogregarinia
                      - Order Arthrogregarida
                      - Order Vermigregarida
                  - Class Paragregarea
                    - Order Archigregarinida
                    - Order Stenophorida
                    - Order Velocida
                  - Order Blastogregarinida
              - Infraphylum Dinozoa
                - Parvphylum Dinoflagellata
                  - Superclass Dinokaryota
                    - Class Peridinea
                      - Subclass Dinophycidae
                        - Infraclass Epidinia
                          - Order Torodinida
                        - Infraclass Gymnodinoidia
                          - Order Gymnodiniales
                          - Order Spirodinida
                        - Infraclass Peridinoidia
                          - Order Peridiniales
                          - Order Prorocentrales
                        - Order Actiniscales
                        - Order Blastodinales
                        - Order Coccidinales
                        - Order Dinamoebales
                        - Order Dinophysidales
                        - Order Gonyaulacales
                        - Order Lophodinales
                        - Order Nannoceratopsales
                        - Order Pyrocystales
                        - Order Thoracosphaerales
                      - Subclass Karlodinia
                    - Class Noctilucea
                      - Order Noctilucida
                    - Class Sulcodinea
                      - Order Amphidinida
                      - Order Gyrodinida
                  - Superclass Eodina
                    - Class Myzodinea
                      - Order Myzodinida
                    - Class Oxyrrhea
                      - Order Oxyrrhida
                  - Superclass Syndina
                    - Class Ellobiopsea
                      - Order Ellobiopsida
                    - Class Endodinea
                      - Order Ichthyodinida
                    - Class Syndinea
                      - Order Syndinida
                - Parvphylum Perkinsozoa
                  - Class Perkinsea
                    - Order Perkinsida
                    - Order Rastrimonadida
                    - Order Acrocoelida
                  - Class Squirmidea
                    - Order Squirmida
            - Subphylum Protalveolata
              - Class Acavomonadea
                - Order Acavomonadida
              - Class Colponemea
                - Order Colponemida
                - Order Palustrimonadida
        - Superphylum Heterokonta
          - Phylum Bigyra
            - Subphylum Opalozoa
              - Infraphylum Bikosia
                - Class Bikosea
                  - Subclass Bicosidia
                    - Order Anoecida
                    - Order Bicoecida
                    - Order Borokida
                    - Order Pseudodendromonadida
                  - Subclass Rictidia
                    - Order Rictida
              - Infraphylum Placidozoa
                - Superclass Opalinata
                  - Class Blastocystea
                    - Order Blastocystida
                  - Class Opalinea
                    - Order Opalinida
                    - Order Proteromonadida
                - Superclass Wobblata
                  - Class Nanomonadea
                    - Order Uniciliatida
                  - Class Opalomonadea
                  - Class Placididea
                    - Order Placidida
            - Subphylum Sagenista
              - Class Eogyrea
                - Order Eogyrida
              - Class Labyrinthulea
                - Order Amphitremida
                - Order Labyrinthulida
                - Order Thraustochytriida
            - Class Platysulcea
              - Order Platysulcida
          - Phylum Gyrista
            - Subphylum Bigyromonada
              - Class Developea
                - Order Developayellida
              - Class Pirsonea
                - Order Pirsoniida
            - Subphylum Ochrophytina
              - Infraphylum Chrysista
                - Superclass Fucistia
                  - Class Aurophyceae
                    - Order Aurearenales
                    - Order Phaeothamniales
                  - Class "Chrysomerophyceae"
                    - Order Chrysomeridales
                  - Class Phaeophyceae
                    - Subclass Melanophycidae
                      - Order Ascoseirales
                      - Order Asterocladales
                      - Order Desmarestiales
                      - Order Discosporangiales
                      - Order Ectocarpales
                      - Order Fucales
                      - Order Ishigeales
                      - Order Laminariales
                      - Order Nemodermatales
                      - Order Phaeosiphoniellales
                      - Order Ralfsiales
                      - Order Scytothamnales
                      - Order Sporochnales
                      - Order Syringodermatales
                      - Order Tilopteridales
                    - Subclass Schizocladiophycidae
                      - Order Schizocladiales
                  - Class Xanthophyceae
                    - Order Mischococcales
                    - Order Pleurochloridellales
                    - Order Tribonematales
                    - Order Vaucheriales
                - Superclass Limnistia
                  - Class Chrysomonadea
                    - Order Chloramoebales
                    - Order Chromulinales
                    - Order Chrysosphaerales
                    - Order Heterogloeales
                    - Order Hibberdiales
                    - Order Hydrurales
                    - Order Ochromonadales
                    - Order Paraphysomonadida
                    - Order Synurales
                    - Order Thallochrysidales
                  - Class Eustigmatophyceae
                    - Order Eustigmatales
                  - Class Picophagea
                    - Order Picophagales
                    - Order Synchromales
                - Superclass Raphidoistia
                  - Class Raphidomonadea
                    - Subclass Raphidophycidae
                      - Order Raphidomonadales
                    - Subclass Raphopoda
                      - Order Actinophryida
                      - Order Commatiida
              - Infraphylum Diatomista
                - Superclass Hypogyrista
                  - Class Dictyochophyceae
                    - Subclass Pedinellia
                      - Order Dictyochales
                      - Order Pedinellales
                    - Subclass Pelagophycidae
                      - Order Pelagomonadales
                      - Order Sarcinochrysidales
                    - Subclass Sulcophycidae
                      - Order Olisthodiscales
                  - Class Pinguiophyceae
                    - Order Pinguiochrysidales
                - Superclass Khakista
                  - Class Bolidophyceae
                    - Order Parmales
                  - Class Diatomeae
                    - Subclass Bacillariophycidae
                    - Subclass Corethrophycidae
                    - Subclass Eucentricophycidae
                    - Subclass Rhizosoleniophycidae
            - Subphylum Pseudofungi
              - Class Hyphochytrea
                - Order Hyphochytriida
              - Class Oomycetes
                - Subclass Eogamia
                  - Order Anisolpidiales
                  - Order Haptoglossales
                  - Order Lagenismatales
                  - Order Olpidiopsidales
                  - Order Rozellopsidales
                - Subclass Peronosporidae
                  - Order Peronosporales
                  - Order Pythiales
                  - Order Rhipidiales
                - Subclass Saprolegniidae
                  - Order Albuginales
                  - Order Leptomitales
                  - Order Salilagenidiales
                  - Order Saprolegniales
      - Infrakingdom Rhizaria
        - Phylum Cercozoa
          - Subphylum Monadofilosa
            - Superclass Eoglissa
              - Class Helkesea
                - Order Helkesida
              - Class Metromonadea
                - Order Metromonadida
                - Order Metopiida
            - Superclass Ventrifilosa
              - Class Imbricatea
                - Subclass Krakenia
                  - Order Krakenida
                - Subclass Placonuda
                  - Superorder Discomonada
                    - Order Discomonadida
                  - Superorder Euglyphia
                    - Order Euglyphida
                    - Order Zoelucasida
                  - Superorder Nudisarca
                    - Order Marimonadida
                    - Order Variglissida
                - Subclass Placoperla
                  - Superorder Perlatia
                    - Order Perlofilida
                    - Order Spongomonadida
                  - Superorder Placofila
                    - Order Discocelida
                    - Order Thaumatomonadida
              - Class Sarcomonadea
                - Subclass Paracercomonadia
                  - Order Paracercomonadida
                - Subclass Pediglissa
                  - Order Cercomonadida
                  - Order Glissomonadida
              - Class Thecofilosea
                - Subclass Eothecia
                  - Order Ebriida
                  - Order Cryomonadida
                  - Order Matazida
                - Subclass Phaeodaria
                  - Order Eodarida
                  - Order Opaloconchida
                - Subclass Tectosia
                  - Order Tectofilosida
                - Subclass Ventricleftia
                  - Order Ventricleftida
          - Subphylum Reticulofilosa
            - Class Chlorarachnea
              - Order Chlorarachnida
              - Order Minorisida
            - Class Granofilosea
              - Order Cryptofilida
              - Order Desmothoracida
              - Order Heliomonadida
              - Order Leucodictyida
              - Order Limnofilida
            - Class Skiomonadea
              - Order Aquavolonida
              - Order Tremulida
        - Phylum Retaria
          - Subphylum Ectoreta
            - Infraphylum Foraminifera
              - Class Globothalamea
                - Order Carterinida
                - Order Globeriginida
                - Order Lagenida
                - Order Lituolida
                - Order Lofusiida
                - Order Robertinida
                - Order Rotaliida
                - Order Testulariida
                - Order Trochamminida
              - Class Monothalamea
                - Order Allogromiida
                - Order Astrorhizida
                - Order Psamminida
                - Order Stannomida
              - Class Tubothalamea
                - Order Miliolida
                - Order Spirillinida
            - Infraphylum Radiozoa
              - Class Acantharea
                - Order Acanthoplegmida
                - Order Arthracanthida
                - Order Chaunacanthida
                - Order Holacanthida
              - Class Polycystinea
                - Order Collodarida
                - Order Nassellaria
                - Order Spumellaria
            - Infraphylum Sticholonchia
              - Class Sticholonchea
                - Order Taxopodida
          - Subphylum Endomyxa
            - Superclass Marimxyia
              - Class Ascetosporea
                - Order Claustrosporida
                - Order Haplosporida
                - Order Mikrocytida
                - Order Paradinida
                - Order Paramyxida
              - Class Gromiidea
                - Order Gromiida
                - Order Reticulosida
            - Superclass Proteomyxia
              - Class Phytomyxea
                - Order Phagomyxida
                - Order Plasmodiophorida
              - Class Vampyrellidea
                - Order Vampyrellida
        - Order Pseudosporida
      - Infrakingdom Telonemia
        - Phylum Telonemia
          - Class Telonemea
            - Order Telonemida
  - Kingdom Plantae
    - Subkingdom Biliphyta
      - Infrakingdom Rhodaria
        - Phylum Pararhoda
          - Class Picomonadea
            - Order Picomonadida
          - Class Rhodelphea
            - Order Rhodelphales
        - Phylum Rhodophyta
          - Subphylum Cyanidiophytina
            - Class Cyanidiophyceae
              - Order Cyanidiales
          - Subphylum Eurhodophytina
            - Class Bangiophyceae
              - Order Bangiales
              - Order Goniotrichales
            - Class Florideophyceae
              - Subclass Ahnfeltiophycidae
                - Order Ahnfeltiales
                - Order Pihiellales
              - Subclass Corallinophycidae
                - Order Corallinales
                - Order Rhodogorgonales
                - Order Sporolithales
              - Subclass Hildenbrandiophyceae
                - Order Hildenbrandiales
              - Subclass Nemaliophycidae
                - Order Acrochaetiales
                - Order Balbianiales
                - Order Balliales
                - Order Batrachospermales
                - Order Colaconematales
                - Order Entwisleiales
                - Order Nemaliales
                - Order Palmariales
                - Order Thoreales
              - Subclass Rhodymeniophycidae
                - Order Acrosymphytales
                - Order Bonnemaisoniales
                - Order Ceramiales
                - Order Gelidiales
                - Order Gigartinales
                - Order Gracilariales
                - Order Halymeniales
                - Order Nemastomatales
                - Order Peyssonneliales
                - Order Plocamiales
                - Order Rhodymeniales
                - Order Sebdeniales
              - Order Rhodachlyales
          - Subphylum Metarhodophytina
            - Class Compsopogonophyceae
              - Order Compsopogonales
              - Order Erythropeltidales
              - Order Rhodochaetales
          - Subphylum Rhodellophytina
            - Class Porphyridiophyceae
              - Order Porphyridiales
            - Class Rhodellophyceae
              - Order Dixoniellales
              - Order Glaucosphaerales
              - Order Rhodellales
            - Class Stylonematophyceae
              - Order Rufusiales
              - Order Stylonematales
      - Phylum Glaucophyta
        - Class Glaucophyceae
          - Order Glaucocystales
    - Subkingdom Viridiplantae
      - Infrakingdom Chlorophyta
        - Phylum Chlorophyta
          - Subphylum Chlorophytina
            - Class Chlorodendrophyceae
              - Order Chlorodendrales
            - Class Chlorophyceae
              - Order Chaetopeltidales
              - Order Chaetophorales
              - Order Chlamydomonadales
              - Order Oedogoniales
              - Order Sphaeropleales
            - Class Pedinophyceae
              - Order Marsupiomonadales
              - Order Pedinomonadales
              - Order Scourfieldiales
            - Class Trebouxiophyceae
              - Order Chlorellales
              - Order Microthamniales
              - Order Phyllsiphonales
              - Order Prasiolales
              - Order Trebouxiales
            - Class Ulvophyceae
              - Order Bryopsidales
              - Order Cladophorales
              - Order Dasycladales
              - Order Oltmansiellopsidales
              - Order Scotinosphaerales
              - Order Trentepohliales
              - Order Ulotrichales
              - Order Ulvales
          - Subphylum Prasinophytina
            - Class Mamiellophyceae
              - Order Dolichomastigales
              - Order Mamiellales
              - Order Monomastigales
            - Class Nephrophyceae
              - Order Nephroselmidales
            - Class Pyramimonadophyceae
              - Order Palmophyllales
              - Order Prasinococcales
              - Order Pseudoscourfieldiales
              - Order Pyramimonadales
      - Infrakingdom Streptophyta
        - Superphylum Charophyta
          - Phylum Charophyta
            - Class Charophyceae
              - Order Charales
            - Class Chlorokybophyceae
              - Order Chlorokybales
            - Class Coleochaetophyceae
              - Order Chaetosphaeridiales
              - Order Coleochaetales
            - Class Conjugatophyceae
              - Order Desmidiales
              - Order Zygnematales
            - Class Klebsormidiophyceae
              - Order Klebsormidiales
            - Class Mesostigmatophyceae
              - Order Mesostigmatales
        - **Superphylum Embryophyta**
- Kingdom Protozoa
  - Subkingdom Malawimonada
    - Phylum Malawimonada
      - Class Malawimonadea
        - Order Malawimonadida
  - Subkingdom Natozoa
    - Infrakingdom Archezoa
      - Phylum Metamonada
        - Subphylum Anaeromonada
          - Class Anaeromonadea
            - Order Oxymonadida
            - Order Paratrimastigida
            - Order Trimastigida
        - Subphylum Trichozoa
          - Infraphylum Fornicata
            - Class Carpomonadea
              - Order Carpediemonadida
              - Order Chilomastigida
              - Order Dysnectida
            - Class Eopharyngea
              - Order Diplomonadida
              - Order Retortamonadida
          - Infraphylum Parabasalia
            - Class Trichomonadea
              - Order Cristamonadida
              - Order Spirotrichonymphida
              - Order Trichomonadida
              - Order Tritrichomonadida
            - Class Trichonymphea
              - Order Lophomonadida
              - Order Trichonymphida
    - Infrakingdom Eozoa
      - Superphylum Discicristata
        - Phylum Euglenozoa
          - Subphylum Euglenoida
            - Infraphylum Dipilida
              - Superclass Rigimonada
                - Class Ploeotarea
                  - Order Ploeotiida
                - Class Stavomonadea
                  - Subclass Heterostavia
                    - Order Heterostavida
                  - Subclass Homostavia
                    - Order Decastavida
                    - Order Petalomonadida
              - Superclass Spirocuta
                - Class Euglenophyceae
                  - Subclass Euglenophycidae
                    - Order Euglenida
                    - Order Eutreptiida
                  - Subclass Rapazia
                    - Order Rapazida
                - Class Peranemea
                  - Subclass Acroglissia
                    - Order Acroglissida
                  - Subclass Anisonemia
                    - Order Anisonemida
                    - Order Natomonadida
                  - Subclass Peranemia
                    - Order Peranemida
            - Infraphylum Entosiphona
              - Class Entosiphonea
                - Order Entosiphonida
          - Subphylum Glycomonada
            - Class Diplonemea
              - Order Diplonemida
            - Class Kinetoplastea
              - Subclass Metakinetoplastina
                - Order Bodonida
                - Order Trypanosomatida
              - Subclass Prokinetoplastina
                - Order Prokinetoplastida
          - Subphylum Postgaardia
            - Class Postgaardea
              - Order Bihospitida
              - Order Postgaardida
        - Phylum Percolozoa
          - Subphylum Orthozoa
            - Class Lunosea
              - Order Selenaionida
            - Class Pharyngomonadea
              - Order Pharyngomonadida
          - Subphylum Tetramitia
            - Infraphylum Eutetramitia
              - Class Heterolobosea
                - Order Acrasida
                - Order Schizopyrenida
              - Class Lyromonadea
                - Order Lyromonadida
                - Order Creneida
              - Class Percolatea
                - Order Percolomonadida
                - Order Pseudociliatida
            - Class Neovahlkampfea
              - Order Neovahlkampfida
      - Phylum Eolouka
        - Class Jakobea
          - Order Jakobida
        - Class Tsukubamonadea
          - Order Tsukubamonadida
    - Infrakingdom Hemimastigophora
      - Phylum Hemimastigophora
        - Class Hemimastigea
  - Subkingdom Sarcomastigota
    - Infrakingdom Diacentrida
      - Phylum Amoebozoa
        - Subphylum Discosa
          - Class Discosea
            - Subclass Centramoebia
              - Order Centramoebida
              - Order Dermamoebida
              - Order Thecamoebida
            - Subclass Flabellinia
              - Order Glycostylida
              - Order Himatismenida
        - Subphylum Tevosa
          - Infraphylum Conosa
            - Superclass Mycetozoa
              - Class Myxogastrea
                - Superorder Columellidia
                  - Order Echinosteliida
                  - Order Fuscisporida
                - Superorder Lucisporidia
                  - Order Liceida
                  - Order Trichiida
              - Class Stelamoebea
                - Subclass Dictyostelia
                  - Order Dictyostelida
                - Subclass Exosporeae
                  - Order Ceratiomyxida
                  - Order Protosporangida
            - Class Archamoebea
              - Order Entamoebida
              - Order Mastigamoebida
              - Order Pelobiontida
              - Order Rhizomastigida
            - Class Cutosea
              - Order Squamocutida
            - Class Variosea
              - Order Artodiscida
              - Order Holomastigida
              - Order Phalansteriida
              - Order Protostelida
              - Order Ramamoebida
              - Order Varipodida
          - Infraphylum Lobosa
            - Class Tubulinea
              - Subclass Echinamoebia
                - Order Echinamoebida
              - Subclass Leptomyxia
                - Order Leptomyxida
              - Subclass Neolobosia
                - Superorder Eulobosia
                  - Order Arcellinida
                  - Order Euamoebida
                - Superorder Trichosia
                  - Order Trichosida
      - Phylum Apusozoa
        - Class Breviatea
          - Order Breviatida
        - Class Thecomonadea
          - Order Apusomonadida
    - Infrakingdom Opizoa
      - Phylum Choanozoa
        - Subphylum Choanofila
          - Class Choanoflagellatea
            - Order Acanthoecida
            - Order Craspedida
          - Class Filasterea
            - Order Ministeriida
          - Class Ichthyosporea
            - Order Corallochytrida
            - Order Dermocystida
            - Order Ichthyophonida
        - Subphylum Paramycia
          - Class Cristidiscoidea
            - Order Fonticulida
            - Order Nucleriida
      - **Phylum Opisthosporidia**
    - Infrakingdom Sulcozoa
      - Phylum Sulcozoa
        - Subphylum Planomonada
          - Class Planomonadea
            - Order Planomonadida
        - Subphylum Varisulca
          - Class Glissodiscea
            - Order Mantamonadida
          - Class Diphyllatea
            - Order Diphylleida
          - Class Hilomonadea
            - Order Rigifilida

== Current classification ==
Legend:

† Extinct, or exclusively fossil taxon.
^{(P)} Paraphyletic or polyphyletic taxon.
^{(P?)} Potentially paraphyletic or polyphyletic taxon.
(=...) Taxonomic synonym.
(...) Same taxon in a different code of nomenclature.

== Amorphea ==
The supergroup Amorphea contains very diverse heterotrophic organisms, from the macroscopic fungi and animals to the unicellular choanoflagellates and classical amoebae. They frequently exhibit the ability to produce multinucleated cells, a trait considered ancestral to Amorphea. They are also capable of producing pseudopodia, as does the closely related CRuMs clade, forming the clade Podiata.

Amorphea is divided into two clades: Amoebozoa, containing well-known amoebae and slime molds, and Obazoa, containing animals, fungi, and their closest relatives. The relationship between these two clades was initially called 'Unikonta', due to a hypothesis where their common ancestor was a unikont, i.e., a eukaryote with just one flagellum. However, this hypothesis was refuted, as there are bikont amorpheans (e.g., Breviata anathema) and it likely is not an ancestral trait to have a single flagellum.

=== Obazoa ===
- Breviatea
- - Apusomonadida
  - - Opisthokonta
      - Nucletmycea
        - Fungi
          - - 'True fungi'
            - Aphelida
          - - Rozellida+Microsporidia
        - Nucleariidae
      - Holozoa
        - Ichthyosporea
        - Pluriformea
        - Filozoa
          - Filasterea
          - Choanozoa
            - Choanoflagellata
            - Metazoa

Cladogram of Obazoa based on several analyses.

The clade Obazoa contains two small groups of flagellates, the breviates and the apusomonads, and the large clade Opisthokonta, which contains animals, fungi, and their closest protist relatives. Under the Cavalier-Smith system, breviates and apusomonads were two classes that composed the phylum Apusozoa, but this taxon is paraphyletic, as apusomonads are more closely related to opisthokonts. The taxonomy of apusomonads was expanded in a 2022 phylogenetic study that introduced many new genera.

- Class Breviatea Cavalier-Smith 2004, order Breviatida Cavalier-Smith 2004. Genus not assigned to any family: Lenisia.
  - Family Breviatidae Cavalier-Smith 2013, genera Breviata, Subulatomonas.
  - Family Pygsuidae Cavalier-Smith 2022, genus Pygsuia.
- Class Thecomonadea Cavalier-Smith 1993 emend. 2013, order Apusomonadida Karpov & Mylnikov 1989, family Apusomonadidae Karpov & Mylnikov 1989. Genera not assigned to any subfamily: Amastigomonas, Multimonas, Podomonas, Catacumbia, Cavaliersmithia, Karpovia, Singekia.
  - Subfamily Apusomonadinae Cavalier-Smith 2010, genera Apusomonas (=Rostromonas), Manchomonas.
  - Subfamily Thecamonadinae Larsen & Patterson 1990, genera Chelonemonas, Thecamonas.

==== Opisthokonta ====
Opisthokonts are divided into two branches: Holozoa (animal-related), containing the ichthyosporeans, pluriformeans, filastereans and choanoflagellates; and Nucletmycea or Holomycota (fungus-related), containing the nucleariids and opisthosporidians. These groups, minus opisthosporidians, were classified as different classes within the paraphyletic phylum Choanozoa in the system of Cavalier-Smith, now obsolete. Instead, Choanozoa is the name used for the clade containing choanoflagellates and animals. Opisthosporidians (aphelids, rozellids and microsporidians) are often studied as protists, but are also considered fungi by protistologists and mycologists alike. Both Holozoa and Nucletmycea have been proposed once as superkingdoms by a group of mycologists who classified nucleariids and fungi as kingdoms, but without any mention of holozoan kingdoms.

- Nucletmycea Brown et al. 2009 (=Holomycota Liu et al. 2009)
  - Order Rotosphaerida Rainer 1968 (=Cristidiscoidida Page 1987), family Nucleariidae Cann & Page 1979 (=Pompholyxophridae Page 1987), genera: Fonticula, Nuclearia, Parvularia, Pompholyxophrys, Lithocolla, Vampyrellidium, Elaeorhanis, Pinaciophora, Rabdiophrys, Rabdiaster, Thomseniophora.
  - Kingdom Fungi R.T. Moore 1980
- Holozoa Lang et al. 2002. Genera incertae sedis: Tunicaraptor, †Bicellum.
  - Class Ichthyosporea Cavalier-Smith 1998 (=Mesomycetozoea Mendoza et al. 2002)
    - Order Dermocystida Cavalier-Smith 1998, family Rhinosporidaceae Mendoza et al. 2001, genera Amphibiocystidium, Amphibiothecum, Chromosphaera, Dermocystidium, Rhinosporidium, Sphaerothecum, Valentines.
    - Order Ichthyophonida Cavalier-Smith 1998 (=Ichthyophonae Mendoza et al. 2001), family Amoebidiidae Reeves 2003, genera Abeoforma, Amoebidium, Anurofeca, Astreptonema, Caullerya, Creolimax, Eccrinidus, Enterobryus, Enteropogon, Ichthyophonus, Palavascia, Pseudoperkinsus, Psorospermium, Sphaeroforma.
  - Pluriformea Hehenberger et al. 2017
    - Family Corallochytriidae Cavalier-Smith in Cavalier-Smith & Allsopp 1996, genus Corallochytrium Raghu-Kumar 1987.
    - Family Syssomonadidae Cavalier-Smith 2022, genus Syssomonas.
  - Class Filasterea Shalchian-Tabrizi et al. 2008, order Ministeriida Cavalier-Smith 1997. Genus not assigned to any family: Pigoraptor.
    - Family Ministeriidae Cavalier-Smith 1997, genus Ministeria.
    - Family Capsasporidae Cavalier-Smith 1997, genus Capsaspora.
    - Family Txikisporidae Urrutia, Feist & Bass 2022, genus Txikispora.
  - Choanozoa Brunet & King 2017
    - Class Choanoflagellata Kent 1880–1882 (=Craspedomonadina Stein 1878, Craspedomonadaceae Senn 1900, Craspedophyceae Chadefaud 1960, Craspédomonadophycidées Bourrelly 1968, Craspedomonadophyceae Hibberd 1976, Choanomonadea Krylov et al. 1980, Choanoflagelliida Lee, Hutner & Bovee 1985, Choanoflagellatea Cavalier-Smith 1997 emend. Cavalier-Smith 1998, Choanomonada Adl et al. 2005)
      - Order Craspedida Cavalier-Smith 1997 emend. Nitsche et al. 2011, family Salpingoecidae Kent 1880–1882 emend. sensu Nitsche et al. 2011 (=Codonosigidae Kent 1880–1882), genera Astrosiga, Aulomonas, Barroeca, Choanoeca, Cladospongia, Codonocladium, Codonosigopsis, Codosiga (=Codonosiga), Desmarella (=Codonodesmus, Kentrosiga), Dicraspedella, Diploeca, Diplosiga, Diplosigopsis, Hartaetosiga, Kentia, Lagenoeca, Microstomoeca, Monosiga, Mylnosiga, Pachysoeca, Proterospongia, Salpingoeca, Salpingorhiza, Sphaeroeca, Stagondoeca, Stelexomonas, Stylochromonas.
      - Order Acanthoecida Cavalier-Smith 1997, emend. Nitsche et al. 2011
        - Family Acanthoecidae Norris 1965, emend. sensu Nitsche et al. 2011, genera Acanthoeca, Enibas, Helgoeca, Polyoeca, Savillea.
        - Family Stephanoecidae Leadbeater 2011, genera Acanthocorbis, Amoenoscopa, Apheloecion, Bicosta, Calliacantha, Calotheca, Campanoeca, Campyloacantha, Conion, Cosmoeca, Crinolina, Crucispina, Diaphanoeca, Didymoeca, Kakoeca, Monocosta, Nannoeca, Parvicorbicula, Thomsenella (="Platypleura"), Pleurasiga, Polyfibula, Saepicula, Saroeca, Spinoeca, Spiraloecion, Stephanacantha, Stephanoeca, Syndetophyllum.
    - Kingdom Metazoa Haeckel 1874 emend. Adl et al. 2005 (=Animalia Linnaeus 1758)

=== Amoebozoa ===
- - - Tubulinea
      - Corycida
      - - Echinamoebida
        - Elardia
          - Leptomyxida
          - Eulobosia
            - Euamoebida
            - Arcellinida
  - - Discosea
      - Centramoebia
      - Flabellinia
    - Evosea
      - Cutosea
      - Conosa
        - Variosea
        - - Archamoebea
          - Eumycetozoa
            - Dictyostelia
            - - Protosporangiida
              - Myxogastria

Cladogram of the major groups of Amoebozoa based on an 824-gene phylogenetic analysis published in 2022.

The phylum Amoebozoa contains around 2,400 species of primarily amoeboid protists. It includes a large portion of the traditional Sarcodina, the taxon uniting all amoebae. In particular, it groups naked and testate lobose amoebae (the traditional Lobosa), as well as the archamoebae and eumycetozoans (slime molds), and a few flagellates. After the general 2019 revisions published by the International Society of Protistologists (ISOP), there have been specific revisions to the classification of eumycetozoans and testate amoebae.

Phylum Amoebozoa Lühe 1913 sensu Cavalier-Smith 1998. Genera incertae sedis: Belonocystis, Boveella, Biomyxa, Corallomyxa, Gibbodiscus, Hartmannia, Malamoeba, Malpighamoeba, Oscillosignum, Pseudothecamoeba, Schoutedamoeba, Stereomyxa, Subulamoeba, Triaenamoeba, Unda.

- Class Tubulinea Smirnov et al. 2005
  - Corycidia Kang et al. 2017
    - Order Trichosida Möbius 1889, family Trichosphaeriidae Sheehan & Banner 1973 (=Trichosidae Möbius 1889), genus Trichosphaerium (=Atrichosa).
    - Family Microcoryciidae de Saedeleer 1934, genera Amphizonella, Diplochlamys, Microcorycia, Parmulina, Penardochlamys, Zonomyxa. (Note: The position of the genera Microcorycia, Parmulina, Penardochlamys and Zonomyxa, which were listed in 2002 under family Microcoryciidae, is not clear. They are placed here by morphological characters but this needs to be supported by molecular data.)
  - Order Echinamoebida Cavalier-Smith et al. 2004 emend. Smirnov et al. 2011
    - Family Echinamoebidae Page 1975, genera Echinamoeba, Micriamoeba.
    - Family Vermamoebidae Cavalier-Smith & Smirnov 2011, genus Vermamoeba.
  - Elardia Kang et al. 2017
    - Order Leptomyxida Pussard & Pons 1976 emend. Page 1987
      - Family Leptomyxidae Pussard & Pons 1976, genus Leptomyxa.
      - Family Rhizamoebidae Smirnov et al. 2016, genus Rhizamoeba.
      - Family Flabellulidae Bovee 1970, genus Flabellula (=Paraflabellula).
      - Family Gephyramoebidae Pussard & Pons 1976, genus Gephyramoeba.
    - Superorder Eulobosia Cavalier-Smith et al. 2016
      - Order Euamoebida Lepşi 1960 sensu Smirnov et al. 2011
        - Family Amoebidae Ehrenberg 1838 Page 1987, genera: Amoeba, Chaos, Polychaos, Parachaos, Trichamoeba, Deuteramoeba, Hydramoeba.
        - Family Hartmannellidae Volkonsky 1931, genera Cashia, Copromyxa, Copromyxella, Glaeseria, Hartmannella, Ptolemeba, Saccamoeba.
        - Family Nolandellidae Cavalier-Smith 2011, Lahr & Katz 2011, genus Nolandella.
      - Order Arcellinida Kent 1880. Genera incertae sedis: Acipyxis, Apolimia, Armipyxis, Conicocassis, Cornuapyxis, Ellipsopyxella, Ellipsopyxis, Erugomicula, Frenopyxis, Geamphorella, Geoplagiopyxis, Geopyxella, Hoogenraadia, Jungia, Lagenodifflugia, Lamptopyxis, Lamtoquadrula, Leptochlamys, Maghrebia, Meisterfeldia, Microquadrula, Nabranella, Oopyxis, Paracentropyxis, Paraquadrula, Pentagonia, Physochila, Planhoogenraadia, Pomoriella, Pontigulasia, Prantlitina, Proplagiopyxis, Protoplagiopyxis, Protocucurbitella, Pseudawerintzewia, Pseudonebela, Schoenbornia, Sexangularia, Suiadifflugia, Trigonopyxis, Wailesella, †Cangwuella.
        - Suborder Phryganellina Bovee 1985
          - Family Phryganellidae Jung 1942, genus Phryganella.
          - Family Cryptodifflugiidae Jung 1942, genus Cryptodifflugia.
        - Suborder Organoconcha Lahr et al. 2019, family Microchlamyiidae Ogden 1985, genera Microchlamys (=Pseudochlamys), Spumochlamys, Pyxidicula.
        - Suborder Glutinoconcha Lahr et al. 2019
          - Infraorder Cylindrothecina González-Miguéns, Todorov, Blandenier, Porfirio-Sousa, Ribeiro, Ramos, Lahr & Lara 2022, family Cylindrifflugiidae González-Miguéns, Todorov, Blandenier, Porfirio-Sousa, Ribeiro, Ramos, Lahr & Lara 2022, genus Cylindrifflugia.
          - Infraorder Excentrostoma Lahr et al. 2019, family Centropyxidae Jung 1942 (incl. Plagiopyxidae Bonnet & Thomas 1960), genera Awerinzewia, Bullinularia, Centropyxis, Frenopyxis, Golemanskia, Plagiopyxis.
          - Infraorder Hyalospheniformes Lahr et al. 2019, family Hyalospheniidae Schulze 1877 emend. Kosakyan & Lara 2012 (=Nebelidae Taranek 1882), genera Alabasta, Alocodera, Apodera, Certesella, Cornutheca, Gibbocarina, Hyalosphenia, Longinebela, Mrabella, Nebela, Padaungiella, Planocarina, Porosia, Quadrulella.
          - Infraorder Longithecina Lahr et al. 2019
            - Family Difflugiidae Wallich 1864, genera Difflugia, Zivkovicia.
            - Family Lesquereusiidae Jung 1942, genus Lesquereusia.
          - Infraorder Pyrumthecina Porfirio-Sousa, Gomes E Souza, Jones, Brown, Lahr & Tice 2025, family Argynniidae Porfirio-Sousa, Gomes E Souza, Jones, Brown, Lahr & Tice 2025, genus Argynnia.
          - Infraorder Sphaerothecina Kosakyan, Lara & Lahr 2016
            - Family Arcellidae Ehrenberg 1843, genera Arcella, Galeripora.
            - Family Netzeliidae Kosakyan et al. 2016, genera Cucurbitella, Cyclopyxis, Netzelia.
          - Infraorder Volnustoma Lahr et al. 2019, family Heleoperidae Jung 1942, genera Heleopera, Metaheleopera.
- Class Discosea Cavalier-Smith et al. 2004 sensu Smirnov et al. 2011
  - Subclass Flabellinia Smirnov et al. 2005
    - Superorder Dermelia Jones et al. 2025
      - Order Mycamoebida Jones & Brown in Jones et al. 2025, family Mycamoebidae Jones & Brown in Jones et al. 2025, genera Mycamoeba, Janelia, Microglomus.
      - Order Dermamoebida Cavalier-Smith 2004 emend. Kudryavtsev, Voytinsky & Volkova 2022
        - Family Dermamoebidae Cavalier-Smith & Smirnov 2011, genera Dermamoeba, Paradermamoeba, Coronamoeba.
        - Family Mayorellidae Schaeffer 1926, genus Mayorella.
    - Superorder Thecavania Jones et al. 2025
      - Order Stygamoebida Smirnov & Cavalier-Smith in Smirnov et al. 2011
        - Family Stygamoebidae Smirnov & Cavalier-Smith in Smirnov et al. 2011, genus Stygamoeba.
        - Family Vermistellidae Cavalier-Smith in Cavalier-Smith et al. 2016, genus Vermistella.
      - Order Thecamoebida (Note: The orders Thecamoebida, Dactylopodida, Acanthopodida, Himatismenida and Pellitida were initially divided into families, but phylogenetic analyses haven't supported the monophyly of each family. For this reason, in recent classifications there is no family rank division within it.) Schaeffer 1926 sensu Smirnov & Cavalier-Smith 2011, genera Sappinia, Stenamoeba, Stratorugosa, Thecamoeba, Thecochaos.
      - Order Dactylopodida Smirnov et al. 2005 sensu Kang et al. 2017, genera Cunea, Janickina, Korotnevella, Neoparamoeba, Paramoeba, Pseudoparamoeba, Vexillifera.
      - Order Vannellida Smirnov et al. 2005, family Vannellidae Bovee 1979, genera Clydonella, Lingulamoeba, Paravannella, Pessonella, (Note: The genus Pessonella could be a synonym of Vannella.) Ripella, Vannella.
  - Subclass Centramoebia Cavalier-Smith et al. 2016
    - Order Himatismenida Page 1987, genera Cochliopodium, Ovalopodium, Parvamoeba.
    - Superorder Acapostellia Gàlvez-Morante, Berney & Richter 2026
      - Order Acanthopodida Page 1976 (=Centramoebida Rogerson & Patterson 2002 sensu Tice et al. 2016), genera Acanthamoeba, Balamuthia, Luapeleamoeba, Protacanthamoeba, Dracoamoeba, Vacuolamoeba.
      - Order Apostamoebida Gàlvez-Morante, Berney & Richter 2026, family Apostamoebidae Gàlvez-Morante, Berney & Richter 2026, genus Apostamoeba
      - Order Pellitida Smirnov & Cavalier-Smith 2011 sensu Kang et al. 2017, genera Endostelium, Gocevia, Paragocevia, Pellita.
- Evosea Kang et al. 2017
  - Class Cutosea Cavalier-Smith in Cavalier-Smith, Chao & Lewis 2016, order Squamocutida Cavalier-Smith in Cavalier-Smith, Chao & Lewis 2016
    - Family Squamamoebidae Cavalier-Smith in Cavalier-Smith, Chao & Lewis 2016, genera Armaparvus, Squamamoeba.
    - Family Sapocribridae Cavalier-Smith in Cavalier-Smith, Chao & Lewis 2016, genus Sapocribrum.
    - Family Idionectidae Hess & Simpson 2019, genus Idionectes.
  - Class Variosea Cavalier-Smith 2004. Genera not assigned to any lower clade: Angulamoeba, Arboramoeba, Darbyshirella, Dictyamoeba, Ischnamoeba, Heliamoeba, Filamoeba, Phalansterium. (Note: The 2019 revision by the ISOP ignores the grouping of some variosean genera into higher rank clades (orders and families) proposed in older studies, due to the weakly supported SSU rRNA phylogenetic analyses.)
    - Family Flamellidae Lahr & Katz in Lahr et al. 2011, genera Flamella (=Comandonia), Telaepolella Lahr et al. 2012.
    - Order Protosteliida (Protosteliales) L.S.Olive & Stoian. 1966 sensu Shadwick & Spiegel in Adl et al. 2012, family Protosteliidae (Protosteliaceae) L.S.Olive & Stoian. 1966, genus Protostelium (incl. Planoprotostelium).
    - Order Fractovitellida Lahr et al. 2011 sensu Kang et al. 2017
      - Family Acramoebidae Smirnov, Nassonova & Cavalier-Smith 2008, genus Acramoeba.
      - Family Schizoplasmodiidae Shadwick & Spiegel in Adl et al. 2012, genera Ceratiomyxella, Nematostelium, Schizoplasmodium.
      - Family Soliformoviidae Lahr & Katz 2011. Genera: Soliformovum Spiegel 1995; Grellamoeba Dyková, Kostka & Pecková 2008.
    - Order Cavosteliida (Cavosteliales) Shadwick & Spiegel in Adl et al. 2012, family Cavosteliidae (Cavosteliaceae) Olive & Stoianovitch 1964, genera Cavostelium, Schizoplasmodiopsis, Tychosporium.
    - Order Holomastigida Lauterborn 1895, family Multiciliidae Poche 1913, genus Multicilia.
    - Order Artodiscida Cavalier-Smith 2013, family Artodiscidae Cavalier-Smith 2013, genera Artodiscus, Tetracilia.
  - Class Archamoebea Cavalier-Smith 1983 sensu Pánek et al. 2016
    - Family Tricholimacidae Cavalier-Smith 2012, genus Tricholimax.
    - Order Entamoebida Cavalier-Smith 1993, family Entamoebidae Chatton 1925, genera Entamoeba, †Entamoebites.
    - Order Pelobiontida Page 1976 sensu Pánek et al. 2016
      - Suborder Pelomyxina Starobogatov 1980 stat. nov. Pánek et al. 2016, family Pelomyxidae Schulze 1877, genera Mastigella (=Mastigamoeba), Pelomyxa.
      - Suborder Mastigamoebina Frenzel 1897 stat. nov. Pánek et al. 2016
        - Family Rhizomastixidae Ptáčková et al. 2013, genus Rhizomastix.
        - Family Mastigamoebidae Goldschmidt 1907, genera Endamoeba, Endolimax, Iodamoeba, Mastigamoeba, Mastigina.
  - Eumycetozoa Zopf 1884 sensu Kang et al. 2017 (=Mycetozoa de Bary 1859 ex Rostafinski 1873, Macromycetozoa Fiore-Donno 2010)
    - Class Dictyostelea Lister 1909 sensu Sheikh et al. 2018 (Dictyosteliomycetes Doweld 2001). Genus unassigned to any order: Synstelium. Genus incertae sedis: Coenonia.
      - Order Acytosteliales S.Baldauf S.Sheikh & Thulin 2018
        - Family Acytosteliaceae Raper ex Raper & Quinlan 1958, genera Acytostelium, Rostrostelium, Heterostelium.
        - Family Cavenderiaceae S.Baldauf, S.Sheikh & Thulin 2018, genus Cavenderia.
      - Order Dictyosteliales L.S.Olive ex P.M.Kirk et al. 2001. Genus unassigned to any family: Coremiostelium.
        - Family Dictyosteliaceae Rostaf. ex Cooke 1877, genera Dictyostelium, Polysphondylium.
        - Family Raperosteliaceae S.Baldauf S.Sheikh & Thulin 2018, genera Hagiwaraea, Raperostelium, Speleostelium, Tieghemostelium.
    - Class Ceratiomyxomycetes (Ceratiomyxea) D. Hawksw., B. Sutton & Ainsw. 2019, order Protosporangiida Shadwick & Spiegel in Adl et al. 2012 (Ceratiomyxales G.W. Martin ex M.L. Farr & Alexop.)
      - Family Ceratiomyxaceae (Ceratiomyxidae) J.Schröt. 1889, genus Ceratiomyxa.
      - Family Protosporangiidae Spiegel in Adl et al. 2012 (Protosporangiaceae Leontyev, Stephenson, Schnittler, Shchepin & Novozhilov 2020), genera Clastostelium, Protosporangium.
    - Class Myxogastrea Cavalier-Smith 1993 (Myxomycetes G.Winter 1880) (=Myxogastres Fr. 1829, Myxogasteres Schröt., 1889, Endosporeae Rostaf. 1873, Myxogastromycetidae G.W.Martin 1961, Myxogastromycetes M.Locquin 1974, Myxogastria Cavalier-Smith 2012 as "Myxogastria L.S.Olive 1970" nom. inval.)
      - Subclass Lucisporinia Cavalier-Smith 2013 as "Lucisporidia" (Lucisporomycetidae Leontyev, Schnittler, S.L.Stephenson, Novozhilov & Shchepin 2019). Genera incertae sedis: Arcyriatella, Calonema, Minakatella, Trichioides.
        - Superorder Cribariidia Leontyev, Schnittler, S.L.Stephenson, Novozhilov & Shchepin 2019, order Cribariales (Cribariida) T.Macbr. 1922, family Cribariaceae (Cribariidae) Corda 1838, genera Cribaria, Lindbladia, Licaethalium.
        - Superorder Trichiidia Leontyev, Schnittler, S.L.Stephenson, Novozhilov & Shchepin 2019
          - Order Reticulariales (Reticulariida) Leontyev, Schnittler, S.L.Stephenson, Novozhilov & Shchepin 2019, family Reticulariaceae (Reticulariidae) Chevall. ex Corda 1842, genera: Alwisia, Lycogala , Reticularia, Tubifera.
          - Order Liceales (Liceida), family Liceaceae (Liceidae) Chevall. 1826, genera Licea, Listerella.
          - Order Trichiales (Trichiida) T.Macbr. 1922
            - Family Dianemataceae (Dianematidae) T.Macbr. 1922, genera Calomyxa, Dianema, Dictydiaethalium, Prototrichia.
            - Family Trichiaceae (Trichiidae) Chevall. 1826 sensu Martin & Alexopoulos 1969, genera Hemitrichia (incl. Trichia decipiens), Arcyria (incl. Arcyodes); Perichaena^{(P)}, Trichia (incl. Cornuvia, Metatrichia, Oligonema).
      - Subclass Columellinia Cavalier-Smith 2013 as "Columellidia" (Columellomycetidae Leontyev, Schnittler, S.L.Stephenson, Novozhilov & Shchepin 2019) (=Fuscisporidia Cavalier-Smith 2013 sensu Kretzschmar et al. 2015). Genera incertae sedis: Diachea, Echinosteliopsis, Leptoderma, Paradiachea, Protophysarum, Trabrooksia, Willkommlangea.
        - Superorder Echinosteliidia Leontyev, Schnittler, S.L.Stephenson, Novozhilov & Shchepin 2019, order Echinosteliales (Echinosteliida) G. W. Martin 1961, family Echinosteliaceae (Echinosteliidae) Rostaf. ex Cooke 1877, genera: Barbeyella, Echinostelium (incl. Semimorula).
        - Superorder Stemonitidia Leontyev, Schnittler, S.L.Stephenson, Novozhilov & Shchepin 2019
          - Order Clastodermatales (Clastodermatida) Leontyev, Schnittler, S.L.Stephenson, Novozhilov & Shchepin 2019, family Clastodermataceae (Clastodermatidae) Alexop. & T.E. Brooks 1971, genus Clastoderma.
          - Order Meridermatales (Meridermatida) Leontyev, Schnittler, S.L.Stephenson, Novozhilov & Shchepin 2019, family Meridermataceae (Meridermatidae) Leontyev, Schnittler, S.L.Stephenson, Novozhilov & Shchepin 2019, genus Meriderma.
          - Order Stemonitales (Stemonitida) T.Macbr. 1922 emend. Leontyev, Schnittler, S.L.Stephenson, Novozhilov & Shchepin 2019
            - Family Stemonitidaceae (Stemonitidae) Fr. 1829 emend. Leontyev, Schnittler, S.L.Stephenson, Novozhilov & Shchepin 2019, genera Macbrideola, Stemonitis, Symphytocarpus.
            - Family Amaurochaetaceae (Amaurochaetidae) Rostaf. ex Cooke 1877 emend. Leontyev, Schnittler, S.L.Stephenson, Novozhilov & Shchepin 2019, genera Comatricha, Stemonaria, Stemonitopsis, Amaurochaete, Brefeldia, Enerthenema, Paradiacheopsis.
          - Order Physarales (Physarida) T.Macbr. 1922. Genus not assigned to any family: Tasmaniomyxa.
            - Family Lamprodermataceae (Lamprodermatidae) T.Macbr. 1899 emend. Leontyev, Schnittler, S.L.Stephenson, Novozhilov & Shchepin 2019, genera Lamproderma (incl. Dichaeopsis, Colloderma, Elaeomyxa), Collaria^{(P)}.
            - Family Didymiaceae (Didymiidae) Rostaf. ex Cooke 1877, genera Diderma, Didymium, Lepidoderma, Mucilago.
            - Family Physaraceae (Physaridae) Chevall. 1826, genera Craterium, Leocarpus, Fuligo, Physarum (incl. Badhamia), Physarella, Physarina, Kelleromyxa.

== Archaeplastida ==
The clade Archaeplastida encompasses photosynthetic eukaryotes whose chloroplasts are derived from an event of primary endosymbiosis with a cyanobacterium. This includes the multicellular land plants (embryophytes), distinguished by their embryonic development and differentiation into tissues, and a multitude of protist lineages, many of which have also evolved multicellularity independently (e.g., red algae). Together, they amount to an estimated 500,000 species, with protists covering less than 50,000. In some systems of classification, Archaeplastida is equivalent to the plant kingdom (Plantae). As such, the protist lineages, including simple, single-celled algae and protozoa, are regarded as "plants" under this definition. Other definitions exclude these protists, and reduce the plant kingdom to only embryophytes.

=== Rhodophyta ===
- - - Cyanidiophytina
      Cyanidiophyceae
  - - Proteorhodophytina
      - - Porphyridiophyceae
        - Compsopogonophyceae
      - - Rhodellophyceae
        - Stylonematophyceae
    - Eurhodophytina
      - Bangiophyceae
      - Florideophyceae

Cladogram showing the relationships between red algal classes, according to a 2017 phylogenomic analysis.

The red algae, formally known as phylum Rhodophyta, are a group of more than 7,100 species of photosynthetic eukaryotes containing primary plastids. They have evolved into diverse morphologies, from single coccoid cells to large pseudoparenchymatous thalli that have complex life cycles with up to three generations. Unlike other eukaryotes, they lack flagella and centrioles in all their life stages.

Traditionally, red algae have been classified according to morphology as two classes (Bangiophyceae and Florideophyceae), or two subclasses (Bangiophycidae and Florideophycidae) of a single class Rhodophyceae. This system was challenged with the rise of molecular phylogenetics, which revealed the paraphyly of Bangiophyceae. In addition, a third class, Cyanidiophyceae, was discovered as the earliest diverging lineage. In 2004 a new molecular-based classification of red algae was proposed, where they composed a subkingdom of plants (Rhodoplantae) divided into two phyla: Cyanidiophyta, with just one class, and Rhodophyta, with three subphyla (Rhodellophytina, Metarhodophytina and Eurhodophytina) and four classes, one of which was still paraphyletic. In 2006, a comprehensive molecular analysis revised the classification and proposed a single phylum Rhodophyta with two subphyla: Cyanidiophytina, with one class, and Rhodophytina, with six classes. This taxonomic system, developed by Hwan Su Yoon and collaborators, is the prevalent among taxonomists, with the addition of a separation of subphylum Rhodophytina into two subphyla Proteorhodophytina and Eurhodophytina in 2017. In 2022, a book was published revising the classification of all freshwater red algae.

Phylum Rhodophyta Wettstein 1901

- Subphylum Cyanidiophytina H.S.Yoon, K.M.Müller, R.G.Sheath, F.D.Ott & D.Bahattacharya 2006, class Cyanidiophyceae Merola, Castaldo, De Luca, Gambardella, Musacchio & Taddei 1981, order Cyanidiales Christensen 1962
  - Family Cyanidiaceae Geitler 1935, genera Cyanidium, Cyanidioschyzon.
  - Family Galdieriaceae Merola, Castaldo, De Luca, Gambardella, Musacchio & Taddei 1981, genus Galdieria.
- Subphylum Proteorhodophytina S.A.Muñoz-Gómez, F.G.Mejía-Franco, K.Durnin, M.Colp, C.J.Grisdale, J.M.Archibald & C.H.Slamovits 2017
  - Class Compsopogonophyceae G.W.Saunders & Hommersand 2004
    - Order Compsopogonales Skuja 1939
      - Family Boldiaceae Herndon 1964, genus Boldia.
      - Family Compsopogonaceae Schmitz in Engler & Prantl 1896, genus Compsopogon.
    - Order Erythropeltidales Garbary, Hansen & Scagel 1980, family Erythrotrichiaceae G.M.Smith 1933, genera Erythrotrichia, Chlidophyllon, Erythrocladia, Pyrophyllon, Sahlingia.
    - Order Rhodochaetales Bessey 1907, family Rhodochaetaceae Schmitz in Engler & Prantl 1896, genus Rhodochaete.
  - Class Porphyridiophyceae H.S.Yoon, K.M.Müller, R.G.Sheath, F.D.Ott & D.Bahattacharya 2006, order Porphyridiales Kylin ex Skuja 1939, family Porphyridiaceae Skuja 1939, genera Porphyridium, Erythrolobus, Flintiella.
  - Class Rhodellophyceae Cavalier-Smith 1998, order Rhodellales H.S.Yoon, K.M.Müller, R.G.Sheath, F.D.Ott & D.Bahattacharya 2006, family Rhodellaceae H.S.Yoon, K.M.Müller, R.G.Sheath, F.D.Ott & D.Bahattacharya 2006, genera Rhodella, Dixoniella, Glaucosphaera.
  - Class Stylonematophyceae H.S.Yoon, K.M.Müller, R.G.Sheath, F.D.Ott & D.Bahattacharya 2006, order Stylonematales Drew 1956, family Stylonemataceae Drew 1956, genera Stylonema, Bangiopsis, Chroodactylon, Chroothece, Purpureofilum, Rhodosorus, Rhodospora, Rufusia.
- Subphylum Eurhodophytina G.W.Saunders & Hommersand 2004
  - Class Bangiophyceae Wettstein 1901, order Bangiales Nägeli 1847, family Bangiaceae Engler 1892, genera Bangia, Dione, Minerva, Porphyra, Pseudobangia.
  - Class Florideophyceae Cronquist 1960
    - Subclass Hildenbrandiophycidae G.W.Saunders & Hommersand 2004, order Hildenbrandiales Pueschel & K.M.Cole 1982, family Hildenbrandiaceae Rabenhorst 1868, genera Apophlaea, Hildenbrandia, Riverina.
    - Subclass Nemaliophycidae T.Christensen 1978
      - Order Acrochaetiales Feldmann emend. J.T.Harper & G.W.Saunders 2002, family Acrochaetiaceae Fritsch emend. J.T.Harper & G.W.Saunders 2002, genera Acrochaetium, Audouniella, Rhodochorton.
      - Order Balbianiales Sheath & K.M.Müller 1999, family Balbianiaceae Sheath & K.M.Müller 1999, genera Balbiania, Rhododraparnaldia.
      - Order Balliales H.-G.Choi, Kraft & G.W.Saunders 2000, family Balliaceae H.-G.Choi, Kraft & G.W.Saunders 2000, genus Ballia.
      - Order Batrachospermales Pueschel & K.M.Cole 1982, family Batrachospermaceae C.Agardh 1824 emend. Entwisle, M.L.Vis, W.B.Chiasson, Necchi & A.R.Sherwood 2009, genera Acarposporophycos, Balliopsis, Batrachospermum, Genadendalia, Kumanoa, Lympha, Macrosporophycos, Montagnia, Nocturama, Notohesperus, Petrohua, Psilosiphon, Sheathia, Sirodotia, Torularia, Tuomeya, Virescentia, Visia, Volatus.
      - Order Colaconematales J.T.Harper & G.W.Saunders 2002, family Colaconemataceae J.T.Harper & G.W.Saunders 2002, genus Colaconema.
      - Order Corynodactylales G.W.Saunders, Wadland, Salomaki & C.E. Lane 2017, family Corynodactylaceae G.W.Saunders, Wadland, Salomaki & C.E.Lane 2017, genus Corynodactylum.
      - Order Entwisleiales G.W.Saunders & Kraft 2013, family Entwisleiaceae G.W.Saunders & Kraft 2013, genus Entwisleia.
      - Order Nemaliales Schmitz in Engler 1892
        - Suborder Galaxaurineae J.F.Costa, S.M.Lin, E.C.Macaya, C.Fernández-García, H.Verbruggen 2016
          - Family Galaxauraceae, genera Galaxaura, Actinotrichia, Dichotomaria.
          - Family Scinaiaceae, genera Sciania, Tricleocarpa, Nothogenia, Gloiophloea, Whidbeyella.
        - Suborder Nemaliineae J.F.Costa, S.M.Lin, E.C.Macaya, C.Fernández-García, H.Verbruggen 2016
          - Family Nemaliaceae, genus Nemalion.
          - Family Liagoraceae, genera Akalaphycus, Cumagloia, Cylindraxis, Dermonema, Dotyophycus, Ganonema, Gloiocalis, Gloiotrichus, Helminthocladia, Helminthora, Hommersandiophycus, Izziella, Liagora, Macrocarpus, Neoizziella, Patenocarpus, Sinocladia, Stenopeltis, Titanophycus, Trichogloea, Trichogloeopsis, Yoshizakia.
          - Family Liagoropsidaceae S.-M.Lin, Rodríguez-Prieto & Huisman 2015, genus Liagoropsis.
          - Family Yamadaellaceae S.-M.Lin, Rodríguez-Prieto & J.M.Huisman 2015, genus Yamadaella.
      - Order Inkyuleeales Díaz-Tapia & Maggs 2019, family Inkyuleeaceae H.-G.Choi, Kraft & G.W.Saunders 2008, genus Inkyuleea.
      - Order Ottiales K.P.Fang, F.R.Nan, & S.L.Xie 2022, family Ottiaceae Entwisle, J.R. Evans, M.L. Vis et G.W. Saunders 2018, genus Ottia.
      - Order Palmariales Guiry & D.E.G.Irvine 1978
        - Family Mediodiscaceae S.L.Clayden & G.W.Saunders 2010, genera Mediodiscus, Kallymenicola, Rhodophysemopsis, Rubrointrusa, Torngatum.
        - Family Palmariaceae Guiry 1974, genera Palmaria (=Ceramium, Leptosarca), Devaleraea, Halosaccion, Neohalosacciocolax* (Note: According to a 2018 molecular study: "The genera Coriophyllum, Neohalosacciocolax and Pseudorhododiscus are currently assigned to the Palmariales but have yet to be included in a molecular phylogenetic context, and their associations within the Palmariales remain equivocal.").
        - Family Rhodophysemataceae G.W.Saunders & J.L.McLachlan 1989, genera Rhodophysema (=Halosacciocolax, Rhododerma), Rhodonematella, Coriophyllum* (=Asymmetria), Pseudorhododiscus*.
        - Family Rhodothamniellaceae G.W. Saunders 1995, genera Rhodothamniella, Camontagnea.
      - Order Rhodachlyales G.W.Saunders, S.L.Clayden, J.L.Scott, K.A.West, U.Karsten & J.A.West 2008, family Rhodachlyaceae G.W.Saunders, S.L.Clayden, J.L.Scott, K.A.West, U.Karsten & J.A.West 2008, genus Rhodachlya.
      - Order Thoreales K.M.Müller, Sheath, A.R.Sherwood & Pueschel 2002, family Thoreaceae Hassall 1845, genera Thorea, Nemalionopsis.
    - Subclass Corallinophycidae Le Gall & G.W.Saunders 2007
      - Order Corallinales Silva & H.W.Johansen 1986
        - Family Corallinaceae Lamouroux 1812. Genus incertae sedis: †Aguirrea.
          - Subfamily Chamberlainoideae Caragnano, Foetisch, Maneveldt & Payri 2018, genera Chamberlainium, Pneophyllum.
          - Subfamily Corallinoideae (Areschoug) Foslie 1908
            - Tribe Corallineae, genera Alatocladia, Bossiella, Calliarthron, Chiharaea, Corallina, Ellisolandia, Johansenia, Pseudolithophyllum.
          - Subfamily Mastophoroideae (Setchell) A.Kato & M.Baba in Kato et al. 2011, genera Mastophora, Metamastophora.
          - Subfamily Neogoniolithoideae (A.Kato & M.Baba) emend. A.Rösler, Perfectti, V.Peña & J.C.Braga 2016, genera Neogoniolithon, Spongites.
          - Subfamily Lithophylloideae Setchel 1943 emend. J.C.Bailey 1999 (incl. Amphiroideae Johansen 1969), genera Amphiroa, Ezo, Lithophyllum, Lithothrix, Tenarea, Titanoderma.
        - Family Porolithaceae R.A.Townsend & Huisman 2018
          - Subfamily Floiophycoideae R.A.Townsend & Huisman 2018, genera Dawsoniolithon, Floiophycus, Oztralia.
          - Subfamily Metagoniolithoideae H.W.Johansen 1969, genera Harveylithon, Metagoniolithon.
          - Subfamily Porolithoideae A.Kato & M.Baba in A.Kato, M.Baba & S.Sida 2011, genera Porolithon, Leptoporolithon.
        - Family Spongitaceae Kützing 1843, genus Spongites.
        - Family Spongitidaceae Kützing 1843
      - Order Corallinapetrales S.Y.Jeong, W.A.Nelson, B.Y.Won & T.O.Cho 2021, family Corallinapetraceae S.Y.Jeong, W.A.Nelson, B.Y.Won & T.O.Cho 2021, genus Corallinapetra.
      - Order Hapalidiales
        - Family Hapalidiaceae
          - Subfamily Austrolithoideae, genera Austrolithon, Boreolithon.
          - Subfamily Choreonematoideae, genus Choreonema.
          - Subfamily Melobesioideae, genera Clathromorphum, Exilicrusta, Kvaleya, Lithothamnion, Mastophoropsis, Melobesia, Mesophyllum, Phymatolithon, Synarthrophyton.
      - Order Rhodogorgonales
      - Order Sporolithales
        - Family Sporolithaceae, genera Heydrichia, Sporolithon.
    - Subclass Ahnfeltiophycidae
      - Order Ahnfeltiales
      - Order Pihiellales
    - Subclass Rhodymeniophycidae
      - Order Acrosymphytales
      - Order Bonnemaisoniales
      - Order Ceramiales
      - Order Gelidiales
      - Order Gigartinales
      - Order Gracilariales
      - Order Halymeniales
      - Order Nemastomatales
      - Order Peyssonneliales
      - Order Plocamiales
      - Order Rhodymeniales
      - Order Sebdeniales

=== Rhodelphidia ===
Phylum Rhodelphidia Tikhonenkov, Gawryluk, Mylnikov & Keeling 2019 → class Rhodelphidea Tikhonenkov, Gawryluk, Mylnikov & Keeling 2019 → order Rhodelphida Tikhonenkov, Gawryluk, Mylnikov & Keeling 2019 → family Rhodelphidae Tikhonenkov, Gawryluk, Mylnikov & Keeling 2019. Sole genus: Rhodelphis Tikhonenkov, Gawryluk, Mylnikov & Keeling 2019.

=== Picozoa ===
Phylum Picozoa Seenivasan, Sausen, Medlin & Melkonian 2013 (=picobiliphytes Not et al. 2007) → class Picomonadea Seenivasan, Sausen, Medlin & Melkonian 2013 → order Picomonadida Seenivasan, Sausen, Medlin & Melkonian 2013 → family Picomonadidae Seenivasan, Sausen, Medlin & Melkonian 2013. Sole genus: Picomonas Seenivasan, Sausen, Medlin & Melkonian 2013. (Note: The picobiliphytes are phylogenetically closer to Rhodophyta and Rhodelphis than to other groups, and are therefore considered part of Archaeplastida.)

=== Glaucophyta ===
Phylum Glaucophyta Skuja 1954 (=Glaucocystaceae West 1904, Glaucocystophyta Kies and Kremer 1986, Glaucoplantae Marin & Melkonian in Li et al. 2020). Incertae sedis genera: Archaeopsis, Chalarodora, Glaucocystopsis, Peliaina, Strobilomonas.

- Order Cyanophorales Kies & Kremer 2006. Sole genus: Cyanophora.
- Order Glaucocystales Bessey 1907. Sole genus: Glaucocystis.
- Order Gloeochaetales Bessey 1907. Genera: Cyanoptyche, Gloeochaete.

=== Chloroplastida ===
- - Chlorophyta
    - - - - core Chlorophyta
            - - - - - Chlorophyceae
                    - Bryopsidales
                  - Ulvophyceae s.s.
                - Trebouxiophyceae
              - Chlorodendrophyceae*
            - Pedinophyceae
          - Chloropicophyceae*
        - Picocystophyceae*
      - Nephroselmidophyceae*
    - - Mamiellophyceae*
      - Pyramimonadophyceae*
  - Prasinodermophyta
    - Palmophyllophyceae*
    - Prasinodermophyceae*
  - Streptophyta
    - - Mesostigmatophyceae
      - Chlorokybophyceae
    - - Klebsormidiophyceae
      - - Charophyceae
        - - Coleochaetophyceae
          - - Zygnematophyceae
            - Embryophyta (land plants)

Cladogram of Chloroplastida with focus on the classes of green algae, based on 2019–2023 phylogenetic studies. Prasinophytes are marked *.

The green algae are a paraphyletic group from which land plants (Embryophyta) evolved. Together they form the clade Chloroplastida (in reference to their green plastids), also known as Viridiplantae (meaning "green plants"). Green algae were originally studied as a single division Chlorophyta.

==== Prasinodermophyta ====
Division Prasinodermatophyta Marin & Melkonian in Li et al. 2020 (as Prasinodermophyta)

- Class Prasinodermatophyceae Marin & Melkonian in Li et al. 2020 (as Prasinodermophyceae), order Prasinodermatales Marin & Melkonian in Li et al. 2020, family Prasinodermataceae Marin & Melkonian in Li et al. 2020, genus Prasinoderma.
- Class Palmophyllophyceae Leliaert et al. 2016 emend. Marin & Melkonian in Li et al. 2020
  - Order Palmophyllales Zechman, Verbruggen, Leliaert, Ashwort, M.A.Buchheim, Fawley, H.Spalding, Pueschel, J.A.Buschheim, Verghese & Hanisak 2010, family Palmophyllaceae Zechman, Verbruggen, Leliaert, Ashwort, M.A.Buchheim, Fawley, H.Spalding, Pueschel, J.A.Buschheim, Verghese & Hanisak 2010, genera Palmophyllum, Verdigellas, Palmoclathrus^{?}.
  - Order Prasinococcales Guillou et al. ex Leliaert et al. 2016 emend. Marin & Melkonian in Li et al. 2020, family Prasinococcaceae Leliaert et al. 2016, genus Prasinococcus.

==== Chlorophyta ====
Division Chlorophyta Reichenbach 1828 emend. Pascher 1914 emend. Lewis & McCourt 2004

- Class Chloropicophyceae Lopes dos Santos & Eikrem 2017, order Chloropicales Lopes dos Santos & Eikrem 2017, family Chloropicaceae Lopes dos Santos & Eikrem 2017, genera Chloroparvula, Chloropicon.
- Class Mamiellophyceae Marin & Melkonian 2010
  - Order Mamiellales Moestrup 1984 emend. Marin & Melkonian 2010
    - Family Bathycoccaceae Marin & Melkonian 2010, genera Bathycoccus, Ostreococcus.
    - Family Mamiellaceae Moestrup 1984 emend. Marin & Melkonian 2010, genera Mamiella, Mantoniella, Micromonas.
  - Order Dolichomastigales Marin & Melkonian 2010
    - Family Crustomastigaceae Marin & Melkonian 2010, genus Crustomastix.
    - Family Dolichomastigaceae Marin & Melkonian 2010, genus Dolichomastix.
  - Order Monomastigales R.E.Norris ex Marin & Melkonian 2010 (=Monomastigales Norris in Parker 1982 nomen nudum), family Monomastigaceae Marin & Melkonian 2010, genus Monomastix.
- Class Nephroselmidophyceae Cavalier-Smith 1993 emend. Yamaguchi 2011, order Nephroselmidales Nakayama, Suda, Kawachi & Inouye 2007, family Nephroselmidaceae Pascher 1913 ex Silva 1980, genus Nephroselmis.
- Class Picocystophyceae Lopes dos Santos & Eikrem 2017, order Picocystales Lopes dos Santos & Eikrem 2017, family Picocystaceae Lopes dos Santos & Eikrem 2017, genus: Picocystis.
- Class Pseudoscourfieldiophyceae Crépeault, C.Otis, Pombert, Turmel & Lemieu 2024, order Pseudoscourfieldiales Melkonian 1990 ex Crépeault, C.Otis, Pombert, Turmel & Lemieu 2024, family Pseudoscourfieldiaceae Melkonian 1990 ex Crépeault, C.Otis, Pombert, Turmel & Lemieu 2024 (=Pycnococcaceae Guillard in Guillard, Keller, O'Kelly & Floyd 1991 emend. M.W.Fawley in Fawley et al. 1999, genus Pseudoscourfieldia (=Pycnococcus).
- Class Pyramimonadophyceae Moestrup & Daugbjerg in Daugbjerg et al. 2020, order Pyramimonadales Chadefaud 1950
  - Family Pyramimonadaceae Korshikov 1938, genera Cymbomonas, Pyramimonas, "Prasinopapilla" (not formally described).
  - Family Halosphaeraceae Haeckel 1894, genera Halosphaera, Pachysphaera, †Tasmanites^{?}.
- Core Chlorophyta
  - Class Chlorodendrophyceae Massjuk 2006, order Chlorodendrales Berger 1954 as "Chlorodendrinales" (=Tetraselmidales Ettl. 1982), family Chlorodendraceae Oltmanns 1904, genera Prasinocladus, Scherffelia, Tetraselmis.
  - Class Pedinophyceae Moestrup 1991 emend. Fawley, Zechman & Buchheim in Adl et al. 2012
    - Order Marsupiomonadales Marin 2012
      - Family Marsupiomonadaceae Marin 2012, genus Marsupiomonas.
      - Family Resultomonadaceae Marin 2012, genus Resultomonas.
    - Order Pedinomonadales Moestrup 1991 emend. Marin 2012, family Pedinomonadaceae Korshikov 1938, genera Chlorochytridion, Pedinomonas.
  - UTC clade
    - Class Chlorophyceae Wille 1884
      - SV clade. Genera incertae sedis: Spermatozopsis, Golenkinia, Jenufa, Johansenicoccus.
        - Order Sphaeropleales^{(P?)} Luerssen 1877
          - Family Dictyochloridaceae Fučíková, P.O.Lewis & L.A.Lewis 2013, genus Dictyochloris.
          - Family Sphaeropleaceae Kützing 1849, genera Ankyra, Atractomorpha, Sphaeroplea.
          - Family Microsporaceae Bohlin 1901
          - Clade Treubarinia Nakada, Misawa & Nozaki 2008, genera Trochiscia, Treubaria, Cylindrocapsa, Elakatothrix.
          - Clade Scenedesminia Nakada, Misawa & Nozaki 2008
            - Family Bracteacoccaceae P.M.Tsarenko 2005, genus Bracteacoccus.
            - Family Bracteamorphaceae Fučíková, P.O.Lewis & L.A.Lewis 2013, genus Bracteamorpha.
            - Family Chromochloridaceae Fučíková, P.O.Lewis & L.A.Lewis 2013, genus Chromochloris.
            - ^{?}Family Dictyococcaceae Fučíková, P.O.Lewis & L.A.Lewis 2013, genus Dictyococcus.
            - Family Hydrodictyaceae Dumortier 1829, genera Hydrodictyon, Lacunastrum, Monactinus, Parapediastrum^{(P)}, Pediastrum, Sorastrum, Stauridium, Tetraedron.
            - Family Mychonastaceae Fučíková, P.O.Lewis & L.A.Lewis 2013, genus Mychonastes.
            - Family Neochloridaceae Ettl & Komárek 1982, genera Botryosphaerella, Characiopodium, Chlorotetraedron, Neochloris, Polyedriopsis.
            - Family Pseudomuriellaceae Fučíková, P.O.Lewis & L.A.Lewis 2013, genus Pseudomuriella.
            - Family Scenedesmaceae Oltmanns 1904, genera Asterarcys, Chodatodesmus, Coelastrella, Coelastrum, Desmodesmus, Dimorphococcus, Scenedesmus, Flechtneria, Hariotina, Pectinodesmus, Tetradesmus.
            - Family Schizochlamydaceae Fučíková, P.O.Lewis & L.A.Lewis 2013, genera Planktosphaeria, Schizochlamys.
            - Family Selenastraceae Blackman & Tansley 1903 (=Ankistrodesmaceae Korshikov 1953), genera Ankistrodesmus, Apodococcus, Chlorobion, Curvastrum, Kirchneriella, Mesastrum, Monoraphidium, Nephrochlamys, Ourococcus, Podohedriella, Quadrigula, Raphidocelis, Rhombocystis, Selenastrum, Tetranephris, Viridiparva.
            - Family Radiococcaceae, genera Radiococcus, Follicularia, Coenochloris, Garhundacystis, Gloeocystis, Coenocystis, Neocystis.
            - Family Rotundellaceae Fučíková, P.O.Lewis & L.A.Lewis 2013, genus Rotundella.
            - Family Tumidellaceae Fučíková, P.O.Lewis & L.A.Lewis 2013, genus Tumidella.
        - Order Volvocales Poche 1913 (=Chlamydomonadales Fritsch in West & Fritsch 1927). Basal genera: Desmotetra, Hafniomonas, Tetraflagellochloris, Corbierea (=Carteria-Clade I; clade Radicarteria), Staurocarteria (=Carteria-Clade II; clade Crucicarteria).
          - Clade Chloromonadinia Nakada, Misawa & Nozaki 2008, genera Chloromonas, Gloeomonas, Chlainomonas, Ixipapillifera.
          - Clade Oogamochlamydinia Nakada, Misawa & Nozaki 2008, genera Asterococcus, Gymnomonas, Hapalochloris, Lobochlamys, Oogamochlamys, Palmellopsis, Rhysamphichloris, Sarcinochlamys.
          - Clade Tatrensinia Nakada, Misawa & Nozaki 2008, genus "Chlamydomonas" in part.
          - Clade Caudivolvoxa Nakada, Misawa & Nozaki 2008
            - Clade Arenicolinia Nakada, Misawa & Nozaki 2008, genus "Chlorosarcinopsis" in part.
            - Clade Characiosiphonia Nakada, Misawa & Nozaki 2008, genera Characiochloris, Characiosiphon, Lobocharacium, Tabris.
            - Clade Chlorogonia Nakada, Misawa & Nozaki 2008, genera Brachiomonas, "Chlamydomonas" in part, "Chlorogonium" in part, Ettlia, Haematococcus, Rusalka.
            - Clade Dunaliellinia Nakada, Misawa & Nozaki 2008, genera "Dunaliella" in part, Gungnir.
            - Clade Polytominia Nakada, Misawa & Nozaki 2008, genera Polytoma, "Chlamydomonas" in part.
            - Clade Stephanosphaerinia Nakada, Misawa & Nozaki 2008 (=order Protosiphonales Ettl & Komárek sensu Kostikov et al. 2001), genera Balticola, Chlamydopodium, Chlorochytrium, "Chlorogonium" in part (incl. type species), "Chlorosarcinopsis" in part (incl. type species), Deasonia, Dunaliella in part, Flexiramia, Gongrosira, Hamakko, Macrochloris, Pachychladella, Pleurastrum, Protosiphon, Rhopasolen, Spongiochloris, Spongiosarcinopsis, Stephanosphaera.
          - Clade Xenovolvoxa Nakada, Misawa & Nozaki 2008
            - Clade Moewusinia Nakada, Misawa & Nozaki 2008, genera Actinochloris, Adglutina, Alvikia, Axilosphaera, Chlorococcum (incl. "Tetracystis" in part), Eubrownia, Oophila, Neospongiococcum, Parachlorococcum, Spongiococcum.
            - Clade Monadinia Nakada, Misawa & Nozaki 2008, genera Microglena, "Chlamydomonas" in part.
            - Clade Phacotinia Nakada, Misawa & Nozaki 2008, genus Phacotus.
          - Clade Reinhardtinia Nakada, Misawa & Nozaki 2008, genera "Chlamydomonas" in part (incl. type species), Vitreochlamys.
            - Family Goniaceae (Pascher) Pascher 1931, genera Astrephomene, Gonium.
            - Family Tetrabaenaceae H.Nozaki & M.Ito 1994, genera Basichlamys, Tetrabaena.
            - Family Volvocaceae Ehrenberg 1834, genera Colemanosphaera, Eudorina, Platydorina, Pleodorina, Volvox, Volvulina, Yamagishiella.
      - OCC clade
        - Order Chaetopeltidales O'Kelly, Watanabe & Floyd
        - Order Chaetophorales Wille 1901
        - Order Oedogoniales Heering 1914
    - Class Trebouxiophyceae Friedl 1995 (=Pleurastrophyceae Mattox et al. 1984)
      - Order Chlorellales H.C.Bold & M.J.Wynne 1978
        - Family Chlorellaceae Brunnthaler 1913, genera Actinastrum, Auxenochlorella, Carolibrandtia, Chlorella, Chloroparva, Closteriopsis, Compactochlorella, Coronacoccus, Coronastrum, Crucigenia, Dicloster, Dictyosphaerium, Didymogenes, Endolithella, Hegewaldia, Helicosporidium, Heynigia, Hindakia, Kalenjinia, Marasphaerium, Marinichlorella, Marvania, Masaia, Meyerella, Micractinium, Mucidosphaerium, Muriella, Nannochloris, Neochlorella, Parachlorella, Picochlorum, Planktochlorella, Prototheca, Pseudochloris, Pumiliosphaera.
    - Class Ulvophyceae^{(P)}

==== Streptophyta ====
Division Streptophyta Bremer & Wanntorp 1981 (=Charophyta Migula 1897 emend. Karol et al. 2009)

- Class Chlorokybophyceae Irisarri et al. 2021, order Chlorokybales Irisarri et al. 2021, family Chlorokybaceae Irisarri et al. 2021, genus Chlorokybus.
- Class Mesostigmatophyceae Marin & Melkonian 1999 emend. Lewis & McCourt 2004 (=Mesostigmata Turmel et al. 2002), order Mesostigmales Cavalier-Smith 1998, family Mesostigmataceae Fott 1947, genus: Mesostigma.
- Class Klebsormidiophyceae C. Jeffrey ex Guiry 2023
  - Order Klebsormidiales Bierenbroodspot et al. 2024, family Klebsormidiaceae Bierenbroodspot et al. 2024, genera Klebsormidium, Interfilum, Streptofilum.
  - Order Entransiales Bierenbroodspot et al. 2024, family Entransiaceae Bierenbroodspot et al. 2024, genus Entransia.
  - Order Hormidiellales Bierenbroodspot et al. 2024, family Hormidiellaceae Bierenbroodspot et al. 2024, genera Hormidiella, Streptosarcina.
- Phragmoplastophyta Lecointre & Guyander 2006
  - Class Charophyceae Smith 1938 emend. Karol et al. 2009
  - Class Coleochaetophyceae Jeffrey 1982
  - Anydrophyta Rensing 2020
    - Class Zygnematophyceae van den Hoek et al. 1995 emend. Hall et al. 2009
      - Subclass Spirogloeophycidae Melkonian, Gontcharov & Marin 2019, order Spirogloeales Melkonian, Gontcharov & Marin 2019, family Spirogloeaceae Melkonian, Gontcharov & Marin 2019, genus Spirogloea.
      - Subclass Zygnematophycidae Melkonian, Gontcharov & Marin 2019
        - Order Serritaeniales S.Hess & J.de Vries 2022, family Serritaeniaceae S.Hess & J.de Vries 2022, genus Serritaenia.
        - Order Zygnematales Bessey 1907 emend. Hess & de Vries 2022, family Zygnemataceae Kützing 1843, genera Cylindrocystis, Mesotaenium^{?}, Mougeotia, Zygnema, Zygnemopsis.
        - Order Desmidiales Bessey 1907 emend. S.Hess & J.de Vries 2022, family Desmidiaceae Ralfs 1848, genera Bambusina, Closterium, Cosmarium, Cosmocladium, Desmidium, Euastrum, Micrasterias, Netrium, Nucleotaenium, Onychonema, Penium, Phymatodocis, Planotaenium, Pleurotaenium, Staurastrum, Staurodesmus, Xanthidium, etc.
        - Order Spirogyrales Clements nom. cons. emend. Hess & de Vries 2022, genus Spirogyra.
    - Kingdom Embryophyta Engler 1886 emend. Lewis & McCourt 2004 (=Plantae Haeckel 1866). Excluded from protists.

== Pancryptista ==
- - Microheliella maris
  - Cryptista
    - Palpitia
      Palpitomonas bilix
    - Rollomonadia
      - Leucocrypta
        Kathablepharidida
      - Cryptomonada
        - Goniomonadea
        - Cryptophyceae

Cladogram of Pancryptista based on 2020 and 2022 analyses.

The phylum Cryptista contains heterotrophic and photosynthetic single-celled flagellates. Its classification has undergone many changes through the years, and several conflicting systems and nomenclatures coexist. It was described by Thomas Cavalier-Smith in 1989 to unite two distinct groups of flagellates: the photosynthetic cryptomonads, and the heterotrophic goniomonads (respectively the two classes Cryptomonadea and Cyathomonadea). The name Cryptista was meant to be a synonym of Cryptophyta, the algal Phylum described by the same author in previous years. In 2004, he modified the classification of Cryptista to add two subphyla: Cryptomonada, containing the aforementioned classes (renamed as Cryptophyceae and Goniomonadea respectively), and Leucocrypta, containing the heterotrophic katablepharids. The next year, a separate group of authors proposed a different higher ranking for katablepharids as a phylum Kathablepharida or Phylum Katablepharidophyta, related to but independent from phylum Cryptophyta, with no mention of Cryptista. Between 2013 and 2015, Cavalier-Smith updated the classification once more by describing three new subphyla: Rollomonadia, containing the previous subphyla lowered to superclasses; Palpitia, containing the flagellate Palpitomonas bilix; and Corbihelia, containing picozoans, telonemids, and some heliozoan species (Heliomorpha and Microheliella). Corbihelia did not reach consensus: later analyses and revisions separated telonemids and picozoans as their own clades, and placed Heliomorpha in Cercozoa. However, the addition of Palpitomonas and the monophyly of Rollomonadia have been supported in other analyses.

Cryptista was redefined in the 2019 ISOP revision as the clade containing Palpitomonas, katablepharids, goniomonads and cryptomonads. However, this revision introduced yet another classification system that is contradictory with the previous ones. They proposed a single class Cryptophyceae uniting cryptomonads, goniomonads and katablepharids, and treated cryptomonads as a single order Cryptomonadales, although this does not follow scientific consensus: there are more cryptomonad orders (e.g., Pyrenomonadales, Tetragonidiales) and the name Cryptophyceae was already used for taxa that excluded katablepharids and often excluded goniomonads too. There has not been a new revision since.

Unlike with Heliomorpha, the genus Microheliella was genetically sequenced and its affinities have been resolved. In 2022, it was proposed as the sister group of Cryptista, in a clade known as Pancryptista.

Pancryptista Yazaki et al. 2022

- Order Microhelida Cavalier-Smith & Chao 2012, family Microheliellidae Cavalier-Smith & Chao 2012, genus Microheliella.
- Phylum Cryptista Cavalier-Smith 1989 emend. Adl et al. 2019
  - Subphylum Palpitia Cavalier-Smith & Chao 2012, class Palpitea Cavalier-Smith & Chao 2012, order Palpitida Cavalier-Smith & Chao 2012, family Palpitomonadidae Cavalier-Smith & Chao 2012, genus Palpitomonas.
  - Subphylum Rollomonadia Cavalier-Smith 2013 (=Cryptophyta Silva 1962; Cryptophyta Cavalier-Smith 1986; Cryptophyceae Pascher 1913 emend. Schoenichen 1925 emend. Adl et al. 2012)
    - Superclass Leucocrypta Cavalier-Smith 2004 stat. nov. 2013 (="phylum" Kathablepharida (Katablepharidophyta) Okamoto & Inouye 2005), class Leucocryptea Cavalier-Smith 2004 (=Kathablepharidea (Katablepharidophyceae) Okamoto & Inouye 2005), order Kathablepharidida (Katablepharidales) Okamoto & Inouye 2005, family "Kathablepharididae" Vørs 1992 emend. Clay & Kugrens 1999 (Katablepharidaceae Skuja 1939), genera Hatena, Kathablepharis, Leucocryptos, Platychilomonas, Roombia.
    - Superclass Cryptomonada Cavalier-Smith 2004
      - Class Goniomonadea Cavalier-Smith 1993 (=Cyathomonadea Cavalier-Smith 1989) (Note: The 2019 revision by the ISOP inaccurately stated that goniomonads are classified as "Cyathomonadacea Pringsheim 1944". The name Cyathomonadacea does not exist; Pringsheim only described the family Cyathomonadaceae based on the genus Cyathomonas, and later the order Cyathomonadales and class Cyathomonadea were described, each by different authors. However, as pointed out in 1993 by Gianfranco Novarino and Ian Lucas, this genus was based on a species that actually belonged to Goniomonas; since then, taxonomists have prioritized higher taxa named after it (Goniomonadaceae, Goniomonadales/adida, Goniomonadea) instead.)
        - Order Goniomonadida (Goniomonadales) Novarino & Lucas 1993 (=Cyathomonadales Lee 1989), genera Aquagoniomonas, Baltigoniomonas, Cosmogoniomonas, Limnogoniomonas, Marigoniomonas, Naiadagoniomonas, Neptunogoniomonas, Poseidogoniomonas, Thalassogoniomonas.
          - Family Goniomonadidae (Goniomonadaceae) Hill 1991 (=Cyathomonadaceae Pringsheim 1944), genus Goniomonas (=Cyathomonas).
        - Order Hemiarmida Cavalier-Smith 2018, family Hemiarmidae Cavalier-Smith 2018, genus Hemiarma.
      - Class Cryptophyceae Fritsch in West & Fritsch 1927 (Cryptomonadea Stein 1878 stat. nov. Pascher ex Schoenichen 1925). Genera incertae sedis: Bjornbergiella, Cyanomonas, Plagioselmis.
        - Order Cryptomonadales Pascher 1913 emend. Clay et al. 1999
          - Family Baffinellaceae Daugbjerg & Norlin 2018, genus Baffinella.
          - Family Cryptomonadaceae Clay et al. 1999, genera Cryptomonas, Chilomonas.
        - Order Pyrenomonadales Clay et al. 1999
          - Family Pyrenomonadaceae Novarino & Lucas 1993, genera Pyrenomonas (=Rhodomonas), Storeatula, Rhinomonas.
          - Family Geminigeraceae Clay et al. 1999, genera Geminigera, Teleaulax, Hanusia, Guillardia, Proteomonas.
          - Family Chroomonadaceae Clay et al. 1999, genera Chroomonas, Falcomonas, Komma.
          - Family Hemiselmidaceae Butcher 1967, genus Hemiselmis.
        - Order Tetragonidiales Kristiansen 1992, family Tetragonidiaceae Bourrelly ex Silva 1980, genus Tetragonidium. (Note: The genus Tetragonidium is known only from one written diagnosis and some illustrations, and its affinities with cryptomonads are very uncertain.)

== Haptista ==
- Haptophyta Hibberd 1976 ex. Edvardsen & Eikrem 2000
  - Pavlovales Green 1976 [Pavlovophyceae Cavalier-Smith 1986]. Diacronema, Exanthemachrysis, Pavlova, Rebecca.
  - Prymnesiophyceae Hibberd 1976
    - Prymnesiales Papenfuss 1955, emend. Edvardsen & Eikrem 2000. Chrysochromulina, Chrysocampanula, Dicrateria, Haptolina, Prymnesium, Pseudohaptolina.
    - Phaeocystales Medlin 2000. Phaeocystis.
    - Isochrysidales Pascher 1910, emend. Edvardsen & Eikrem 2000. Emiliania, Gephyrocapsa, Isochrysis, Ruttnera, Tisochrysis.
    - Coccolithales Schwarz 1932, emend. Edvardsen & Eikrem 2000. Balaniger, Calciosolenia, Coccolithus, Hymenomonas, Chrysotila, Wigwamma.
  - Rappephyceae M. Kawachi, R. Kamikawa & T. Nakayama 2021
    - Pavlomulinales M. Kawachi & I. Inouye 2021. Pavlomulina.
- Class Centroplasthelida Febvre-Chevalier & Febvre 1984 (=Centrohelea Kühn 1926 sensu Cavalier-Smith in Yabuki et al. 2012; Centroheliozoa Dürrschmidt & Patterson 1987). Genera incertae sedis: Meringosphaera, Parasphaerastrum.
  - Family Spiculophryidae Shɨshkin & Zlatogursky 2018, genus Spiculophrys.
  - Superorder Pterocystida Cavalier-Smith and von der Heyden 2007, emend. Shɨshkin and Zlatogursky 2018
    - Order Raphidista Shɨshkin & Zlatogursky 2018
      - Family Choanocystidae Cavalier-Smith & von der Heyden 2007, genus Choanocystis.
      - Family Raphidiophryidae Febvre-Chevalier & Febvre 1984, emend. Shɨshkin & Zlatogursky 2018, genus Raphidiophrys.
    - Order Pterista Shɨshkin & Zlatogursky 2018
      - Family Oxnerellidae Cavalier-Smith & Chao 2012, genus Oxnerella.
      - Family Pterocystidae Cavalier-Smith & von der Heyden 2007, genera Pterocystis, Raineriophrys, Chlamydaster, Pseudoraphidiophrys, Pseudoraphidocystis, Triangulopteris, Khitsovia.
      - Family Heterophryidae Poche 1913, emend. Cavalier-Smith & von der Heyden 2007, genera Heterophrys, Sphaerastrum.
      - Family Clypiferidae Shɨshkin in Shɨshkin et al. 2021, genus Clypifer.
  - Superorder Panacanthocystida Shɨshkin & Zlatogursky 2018
    - Order Chthonida Shɨshkin & Zlatogursky 2018, suborder Yogsothothina Shɨshkin & Zlatogursky 2018, family Yogsothothidae Shɨshkin & Zlatogursky 2018, genera Yogsothoth, Pinjata.
    - Order Acanthocystida Cavalier-Smith & von der Heyden 2007 emend. Shɨshkin & Zlatogursky 2018
      - Suborder Marophryina Cavalier-Smith in Yabuki et al. 2012, family Marophryidae Cavalier-Smith & von der Heyden 2007 emend. Shɨshkin & Zlatogursky 2018, genus Marophrys.
      - Suborder Chalarothoracina Hertwig & Lesser 1874 sensu Cavalier-Smith in Yabuki et al. 2012 emend. Shɨshkin & Zlatogursky 2018
        - Family Acanthocystidae Claus 1874 emend. Shɨshkin & Zlatogursky 2018, genus Acanthocystis.
        - Family Raphidocystidae Zlatogursky 2018, genus Raphidocystis.

== Stramenopiles ==
- Class Platysulcea Cavalier-Smith 2018 → order Platysulcida Cavalier-Smith 2018 → family Platysulcidae Shiratori, Nakayama & Ishida 2015. Sole genus: Platysulcus Shiratori, Nakayama & Ishida 2015.

=== Bigyra ===
Bigyra was initially proposed as a phylum of heterotrophic protists closely related to the photosynthetic heterokonts (Ochrophyta). It contained three subphyla: Pseudofungi (oomycetes and hyphochytrids), Bigyromonada (free-living biflagellates), and Opalinata (large multi-flagellated gut symbionts). The phylum was proposed with a unifying characteristic, the presence of a flagellar transition zone with double helices or rings. This definition was later modified to exclude both Pseudofungi and Bigyromonada, and it was instead reduced to two different subphyla: Opalozoa (including Opalinata and bicosoecids) and Sagenista. Prior to this, Sagenista itself was also a phylum containing bicosoecids and labyrinthuleans, but it got reduced to only labyrinthuleans and a few flagellates.

The current definition of Bigyra is paraphyletic according to some phylogenetic analyses, with Sagenista more closely related to Gyrista. Despite its probable paraphyly, most taxonomists continue to use it, and it was recognized in the 2019 revision by the ISOP, which prioritizes monophyletic taxa. Its global classification was last revised by Cavalier-Smith in 2013 and 2018, while the specific class Placididea was revised in 2021, with new taxa described by Alexandra Rybarski and coauthors, and the classes Labyrinthulea and Opalinea were revised in-depth in the 2017 Handbook of the protists.

Phylum Bigyra^{(P?)} Cavalier-Smith 1998 emend. 2013

- Subphylum Opalozoa Cavalier Smith 1991 emend. 2006
  - Infraphylum Placidozoa Cavalier-Smith 2013
    - Superclass Wobblata^{(P)} Cavalier-Smith in Cavalier-Smith and Chao, 2006 stat. n. 2013
      - Class Placididea Moriya, Nakayama & Inouye 2002, order Placidida Moriya, Nakayama & Inouye 2002, family Placididae Moriya, Nakayama & Inouye 2002, genera Allegra, Haloplacidia, Pendulomonas, Placidia, Placilonga, Suigetsumonas, Wobblia.
      - Class Nanomonadea Cavalier-Smith in Cavalier-Smith & Scoble 2013 (=clade MAST-3), order Uniciliatida Cavalier-Smith in Cavalier-Smith & Scoble 2013
        - Family Incisomonadidae Cavalier-Smith in Cavalier-Smith & Scoble 2013, genus Incisomonas.
        - Family Solenicolidae Cavalier-Smith in Cavalier-Smith & Scoble 2013, genus Solenicola.
      - Class Opalomonadea Cavalier-Smith 2013 (=clade MAST-12), no described species.
    - Superclass Opalinata Wenyon 1926 emend. Cavalier-Smith 1997
      - Class Blastocystea Zierdt et al. 1967, order Blastocystida Zierdt 1978, family Blastocystidae Jiang & He 1988, genus Blastocystis.
      - Class Opalinea Wenyon 1926 (=Slopalinida Patterson 1985)
        - Order Proteromonadida Grassé 1952 emend. Cavalier-Smith 1993, family Proteromonadidae Grassé 1952, genus Proteromonas (="Prowazekella").
        - Order Opalinida Poche 1913 stat. nov. Hall 1953 emend. Cavalier-Smith 2013
          - Family Karotomorphidae Travis 1934, genus Karotomorpha.
          - Family Opalinidae Claus 1874, genera Cepedea, Opalina, Protoopalina, Protozelleriella, Zelleriella.
  - Infraphylum Bikosia Cavalier-Smith 2018 (=Bicosoecida Grassé 1926 emend. Karpov 1998), class Bikosea Cavalier-Smith 1986 as "Bicosoecea" orth. emend. 2013.
    - Family Pseudobodonidae Cavalier-Smith in Cavalier-Smith & Scoble 2013, genus Pseudobodo.
    - Subclass Bicosidia^{(P?)} Cavalier-Smith in Cavalier-Smith & Chao 2006. Genera not assigned to any order: Halocafeteria, Cafileria.
      - Order Borokales (Borokida) Cavalier-Smith in Cavalier-Smith & Chao 2006, family Borokaceae (Borokida) Cavalier-Smith in Cavalier-Smith & Chao 2006, genus Boroka.
      - Order Anoecales^{(P?)} (Anoecida) Cavalier-Smith 1997 (Note: Within the order Anoecida, the four families Anoecaceae, Caecitellaceae, Cafeteriaceae and Symbiomonadaceae were included by T. Cavalier-Smith in 2006. In a 2013 revision, he simplified the classification by transferring Symbiomonadaceae and Anoecaceae to Cafeteriaceae. However, both of those families remain accepted by the scientific community as independent from Cafeteriaceae as of 2020.) Genus not assigned to any lower taxon: Bilabrum.
        - Family Anoecaceae Cavalier-Smith in Cavalier-Smith & Chao 2006, genus Anoeca.
        - Family Caecitellaceae (Caecitellidae) Cavalier-Smith in Cavalier-Smith & Chao 2006, genus Caecitellus.
        - Family Cafeteriaceae (Cafeteriidae) Moestrup 1995, genus Cafeteria.
        - Family Symbiomonadaceae Cavalier-Smith in Cavalier-Smith & Chao 2006, genus Symbiomonas.
      - Order Bicoecida (Bicoecales) Grassé 1926
        - Family Bicosoecidae (Bicosoecaceae) Stein 1878, genera Bicosoeca, Stephanocodon, Poteriodendron, Hirugamonas.
        - Family Labromonadidae (Labromonadaceae) Cavalier-Smith in Cavalier-Smith & Chao 2006, genus Labromonas.
      - Order Pseudodendromonadida ("Pseudodendromonadales") Hibberd 1985 emend. Cavalier-Smith 2006.
        - Family Pseudodendromonadidae ("Pseudodendromonadaceae") Karpov 2000, genera Cyathobodo, Pseudodendromonas.
        - Family Siluaniidae^{(P)} (Siluaniaceae) Karpov 1998, genera Adriamonas, Siluania, Otto, Regin.
        - Family Paramonadidae Kent 1880, genus Paramonas.
        - Family Nanidae Cavalier-Smith in Cavalier-Smith & Scoble 2013, genus Nanum (="Nanos").
        - Family Neradidae Cavalier-Smith in Cavalier-Smith & Chao 2006, genus Nerada.
        - Family Filidae Cavalier-Smith in Cavalier-Smith & Scoble 2013, genus Filos.
    - Infraphylum incertae sedis
      - Order Rictida Cavalier-Smith in Cavalier-Smith & Scoble 2013, family Rictidae Cavalier-Smith in Cavalier-Smith & Scoble 2013, genus Rictus.
      - Cantina Yubuki et al. 2015
- Subphylum Sagenista Cavalier-Smith 1995
  - Class Labyrinthulea L.S.Olive 1975 ex Cavalier-Smith 1989 (Labyrinthulomycetes Arx 1970 ex Dick 2001) (='phylum' Labyrinthomorpha Page in Levine et al. 1980 (Labyrinthulomycota Whittaker 1969))
    - Order Amphitremida (Poche 1913) Gomaa et al. 2013
      - Family Amphitremidae Poche 1913, genera Amphitrema, Archerella, Paramphitrema.
      - Family Diplophryidae Cavalier-Smith in Anderson & Cavalier-Smith 2012, genus Diplophrys.
    - Order Amphifilida Cavalier-Smith in Anderson & Cavalier-Smith 2012 as "Amphifiloidea"
      - Family Amphifilidae Cavalier-Smith in Anderson & Cavalier-Smith 2012, genus Amphifila.
      - Family Sorodiplophryidae Cavalier-Smith in Anderson & Cavalier-Smith 2012, genera Fibrophrys, Sorodiplophrys.
    - Order Oblongichytrida (Oblongichytriales) Bennett et al. 2017, family Oblongichytriidae (Oblongichytriaceae) Cavalier-Smith in Anderson & Cavalier-Smith 2012, genus Oblongichytrium.
    - Order Labyrinthulida Doffein 1901 (Labyrinthulales E.A.Bessey 1950). Genus not assigned to any family: Stellarchytrium.
      - Family Aplanochytriidae (Aplanochytriaceae) Leander ex Cavalier-Smith in Anderson & Cavalier-Smith 2012, genus Aplanochytrium (=Labyrinthuloides).
      - Family Labyrinthulidae Cienkowski 1867 (Labyrinthulaceae Haeckel 1868), genus Labyrinthula (=Pseudoplasmodium, Labyrinthodictyon, Labyrinthorhiza).
    - Order Thraustochytrida (Thraustochytriales) Sparrow 1943
      - Family Althorniidae (Althornidiaceae) Jones & Alderman 1973, genus Althornia.
      - Family Thraustochytriidae (Thraustochytriaceae) Sparrow ex Cejp 1959, genera Aurantiochytrium, Botryochytrium, Japonochytrium, Monorhizochytrium, Parietichytrium, Phycophthorum, Schizochytrium, Sicyoidochytrium, Thraustochytrium, Ulkenia.
  - Class Eogyrea Cavalier-Smith 2013, order Eogyrida Cavalier-Smith 2018 (=clade MAST-6). Genera not assigned to any lower taxon: Mastreximonas, Vomastromonas.
    - Family Pseudophyllomitidae (Pseudophyllomitaceae) Shiratori et al. 2017, genus Pseudophyllomitus.

=== Gyrista ===
- Kaonashiidae Weston, Eglit & Simpson 2023. Kaonashia.
- Pseudofungi Cavalier-Smith 1986 (=Heterokontimycotina M.W. Dick 1976, Peronosporomycotina M.W.Dick 2001)
  - Bigyromonadea Cavalier-Smith 1997
    - Developea Aleoshin et al. 2016. Cubaremonas Tikhonenkov, Cho, and Keeling 2022, Develoamica Prokina et al. 2026, Develocanicus Tikhonenkov, Cho, Mylnikov, and Keeling 2022, Develocauda Tikhonenkov, Cho, and Keeling 2022, Developarva Prokina et al. 2026, Developayella Tong 1995, Develorapax Karpov & Aleoshin 2016, Mediocremonas del Campo and Weiler 2020.
    - Pirsoniales Cavalier-Smith & Chao 2006 emend. Prokina et al. 2024. Genera not assigned to any lower taxon: Bordeauxia Prokina et al. 2024; Bullionia Prokina et al. 2024; Feodosia Prokina et al. 2024; Koktebelia Prokina et al. 2024.
      - Pirsoniaceae Cavalier & Chao 2006. Noirmoutieria Prokina et al. 2024; Pirsonia Schnepf, Debres & Elbrachter 1990.
  - Hyphochytriomycetes^{ICN} Sparrow ex M.W.Dick 1983 (Hyphochytrea^{ICZN} Cavalier-Smith 1986). Genus not assigned to any lower taxon: Hyphochytrium Karling 1939.
    - Anisolpidiaceae Karling 1943 emend. Dick 2001. Anisolpidium Karling 1943; Canteriomyces Sparrow 1960.
    - Rhizidiomycetaceae Karling 1943. Latrostium Zopf 1894; Rhizidiomyces Zopf 1884; Rhizidiomycopsis Sparrow 1960.
  - Peronosporomycetes Dick 2001 (=Peronosporomycetes Winter 1897, emend. Dick 1976). Incertae sedis: Atkinsiella Vishniac 1958; Ciliatomyces Foissner & Foissner 1995 (=Ciliomyces Foissner & Foissner 1986); Crypticola Humber et al. 1989; Ectrogella Zopf 1884; Eurychasma Magnus 1905; Halodaphnea M.W.Dick 1998; Haliphthoros Vishniac 1958; Haptoglossa Drechsler 1940; Lagena Vanterp. & Ledingham 1930; Lagenisma Drebes 1968; Olpidiopsis Cornu 1872; Pontisma H.E. Petersen 1905; Pythiella Couch 1935; Rozellopsis Karling 1942; Sirolpidium H.E.Petersen 1905.
    - Saprolegnialean lineage Lara in Adl et al. 2019. Achlya Nees 1823; Aphanomyces de Bary 1860; Aplanopsis Höhnk 1952; Apodachlya Pringsh. 1883; Aquastella S.L.Glockling & D.P. Molloy 2014; Geolegnia Coker & J.V.Harv. 1925; Leptomitus (Roth) C.Agardh 1824; Newbya M.W.Dick & M.A.Spencer 2002; Pythiopsis de Bary 1888; Protoachlya Cocker 1923; Salisapilia Hulvey, Nigrelli, Telle, Lamour & Thines 2010; Saprolegnia Nees 1823; Thraustotheca Humphrey 1893.
    - Peronosporalean lineage Lara in Adl et al. 2019. Albugo (Pers.) Roussel ex Gray 1821; Bremia Regel 1843; Chlamydomyzium M.W.Dick 1997; Halophytopthora H.H.Ho & S.C.Jong 1990; Hyaloperonospora Constant. in Constant. & J.Fatehi 2002; Lagenidium Zopf 1859; Myzocytiopsis M.W.Dick 1997; Peronospora Corda 1837; Plasmopara J.Schröt. 1886; Pythium Pringsh. 1858; Pseudoperonospora Rostovzez 1903; Phytophthora de Bary 1975; Phytopythium Abad, De Cock, Bala, Robideau, A.M.Lodhi & Lévesque in Bala et al. 2010; Pustula Thines 2005.
- Ochrophyta Cavalier-Smith 1986, emend. Cavalier-Smith & Chao 1996 (=Heterokontophyta Guiry, R.A.Andersen & Moestrup 2023)
  - Chrysista Cavalier-Smith 1986. Incertae sedis: Chrysoderma C.Billard 1984 nom. inval.; Chrysomeris Carter 1937; Chrysonephos W.R.Taylor 1952; "Giraudyopsis" Dangeard 1965 nom. inval.; Rhamnochrysis Wilce & Markey 1974. (Note: O'Kelly placed the genera Antarctosaccion, Chrysomeris, Chrysonephos, Nematochrysis/Chrysowaernella, Phaeosaccion and Rhamnochrysis in the order Chrysomeridales nomen nudum in 1989, and Cavalier-Smith placed it inside the class Chrysomeridophyceae (spelt originally as Chrysomerophycea) in 1995. However, the class was proven to be polyphyletic. As a result, some of its genera (Nematochrysis/Chrysowaerella) were transferred to the class Chrysoparadoxophyceae, while others (Antarctosaccion and Phaeosaccion) were transferred to the class Phaeosacciophyceae. Due to a lack of molecular data, the placement of Chrysomeris, Chrysonephos and Rhamnochrysis remains unknown.)
    - Eustigmatophyceae Hibberd & Leedale 1971 (Note: The position of Eustigmatophyceae is still unstable, with different phylogenetic methodologies showing affinities to either of the SI and SII clades.)
      - Goniochloridales K.P.Fawley, M.Eliáš & M.W.Fawley 2013. Goniochloris Geitler 1928; Pseudostaurastrum Chodat 1921; Tetraedriella Pascher 1930 nom. cons.; Trachydiscus H.Ettl 1964; Trebonskia Přibyl & Procházková 2022; Vacuoliviride Nakayama, Nakamura, Yokoyama, Shiratori, Inouye & Ishida 2015.
      - Eustigmatales Hibberd 1981
        - Paraeustigmatos M.W.Fawley, Nĕmcová & K.P.Fawley 2019
        - Eustigmataceae Hibberd 1981. Ellipsoidion Pascher 1938; Chlorobotrys Bohlin 1901; Eustigmatos Hibberd 1981; Pseudocharaciopsis K.W.Lee & Bold 1973; Vischeria Pascher 1938.
        - Monodopsidaceae Hibberd 1981 (includes Loboceae Hedgewald in Hedgewald, Padisak & Friedl 2007). Microchloropsis M.W.Fawley, I.Jameson & K.P.Fawley 2015; Monodopsis Hibberd 1981; Nannochloropsis Hibberd 1981; Pseudotetraedriella Hedgewald in Hedgewald, Padisak & Friedl 2007.
        - Neomonodaceae R.Amaral, K.P.Fawley, Nĕmcová, T.Ševčíková, Lukešová, M.W.Fawley, L.M.A.Santos & M.Eliáš 2020. Botryochloropsis Preisig & Wilhelm 1989; Characiopsella R.Amaral, K.P.Fawley, Nĕmcová, T.Ševčíková, Lukešová, M.W.Fawley, L.M.A.Santos & M.Eliáš 2020; Munda R.Amaral, K.P.Fawley, Nĕmcová, T.Ševčíková, Lukešová, M.W.Fawley, L.M.A.Santos & M.Eliáš 2020; Neomonodus R.Amaral, K.P.Fawley, Nĕmcová, T.Ševčíková, Lukešová, M.W.Fawley, L.M.A.Santos & M.Eliáš 2020; Pseudellipsoidion (Neustupa & Nĕmcová) Nĕmcová emend. Amaral et al. 2020.
    - SII clade
      - Olisthodiscophyceae Barcytė, Eikrem & M. Eliáš 2021 → Olisthodiscus.
      - Pinguiophyceae Kawachi, Inouye, Honda, O'Kelly, Bailey, Bidigare & R.A.Andersen 2002. Glossomastix O'Kelly 2002; Phaeomonas Honda & Inouye 2002; Pinguiochrysis Kawachi 2002; Pinguiococcus R.A.Andersen, D.Potter & J.C.Bailey 2002; Polypodochrysis Magne 1975.
      - SSC clade
        - Chrysophyceae Pascher 1914. Incertae sedis taxa: Chryososaccus, Chrysosphera, Cyclonexis, Lygynion, Phaeoplaca.
          - Chromulinales Pascher 1910. Chromulina, Chrysomonas.
          - Hibberdiales Andersen 1989. Hibberdia.
          - Ochromonadales Pascher 1910. Spumella, Pedospumella, Ochromonas.
          - Paraphysomonadida Scoble & Cavalier-Smith 2014. Paraphysomonas.
          - Synurales Andersen 1987. Chrysodidymus, Mallomonas, Synura, Tesselaria.
        - Picophagea Cavalier-Smith 2006 emend. 2018 [Synchromophyceae S.Horn & C.Wilhelm 2007]. Chlamydomyxa, Chrysopodocystis, Guanochroma, Leukarachnion, Picophagus, Synchroma.
    - SI clade
      - Raphidophyceae Chadefaud 1950 ex Silva 1980 → order Chattonellales Throndsen in Tomas 1993 emend. Yamaguchi, Nakayama, Murakami & Inouye 2010 (=Vacuolariales Shameel, 2001). Chattonella, Fibrocapsa, Goniostomum, Haramonas, Heterosigma, Merotricha, Vacuolaria.
      - PX clade
        - Chrysoparadoxophyceae Wetherbee in Wetherbee et al. 2019 → order Chrysoparadoxales Wetherbee in Wetherbee et al. 2019 → family Chrysoparadoxaceae Wetherbee in Wetherbee et al. 2019. Chrysoparadoxa Wetherbee in Wetherbee et al. 2019; Nematochrysis Pascher 1925 (=Chrysowaernella Gayral & Lepailleur 1971).
        - Phaeophyceae Hansgirg 1886 [Kjellman 1891; Pfitzer 1894]
          - Ascoseirales Petrov 1964. Ascoseira.
          - Desmarestiales Setchell & Gardner 1925. Arthrocladia, Desmarestia^{(P)}, Himantothallus, Phaeurus.
          - Dictyotales Bory de Saint-Vincent 1828. Dictyota, Dilophus, Lobophora, Padina, Stypopodium, Taonia, Zonaria.
          - Discosporangiales Kawai et al. 2007. Choristocarpus, Discosporangium.
          - Ectocarpales Bessey 1907, emend. Silva & Reviers 2000. Adenocystis, Acinetospora, Asterocladon, Asteronema, Chordaria, Ectocarpus, Scytosiphon.
          - Fucales Bory de Saint-Vincent 1927. Ascophyllum, Bifurcaria, Cystoseira, Druvillaea, Fucus, Hormosira, Sargassum, Turbinaria.
          - Ishigeales Cho et al. 2004 [Ishigeacea Okamura 1935]. Ishige.
          - Laminariales Migula 1908. Akkesiophycus, Alaria, Chorda, Costaria, Laminaria, Lessonia, Pseudochoda.
          - Nemodermatales Parente et al. 2008. Nemoderma.
          - Onslowiales Draisma & Prud'homme van Reine 2008. Onslowia.
          - Ralfsiales Nakamura ex Lim & Kawai 2007. Lithoderma, Neoralfsia, Pseudolithoderma, Ralfsia.
          - Scytothamnales Peters & Clayton 1998. Scytothamnus, Splachnidium, Stereocladon.
          - Sphacelariales Migula 1908. Chaetopteris, Halopteris, Stypocaulon, Sphacelaria, Verosphacella.
          - Sporochnales Sauvageau 1926. Bellotia, Carpomitra, Nereia, Sporochonus, Tomaculopsis.
          - Syringodermatales Henry 1984. Syringoderma.
          - Tilopteridales Bessey 1907. Cutleria, Halosiphon, Haplospora, Phaeosiphoniella, Phyllaria, Tilopteris.
        - Phaeosacciophyceae R.A.Andersen, L.Graf & H.S.Yoon in Graf et al. 2020 → order Phaeosacciales R.A.Andersen, L.Graf & H.S.Yoon in Graf et al. 2020
          - Phaeosaccionaceae J. Feldmann 1949. Antarctosaccion Delépine 1970; Phaeosaccion Farlow 1882.
          - Tetrasporopsidaceae R.A.Andersen, L.Graf & H.S.Yoon in Graf et al. 2020. Tetrasporopsis Lemmermann 1899; Psammochrysis R.Wetherbee in Graf et al. 2020.
        - Phaeothamniophyceae Andersen & Bailey in Bailey et al. 1998
          - Phaeothamniales Bourrelly 1954, emend. Andersen & Bailey in Bailey et al. 1998. Phaeothamnion.
          - Pleurochloridales Ettl 1956. Pleurochloridella.
        - Schizocladiophyceae Henry, Okuda & Kawai 2003. Schizocladia.
        - Xanthophyceae Allorge 1930, emend. Fritsch 1935 [Heterokontae Luther 1899; Heteromonadea Leedale 1983; Xanthophyta Hibberd 1990]
          - Tribonematales Pascher 1939. Botrydium, Bumilleriopsis, Characiopsis, Chloromeson, Heterococcus, Monadus, Ophiocytium, Sphaerosorus, Tribonema, Xanthonema.
          - Vaucheriales Bohlin 1901. Vaucheria.
  - Diatomista Derelle et al. 2016, emend. Cavalier-Smith 2018 [SIII clade]. Incertae sedis taxa: environmental clades MOCH-1, MOCH-2 and MOCH-4 Massana et al. 2014.
    - Bolidophyceae Guillou et al. 1999 [Parmales Booth & Marchant 1987]. Bolidomonas, Triparma, Tetraparma, Pentalamina.
    - Diatomeae Dumortier 1821 [Bacillariophyta Haeckel 1878]
      - Leptocylindrophytina D.G. Mann, in Adl et al. 2019
        - Leptocylindrophyceae D.G. Mann, in Adl et al. 2019. Leptocylindrus, Tenuicylindrus.
        - Corethrophyceae D.G. Mann, in Adl et al. 2019. Corethron.
      - Ellerbeckiophytina D.G. Mann, in Adl et al. 2019. Ellerbeckia.
      - Probosciophytina D.G. Mann, in Adl et al. 2019. Proboscia.
      - Melosirophytina D.G. Mann, in Adl et al. 2019. Aulacoseira, Melosira, Hyalodiscus, Stephanopyxis, Paralia, Endictya.
      - Coscinodiscophytina Medlin & Kaczmarska 2004, emend. Adl et al. 2019. Actinoptychus, Coscinodiscus, Actinocyclus, Asteromphalus, Aulacodiscus, Stellarima.
      - Rhizosoleniophytina D.G. Mann, in Adl et al. 2019. Guinardia, Rhizosolenia, Pseudosolenia.
      - Arachnoidiscophytina D.G. Mann, in Adl et al. 2019. Arachnoidiscus.
      - Bacillariophytina Medlin & Kaczmarska 2004, emend. Adl et al. 2019
        - Mediophyceae Jouse & Proshkina-Lavrenko in Medlin & Kaczmarska 2004
          - Chaetocerotophycidae Round & R.M. Crawford in Round et al. 1990, emend. Adl et al. 2019. Chaetoceros, Bacteriastrum, Dactyliosolen, Cerataulina, Hemiaulus, Eucampia, Acanthoceras, Urosolenia, Terpsinoë, Hydrosera.
          - Lithodesmiophycidae Round & R.M. Crawford in Round et al. 1990, emend. Adl et al. 2019. Lithodesmium, Lithodesmioides, Helicotheca, Bellerochea, Ditylum.
          - Thalassiosirophycidae Round & R.M. Crawford in Round et al. 1990. Thalassiosira, Lindavia, Cyclotella, Stephanodiscus, Cyclostephanos, Discostella, Bacteriosira, Skeletonema, Detonula.
          - Cymatosirophycidae Round & R.M. Crawford in Round et al. 1990. Cymatosira, Minutocellus, Papiliocellulus, Leyanella, Extubocellulus, Plagiogrammopsis, Campylosira, Brockmanniella, Pierrecomperia.
          - Odontellophycidae D. G. Mann, in Adl et al. 2019. Odontella, Triceratium, Cerataulus, Pleurosira, Pseudauliscus, Amphitetras, Trieres, Mastodiscus.
          - Chrysanthemodiscophycidae D.G. Mann, in Adl et al. 2019. Chrysanthemodiscus, Biddulphiopsis, Trigonium, Isthmia, Lampriscus, Stictocyclus, Ardissonea, Climacosphenia, Toxarium.
        - Biddulphiophyceae D. G. Mann, in Adl et al. 2019
          - Biddulphiophycidae Round and R.M. Crawford in Round et al. 1990, emend. Adl et al. 2019. Biddulphia.
          - Attheya T. West 1860
        - Bacillariophyceae Haeckel 1878, emend. Adl et al. 2019
          - Striatellaceae Kützing 1844. Striatella, Pseudostriatella.
          - Urneidophycidae^{(P?)} Medlin 2016. Plagiogramma, Dimeregramma, Rhaphoneis, Delphineis, Psammoneis, Bleakeleya, Asterionellopsis.
          - Fragilariophycidae Round in Round, Crawford & Mann 1990, emend. Adl et al. 2019. Fragilaria, Synedra, Tabellaria, Asterionella, Diatoma, Tabularia, Cyclophora, Astrosyne, Licmophora, Rhabdonema, Grammatophora, Staurosira, Thalassionema.
          - Bacillariophycidae D.G. Mann in Round, Crawford & Mann 1990, emend. Adl et al. 2019. Eunotia, Achnanthes, Bacillaria, Nitzschia, Pseudonitzschia, Cylindrotheca, Navicula, Seminavis, Haslea, Pleurosigma, Gyrosigma, Achnanthidium, Cocconeis, Frustulia, Diploneis, Sellaphora, Pinnularia, Gomphonema, Cymbella, Didymosphenia, Phaeodactylum, Amphora, Entomoneis, Epithemia, Surirella, etc.
            - Naviculales Bessey 1907
              - Stauroneidaceae D.G. Mann in Round, Crawford & Mann 1990. Craticula, Dorofeyukea, Fistulifera, Karayevia, Madinithidium, Parlibellus, Prestauroneis, Stauroneis, Schizostauron.
    - Dictyochophyceae Silva 1980 [Silicoflagellata Lemmermann, 1901]
      - Dictyochales Haeckel 1894 [Dictyochida Borgert, 1891; Dictyochaceae Lemmermann, 1901]. Dictyocha.
      - Florenciellales Eikrem, Edvardsen & Throndsen 2007. Florenciella, Verrucophora.
      - Pedinellales Zimmermann et al. 1984 [Ciliophryida Febre-Chevalier, 1985; Actinomonadaceae Kent, 1880]. Actinomonas, Apedinella, Ciliophrys, Mesopedinella, Palatinella, Pedinella, Pseudopedinella, Pteridomonas.
      - Rhizochromulinales O'Kelly & Wujek 1994 [Rhizochromulinaceae O'Kelly & Wujek, 1994]. Rhizochromulina.
    - Pelagophyceae Andersen & Saunders 1993
      - Pelagomonadales Andersen & Saunders 1993. Aureococcus, Pelagococcus, Pelagomonas.
      - Sarcinochrysidales Gayral & Billard 1977
        - Sarcinochrysidaceae Gayral & Billard 1977. Ankylochrisis, Arachnochrysis, Aureoscheda, Aureoumbra, Nematochrysopsis, Pelagospilus, Pulvinaria, Sarcinochrysis, Sargassococcus.
        - Chrysocystaceae M.Melkonian, H.S.Yoon & R.A.Andersen 2018. Chrysocystis, Chrysoreinhardia, Sungminbooa.
      - Plocamiomonadales Daugbjerg & Lovejoy 2024. Plocamiomonas.

== Alveolata ==
- - - - - - Myzozoa
            - ACS
              - - Apicomplexa
                - Colpodellida
              - Squirmida
            - Dinozoa
              - Perkinsea
              - Dinoflagellata
        - Neocolponema
      - Palustrimonas
      - - Ciliophora
        - Acavomonas
    - Colponema
  - Loeffela

Cladogram of Alveolata, based on a SSU rDNA phylogeny of basal alveolates and a 203-gene phylogeny of apicomplexans and their relatives published in 2023.

Genera not assigned to any lower taxon: Neocolponema Gigeroff et al. 2023, Loeffela Gigeroff et al. 2023.

- Phylum (Note: The taxonomic ranks above class level (phylum, subphylum, infraphylum, etc.) are unstable within the Alveolata, due to the many different existing classifications. For example, the phylum-level rank has been traditionally assigned to Perkinsozoa, Dinoflagellata, Chromerida and Apicomplexa, all of which have been classified as phylum Myzozoa, which in turn has been classified inside phylum Miozoa. Treating the four myzozoan groups as separate phyla is generally accepted among phycologists, while at the same time the rejection of higher taxonomic ranks due to being superfluous is prevalent among protistologists.) Colponemidia Tikhonenkov et al. 2014 → class Colponemea Cavalier-Smith 1993, emend. Tikhonenkov et al. 2014 → order Colponemida Cavalier-Smith 1993 → family Colponemidae Cavalier-Smith & Chao 2004, genus Colponema Stein 1878.
- Phylum Acavomonidia Tikhonenkov et al. 2014 → class Acavomonea Tikhonenkov et al. 2014 → order Acavomonadida Tikhonenkov et al. 2014 → family Acavomonadidae Tikhonenkov et al. 2014, genus Acavomonas Tikhonenkov et al. 2014.
- Order Palustrimonadida Cavalier-Smith 2018 → family Palustrimonadidae Cavalier-Smith 2018, genus Palustrimonas Patterson & Simpson 1996.

=== Myzozoa ===
==== ACS ====
- Colpodellida^{ICZN}/Colpodellales^{ICN} Cavalier-Smith 1993 emend. Adl et al. 2005, 2019. Incertae sedis genus: Piridium Patten 1936.
  - Vitrellaceae Oborník & Lukeš 2011. Sole genus: Vitrella Oborník & Lukeš 2011.
  - Colpodellaceae Adl et al. 2019. Genera: Colpodella Cienkowsky 1865; Chilovora Cavalier-Smith 2004; Voromonas Cavalier-Smith 2004.
  - Chromeraceae Oborník & Lukeš 2012. Sole genus: Chromera R.B.Moore et al. 2008.
  - Alphamonaceae/Alphamonadidae^{ICZN} Adl et al. 2019. Sole genus: Alphamonas Aléxéieff 1918.
- Apicomplexa Levine 1980, emend. Adl et al. 2005. Incertae sedis genera: Aggregata (Note: Highly divergent 18S rRNA. Since 2020 member of newly identified major apicomplexan subgroup Marosporida, putting together Aggregata octopiana Frenzel 1885, Merocystis kathae Dakin, 1911 (both Aggregatidae, originally coccidians), Rhytidocystis sp. 1 and Rhytidocystis sp. 2 Janouškovec et al. 2019 (Rhytidocystidae Levine, 1979, originally coccidians, Agamococcidiorida), and Margolisiella islandica Kristmundsson et al. 2011 (closely related to Rhytidocystidae)) Frenzel 1885, Christalloidophora Dehorne 1934, Dobellia Ikeda 1914, Echinococcidium Porchet 1978, Globidiellum Brumpt 1913, Joyeuxella Brasil 1902, Rhabdospora Laguesse 1906, Spermatobium Eisen 1895, Spiriopsis Arvy & Peters 1972, Spirogregarina Wood & Herman 1943, Toxocystis Léger & Duboscq 1910, Trophosphaera Le Calvez 1939.
  - Agamococcidiorida Levine 1979 (=Histogregarida Cavalier-Smith 2014)
    - Gemmocystidae Upton & Peters 1986. Sole genus: Gemmocystis.
    - Rhytidocystidae Levine 1979. Sole genus: Rhytidocystis.
  - Protococcidiorida Kheisin 1956 (=Coelotrophiida Vivier 1982). Angeiocystis, Coelotropha, Grellia, Eleutheroschizon, Mackinnonia, Myriosporides, Myriospora, Sawayella.
  - Aconoidasida^{(P)} Mehlhorn, Peters & Haberkorn 1980 (=Hematozoa Vivier 1982)
    - Haemospororida Danielewsky 1885. Dionisia, Haemocystidium, Haemoproteus, Hepatocystis, Leucocytozoon, Mesnilium, Nycteria, Parahaemoproteus, Plasmodium, Polychromophilus, Rayella, Saurocytozoon.
    - Piroplasmida Wenyon 1926. Anthemosoma, Babesia, Cytauxzoon, Echinozoon, Haemohormidium, Sauroplasma, Serpentoplasma, Theileria.
    - Nephromycida Cavalier-Smith 1993, emend. Adl et al. 2019. Nephromyces, Cardiosporidium.
  - Conoidasida^{(P)} Levine 1988
    - Corallicolida Kwong et al. 2021. Genera: Corallicola Kwong et al. 2021; Anthozoaphila Kwong et al. 2021; Gemmocystis Upton & Peters 1986.
    - Coccidia Leuckart 1879^{(P)}
      - Adeleorina Léger 1911. Adelea, Adelina, Babesiosima, Bartazoon, Chagasella, Cyrilia, Dactylosoma, Desseria, Ganapatiella, Gibbsia, Haemogregarina, Haemolivia, Hepatozoon, Ithania, Karyolysus, Klossia, Klossiella, Legerella, Orcheobius, Rasajeyna.
      - Eimeriorina Léger 1911. Atoxoplasma, Barrouxia, Besnoitia, Caryospora, Caryotropha, Choleoeimeria, Cyclospora, Cystoisospora, Defretinella, Diaspora, Dorisa, Dorisiella, Eimeria, Elleipsisoma, Goussia, Hammondia, Hyaloklossia, Isospora, Lankesterella, Mantonella, Merocystis, Neospora, Nephroisospora, Ovivora, Pfeifferinella, Pseudoklossia, Sarcocystis, Schellackia, Selenococcidium, Selysina, Spirocystis, Toxoplasma, Tyzzeria, Wenyonella.
    - Gregarinida Dufour 1828. Incertae sedis taxa: Digyalum Koura et al. 1990, Exoschizon Hukui 1939.
      - Archigregarinorida Grassé 1953^{(P)}. Meroselenidium, Merogregarina, Selenidium, Selenocystis, Veloxidium.
      - Eugregarinorida Léger 1900^{(P)}. Apolocystis, Amoebogregarina, Ancora, Ascogregarina, Asterophora, Blabericola, Caliculium, Cephaloidophora, Colepismatophila, Cystobia, Cystocephalus, Difficilina, Diplauxis, Enterocystis, Ganymedes, Geneiorhynchus, Gonospora, Gregarina, Heliospora, Hentschelia, Hirmocystis, Hoplorhynchus, Lankesteria, Lecudina, Leidyana, Lithocystis, Monocystella, Monocystis, Nematopsis, Nematocystis, Neoasterophora, Paralecudina, Paraschneideria, Phyllochaetopterus, Pileocephalus, Polyplicarium, Polyrhabdina, Porospora, Prismatospora, Protomagalhaensia, Psychodiella, Pterospora, Pyxinia, Pyxinioides, Rhabdocystis, Sphaerorhynchus, Steinina, Stenophora, Stylocephalus, Sycia, Syncystis, Thalicola, Thiriotia, Trichotokara, Uradiophora, Urospora, Xiphocephalus, Zygosoma, and more.
      - Neogregarinorida Grassé 1953. Apicystis, Aranciocystis, Caulleryella, Coelogregarina, Farinocystis, Gigaductus, Lipocystis, Lipotropha, Lymphotropha, Machadoella, Mattesia, Menzbieria, Ophryocystis, Schizocystis, Syncystis, Tipulocystis.
      - Cryptogregarinorida Cavalier-Smith 2014, emend. Adl et al. 2019. Cryptosporidium.
    - Blastogregarinea Chatton and Villeneuve 1936, emend. Simdyanov et al. 2018. Chattonaria, Siedleckia.
- Squirmida Cavalier-Smith 2014. Genus not assigned to any lower taxon: Digyalum.
  - Filipodiidae Cavalier-Smith 2014, genus Filipodium.
  - Platyproteidae Cavalier-Smith 2014, genus Platyproteum.

==== Dinozoa ====
- Perkinsea Levine 1978. Incertae sedis genera: Phagodinium Kristiansen 1993; Rastrimonas Brugerolle 2003; (Note: Apart from morphological descriptions, no molecular analysis has solidly affiliated Rastrimonas with the Perkinsozoa.) Acrocoelus Fernández, Pardos, Benito & Arroyo 1999.
  - Maranthos Alacid & Reñé 2021
  - Pararosariidae Jeon & Park 2021. Sole genus: Pararosarium Jeon & Park 2021.
  - Parviluciferaceae Reñé & Alacid 2017. Genera: Dinovorax Reñé & Alacid 2017; Parvilucifera Norén & Moestrup 1999; Snorkelia Reñé & Alacid 2017; Tuberlatum Jeon & Park 2019.
  - Perkinsidae Levine 1978. Sole genus: Perkinsus Levine 1978.
  - Xcellidae Freeman, Fuss, Kristmundsson, Keeling, Shalchian-Tabrizi & Bass 2017 em. Karlsbakk, Nystøyl, Plarre & Nylund 2021. Genera: Cryoxcellia Evans, Patel, Matzke & Millar 2023, Gadixcellia Freeman, Fuss, Kristmundsson, Keeling, Shalchian-Tabrizi & Bass 2017; Notoxcellia Desvignes et al. 2022; Salmoxcellia Karlsbakk, Nystøyl, Plarre & Nylund 2021; Xcellia Freeman, Fuss, Kristmundsson, Keeling, Shalchian-Tabrizi & Bass 2017.
- Dinoflagellata Bütschli 1885, emend. Fensome et al. 1993, emend. Adl et al. 2005. Incertae sedis genera: free-living (Adenoides, Akashiwo, Amphidiniella, Ankistrodinium, Apicoporus, Archaeosphaerodiniopsis, Bispinodinium, Bysmatrum, Cabra, Cladopyxis, Crypthecodinium, Cucumeridinium, Dactylodinium, Dicroerisma, Gloeodinium, Grammatodinium, Gynogonadinium, Gyrodiniellum, Halostylodinium, Heterodinium, Moestrupia, Paragymnodinium, Phytodinium, Plagiodinium, Planodinium, Pileidinium, Pseudadenoides, Pseudothecadinium, Pyramidodinium, Rhinodinium, Roscoffia, Sabulodinium, Sphaerodinium, Spiniferodinium, Testudodinium, Thecadinium, Thecadiniopsis, Togula) and parasitic Blastodiniales Chatton 1906 [no longer valid] (Amyloodinium, Apodinium, Cachonella, Caryotoma, Crepidoodinium, Haplozoon, Oodinium, Myxodinium, Piscinoodinium, Protoodinium, Rhinodinium, Schyzochitriodinium, Stylodinium).
  - Psammosa Okamoto, A. Horák & Keeling 2012
  - Oxyrrhinaceae Sournia 1984. Sole genus: Oxyrrhis Dujardin 1841.
  - Eleftheros Tikhonenkov, Hehenberger & Keeling 2023
  - Ichthyodinida Cavalier-Smith 2018 (environmental Marine Alveolate Group I)
    - Hobagellidae Yoo, Kim & Wayne Coats 2024. Sole genus: Hobagella Yoo, Kim & Wayne Coats 2024.
    - Euduboscquellidae Coats & Bachvaroff 2012. Euduboscquella D.W.Coats, T.R.Bachvaroff & C.F.Delwiche 2012; Dogelodinium Loeblich & A.R.Loeblich 1966 nom. cons.; Keppenodinium Loeblich & A.R.Loeblich 1966 nom. cons. (=Hollandella Cachon 1964).
    - Ichthyodiniidae Cavalier-Smith 2018. Sole genus: Ichthyodinium Hollande & Cachon 1952.
  - Ellobiopsidae Coutière 1911. Genera: Ellobiopsis Caullery 1910; Thalassomyces Niezabitowski 1913; Parallobiopsis B.Collin 1913; Ellobiocystis Coutière 1911; Rhizellobiopsis Hovasse 1926. (Note: The genera Parallobiopsis, Ellobiocystis and Rhizellobiopsis are only provisionally placed among ellobiopsids.)
  - Syndiniales A.R.Loeblich 1976
    - Amoebophryaceae^{ICN}/Amoebophryidae^{ICZN} Cachon 1964 (environmental Marine Alveolate Group II). Sole genus: Amoebophrya Koeppen 1892.
    - Syndiniaceae^{ICN}/Syndinidae^{ICZN} Chatton 1910 (environmental Marine Alveolate Group IV). Hematodinium, Syndinium, Solenodinium.
    - Sphaeriparaceae A.R.Loeblich 1970. Genera: Atlanticellodinium J.Cachon & M.Cachon-Enjumet 1965; Sphaeripara Poche 1911 nom. cons.
  - Noctilucales Haeckel 1894. Abedinium, Cachonodinium, Craspedotella, Cymbodinium, Kofoidinium, Leptodiscus, Noctiluca, Petalodinium, Pomatodinium, Scaphodinium, Spatulodinium.
  - Dinophyceae Pascher 1914
    - Gymnodiniphycidae Fensome et al. 1993
      - Gymnodiniales F. Stein 1878, emend. G. Hansen & Moestrup in Daugbjerg et al. 2000 sensu stricto. Barrufeta, Chytriodinium, Dissodinium, Erythropsidinium, Greuetodinium, Gymnodinium, Lepidodinium, Nematodinium, Nusuttodinium, Pellucidodinium, Polykrikos, Proterythropsis, Wangodinium, Warnowia.
      - Amphidinium Claparède & Lachmann 1859, emend. Flø Jørgensen et al. 2004 sensu stricto
      - Gyrodinium Kofoid & Swezy 1921, emend. G. Hansen & Moestrup in Daugbjerg et al. 2000 sensu stricto
      - Kareniaceae Bergholtz et al. 2005. Brachidinium, Karenia, Karlodinium, Takayama.
      - Ceratoperidiniaceae Loeblich III 1980, emend. Reñé & de Salas 2013. Ceratoperidinium, Kirithra.
      - Torodiniales Boutrup, Moestrup & Daugbjerg 2016. Kapelodinium, Torodinium.
      - Levanderina Moestrup et al. 2014
      - Margalefidinium F. Gómez, Richlen & D.M. Anderson 2017
      - Cochlodinium F. Schütt emend. F. Gómez, Richlen & D.M. Anderson 2017 sensu stricto
      - Ptychodiscales Fensome et al. 1993. Achradina, Amphilothus, Balechina, Ptychodiscus, Sclerodinium.
      - Borghiellaceae Moestrup, Lindberg, & Daugbjerg 2009. Baldinia, Borghiella.
      - Tovelliaceae Moestrup et al. 2005. Bernardinium, Esoptrodinium, Jadwigia, Tovellia.
      - Suessiaceae Fensome et al. 1993, emend. Moestrup et al. 2009. Ansanella, Asulcocephalium, Biecheleria, Biecheleriopsis, Leiocephalium, Pelagodinium, Polarella, Prosoaulax, Protodinium, Symbiodinium, Yihiella.
    - Peridiniphycidae Fensome et al. 1993
      - Gonyaulacales Taylor 1980. Alexandrium, Amylax, Ceratium, Ceratocorys, Coolia, Fukuyoa, Fragilidium, Gambierdiscus, Goniodoma, Gonyaulax, Lingulodinium, Ostreopsis, Pentaplacodinium, Peridiniella, Protoceratium, Pyrocystis, Pyrodinium, Pyrophacus, Tripos.
      - Peridiniales Haeckel 1894. Amphidiniopsis, Archaeperidinium, Blastodinium, Diplopelta, Diplopsalis, Diplopsalopsis, Herdmania, Niea, Oblea, Palatinus, Parvodinium, Peridinium, Peridiniopsis, Preperidinium, Protoperidinium, Qia, Vulcanodinium.
      - Thoracosphaeraceae Schiller 1930. Aduncodinium, Amyloodinium, Apocalathium, Blastodinium, Chimonodinium, Cryptoperidiniopsis, Duboscquodinium, Ensiculifera, Laciniporus, Leonella, Luciella, Naiadinium, Paulsenella, Pentapharsodinium, Pfiesteria, Scrippsiella, Stoeckeria, Theleodinium, Thoracosphaera, Tintinnophagus, Tyrannodinium.
      - Podolampadaceae Lindemann 1928. Blepharocysta, Gaarderiella, Heterobractum, Lissodinium, Mysticella, Podolampas.
      - Kryptoperidiniaceae Lindemann 1925 ["dinotoms"]. Blixaea, Durinskia, Galeidinium, Kryptoperidinium, Unruhdinium, etc.
      - Heterocapsaceae Fensome et al. 1993. Heterocapsa.
      - Amphidomataceae Sournia 1984. Amphidoma, Azadinium.
      - Oxytoxaceae Lindemann 1928. Corythodinium, Oxytoxum.
      - Centrodiniaceae Hernández-Becerril 2010. Centrodinium.
    - Dinophysales Kofoid 1926. Amphisolenia, Citharistes, Dinofurcula, Dinophysis, Histioneis, Latifascia, Metadinophysis, Metaphalacroma, Ornithocercus, Oxyphysis, Parahistioneis, Phalacroma, Pseudophalacroma, Sinophysis, Triposolenia.
    - Prorocentrales Lemmermann 1910. Mesoporus, Prorocentrum.

=== Ciliophora ===
- Postciliodesmatophora Gerassimova & Seravin 1976
  - Karyorelictea Corliss 1974
    - Kentrophoridae Jankowski 1980. Kentrophoros.
    - Loxodida Jankowski 1980
      - Cryptopharyngidae Jankowski 1980. Cryptopharynx.
      - Loxodidae Bütschli 1889. Loxodes.
    - Geleiidae Kahl 1933. Geleia.
  - Heterotrichea Stein 1859
    - Blepharismidae Jankowski in Small & Lynn 1985. Blepharisma
    - Climacostomidae Repak 1972. Climacostomum.
    - Condylostomatidae Kahl in Doflein & Reichenow 1929. Chattonidium, Condylostoma.
    - Fabreidae Shazib et al. 2014. Fabrea.
    - Gruberiidae Shazib et al. 2014. Gruberia.
    - Coliphorina Jankowski 1967
      - Folliculinidae Dons 1914. Folliculina.
      - Maristentoridae Miao et al. 2005. Maristentor.
    - Peritromidae Stein 1867. Peritromus.
    - Spirostomidae Stein 1867. Anigsteinia, Spirostomum.
    - Stentoridae Carus 1863. Stentor.
- Intramacronucleata Lynn 1996. Incertae sedis taxa: Protocruziidae Jankowski 1980 [Protocruziidia de Puytorac et al. 1987] (Protocruzia Faria da Cunha & Pinto 1922).
  - SAL Gentekaki et al. 2014. Incertae sedis taxa: Cariacotrichea Orsi et al. 2011 (Cariacothrix caudata), Mesodiniidae ankowski, 1980 (Mesodinium), Phacodiniidia Small and Lynn 1985 (Phacodinium).
    - Spirotrichea Bütschli 1889
      - Euplotia Jankowski 1979
        - Euplotida Small & Lynn 1985
          - Aspidiscidae Ehrenberg 1830. Aspidisca.
          - Certesiidae Borror & Hill 1995. Certesia.
          - Euplotidae Ehrenberg 1838. Euplotes.
          - Gastrocirrhidae Fauré-Fremiet 1961. Gastrocirrhus.
          - Uronychidae Jankowski 1975. Diophrys, Uronychia.
        - Discocephalida
          - Discocephalidae Jankowski 1979. Discocephalus, Prodiscocephalus, Paradiscocephalus.
          - Pseudoamphisiellidae Song et al. 1997. Leptoamphisiella, Pseudoamphisiella.
      - Perilemmaphora Berger 2008
        - Hypotrichia Stein 1859
          - Stichotrichida Fauré-Fremiet 1961^{(P)} (Note: This taxon is artificial; many of the families listed in it are not monophyletic and have little support from phylogenetic analyses.)
            - Amphisiellidae Jankowski 1979. Amphisiella, Bistichella.
            - Atractosidae Bourland 2015. Atractos.
            - Epiclintidae Wicklow & Borror 1990. Epiclintes.
            - Gonostomatidae Small & Lynn 1985. Cotterillia, Gonostomum.
            - Halteriidae Claparède & Lachmann 1858. Halteria, Meseres.
            - Holostichidae Fauré-Fremiet 1961. Holosticha, Uncinata.
            - Kahliellidae Tuffrau 1979. Deviata, Kahliella.
            - Keronidae Dujardin 1840. Kerona.
            - Oxytrichidae Ehrenberg 1830^{(P)}. Cyrtohymena, Gastrostyla, Oxytricha, Stylonychia.
            - Parabirojimidae Dai & Xu 2011. Parabirojimia, Tunicothrix.
            - Plagiotomidae Bütschli 1887. Plagiotoma.
            - Psammomitridae Jankowski 1979. Psammomitra.
            - Pseudoamphisiellidae Song et al. 1996. Pseudoamphisiella.
            - Psilotrichidae Bütschli 1889. Psilotricha, Urospinula.
            - Schmidingerotrichidae Foissner 2012. Schmidingerothrix.
            - Spirofilidae von Gelei 1929. Spirofilopsis, Strongylidium.
            - Trachelostylidae Small & Lynn 1985. Trachelostyla.
            - Uroleptidae Foissner & Stoeck 2008. Paruroleptus, Uroleptus.
          - Urostylida Jankowski 1979^{(P)}
            - Bergeriellidae Liu et al. 2010. Bergeriella, Neourostylopsis.
            - Hemicycliostylidae Lyu et al. 2018. Australothrix, Hemicycliostyla.
            - Pseudokeronopsidae Borror & Wicklow, 1983. Apoholosticha, Pseudokeronopsis.
            - Pseudourostylidae Jankowski 1979. Pseudourostyla.
            - Urostylidae Bütschli 1889. Bakuella, Diaxonella, Urostyla.
        - Oligotrichea Bütschli 1887
          - Oligotrichida Bütschli 1887
            - Cyrtostrombidiidae Agatha 2004. Cyrtostrombidium.
            - Pelagostrombidiidae Agatha 2004. Pelagostrombidium.
            - Strombidiidae Fauré-Fremiet 1970. Strombidium^{(P)}.
            - Tontoniidae Agatha 2004. Laboea, Tontonia.
          - Choreotrichida Small & Lynn 1985. Incertae sedis taxa: Lynnella Liu et al. 2011 [Lynnellidae Liu et al. 2011; Lynnellida Liu et al. 2015]
            - Strobilidiina Jankowski 1980^{(P)}
              - Leegaardiellidae Lynn & Montagnes 1988. Leegaardiella.
              - Lohmanniellidae Montagnes & Lynn 1991. Lohmanniella.
              - Strobilidiidae Kahl in Doflein & Reichenow 1929. Strobilidium.
              - Strombidinopsidae Small & Lynn 1985. Strombidinopsis^{(P)}.
            - Tintinnina Kofoid & Campbell 1929. Incertae sedis taxa: Helicostomella, Tintinnopsis^{(P)}, several other genera.
              - Ascampbelliellidae Corliss 1960. Ascampbelliella
              - Cyttarocylididae Kofoid & Campbell 1929 [probably synonymous with Petalotrichidae]. Cyttarocylis.
              - Dictyocystidae Haeckel 1873. Dictyocysta.
              - Epiplocylididae Kofoid & Campbell 1939. Epiplocylis.
              - Eutintinnidae Bachy et al. 2012. Dartintinnus, Eutintinnus.
              - Favellidae Kofoid & Campbell 1929. Favella.
              - Nolaclusiliidae Sniezek et al. 1991. Nolaclusilis.
              - Petalotrichidae Kofoid & Campbell 1929 [probably synonymous with Cyttarocylididae]. Petalotricha.
              - Ptychocylididae Kofoid & Campbell 1929. Cymatocylis, Ptychocylis.
              - Rhabdonellidae Kofoid & Campbell 1929. Metacylis, Rhabdonella, Schmidingerella.
              - Stenosemellidae Campbell 1954^{(P)}. Stenosemella.
              - Tintinnidae Claparède & Lachmann 1858. Amphorellopsis, Salpingacantha, Salpingella, Tintinnus.
              - Tintinnidiidae Kofoid & Campbell 1929. Tintinnidium.
              - Undellidae Kofoid & Campbell 1929. Undella.
              - Xystonellidae Kofoid & Campbell 1929. Dadayiella, Parafavella, Xystonella.
      - Licnophoridae Bütschli 1887. Licnophora, Prolicnophora.
      - Kiitrichidae Nozawa 1941. Caryotricha, Kiitricha.
    - Lamellicorticata Vd'ačný et al. 2010
      - Armophorea Lynn 2004. Incertae sedis taxa: Mylestomatidae Kahl in Doflein & Reichenow, 1929 (Mylestoma).
        - Metopida Jankowski 1980^{(P)}
          - Metopidae Kahl 1927^{(P)}. Bothrostoma, Brachonella, Eometopus, Metopus, Parametopidium, Tesnospira.
          - Apometopidae Foissner 2016. Cirranter, Urostomides.
          - Tropidoatractidae Rotterová et al. 2018. Palmarella, Tropidoatractus.
        - Clevelandellida de Puytorac & Grain 1976
          - Clevelandellidae Kidder 1938. Clevelandella.
          - Inferostomatidae Ky 1971. Inferostoma.
          - Neonyctotheridae Affa'a 1987. Neonyctotherus.
          - Nyctotheridae Amaro 1972^{(P)}. Nyctotherus.
          - Sicuophoridae Amaro 1972. Sicuophora.
        - Caenomorphidae Poche 1913. Caenomorpha, Ludio, Sulfonecta.
        - Odontostomatida Sawaya 1940
          - Discomorphellidae Corliss 1960. Discomorphella.
          - Epalxellidae Corliss 1960. Epalxella, Saprodinium.
      - Litostomatea Small & Lynn 1981
        - Rhynchostomatia Jankowski 1980
          - Dileptida Jankowski 1978
            - Dileptidae Jankowski 1980. Apodileptus, Dileptus, Pseudomonilicaryon.
            - Dimacrocaryonidae Jankowski 1978. Dimacrocaryon, Monomacrocaryon, Rimaleptus.
            - Tracheliidae Ehrenberg 1838. Trachelius.
        - Haptoria Corliss 1974^{(P)}. Incertae sedis taxa: Chaenea.
          - Lacrymariidae de Fromentel 1876. Lacrymaria.
          - Haptorida Corliss 1974
            - Enchelyodonidae Foissner et al. 2002. Enchelyodon, Fuscheria.
            - Homalozoonidae Jankowski 1980. Homalozoon.
            - Pleuroplitidae Foissner 1996. Pleuroplites.
          - Didiniidae Poche 1913. Didinium, Monodinium.
          - Pleurostomatida Schewiakoff 1896
            - Amphileptidae Bütschli 1889. Amphileptus.
            - Litonotidae Kent 1882. Litonotus.
            - Kentrophyllidae Wu et al. 2015. Epiphyllum, Kentrophyllum.
          - Spathidiida Foissner & Foissner 1988
            - Acropisthiidae Foissner & Foissner 1988. Acropisthium, Chaenea.
            - Actinobolinidae Kahl 1930. Actinobolina.
            - Apertospathulidae Foissner et al. 2005. Apertospathula.
            - Enchelyidae Ehrenberg 1838. Enchelys.
            - Pseudoholophryidae Berger et al. 1984. Pseudoholophrya.
            - Spathidiidae Kahl in Doflein & Reichenow 1929. Legendrea, Spathidium.
            - Trachelophyllidae Kent 1882. Trachelophyllum.
          - Helicoprorodontidae Small & Lynn 1985
        - Trichostomatia Bütschli 1889
          - Vestibuliferida de Puytorac et al. 1974
            - Balantidiidae Reichenow in Doflein and Reichenow 1929. Balantidium, Neobalantidium^{(P)}.
            - Buetschliidae Poche 1913. Buetschlia.
            - Paraisotrichidae da Cunha 1917. Paraisotrichia.
            - Protocaviellidae Grain in Corliss 1979. Protocaviella.
            - Protohalliidae da Cunha & Muniz 1927. Protohallia.
            - Pycnotrichidae Poche 1913. Pycnothrix, perhaps Buxtonella.
        - Isoendo
          - Isotrichidae Bütschli 1889. Dasytricha, Isotricha.
          - Entodiniomorphida Reichenow in Doflein & Reichenow 1929
            - Blepharocorythina Wolska 1971
              - Blepharocorythidae Hsiung 1929. Blepharocorys.
              - Parentodiniidae Ito, Miyazaki & Imai 2002. Parentodinium.
              - Pseudoentodiniidae Wolska 1986. Pseudoentodinium.
            - Entodiniomorphina Reichenow in Doflein & Reichenow 1929
              - Cycloposthiidae Poche 1913. Cycloposthium.
              - Gilchristinidae Ito, Ishihara & Imai 2014 [Gilchristidae Ito et al. 2006]. Digilchristia, Gilchristina.
              - Ophryoscolecidae Stein 1859. Entodinium, Ophryoscolex, Polyplastron.
              - Polydiniellidae Corliss 1960. Polydiniella.
              - Rhinozetidae Van Hoven, Gilchrist & Hamilton-Attwell 1988. Rhinozeta.
              - Spirodiniidae Strelkow 1939. Spirodinium.
              - Telamodiniidae Latteur & Dufey 1967. Telamodinium.
              - Troglodytellidae Corliss 1979. Troglodytella,.
          - Macropodiniida Lynn 2008
            - Amylovoracidae Cameron & O'Donoghue 2002. Amylovorax.
            - Macropodiniidae Dehority 1996. Macropodinium.
            - Polycostidae Cameron & O'Donoghue 2003. Polycosta.
  - CONTHREEP Lynn in Adl et al. 2012 [Ventrata Cavalier-Smith 2004]. Incertae sedis taxa: Askenasia Blochmann 1895, Cyclotrichiidae Jankowski 1980 (Cyclotrichium), Paraspathidium Noland 1937, Pseudotrachelocercidae Song 1990 (Pseudotrachelocerca), Discotrichidae Jankowski 1967 [Discotrichida Fan et al. 2014] (Discotricha, Lopezoterenia).
    - Phyllopharyngea de Puytorac et al. 1974
      - Synhymeniida de Puytorac et al. in Deroux 1978
        - Nassulopsidae Deroux in Corliss 1979. Nassulopsis.
        - Orthodonellidae Jankowski 1968. Orthodonella, Zosterodasys.
        - Scaphidiodontidae Deroux in Corliss 1979. Chilodontopsis, Scaphidiodon.
        - Synhymeniidae Jankowski in Small & Lynn 1985. Synhymenia.
      - Subkinetalia Gong et al. 2009
        - Cyrtophoria Fauré-Fremiet in Corliss 1956
          - Chlamydodontida Deroux 1976^{(P)}
            - Chilodonellidae Deroux 1970. Chilodonella.
            - Chitonellidae Small & Lynn 1985. Chitonella.
            - Chlamydodontidae Stein 1859. Chlamydodon.
            - Gastronautidae Deroux 1994. Gastronauta.
            - Kryoprorodontidae Alekperov & Mamajeva 1992. Gymnozoum.
            - Lynchellidae Jankowski 1968. Chlamydonella, Lynchella.
          - Dysteriida Deroux 1976
            - Dysteriidae Claparède & Lachmann 1858. Dysteria^{(P)}, Trochilia.
            - Hartmannulidae Poche 1913^{(P)}. Hartmannula.
            - Kyaroikeidae Sniezek & Coats 1996. Kyaroikeus.
            - Plesiotrichopidae Deroux 1976. Plesiotrichopus.
            - Chonotrichia Wallengren 1895
              - Exogemmida Jankowski 1972
                - Chilodochonidae Wallengren 1895. Chilodochona.
                - Filichonidae Jankowski 1973. Filichona.
                - Helichonidae Jankowski 1972. Heliochona.
                - Lobochonidae Jankowski 1967. Lobochona.
                - Phyllochonidae Jankowski 1972. Phyllochona.
                - Spirochonidae Stein 1854. Spirochona.
              - Cryptogemmida Jankowski 1975
                - Actinichonidae Jankowski 1973. Actinichona.
                - Echinichonidae Jankowski 1973. Echinichona.
                - Inversochonidae Jankowski 1973. Inversochona.
                - Isochonidae Jankowski 1973. Isochona.
                - Isochonopsidae Batisse & Crumeyrolle 1988. Isochonopsis.
                - Stylochonidae Mohr 1948. Stylochona.
        - Rhynchodia Chatton & Lwoff 1939
          - Hypocomidae Bütschli 1889. Hypocoma.
          - Rhynchodida Chatton & Lwoff 1939
            - Ancistrocomidae Chatton & Lwoff 1939. Ancistrocoma.
            - Sphenophryidae Chatton & Lwoff 1921. Sphenophrya.
        - Suctoria Claparède & Lachmann 1858
          - Exogenida Collin 1912
            - Allantosomatidae Jankowski 1967. Allantosoma.
            - Dentacinetidae Batisse 1992. Dentacineta.
            - Dendrosomididae Jankowski 1978. Dendrosomides.
            - Ephelotidae Kent 1882. Ephelota.
            - Lecanophryidae Jankowski 1973. Lecanophrya.
            - Manuelophryidae Dovgal 2002. Manuelophrya.
            - Metacinetidae Bütschli 1889. Metacineta.
            - Ophryodendridae Stein 1867. Ophryodendron.
            - Paracinetidae Jankowski 1978. Paracineta.
            - Phalacrocleptidae Kozloff 1966. Phalacrocleptes.
            - Podophryidae Haeckel 1866. Podophrya.
            - Praethecacinetidae Dovgal 1996. Praethecacineta.
            - Rhabdophryidae Jankowski 1970. Rhabdophrya.
            - Severonidae Jankowski 1981. Severonis.
            - Spelaeophryidae Jankowski in Batisse 1975. Spelaeophrya.
            - Tachyblastonidae Grell 1950. Tachyblaston.
            - Thecacinetidae Matthes 1956. Thecacineta.
          - Endogenida Collin 1912
            - Acinetidae Stein 1859. Acineta.
            - Acinetopsidae Jankowski 1978. Acinetopsis.
            - Choanophryidae Dovgal 2002. Choanophrya.
            - Corynophryidae Jankowski 1981. Corynophrya.
            - Dactylostomatidae Jankowski 1978. Dactylostoma.
            - Dendrosomatidae Fraipont 1878. Dendrosoma.
            - Endosphaeridae Jankowski in Corliss 1979. Endosphaera.
            - Erastophryidae Jankowski 1978. Erastophrya.
            - Pseudogemmidae Jankowski 1978. Pseudogemma.
            - Rhynchetidae Jankowski 1978. Rhyncheta.
            - Solenophryidae Jankowski 1981. Solenophrya.
            - Tokophryidae Jankowski in Small & Lynn 1985. Tokophrya.
            - Trichophryidae Fraipont 1878. Trichophrya.
          - Evaginogenida Jankowski in Corliss 1979
            - Cometodendridae Jankowski 1978. Cometodendron.
            - Cyathodiniidae da Cuhna 1914. Cyathodinium.
            - Dendrocometidae Haeckel 1866. Dendrocometes.
            - Discophryidae Collin 1912. Discophrya.
            - Enchelyomorphidae Augustin & Foissner 1992. Enchelyomorpha.
            - Heliophryidae Corliss 1979. Heliophrya.
            - Periacinetidae Jankowski 1978. Periacineta.
            - Prodiscophryidae Jankowski 1978. Prodiscophrya.
            - Rhynchophryidae Jankowski 1978. Rhynchophrya.
            - Stylocometidae Jankowski 1978. Stylocometes.
            - Trypanococcidae Dovgal 2002. Trypanococcus.
    - Colpodea Small & Lynn 1981
      - Bursariomorphida Fernández-Galiano 1978
        - Bryometopidae Jankowski 1980. Bryometopus(P), Thylakidium.
        - Bursaridiidae Foissner 1993. Bursaridium, Paracondylostoma.
        - Bursariidae Bory de St. Vincent 1826. Bursaria.
      - Colpodida de Puytorac et al. 1974. Incertae sedis taxa: Bardeliellidae Foissner 1984 (Bardeliella), Hausmanniellidae Foissner 1987 (Avestina, Hausmanniella), Ilsiellidae Bourland et al. 2011 (Ilsiella), Pseudochlamydonellidae Buitkamp et al. 1989 (Hackenbergia, Pseudochlamydonella) and Marynidae Poche 1913 (Maryna).
        - Bryophryina de Puytorac et al. 1979
          - Bryophryidae de Puytorac et al. 1979. Bryophrya.
          - Sandmanniellidae Foissner & Stoeck 2009. Sandmanniella.
        - Colpodina Foissner et al. 2011
          - Colpodidae Bory de St. Vincent 1826^{(P)}. Colpoda.
          - Grandoriidae Corliss 1960. Grandoria.
          - Tillinidae Foissner et al. 2011. Tillina.
        - Grossglockneriidae Foissner 1980 [Grossglockneriina Foissner 1980]. Grossglockneria, Pseudoplatyophrya.
      - Cyrtolophosidida Foissner 1978
        - Cyrtolophosididae Stokes 1888. Cyrtolophosis.
        - Kreyellidae Foissner 1979. Kreyella.
      - Platyophryida de Puytorac et al. 1979
        - Ottowphryidae Foissner et al. 2011. Ottowphrya, Platyophryides.
        - Platyophryidae de Puytorac et al. 1979^{(P)}. Platyophrya.
        - Sagittariidae Grandori & Grandori 1935. Sagittaria.
        - Sorogenidae Bradbury & Olive 1980. Sorogena.
        - Woodruffiidae Gelei 1954. Etoschophrya, Rostrophrya, Woodruffia.
    - Nassophorea^{(P)}
      - Colpodidiidae Foissner 1995. Colpodidium.
      - Nassulida Jankowski 1967
        - Furgasoniidae Corliss 1979. Furgasonia, Wolfkosia.
        - Nassulidae de Fromentel 1874. Nassula, Obertrumia.
      - Microthoracida Jankowski 1967
        - Microthoracidae Wrzesniowski 1870. Drepanomonas, Microthorax.
        - Leptopharyngidae Kahl 1926. Leptopharynx, Pseudomicrothorax.
    - Prostomatea Schewiakoff 1896^{(P)}
      - Apsiktratidae Foissner et al. 1994 [Prostomatida Schewiakoff 1896]
        - Balanionidae Small & Lynn 1985. Balanion.
        - Cryptocaryonidae Wright & Colorni 2002. Cryptocaryon.
        - Colepidae Ehrenberg 1838. Coleps, Plagiopogon.
        - Holophryidae Perty 1852. Holophrya.
        - Lagynidae Sola et al. 1990. Lagynus.
        - Metacystidae Kahl 1926. Metacystis, Vasicola.
        - Placidae Small & Lynn 1985. Placus.
        - Plagiocampidae Kahl 1926. Plagiocampa.
        - Prorodontidae Kent 1881. Prorodon.
        - Urotrichidae Small & Lynn 1985. Urotricha.
    - Plagiopylea Small & Lynn 1985
      - Plagiopylida Small & Lynn 1985
        - Epalxellidae Corliss 1960. Epalxella, Saprodinium.
        - Plagiopylidae Schewiakoff 1896. Plagiopyla.
        - Sonderiidae Small & Lynn 1985. Sonderia.
        - Trimyemidae Kahl 1933. Trimyema.
    - Oligohymenophorea de Puytorac et al. 1974
      - Apostomatia Chatton & Lwoff 1928
        - Apostomatida Chatton & Lwoff 1928
          - Colliniidae Cépède 1910. Collinia, Metacollinia.
          - Cyrtocaryidae Corliss 1979. Cyrtocaryum.
          - Foettingeriidae Chatton 1911. Foettingeria.
          - Pseudocolliniidae Chantangsi et al. 2013. Fusiforma, Pseudocollinia.
        - Astomatophorida Jankowski 1966
          - Opalinopsidae Hartog 1906. Opalinopsis.
        - Pilisuctorida Jankowski 1966
          - Conidophryidae Kirby 1941. Conidophrys.
      - Astomatia Schewiakoff 1896
        - Anoplophryidae Cépède 1910. Anoplophrya.
        - Buetschliellidae de Puytorac in Corliss 1979. Buetschliella.
        - Clausilocolidae de Puytorac in Corliss 1979. Clausilocola.
        - Contophryidae de Puytorac 1972. Contophyra.
        - Haptophryidae Cépède 1923. Haptophrya.
        - Hoplitophryidae Cheissin 1930. Hoplitophrya.
        - Intoshellinidae Cépède 1910. Intoshellina.
        - Maupasellidae Cépède 1910. Maupasella.
        - Radiophryidae de Puytorac 1972. Radiophrya.
      - Hymenostomatia Delage & Hérouard 1896
        - Tetrahymenida Fauré-Fremiet in Corliss 1956. Incertae sedis taxa: Trichospiridae Kahl 1926 (Trichospira).
          - Curimostomatidae Jankowski 1968. Curimostoma.
          - Glaucomidae Corliss 1971. Glaucoma.
          - Spirozonidae Kahl 1926. Spirozona.
          - Tetrahymenidae Corliss 1952. Tetrahymena.
          - Turaniellidae Didier 1971. Colpidium, Dexiostoma, Turaniella.
        - Ophryoglenida Canella 1964
          - Ichthyophthiriidae Kent 1881. Ichthyophthirius.
          - Ophryoglenidae Kent 1881. Ophryoglena.
      - Peniculia Fauré-Fremiet in Corliss 1956^{(P)}
        - Peniculida Fauré-Fremiet in Corliss 1956
          - Clathrostomatidae Kahl 1926. Clathrostoma.
          - Frontoniidae Kahl 1926. Disematostoma, Frontonia^{(P)}.
          - Lembadionidae Jankowski in Corliss 1979. Lembadion.
          - Maritujidae Jankowski in Small & Lynn 1985. Marituja.
          - Neobursaridiidae Dragesco & Tuffrau 1967. Neobursaridium.
          - Parameciidae Dujardin 1840. Paramecium.
          - Paranassulidae Fauré-Fremiet 1962. Paranassula.
          - Stokesiidae Roque 1961. Stokesia.
          - Urocentridae Claparède & Lachmann 1858 [Urocentrida de Puytorac, Grain & Mignot 1987]
      - Peritrichia Stein 1859
        - Sessilida Kahl 1933
          - Astylozoidae Kahl 1935. Astylozoon, Hastatella.
          - Ellobiophryidae Chatton and Lwoff 1929. Ellobiophrya.
          - Epistylididae Kahl 1933. Epistylis.
          - Lagenophryidae Bütschli 1889. Lagenophrys.
          - Operculariidae Fauré-Fremiet in Corliss 1979. Opercularia.
          - Rovinjellidae Matthes 1972. Rovinjella.
          - Scyphidiidae Kahl 1933^{(P)}. Scyphidia.
          - Termitophryidae Lom in Corliss 1979. Termitophrya.
          - Usconophryidae Clamp 1991. Usconophrys.
          - Vaginicolidae de Fromentel 1874. Cothurnia, Pyxicola, Thuricola, Vaginicola.
          - Vorticellidae Ehrenberg 1838. Carchesium, Epicarchesium^{(P)}, Ophrydium, Pelagovorticella, Pseudovorticella^{(P)}, Vorticella^{(P)}.
          - Zoothamniidae Sommer 1951. Haplocaulus, Zoothamnium.
        - Mobilida Kahl 1933
          - Polycyclidae Poljansky 1951. Polycycla.
          - Trichodinidae Claus 1874. Trichodina.
          - Trichodinopsidae Kent 1881. Trichodinopsis.
          - Urceolariidae Dujardin 1840. Leiotrocha, Urceolaria.
      - Scuticociliatia Small 1967^{(P)}
        - Philasterida Small 1967
          - Cohnilembidae Kahl 1933. Cohnilembus.
          - Cryptochilidae Berger in Corliss 1979. Cryptochilum.
          - Entodiscidae Jankowski 1973. Entodiscus.
          - Entorhipidiidae Madsen 1931. Entorhipidium.
          - Orchitophryidae Cépède 1910^{(P)}. Orchitophrya.
          - Paralembidae Corliss & de Puytorac in Small & Lynn 1985. Anophrys, Paralembus.
          - Parauronematidae Small & Lynn 1985^{(P)}. Parauronema^{(P)}.
          - Philasteridae Kahl 1931. Kahlilembus, Philaster.
          - Pseudocohnilembidae Evans & Thompson 1964. Pseudocohnilembus.
          - Schizocaryidae Jankowski 1979. Schizocaryum.
          - Thigmophryidae Chatton & Lwoff 1926. Thigmophrya.
          - Thyrophylacidae Berger in Corliss 1961. Thyrophylax.
          - Uronematidae Thompson 1964. Uronema.
          - Urozonidae Grolière 1975. Urozona.
        - Pleuronematida Fauré-Fremiet in Corliss 1956
          - Calyptotrichidae Small & Lynn 1985. Calyptotricha.
          - Conchophthiridae Kahl in Doflein and Reichenow 1929. Conchophthirus.
          - Ctedoctematidae Small & Lynn 1985. Ctedoctema.
          - Cyclidiidae Ehrenberg 1838^{(P)}. Cristigera, Cyclidium.
          - Dragescoidae Jankowski 1980. Dragescoa.
          - Eurystomatellidae Miao et al. 2010. Eurystomatella.
          - Histiobalantiidae de Puytorac & Corliss in Corliss 1979. Histiobalantium.
          - Peniculistomatidae Fenchel 1965. Peniculistoma.
          - Pleuronematidae Kent 1881^{(P)}. Pleuronema.
          - Thigmocomidae Kazubski 1958. Thigmocoma.
        - Thigmotrichida Chatton & Lwoff 1922
          - Ancistridae Issel 1903. Ancistrum.
          - Hemispeiridae König 1894. Hemispeira.
          - Hysterocinetidae Diesing 1866. Hysterocineta.
          - Paraptychostomidae Ngassam et al. 1994. Paraptychostomum.
        - Loxocephalida Jankowski 1964^{(P)}
          - Cinetochilidae Perty 1852^{(P)}. Cinetochilum, Sathrophilus.
          - Loxocephalidae Jankowski 1964. Cardiostomatella, Dexiotricha, Loxocephalus.

== Rhizaria ==
- Incertae sedis taxa: Gymnosphaerida Poche 1913, emend. Mikrjukov 2000. Actinocoryne, Cienkowskya, Gymnosphaera, Hedraiophrys [possible synonym of Cienkowskya], Wagnerella.

- - Cercozoa
    - Filosa
    - - Endomyxa
      - Skiomonadea
  - Retaria
    - Foraminifera
    - Radiolaria

Cladogram of Rhizaria based on a 2019 phylogenomic analysis.

Rhizaria is a clade that contains a wide variety of primarily amoeboid protists with fine (filose) pseudopodia. It is generally divided into two phyla: Cercozoa, which is composed of a heterogeneous mixture of free-living flagellates, testate amoebae, obligate intracellular parasites, and photosynthetic amoebae, among others; and Retaria, which includes the radiolarians and forams, two groups that have a rich and continuous fossil record over 500 million years long. Discovered only through molecular phylogenetics, Rhizaria is home to over 11,000 described species.

=== Cercozoa ===
- - Filosa
    - - - Monadofilosa
          - - - - - Thecofilosea
                  - - Thaumatomonadida
                    - Discomonas
                - - Metromonadea
                  - Marimonadida
              - - - - - Glissomonadida
                      - Pansomonadida
                    - Variglissida
                  - Cercomonadida
                - Euglyphia
            - Sainouroidea
          - Paracercomonadidae
        - Granofilosea
      - Chlorarachnea
- - Endomyxa
    - Marimyxia
      - - Ascetosporea
        - Gromia
      - Filoreta
    - Phytorhiza
      - Vampyrellida
      - Phytomyxea
  - Skiomonadea

Cladogram of Cercozoa based on a 2026 phylogenomic analysis.

Cercozoa is a phylum of protists with extreme morphological diversity, ranging from small flagellates and amoeboflagellates, to testate amoebae, heliozoan- and radiolarian-like amoebae, and massive biomineralizing predators, as well as a few photosynthetic species. They are present abundantly in aquatic habitats and soils. Cercozoa contains two subphyla: Filosa, represented primarily by free-living lineages, and Endomyxa, which includes obligate intracellular parasites and free-living predators. (Note: Whether Endomyxa is part of Cercozoa or not has been difficult to assess due to poor taxon sampling, but the most recent phylogenomic analyses support the inclusion of Endomyxa within Cercozoa.) Included in or related to Endomyxa are several clades known primarily from environmental sequences ('novel clades' 10, 11, 12), with only a few members formally described.

The classification below is based largely on the 2019 revision by Adl et al. and Cavalier-Smith et al. Adl et al. excludes Endomyxa and Skiomonadea from Cercozoa, but later works generally include them.

Phylum Cercozoa Cavalier-Smith 1998, emend. Adl et al. 2005. Incertae sedis genera: Bereczkya, Dictiomyxa, Myxodictyium, Pontomyxa, Protomyxa, Protogenes, Rhizoplasma.

- Order Tremulida Cavalier-Smith & Howe in Howe et al. 2011, family Tremulidae Cavalier-Smith in Cavalier-Smith, Chao & Lewis 2018, genus Tremula.
- Order Aquavolonida Bass & Berney in Bass et al. 2018, genera Aquavolon, Lapot.
- Subphylum Filosa Cavalier-Smith in Cavalier-Smith & Chao 2003
  - Incertae sedis:
    - Order Pseudosporida Cavalier-Smith 1993, family Pseudosporidae Berlese in Saccardo 1888, genus Pseudospora.
  - Class Granofilosea Cavalier-Smith & Bass in Bass et al. 2009
    - Incertae sedis:
      - Genera: Apogromia, Kibisidytes, Microcometes, Microgromia and probably Ditrema and Paralieberkuehnia.
      - Species: "Exuviaella" pusilla
    - Order Limnofilida Cavalier-Smith & Bass in Bass et al. 2009, family Limnofilidae Cavalier-Smith & Bass in Bass et al. 2009, genus Limnofila.
    - Order Cryptofilida^{(P)} Cavalier-Smith & Bass in Bass et al. 2009
      - Family Mesofilidae Cavalier-Smith & Bass in Bass et al. 2009, genus Mesofila.
      - Family Nanofilidae Cavalier-Smith & Bass in Bass et al. 2009, genus Nanofila.
    - Order Leucodictyida Cavalier-Smith 1993, emend. 2003, emend. 2009
      - Family Leucodictyidae Cavalier-Smith 1993, genera Leucodictyon, Reticulamoeba.
      - Family Massisteriidae Cavalier-Smith 1993, genera Massisteria, Minimassisteria. (Note: The family Massisteriidae was originally placed in the order Leucodictyida, along with the family Leucodictyidae which included two genera Leucodictyon and Reticulamoeba. However, Leucodictyon has not been genetically sequenced and Reticulamoeba is not closely related to Massisteriidae.)
    - Order Desmothoracida Hertwig & Lesser 1874, family Clathrulinidae Claus 1874. Genera not assigned to any lower taxon: Actinosphaeridium, Cienkowskya, Clathrulina, Hedriocystis, Penardiophrys. Incertae sedis genus: Servetia.
  - Class Chlorarachnea (Chlorarachniophyceae) Hibberd & Norris 1984. Incertae sedis genus: Rhabdamoeba.
    - Order Chlorarachnida (Chlorarachniales) Ishida et al. 1996
      - Family Chlorarachniidae Ishida et al. 1996, genera Bigelowiella, Chlorarachnion, Norisiella, Partenskyella, ?Cryptochlora.
      - Family Gymnochloridae Cavalier-Smith in Cavalier-Smith, Chao & Lewis 2018, genera Gymnochlora, Amorphochlora, Viridiuvalis.
      - Family Lotharellidae Cavalier-Smith in Cavalier-Smith, Chao & Lewis 2018, genus Lotharella.
    - Order Minorisida Cavalier-Smith 2018, family Minorisidae Cavalier-Smith 2018, genus Minorisa.
  - Infraphylum Monadofilosa Cavalier-Smith 1997
    - Incertae sedis:
      - Order Discocelida Cavalier-Smith 1997, family Discoceliidae Cavalier-Smith 1993, orthog. emend. 2012, genus Discocelia.
      - Order Krakenida Dumack et al. 2017 ex Cavalier-Smith 2018, family Krakenidae Dumack et al. 2017, genus Kraken.
      - Family Katabiidae Cavalier-Smith in Cavalier-Smith & Oates 2012, genus Katabia.
      - Family Psammonobiotidae Golemansky 1974, emend. Meisterfeld 2002, genera Alepiella, Chardezia, Edaphonobiotus, Feuerbornia, Frenzelina, Lesquerella, Micramphora, Micropsammella, Nadinella, Ogdeniella, Psammonobiotus, Propsammonobiotus, Rhumbleriella.
      - Family Volutellidae Sudzuki 1979, genera Pseudovolutella, Volutella.
    - Order Cercomonadida Poche 1913, emend. Vickerman 1983, emend. Mylnikov 1986, emend. Karpov et al. 2006; emend Howe et al. 2009; emend Cavalier-Smith 2012
      - Family Cavernomonadidae Cavalier-Smith in Cavalier-Smith & Karpov 2012, Cavernomonas.
      - Family Cercomonadidae Kent 1880/1, emend. Cavalier-Smith 2012, Cercomonas, Eocercomonas, Filomonas, Neocercomonas.
    - Order Paracercomonadida Cavalier-Smith in Cavalier-Smith, Chao & Lewis 2018, family Paracercomonadidae Cavalier-Smith & Karpov 2012, genera Brevimastigomonas, Metabolomonas, Nucleocercomonas, Paracercomonas, Phytocercomonas.
    - Order Glissomonadida^{(P)} Howe & Cavalier-Smith in Howe et al. 2009 (Heteromitidae Kent 1880, emend. Mylnikov 1990, emend. Mylnikov & Karpov 2004). Genus not assigned to any family: Neuromorpha.
      - Family Saccharomycomorphidae Feng et al. 2021, genus Saccharomycomorpha^{(P)}.
      - Family Viridiraptoridae^{(P)} Hess & Melkonian 2013, genera Orciraptor, Viridiraptor.
      - Family Sandonidae^{(P)} Howe et al. 2009, genera Sandona^{(P)}, Flectomonas, Neoheteromita^{(P)}, Mollimonas.
      - Family Dujardinidae Howe & Cavalier-Smith in Howe et al. 2011, genus Dujardina^{(P)}.
      - Family Bodomorphidae^{(P)} Hollande 1952, emend. Cavalier-Smith in Howe et al. 2009, genus Bodomorpha^{(P)}.
      - Family Proleptomonadidae Howe et al. 2009, genus Proleptomonas.
      - Family Allapsidae^{(P)} Howe & Cavalier-Smith in Howe et al. 2009, genera Allapsa^{(P)}, Teretomonas, Allantion.
    - Order Pansomonadida Vickerman in Vickerman et al. 2005
      - Family Agitatidae Cavalier-Smith & Bass in Bass et al. 2009, genus Agitata.
      - Family Aurigamonadidae Cavalier-Smith in Cavalier-Smith & Oates 2012, genus Aurigamonas.
    - Superfamily Sainouroidea Cavalier-Smith in Cavalier-Smith et al. 2009 (Helkesida Cavalier-Smith 2018)
      - Family Sainouridae^{(P)} Cavalier-Smith et al. 2008, genera Acantholus, Cholamonas, Homocognata, Sainouron.
      - Helkesimastigoidea Cavalier-Smith 2018
        - Family Helkesimastigidae Cavalier-Smith 2008, genus Helkesimastix.
        - Family Guttulinopsidae Olive 1970, genera Guttulinopsis, Olivorum, Puppisaman, Rosculus.
    - Class Thecofilosea Cavalier-Smith 2003, emend. Cavalier-Smith 2011
      - Incertae sedis:
        - Order Matazida Cavalier-Smith in Cavalier-Smith & Chao 2012, family Matazidae Cavalier-Smith in Cavalier-Smith & Chao 2012, genus Mataza.
      - Order Ventricleftida Cavalier-Smith in Howe et al. 2011.
        - Family Ventrifissuridae Cavalier-Smith in Cavalier-Smith, Chao & Lewis 2018, genus Ventrifissura.
        - Family Verrucomonadidae Cavalier-Smith in Cavalier-Smith, Chao & Lewis 2018, genus Verrucomonas.
      - Order Tectofilosida Cavalier-Smith 2003. (Note: A proposed suborder-level clade by Cavalier-Smith in 2018 named Fiscullina is not monophyletic because of uncultured tectofilosids.)
        - Family Chlamydophryidae De Saedeleer, 1934, genera Chlamydophrys Cienkowski 1876, Diaphoropodon Archer 1869, Lecythium Hertwig & Lesser 1874, Katarium Solbach 2024, Trachyrhizium Shiratori & Ishida 2016.
        - Family Fiscullidae Dumack, Mausbach and Bonkowski in Dumack et al. 2017, genera Fisculla, Omnivora.
        - Family Pseudodifflugiidae De Saedeleer 1934, genera Pseudodifflugia, Lenkorania.
        - Family Rhizaspididae Dumack, Mausbach & Bonkowski 2017, genus Rhizaspis.
      - Subclass Phaeodaria Haeckel 1879 stat. n. Cavalier-Smith in Howe et al. 2011 (=Tripylea Hertwig 1879)
        - Phaeoconchia Haeckel 1879, genera Coelodendrum, Coelographis, Conchellium, Conchopsis.
        - Phaeocystina Haeckel 1879, genera Aulacantha, Aulographis, Cannoraphis.
        - Phaeogromia Haeckel 1879, genera Castanella, Challengeron, Haeckeliana, Medusetta, Tuscarora.
        - Phaeosphaeria Haeckel 1879, genera Aulosphaera, Cannosphaera, Sagosphaera.
      - Order Cryomonadida Cavalier-Smith 1993
        - Family Rhogostomidae Dumack et al. 2017, genera Rhogostoma, Sacciforma, Capsellina.
        - Family Protaspidae Cavalier-Smith 1993 (="Cryomonadidae" Cavalier-Smith 1993), genera Cryothecomonas, Protaspa.
      - Order Ebriida Deflandre 1936 (=Ebriacea Lemmermann 1901). Genus not assigned to any family: Botuliforma.
        - Family Hermesinidae Hovasse 1943, genera Hermesinum, †Hermesinella plus about twelve extinct genera.
        - Family Ditripodiidae Deflandre 1951, four extinct genera.
        - Family Ammodochiidae Deflandre 1950, two extinct genera.
        - Family Ebriidae Lemmermann 1901, orthog. emend. Poche 1913. Ebria, †Ebrinula.
    - Class Imbricatea^{(P)} Cavalier-Smith in Cavalier-Smith & Chao 2003, emend. Howe et al. 2011
      - Incertae sedis
        - Superorder Discomonada Cavalier-Smith in Cavalier-Smith, Chao & Lewis 2018, order Discomonadida Cavalier-Smith in Scoble & Cavalier-Smith 2014, family Discomonadidae Cavalier-Smith in Scoble & Cavalier-Smith 2014, genus Discomonas.
      - Order Spongomonadida Hibberd 1983, family Spongomonadidae Karpov 1990, genera Spongomonas, Rhipidodendron.
      - Order Marimonadida Cavalier-Smith & Bass in Howe et al. 2011
        - Family Abolliferidae Cavalier-Smith in Cavalier-Smith, Chao & Lewis 2018, genera Abollifer, Cowlomonas and probably Heterochromonas.
        - Family Auranticordidae Cavalier-Smith in Cavalier-Smith, Chao & Lewis 2018, genera Auranticordis.
        - Family Cyranomonadidae Cavalier-Smith in Cavalier-Smith, Chao & Lewis 2018, genus Cyranomonas.
        - Family Pseudopirsoniidae Cavalier-Smith in Cavalier-Smith, Chao & Lewis 2018, genus Pseudopirsonia.
      - Order Variglissida Cavalier-Smith in Scoble and Cavalier-Smith 2014
        - Family Clautriaviidae Cavalier-Smith in Cavalier-Smith & Scoble 2013, genus Clautriavia.
        - Family Nudifilidae Cavalier-Smith in Howe et al. 2011, genus Nudifila.
        - Family Quadriciliidae Cavalier-Smith in Cavalier-Smith, Chao & Lewis 2018, genus Quadricilia.
      - Order Thaumatomonadida^{(P?)} Shirkina 1987
        - Family Thaumatomonadidae Hollande 1952. Allas, Hyaloselene, Reckertia, Thaumatomonas, Thaumatomastix, Ovaloplaca, Scutellomonas, Thaumatospina, Penardeugenia.
        - Family Peregriniidae Cavalier-Smith 2011. Gyromitus, Peregrinia.
        - Family Esquamulidae Shiratori et al. 2012, genus Esquamula.
      - Superorder Euglyphia Cavalier-Smith in Cavalier-Smith, Chao & Lewis 2018
        - Order Euglyphida Copeland 1956, emend. Cavalier-Smith 1997. Incertae sedis genera: Phaeobola, Ampullataria, Euglyphidion, Heteroglypha, Matsakision, Pareuglypha and Pileolus.
          - Family Cyphoderiidae de Saedeleer 1934, genera Campascus, Corythionella, Cyphoderia [Schaudinnula], Messemvriella, Pseudocorythion, Ichthyosquama, Knarr, Oleiformis, Psammoderia.
          - Family Paulinellidae de Saedeleer 1934, emend. Adl et al. 2012, genera Micropyxidiella, Ovulinata, Paulinella.
          - Suborder Euglyphina Kosakyan et al. 2016. Genus not assigned to any family: Tracheleuglypha. (Note: There is only one molecular sequence from this genus, which causes long branches in gene phylogenies, and the node is unresolved.)
            - Family Assulinidae Lara et al. 2007, genera Assulina, Placocista, Valkanovia.
            - Family Sphenoderiidae Chatelain et al. 2013, genera Sphenoderia, Trachelocorythion, Deharvengia.
            - Family Trinematidae Hoogenraad & De Groot 1940, emend Adl et al. 2012, genera Corythion, Playfairina, Puytoracia, Trinema.
            - Family Euglyphidae Wallich 1864, emend Lara et al. 2007, genera Euglypha, Scutiglypha.
        - Order Zoelucasida Cavalier-Smith in Scoble & Cavalier-Smith 2014, family Zoelucasidae Cavalier-Smith in Scoble & Cavalier-Smith 2014, genus Zoelucasa.
        - Order Trivalvulariida Siemensma & Dumack 2020, family Trivalvulariidae Siemensma & Dumack 2020, genera Leptogromia, Trivalvularis.
    - Class Metromonadea Cavalier-Smith 2007, emend. Cavalier-Smith 2011
      - Order Metopiida Cavalier-Smith in Cavalier-Smith & Chao 2003
        - Family Metopiidae Cavalier-Smith in Cavalier-Smith & Chao 2003, genera Metopion, Micrometopion.
      - Order Metromonadida Bass & Cavalier-Smith 2004
        - Family Metromonadidae Bass & Cavalier-Smith 2004, genus Metromonas.
        - Family Kiitoksiidae Cavalier-Smith in Cavalier-Smith & Scoble 2014, genus Kiitoksia.
- Subphylum Endomyxa^{(P)} Cavalier-Smith 2002, emend. Cavalier-Smith in Bass et al. 2009. Genus not assigned to any lower taxon: Viscidocauda.
  - Phytorhiza Sierra et al. 2015
    - Class Vampyrellidea Cavalier-Smith 2018, order Vampyrellida West 1901, emend. Hess et al. 2012 (=Aconchulinida De Saedeleer 1934). Incertae sedis genera: Thalassomyxa, Arachnula, Gobiella, Lateromyxa, Penardia.
      - Family Vampyrellidae Zopf 1885, genus Vampyrella.
      - Family Leptophryidae Hess, Sausen & Melkonian 2012, genera Arachnomyxa, Leptophrys, Planctomyxa, Platyreta, Pseudovampyrella, Theratromyxa, Vernalophrys.
      - Family Placopodidae Jahn 1928 (=Hyalodiscidae Poche 1913), genus Placopus.
      - Family Sericomyxidae More, Simpson & Hess 2021, genus Sericomyxa.
    - Class Phytomyxea Engler & Prantl 1897. Genus not assigned to any lower taxon: Marinomyxa.
      - Order Plasmodiophorida Cook 1928 (Plasmodiophorales Engl. 1892; Plasmodiophoromycota R.H. Whittaker 1969), family Plasmodiophoridae Zopf 1884, genera Plasmodiophora (=Ostenfeldiella), Polymyxa, Woronina, Ligniera (=Anisomyxa, Rhizomyxa, Sorolpidium), Sorosphaerula (=Tuburcinia, Sorosporium), Spongospora (=Clathrosorus), Membranosorus, Octomyxa, Polymyxa, Sorodiscus, Tetramyxa (=Molliardia, Thecaphora).
      - Order Phagomyxida Cavalier-Smith 1993, family Phagomyxidae Cavalier-Smith 1993, genera Phagomyxa, Maullinia.
  - Superclass Marimyxia Cavalier-Smith 2018
    - Order Reticulosida Cavalier-Smith in Cavalier-Smith & Chao 2003 emend. Bass et al. 2009, family Filoretidae Cavalier-Smith & Bass in Bass et al. 2009, genus Filoreta.
    - Order Gromiida Claparède & Lachmann 1856, family Gromiidae Reuss 1862, genus Gromia.
    - Class Ascetosporea Sprague 1979, emend. Cavalier-Smith 2009
      - Order Claustrosporida Cavalier-Smith in Cavalier-Smith & Chao 2003, genus Claustrosporidium.
      - Order Haplosporida Caullery & Mesnil 1899, genera Bonamia, Haplosporidium, Minchinia, Urosporidium.
      - Order Mikrocytida Hartikainen et al. 2013, family Mikrocytidae Cavalier-Smith in Cavalier-Smith, Chao & Lewis 2018, genera Mikrocytos, Paramikrocytos.
      - Order Paradiniida Cavalier-Smith in Bass et al. 2009, family Paradiniidae Schiller 1935, genus Paradinium.
      - Order Paramyxida Chatton 1911, genera Marteilia, Paramyxa, Paramarteilia, Marteilioides, Eomarteilia.
  - Family Heliomorphidae Cavalier-Smith & Bass in Bass et al. 2009, genus Heliomorpha.

=== Foraminifera ===
- - - - - Globothalamea
        - - Xenophyophorea
          - 'monothalamids'
      - 'monothalamids'
    - Tubothalamea
  - 'monothalamids'

Cladogram of foraminifera based on a 2022 phylogenetic analysis.

The foraminifera, or forams, are a diverse group of single-celled aquatic amoebae, usually bearing an organic or calcareous wall, amounting to over 6,700 living species and many fossil taxa. They were originally classified as an order of protozoa (Foraminiferida) belonging to the now obsolete Granoreticulosa, along with other reticulose amoebae. Later they were separated into their own phylum by most protozoologists, although maintained as a class by micropaleontologists, until they were placed as a subphylum of phylum Retaria along with the Radiolaria. They are divided into three classes (or subclasses, when globally treated as a class): the paraphyletic monothalamids, containing amoebae with single-chambered organic walls and a few naked amoebae (e.g., the large xenophyophores); and the monophyletic Globothalamea and Tubothalamea, which evolved from monothalamids, each containing amoebae with multi-chambered tests, either organic or calcareous. Some alternate systems of dividing foraminifera into classes have been proposed, but none have gained consensus. The relationships of monothalamids remain a work in progress due to the limited amount of genetic data.

Foraminiferal classification was compiled numerous times through the 20th century, culminating in 1987 with the catalogue of foraminiferal genera published by paleontologists Alfred R. Loeblich Jr and Helen Tappan. Later, catalogues have been published individually for separate groups of foraminifera on the basis of morphology and ecology. Two classifications for exclusively agglutinated (organic-walled) foraminiferal genera were published in 2001 and 2014, and one classification for planktonic foraminifera was published in 2022.

Subphylum Foraminifera d'Orbigny 1826

- ^{?}Lagenida
- ^{?}Heterogromia
- ^{?}Komokiacea*
- Class Monothalamea^{(P)} Haeckel 1862 sensu Pawlowski et al. 2013 ('monothalamids'). Genera not assigned to any lower taxon: Adhaerentella, Astrammina, Bathysiphon, Bowseria, Crithionina, Flaviatella, Notodendrodes, Psammophaga, Leannia, Nujappikia.
  - Family Lieberkuehniidae Siemensma et al. 2021, genera Lieberkuehnia, Claparedellus.
  - Family Edaphoallogromiidae Siemensma et al. 2021, genus Edaphoallogromia.
  - Family Lacogromiidae Siemensma & Holzmann 2021, genus Lacogromia.
  - Family Limnogromiidae Holzmann & Siemensma 2021, genus Limnogromia.
  - Family Schizamminidae Nørvang, 1961, genera Jullienella, Schizammina, Spiculosiphon.
  - Family Velamentofexidae Völcker & Clauß 2021, genus Velamentofex.
  - Order Allogromiida^{(P)} Hartog in Harmer & Shipley 1906
    - Family Allogromiidae Rhumbler 1904, genera Allogromia, Vellaria.
    - Family Reticulomyxidae Page 1987 emend. Hülsmann 2014, genera Reticulomyxa, Dracomyxa, Haplomyxa, Wobo.
  - Order Astrorhizida Lankester 1885
    - Suborder Astrorhizina Lankester 1885
      - Superfamily Xenophyophoroidea Tendal 1972, genera Abyssalia, Aschemonella, Bizarria, Claraclippia, Galatheammina, Homogammina, Moanammina, Psammina, Reticulammina, Rhizammina, Semipsammina, Shinkaiya, Spiculammina, Stannophyllum, Stereodiktyoma, Syringammina, Tendalia.
- Class Tubothalamea Pawlowski et al. 2012. †Fusulinida Delage & Hérouard 1896 probably belongs to this group.
  - Order Miliolida Delage & Hérouard 1896. Alveolina, Cornuspira, Miliammina, Pyrgo, Quinqueloculina, Sorites.
  - Order Spirillinida Hohenegger & Piller 1975. Patellina, Spirillina.
  - Family Ammodiscidae Reuss 1862. Ammodiscus, Glomospira.
- Class Globothalamea Pawlowski et al. 2012
  - Order Loftusiida Kaminski 2004
    - Suborder Biokovinina Kaminski 2004
      - Superfamily Biokovinoidea Gušić 1977
        - Family Charentiidae Loeblich & Tappan 1985, genera Charentia, Ismailia, Karaisella, Melathrokerion, Moncharmontia, Praekaraisella, Praepeneroplis.
      - Superfamily Coscinophragmatoidea Thalmann 1951
        - Family Haddoniidae Saidova 1981, genera Haddonia, Stylonina.
        - Family Coscinophragmatidae Thalmann 1951, genera Alpinophragmium, Ammotrochoides, Bdelloidina, Goellipora, Coscinophragma.
    - Suborder Loftusiina Kaminski & Mikhalevich 2004
      - †Superfamily Haplophragmioidea Eimer & Fickert 1899
        - †Family Cribratinidae Loeblich & Tappan 1964, genera Cribratina, Sievoides.
        - †Family Haplophragmiidae Eimer & Fickert 1899, genus Haplophragmium.
        - †Family Labyrinthidomatidae Loeblich & Tappan 1987, genera Bulbophragmium, Labyrinthidoma.
      - Superfamily Loftusioidea Brady 1884
        - Family Cyclamminidae Marie 1941
          - Subfamily Alveolophragmiinae Saidova 1981, genera Alveolophragmium, †Popovia, †Quasicyclammina, †Reticulophragmoides, Reticulophragmium, †Sabellovoluta.
          - †Subfamily Buccicrenatinae Loeblich & Tappan 1985, genus Buccicrenata.
          - †Subfamily Choffatellinae Maync 1958, genera Abuhammadina, Bramkampella, Choffatella, Paracyclammina, Torinosuella.
          - Subfamily Cyclammininae Marie 1941, genus Cyclammina.
          - †Subfamily Hemicyclammininae Banner 1966, genera Alveocyclammina, Flabellamminopsis, Hemicyclammina.
          - †Subfamily Pseudochoffatellinae Loeblich & Tappan 1985, genera Balkhania, Broeckinella, Dhrumella, Montsechiana, Pseudochoffatella, Torremiroella.
        - †Family Ecougellidae Loeblich & Tappan 1985, genus Ecougella.
        - †Family Everticyclamminidae Septfontaine 1988, genera Everticyclammina, Rectocyclammina.
        - †Family Hottingeritidae Loeblich & Tappan 1985, genus Hottingerita.
        - †Family Loftusiidae Brady 1884, genera Loftusia, Praereticulinella, Reticulinella.
        - †Family Mesoendothyridae Voloshinova 1958
          - †Subfamily Mesoendothyrinae Banner 1966, genera Audienusina, Mesoendothyra.
          - †Subfamily Labyrinthininae Septfontaine 1988, genus Labyrinthina.
          - †Subfamily Levantinellinae Fourcade, Mouty & Teherani 1997, genus Levantinella.
          - †Subfamily Planiseptinae Septfontaine 1988 nom. nud., genera Planisepta, Paleomayncina, Orbitammina, Orbitopsella.
        - †Family Ramalhoidae Schlagintweit 2024, genus Ramalhoa.
        - †Family Spirocyclinidae Munier-Chalmas 1887, genus Martiguesia, Pseudospirocyclina, Qataria, Reissella, Saudia, Sornayina, Spirocyclina, Sreptocyclammina, Thomasella, Vania.
        - †Family Suraqalatiidae Schlagintweit & Rashidi 2018, genus Suraqalatia.
        - †Family Syrianidae Kaminski 2004, genus Syriana.
    - Suborder Orbitolinina Kaminski 2004
      - †Superfamily Pfenderinoidea Smout & Sugden 1962
        - †Family Bakhtiarellidae Schlagintweit & Rashidi 2022, genus Bakhtiarellia.
        - †Family Hauraniidae Septfontaine 1988
          - †Subfamily Amijellinae Septfontaine 1988, genera Alveosepta, Alzonella, Alzonorbitopsella, Amijiella, Anchispirocyclina, Bostia, Ijdranella, Kastamonina, Palaeocyclammina, Pseudocyclammina, Redmondellina, Spiraloconulus.
          - †Subfamily Hauraniinae Septfontaine 1988, genera Cymbriaella, Gutnicella, Haurania, Meyendorffina, Platyhaurania, Socotraina, Timidonella.
  - Order Rotaliida Delage & Hérouard 1896
    - Family Planorbulinidae Schwager 1877. Planorbulinella, Hyalinea.
    - Superfamily Discorboidea Ehrenberg 1838
      - Family Discorbidae Ehrenberg 1838. Discorbis.
      - Family Rosalinidae Reiss 1963. Rupertina, Discanomalina, "Rosalina", Gavelinopsis, Planorbulina.
    - Superfamily Rotalioidea Ehrenberg 1839, emend. Pawlowski 2013. Genera incertae sedis: Criboelphidium, "Elphidium", Protelphidium.
      - Family Elphidiidae Galloway 1933, genus Elphidium.
      - Family Ammoniidae Saidova 1981, genus Ammonia.
      - Family Elphidiellidae Holzmann & Pawlowski 2017, genus Elphidiella.
      - Family Haynesinidae Mikhalevich 2013, genera Haynesina, Aubignyna.
    - Superfamily Glabratelloidea Loeblich & Tappan 1964
      - Family Rotaliellidae Loeblich & Tappan 1964, genera Rotaliella, Rossyatella.
      - Family Buliminoididae Seiglie 1970, genus Buliminoides.
      - Family Glabratellidae Loeblich & Tappan 1964, genera Glabratella, Glabratellina, Angulodiscorbis, Planoglabratella.
    - Superfamily Calcarinoidea Schwager 1876
      - Family Calcarinidae Schwager 1876, genera Neorotalia, Baculogypsina, Baculogypsinoides, Schlumbergerella, Pararotalia.
    - Superfamily Nummulitoidea de Blainville 1827, family Nummulitidae de Blainville 1827, genera Nummulites, Operculinella, Cycloclypeus, Heterostegina, Operculina, Planoperculina, Planostegina.
    - Superfamily Serioidea Holzmann & Pawlowski 2017
      - Family Uvigerinidae Haeckel 1894, genera Uvigerina, Rectuvigerina, Trifarina.
      - Family Bolivinitidae Glaessner 1937, genera Bolivina, Brizalina, Saidovina.
      - Family Cassidulinidae d'Orbigny 1839, genera Globocassidulina, Cassidulinoides, Evolvocassidulina, Islandiella, Ehrenbergina
      - Family Sphaeroidinidae Cushman 1927, genus Sphaeroidina.
      - Family Globobuliminidae Cushman 1927, genus Globobulimina.
    - Incertae sedis families
      - ^{?}Family Nonionidae Schultze 1854, genera Nonion, Nonionella, Nonionellina, Nonionoides.
      - ^{?}Family Virgulinellidae Loeblich & Tappan 1984, genus Virgulinella.
      - ^{?}Family Buliminidae Jones 1875, genus Bulimina.
      - ^{?}Family Epistominellidae Holzmann & Pawlowski 2017, genus Epistominella.
      - ^{?}Family Stainforthiidae Reiss 1963, genera Stainforthia, Gallitellia.
      - ^{?}Family Cibicididae Cushman 1927, genera Cibicides, Cibicidoides, Heterolepa.
      - ^{?}Family Chilostomellidae Brady 1881, genus Chilostomella.
      - ^{?}Family Pullenidae Schwager 1877, genus Pullenia.
      - ^{?}Family Nuttalidae Saidova 1981, genus Nuttalides.
      - ^{?}Family Discorbinellidae Sigal 1952, genera Discorbinella, Hanzawaia.
      - ^{?}Family Astrononionidae Cushman & Edwards 1937, genus Astrononion.
      - ^{?}Family Oridorsalidae Loeblich & Tappan 1984, genus Oridorsalis.
      - ^{?}Family Melonidae Holzmann & Pawlowski 2017, genus Melonis.
      - ^{?}Family Cymbaloporidae Cushman 1927, genus Cymbaloporella.
      - ^{?}Family Rubratelliidae Holzmann & Pawlowski 2017, genus Rubratella.
      - ^{?}Family Murrayinelliidae Holzmann & Pawlowski 2017, genus Murrayinella.
  - Order Globigerinida^{(P)} Lankester 1885 emend. Arz, Arenillas & Gilabert 2022
    - †Superfamily Parvularugoglobigerinoidea Arenillas, Arz & Gilabert 2022
      - †Family Parvularuglobigerinidae Arenillas, Arz & Gilabert 2022, genera Pseudocaucasina, Palaeoglobigerina, Parvularugoglobigerina.
    - Superfamily Eoglobigerinoidea BouDagher-Fadel 2012
      - †Family Eoglobigerinidae Blow 1979, genera Alicantina, Eoclavatorella, Eoglobigerina, Parasubbotina, Pseudoglobigerinella, Subbotina, Turbeogloborotalia.
      - Family Globoquadrinidae Blow 1979, genera Dentoglobigerina, Globoquadrina.
      - †Family Neoacarininidae BouDagher-Fadel 2012, genus Neoacarinina.
      - †Family Porticulasphaeridae Banner 1982, genera Globigerinatheka, Guembelitrioides, Inordinatosphaera, Orbulinoides, Porticulasphaera.
    - Superfamily Globigerinoidea Carpenter, Parker & Jones 1862
      - Family Globigerinidae Carpenter, Parker & Jones 1862, genera Alloglobigerinoides, Ciperoella, Globigerina, Globicuniculus, Globigerinoides, Globigerinoidesella, Globoturborotalita, Trilobigerina (=Trilobatus), Zeaglobigerina.
      - Family Globigerinellidae BouDagher-Fadel 2012, genera Beella, Bolliella, Globigerinella, Orcadia, Protentella, Quiltyella.
      - Family Hastigerinidae Bolli, Loeblich & Tappan 1957, genera Hastigerina, Hastigerinella, Hastigerinopsis.
      - Family Orbulinidae Schultze 1854, genera Biorbulina, Candorbulina, Orbulina, Praeorbulina.
      - Family Sphaeroidinellidae Banner & Blow 1959, genera Prosphaeroidinella, Sphaeroidinella, Sphaeroidinellopsis.
      - Family Turborotalitidae Hofker 1976, genera Berggrenia, Turborotalita.
    - Superfamily Globorotalioidea Cushman 1927
      - †Family Catapsydracidae Bolli, Loeblich & Tappan 1957, genera Catapsydrax, Globigerinopsoides, Globigerinoita, Velapertina.
      - Family Globorotaloididae Banner & Blow 1959, genera Clavatorella, Globorotaloides, Protentelloides.
      - Family Globorotaliidae Cushman 1927, genera Dentigloborotalia, Globoconella, Globorotalia, Hirsutella, Jenkinsella, Menardella, Neogloboquadrina, Paragloborotalia, Truncorotalia.
      - Family Pulleniatinidae Cushman 1927, genus Pulleniatina.
    - †Superfamily Globanomalinidoidea Loeblich & Tappan 1984, family Globanomalinidae Loeblich & Tappan 1984, genera Carinoturborotalia, Globanomalina, Luterbacheria, Planoglobanomalina, Turborotalia.
    - †Superfamily Hantkeninoidea Cushman 1927
      - †Family Pseudohastigerinidae Canudo 1990, genus Pseudohastigerina.
      - †Family Hantkeninidae Cushman 1927, genera Applinella, Aragonella, Clavigerinella, Cribrohantkenina, Hantkenina.
    - †Superfamily Truncorotaloidinoidea BouDagher-Fadel 2012
      - †Family Globigerapsidae Blow 1979, genera Globigerapsis, Muricoglobigerina.
      - †Family Planorotalitidae BouDagher-Fadel 2012, genera Astrorotalia, Planorotalites.
      - †Family Truncorotaloididae Loeblich & Tappan 1961. Acarinina, Igorina, Morozovella, Morozovelloides, Pearsonites, Praemurica, Pseudogloboquadrina, Testacarinata, Truncorotaloides.
  - †Order Globotruncanida Arz, Arenillas & Gilabert 2022
    - †Superfamily Abathomphaloidea Arz, Arenillas & Gilabert 2022
      - †Family Abathomphalidae Pessagno 1967, genus Abathomphalus.
      - †Family Globotruncanellidae Maslakova 1964, genera Globotruncanella, Spinoglobotruncanella.
    - †Superfamily Favuselloidea Longoria 1974
      - †Family Conoglobigerinidae BouDagher-Fadel, Banner & Whittaker 1997, genera Conoglobigerina, Tenuigerina, ^{?}Sphaerogerina.
      - †Family Favusellidae Longoria 1974, genera Ascoliella, Favusella, Koutsoukosia.
      - †Family Globuligerinidae Loeblich & Tappan 1984, genera Compactogerina, Globuligerina, Haeuslerina, Petaloglobigerina.
    - †Superfamily Hedbergelloidea Longoria & Gamper 1975
      - †Family Ananiidae El-Nakhal 2010, genera Anania, Badriella, Costellagerina, Hillsella, Liuenella [Liuella], Loeblichella, Muricohedbergella, Paracostellagerina, Pessagnoina, Planohedbergella, Pseudoclavihedbergella, Vanhintella.
      - †Family Hedbergellidae Loeblich & Tappan 1961, genera Asterohedbergella, Clavihedbergella, Hedbergella, Microhedbergella, Paraticinella, Pseudoguembelitria.
      - †Family Helvetoglobotruncanidae Lamolda 1976, genera Angulocarinella, Bermudeziana, Bollitruncana, Fingeria, Hedbergellita, Brittonella, Helvetoglobotruncana, Unitruncatus, Whiteinella.
      - †Family Praehedbergellidae Banner & Desai 1988, genera Blefuscuiana, Gorbachikella, Praehedbergella, Lilliputianella, Lilliputianelloides, Wondersella.
    - †Superfamily Globotruncanoidea Brotzen 1942
      - †Family Globotruncanidae Brotzen 1942, genera Contusotruncana, Globotruncana, Marginotruncana, Obliquacarinata, Sphaerotruncana, Ventrotruncana.
      - †Family Praeglobotruncanidae Ion 1983, genera Concavatotruncana, Dicarinella, Falsotruncana, Rotundina, Praeglobotruncana, Verotruncana.
      - †Family Reissidae Korchagin 2001, genera Elevatotruncana, Globotruncanita, Kassabiana, Radotruncana, Sigalitruncana, Turbotruncana.
    - †Superfamily Planomalinoidea Bolli, Loeblich & Tappan 1957
      - †Family Eohastigerinellidae Loeblich & Tappan 1984, genera Eohastigerinella, Hastigerinoides.
      - †Family Globigerinelloididae Longoria 1974, genera Alanlordella, Allotheca, Biglobigerinella, Blowiella, Claviblowiella, Globigerinelloides, Pseudoschackoina.
      - †Family Planomalinidae Bolli, Loeblich & Tappan 1957, genera Bannerina, Planomalina, Pseudoplanomalina.
      - †Family Schackoinidae Pokorný 1958, genera Asymetria, Groshenyia, Leupoldina, Neoschackoina, Schackoina.
    - †Superfamily Rotaliporoidea Sigal 1958
      - †Family Rotaliporidae Sigal 1958, genera Anaticinella, Pseudothalmanninella, Rotalipora, Thalmanninella.
      - †Family Ticinellidae Longoria 1974, genera Biticinella, Claviticinella, Ticinella.
    - †Superfamily Rugoglobigerinoidea Subbotina 1959
      - †Family Helvetiellidae Longoria & Gamper 1984, genera Archaeoglobigerina, Bucherina, Dorbignya, Edgarinella, Gandolfia, Gansserina, Globocarinata, Helvetiella, Kuglerina.
      - †Family Rugoglobigerinidae Subbotina 1959, genera Archaeoglobitruncana, Plummerita, Rugoglobigerina, Rugosocarinata, Rugotruncana, Trinitella.
  - †Order Heterohelicida Fursenko 1958 emend. Arz, Arenillas & Gilabert 2022
    - †Superfamily Heterohelicoidea Cushman 1927
      - †Family Gublerinidae Aliyulla 1977, genera Gublerina, Lipsonia, Praegublerina.
      - †Family Heterohelicidae Cushman 1927, genera Braunella, Bronnimannella, Ehrenbergites, Globoheterohelix, Fleisherites, Hartella, Heterohelix, Huberella, Laeviheterohelix, Lazarusina, Lunatriella, Magellanina, Mihaia, Nederbragtina, Planoheterohelix, Protoheterohelix, Pseudoplanoglobulina, Steineckia, Striataella, Texasina, ^{?}Bifarina, ^{?}Rectoguembelina, ^{?}Zeauvigerina.
      - †Family Pseudotextulariidae Maamouri & Salaj 1978, genera Planoglobulina, Pseudotextularia, Racemiguembelina.
      - †Family Pseudoguembelinidae Aliyulla 1977, genera Eicheriella, Leptobimodalia, Pseudoguembelina.
      - †Family Spiroplectidae Cushman 1911, genera Hendersonites (=Hendersonia), Neohendersonites, Paraspiroplecta, Spiroplecta.
      - †Family Ventilabrellidae Maamouri & Salaj 1978, genera Planulitella, Proliferania, Sigalia, Ventilabrella.
  - †Order Guembelitriida Arenillas, Arz & Gilabert 2022
    - †Superfamiily Cassigerinelloidea Bolli, Loeblich & Tappan 1957, family Cassigerinellidae Bolli, Loeblich & Tappan 1957, genera Cassigerinella, Riveroinella.
    - †Superfamily Guembelitrioidea Montanaro-Gallitelli 1957, family Guembelitriidae Montanaro-Gallitelli 1957, genera Cassigerinelloita, Guembelitria, Chiloguembelitria, Jenkinsina, ?Archaeoguembelitria, ?Gallitellia, ?Guembelitriella.
    - †Superfamily Chiloguembelinoidea Reiss 1963, family Chiloguembelinidae Reiss 1963, genera Chiloguembelina, Woodringina, ?Streptochilus.
    - †Superfamily Globoconusoidea BouDagher-Fadel 2012, family Globoconusidae BouDagher-Fadel 2012, genera Globoconusa, Trochoguembelitria,
  - Order ? (unnamed)
    - Superfamily Globigerinitoidea BouDagher-Fadel 2012, emend. Arenillas, Arz & Gilabert 2022
      - Family Candeinidae Cushman 1927. Candeina.
      - †Family Globigerinatellidae BouDagher-Fadel 2012. Globigerinatella.
      - Family Globigerinitidae Bermúdez 1961, genera Globigerinita, Mutabella, Polyperibola, Tinophodella.
      - Family Tenuitellidae BouDagher-Fadel 2012, genera Praetenuitella, Tenuitella, Tenuitellinata, Tenuitellita.
      - †Family ? (unnamed), genera Dipsidripella, ?Antarcticella.
  - Order Robertinida Loeblich & Tappan 1984, genera Hoeglundina, Robertina, Robertinoides.
  - Order Textulariida^{(P)} Delage & Hérouard 1896, genera Cyclammina, Eggerella, Reophax, Textularia, Trochammina.
  - Order Carterinida Loeblich & Tappan 1981, genus Carterina.

=== Radiolaria ===
- Radiolaria Müller 1858, sensu Adl et al. 2005
  - Acantharea Haeckel 1881, emend. Mikrjukov 2000
    - Chaunocanthida Schewiakoff 1926. Amphiacon, Conacon, Gigartacon, Heteracon, Stauracon.
    - Holocanthida Schewiakoff 1926. Acanthochiasma, Acanthocolla, Acanthoplegma.
    - Symphyacanthida Schewiakoff 1926. Amphilithium, Astrolonche, Pseudolithium.
    - Arthracanthida Schewiakoff 1926. Acanthometra, Daurataspis, Dictyacantha, Diploconus, Phractopelta, Phyllostaurus, Pleuraspis, Stauracantha.
  - Taxopodida Fol 1883. Sticholonche.
  - Polycystinea Ehrenberg 1839 stat. nov. Levine et al. 1980
    - Spumellaria Ehrenberg 1876 stat. nov. Haeckel 1884
      - Hexacromyoidea Haeckel 1882 stat. nov. Suzuki et al. 2021 [Hexalonchata Afanasieva et al. 2005]
        - Hexacaryidae Haeckel 1882 stat. nov. Suzuki et al. 2021: Clevepilegma Dumatrica 2013, Haliphormis Ehrenberg 1846 [Hexastylanthus, Hexastylettus; Hexastylissus; Hexastylurus], Hexacaryum Haeckel 1882, Hexalonchetta Haeckel 1887, Hexancistra Haeckel 1879 [Hexancora], Hexapitys Haeckel 1882.
        - Hexacromyidae Haeckel 1882 stat. nov. Suzuki et al. 2021: Carpocanthum Chen & Tan 1989, Hexacromyum Haeckel 1882 [Cubosphaera; Hexacontura], Hexalonchilla Haeckel 1887 [Hexalonchusa; Staurolonchantha], Nanina Kozur & Mostler 1982 [Pentactinosphaera].
        - Hollandosphaeridae Deflandre 1973: Anomalosoma Loeblich & Tappan 1961 [Heterosoma Hollande & Enjumet 1960, Hollandosphaera Deflandre 1973 [Heliaster Hollande & Enjumet 1960], Tetrapetalon Hollande & Enjumet 1960.
      - Spongosphaeroidea Haeckel 1862 → Spongosphaeridae Haeckel 1862: Diplospongus Mast 1910, Spongodendron Hollande & Enjumet 1960, Spongosphaera Ehrenberg 1847 [Hexadoridium; Spongosphaeromma].
      - Lithocyclioidea Ehrenberg 1846
        - Astracturidae Haeckel 1882: Astromma Ehrenberg 1846 [Astractinium; Astractura; Astracturium; Astrococcura; Staurococcura], Amphactura Haeckel 1882 [Dicoccura; Diplactinium], Hymeniastrum Ehrenberg 1846 [Hymenastrella; Hymenactura; Hymenacturium; Trigonactinium; Hymenactinium; Pentactura; Trigonacturium].
        - Lithocycliidae Ehrenberg 1846: Cromyatractus Haeckel 1887 [Cromyatractium; Caryatractus], Heliosestrum Haeckel 1882 [Heliosestantha; Astrosestrum; Astrosestantha; Astrophacura; Staurodiscus Krasheninnikov 1960]; Heliostylus Haeckel 1882 [Astrostylus; Stylodiscus; Stylentodiscus], Lithocyclia Ehrenberg 1846 [Astrocyclia; Coccodiscus], Phacostaurus Haeckel 1882 [Phacostaurium, Astrostaurus, Crucidiscus, Heliostaurus, Sethostaurium, Sethostaurus, Staurentodiscus], Phacotriactis Sutton 1896, Sethostylus Haeckel 1882 [Sethostylium; Amphicyclia; Phacostylus; Phacostylium], Staurocyclia Haeckel 1882 [Coccostaurus], Triactiscus Haeckel 1882 [Trigonocyclia].
        - Panartidae Haeckel 1887: Cannartus Haeckel 1882 [Cannartidissa; Cannartiscus; Pipetta; Pipettaria; Pipettella; Druppula; Druppuletta], Diartus Sanfilippo & Riedel 1980, Didymocyrtis Haeckel 1862 [Artidium; Cyphinura; Cyphocolpus; Desmartus; Ommatocampula; Panaromium; Panartus; Panartella; Panartidium; Panartissa; Panartura; Peripanartium; Peripanartula; Peripanartus; Peripanicula], Spongolivella Dumitrica 2021.
        - Phacodiscidae Haeckel 1882: Periphaena Ehrenberg 1874 [Astrophacomma; Heliodiscomma; Perizona], Phacodiscus Haeckel 1882 [Phacodiscinus; Astrophacilla; Paracenodiscus; Phacodisculus; Prunulum; Prunuletta; Sethodiscinus].
      - Spongodiscoidea Haeckel 1862 emend. Suzuki 2021
        - Spongodiscidae Haeckel 1862: Spongaster Ehrenberg 1861 [Spongastrella; Histiastrella], Spongodiscus Ehrenberg 1854 [Spongodisculus], Spongotrochus Haeckel 1861 [Spongotrochiscus].
        - Euchitoniidae Stöhr 1880 emend. Suzuki 2021: Amphicraspedum Haeckel 1882 [Amphicraspedon; Aphirrhopella], Dictyocoryne Ehrenberg 1861 [Dictyocorynula; Dictyastrum; Dictyastrella; Euchitonia; Hymenastromma; Rhopalodictya; Rhopalodictyum; Styla; Pteractis], Hexinastrum Haeckel 1882 [Hexalastromma; Pentalastromma; Pentinastrum], Ommatocampe Haeckel 1861 [Ommatocampium; Amphymenium], Tessarastrum Haeckel 1887 [Tessarastrella; Hagiastromma; Tessarostromma], Tricanastrum Haeckel 1879 [Dicranaster; Dicranastrum; Myelastrella; Myelastrum; Spongomyelastrum; Myelastromma; Pentophiastromma; Spongodicranastrum; Spongohagiastrum; Spongopentophiastrum; Spongostaurina; Tetracranastrum; Triastrum], Trigonastrum Haeckel 1887 [Trigonastrella; Rhopalastromma; Chitonastromma; Amphicraspedina; Amphirrhopoma; Dictyastromma; Monaxonium; Trigonastromma].
        - Spongobrachiidae Haeckel 1882 emend. Suzuki 2021: Spongasteriscus Haeckel 1862 [Spongasterisculus; Dictyocorynium], Spongastromma Haeckel 1887, Spongobrachium Haeckel 1882.
      - Cladococcoidea Haeckel 1862 stat. nov. Suzuki et al. 2021
        - Ethmosphaeridae Haeckel 1862: Cyrtidosphaera Haeckel 1861, Ethmosphaera Haeckel 1861, [Ethmosphaerella; Monosphaera], Haplosphaera Hollande & Enjumet 1960, Heliosphaera Haeckel 1861 [Heliosphaerella], Liosphaera Haeckel 1887 [Melitomma, Craspedomma].
        - Cladococcidae Haeckel 1862: Arachnosphaera Haeckel 1861 [Arachnosphaerella], Arachnospongus Mast 1910, Cladococcus Müller 1856 [Cladococcalis; Anomalacantha; Cladococcodes; Cladococcurus; Porococcus], Diplosphaera Haeckel 1861 [Diplosphaeromma; Astrosphaera; Diplosphaerella; Leptosphaera; Leptosphaerella; Astrosphaerella; Astrospongus; Drymosphaeromma; Leptosphaeromma], Haeckeliella Hollande & Enjumet 1960, Lychnosphaera Haeckel 1882 [Rhizoplegmidium, Rhizospongus, Thalassoplegma].
      - Trematodiscoidea Haeckel 1862 emend. Suzuki 2021 → Trematodiscidae Haeckel 1862 emend. Suzuki 2021: Flustrella Ehrenberg 1839 [Centrospira; Discospirella; Trematodiscus; Perichlamydium; Perispirella; Stylochlamyum], Staurospira Haeckel 1887 [Staurodictyon; Tholodiscus; Xiphospira], Stylodictya Ehrenberg 1846 [Stylodictyon; Stylochlamydium; Stylochlamys; Stylospongia; Stylocyclia; Stylospira], Tripodictya Haeckel 1882 [Xiphodictyon].
      - Haliommoidea Ehrenberg 1846
        - Actinommidae Haeckel 1862 emend. Suzuki 2021: Actinomma Haeckel 1861 [Actinommetta; Haliommura; Rhaphidococcus; Riedelipyle; Dreyerella; Drymyomma; Cromyomma; Echinommura; Heliosomura; Spheropyle], Cromyechinus Haeckel 1882 [Cromyodrymus], Rhaphidocapsa Haeckel 1887, Sphaeractis Brandt in Wetzel 1936, Staurocaryum Haeckel 1882, Stomatosphaera Dreyer 1889, Stuermeria Deflandre 1964.
        - Haliommidae Ehrenberg 1846 emend. Suzuki 2021: Cromyosphaera Haeckel 1882 [Cromyommetta; Cromyommura], Haliomma Ehrenberg 1839 [Actinommilla; Cenosphaera; Circosphaera; Thecosphaerella], Haliommantha Haeckel 1887, Hexacontella Haeckel 1887, Melittosphaera Haeckel 1882 [Conoactinomma], Pseudostaurosphaera Krasheninnikov 1960 [Pseudostaurolonche].
        - Heliodiscidae Haeckel 1882 sensu De Wever et al. 2001: Actinommura Haeckel 1887 [Excentrosphaerella], Excentrococcus Dumitrica 1978, Excentrodiscus Hollande & Enjumet 1960, Heliodiscus Haeckel 1862 [Heliodiscilla, Heliocladus, Heliodiscetta, Heliodrymus, Heliodendrum, Heliosestilla], Helioferrusa Dumitrica 2019, Phaenicosphaera Haeckel 1887 [Dreyeropyle].
      - Lithelioidea Haeckel 1862 sensu Matsuzaki et al. 2015
        - †Conocaryommidae Lipman 1969: Conocaryomma Lipman 1969 [Conocromyomma].
        - Litheliidae Haeckel 1862 emend. Suzuki 2021: Lithelius Haeckel 1861 [Lithospira; Azerbaidjanicus], Middourium Kozlova 1999 [Monobrachium], Spiremaria Kozlova 1960 [Spiromultitunica], Spongocyclia Haeckel 1862 [Lithocarpium; Ommatodiscinus; Ommatodiscus; Ommatodisculus].
        - †Phaseliformidae Pessagno 1972: Phaseliforma Pessagno 1972.
        - †Pyramispongiidae Kozur & Mostler 1978 sensu O'Dogherty 1994: Pyramispongia Pessagno 1973 [Nodotetraedra].
        - Sponguridae Haeckel 1862: Ommatogramma Ehrenberg 1861 [Spongurus; Spongocorisca; Spongurantha; Spongurella].
      - Spongopyloidea Dreyer 1889 emend. Suzuki 2021
        - Spongopylidae Dreyer 1889 emend. Suzuki 2021: Schizodiscus Dogiel in Dogiel & Reshetnyak 1952, Spongobrachiopyle Kozur & Mostler 1978, Spongopyle Dreyer 1889 [Spongopylarium], Spongospira Stöhr 1880.
        - Cristallosphaeridae Popofsky 1912: Calcaromma Thomson 1877 [Cristallosphaera], Enalomelon Sugiyama 1992.
        - Prunopylidae Poche 1913: Prunopyle Dreyer 1889, Spongopylidium Dreyer 1889.
      - Phorticioidea Haeckel 1882 stat. nov. Suzuki et al. 2021 [Larnacillilae De Wever et al. 2001]
        - Amphitholidae Haeckel 1887 stat. nov. sensu De Wever et al. 2001
        - Circodiscidae Dumitrica 1989 stat. nov. Suzuki et al. 2021
        - Cryptolarnaciidae Dumitrica 1989 stat. nov. Suzuki et al. 2021
        - Histiastridae Dumitrica 1989 stat. nov. Suzuki et al. 2021
        - Phorticiidae Haeckel 1882 sensu Dumitrica 1989
      - Larcospiroidea Haeckel 1887 stat. nov. sensu Dumitrica 1989
        - Dipylissidae Dumitrica 1989 stat. nov. Suzuki et al. 2021
        - Larcospiridae Haeckel 1887 stat. nov. Suzuki et al. 2021
        - Palaeotetrapylidae Dumitrica 1989 stat. nov. Suzuki et al. 2021
        - Pylodiscidae Haeckel 1887 sensu Dumitrica 1989
        - Zonariidae Haeckel 1887 sensu Dumitrica 1989
      - Pseudoaulophacoidea Riedel 1967 sensu De Wever et al. 2001
        - Patulibracchiidae Pessagno 1971 sensu De Wever et al. 2001
        - Pseudoaulophacidae Riedel 1967 sensu De Wever et al. 2001
        - Suttoniidae Schaaf 1976 sensu Dumitrica 2019
      - Stylosphaeroidea Haeckel 1887 sensu Dumitrica 1984
        - Entapiidae Dumitrica in De Wever, Dumitrica, Caulet Nigrini & Caridroit 2001
        - Stylatractidae Schröder 1909 emend. Suzuki 2021
        - Tubosphaeridae Suzuki 2021
    - Nassellaria Ehrenberg 1875 emend. Haeckel 1887. Artostrobus, Eucyrtidium, Lithomelissa, Pterocanium, Pterocorys.
    - Collodaria Haeckel 1887. Acrosphaera, Collosphaera, Collozoum, Sphaerozoum, Rhaphidozoum, Siphonsphaera, Thalassicolla.
    - Orodaria Nakamura & Suzuki 2020
      - Oroscenidae Haeckel 1887 emend. Nakamura & Suzuki 2021 [Orosphaerida Haeckel 1887; Orosphaeridae Haecker 1908]. Oroscena, Orostaurus, Oropelex. Nomina dubia genera: Orosphaera, Orodictyum, Orona, Oronium.
      - Thalassothamnidae Haecker 1906 emend. Nakamura & Suzuki 2021 [Cytocladidae Schröder, 1908]. Thalassothamnus, Cytocladus. Nomen dubium genus: Conostylus.
    - †Entactinaria Kozur & Mostler 1982 sensu Nakamura & Suzuki 2020 (Note: According to Nakamura & Suzuki, the only extant (i.e. not extinct) orders of Polycystinea are Spumellaria, Nassellaria, Collodaria and Orodaria. Therefore, Entactinaria is considered an exclusively fossil group.)
      - †Entactiniidae Riedel 1967. Afanasievella, Apophysiactinia, Borisella, Callela, Cancellosphaera, Costaentactinia, Cyclocarpus nomen dubium, Duodecimentactinia, Langsonsphaera, Entactinosphaera, Gracilentactinia, Holdisphaera, Involutentactinia, Kashiwara, Magnentactinia, Magnisphaera, Microporosa, Moskovistella, Multientactinia, Munzuwonella, Paratriposphaera, Perforentactinia, Plenoentactinia, Plenosphaera, Pluristratoentactinia, Polyedroentactinia, Provisocyntra, Radiobisphaera, Retentactinia, Retisphaera, Sinosphaera, Spongentactinia, Stigmosphaerostylus, Trilonche, Uberinterna, Wuyia.
      - †Tetrentactiniidae Kozur & Mostler 1979. Multisphaera.
      - †Triassothamnidae Takahashi, Maekawa & Dumitrica 2022. Triassothamnus.

== Disparia ==
- - Membrifera
    - Hemimastigophora
    - Caelestes
  - Provora
    - Nebulidia
    - Nibbleridia

Cladogram of Disparia based on a 2025 phylogenomic analysis.

Disparia is a clade that unites several predatory protists, namely the provorans, hemimastigotes, and two mysterious genera Meteora and Solarion. It was described in 2025 through phylogenomic analyses that accompanied the discovery of Solarion. Prior to these analyses, provorans, hemimastigotes and Meteora were considered 'orphan' taxa, with unstable phylogenetic positions. The first provoran, Ancoracysta twista, was briefly proposed to be related to Haptista. However, in 2024 there was already evidence of a close affinity between Meteora, hemimastigotes, and provorans. The phylum Caelestes, described in 2025, encompasses two monotypic genera of protists with a unique stalked extrusome used for immobilizing prey bacteria. Their morphology resembles that of celestial bodies, after which they are named. Only one of the genera, Solarion, is assigned to a family, and no classes or orders have been defined. Hemimastigotes are a small group composed of ten species of heterotrophs with a pellicle and numerous flagella. First identified in 1988, they remained an orphan group for decades due to the absence of genetic information, with taxonomists hypothesizing affinities to many different protists. In 2018, two hemimastigotes were successfully sequenced and a phylogenomic analysis revealed their deep-branching placement near Diaphoretickes. Between 2024 and 2025, a closer relationship with the clades Provora and Caelestes was resolved. Provorans compose two ancient phyla of predatory microbes and a total of eight described species. They are small, fast-swimming predators capable of consuming larger prey, but are easily confused with other protists due to their unremarkable appearance; they required meticulous study to be recognized.

- Provora Tikhonenkov et al. 2022
  - Phylum Nebulidia Tikhonenkov et al. 2022, class Nebulidea Tikhonenkov et al. 2022, order Nebulidida Tikhonenkov et al. 2022, family Nebulidae Tikhonenkov et al. 2022, genera Ancoracysta, Nebulomonas.
  - Phylum Nibbleridia Tikhonenkov et al. 2022, class Nibbleridea Tikhonenkov et al. 2022, order Nibbleridida Tikhonenkov et al. 2022, family Nibbleridae Tikhonenkov et al. 2022, genera Nibbleromonas, Ubysseya.
- Membrifera Valt & Čepička in Valt et al. 2025
  - Phylum Caelestes Valt & Čepička in Valt et al. 2025
    - Meteora Hausmann, Weitere, Wolf & Arndt 2002
    - Family Solarionidae Valt & Čepička in Valt et al. 2025, sole genus Solarion.
  - Phylum Hemimastigophora Foissner, Blatterer & Foissner 1988, class Hemimastigea Foissner, Blatterer & Foissner 1988, order Hemimastigida Foissner, Blatterer & Foissner 1988.
    - Family Spironematellidae Silva 1980 emend. Shɨshkin 2022, genera Hemimastix, Spironematella (="Spironema"), Stereonema.
    - Family Paramastigidae Skuja 1948 emend. Karpov 2012, genus Paramastix.

== Excavates ==
=== Malawimonadida ===
- Malawimonadidae O' Kelly & Nerad 1999. Gefionella, Malawimonas.
- Imasidae Heiss, Simpson, & Kim 2020. Imasa.

=== Metamonada ===
The metamonads were first described by Pierre-Paul Grassé in the first volume of Traité de Zoologie, published in 1952, as the superorder Metamonadina or Anaxostylaria. They were originally composed of zooflagellates with four or more flagella, known as polymastigotes and hypermastigotes (e.g., Trichomonas, Oxymonas). These were later split into other groups such as the Parabasalia and Preaxostyla (over 260 and 140 species respectively), regarded as individual phyla. After rRNA phylogenetic analyses demonstrated their relatedness, the concept of metamonads was reintroduced by Cavalier-Smith as a monophyletic phylum Metamonada that includes both groups, as well as the anaerobic Fornicata (e.g., the free-living Carpediemonas and the parasitic Giardia; around 140 species). In this system, Preaxostyla is known as subphylum Anaeromonada, and Fornicata and Parabasalia are two infraphyla that belong to the subphylum Trichozoa. Still, some taxonomists retain the Parabasalia at a phylum level.

The classifications of Preaxostyla and Fornicata were last revised separately in the 2017 Handbook of the protists and the higher classification of Metamonada was revised by Cavalier-Smith in 2021. The classification of Parabasalia was completely updated in 2024. Two new smaller clades of metamonads have been described in addition: anaeramoebae and the 'BaSk' clade, containing barthelonids and skoliomonads. However, Parabasalia was treated as a separate phylum by the 2024 revision, instead of a member of phylum Metamonada.

Phylum Metamonada Grassé 1952 emend. stat. n. Cavalier-Smith 2003

- Family Anaeramoebidae Táborský, Pánek & Čepička 2017, genus Anaeramoeba.
- Subphylum Anaeromonada (=Preaxostyla Simpson 2003), class Anaeromonadea Cavalier-Smith 1996 emend. 2003
  - Order Trimastigida Cavalier-Smith 2003 emend. 2021, family Trimastigidae Kent 1880 emend. Zhang et al. 2015, genus Trimastix.
  - Order Paratrimastigida Cavalier-Smith 2022, family Paratrimastigidae Zhang, Taborsky, Silberman, Panek, Čepička & Simpson 2015, genus Paratrimastix.
  - Order Oxymonadida Grassé 1952. Genus not assigned to any family: Opisthomitus. (Note: One 18S rRNA phylogenetic analysis suggests that the genus Opisthomitus is affiliated with the family Pyrsonymphidae.)
    - Family Oxymonadidae, genera Barroella, Oxymonas, Microrhopalodina, Sauromonas, †Oxymonites, †Microrhopalodites, †Sauromonites.
    - Family Polymastigidae, genera Blattamonas, Brachymonas, Monocercomonoides, Paranotila, Polymastix, Tubulimonoides.
    - Family Pyrsonymphidae, genera Dinenympha, Pyrsonympha, †Dinenymphites, †Pyrsonymphites.
    - Family Saccinobaculidae, genera Notila, Saccinobaculus.
    - Family Streblomastigidae, genus Streblomastix.
- Subphylum Trichozoa^{(P)} Cavalier-Smith 1997
  - Infraphylum Fornicata Simpson 2003 stat. n. Cavalier-Smith 2022. Genus not assigned to any lower taxon: Aduncisulcus.
    - Class Carpomonadea^{(P)} Cavalier-Smith 2013
      - Order Carpediemonadida^{(P)} Cavalier-Smith 2013
        - Family Carpediemonadidae^{(P)} Cavalier-Smith 2013, genera Carpediemonas, Hicanonectes, Ergobibamus.
        - Family Kipferliidae Cavalier-Smith 2013, genus Kipferlia.
      - Order Chilomastigida^{(P)} Cavalier-Smith 2013, family Chilomastigidae^{(P)} Cavalier-Smith 2013, genus Chilomastix^{(P)}.
      - Order Dysnectida Cavalier-Smith 2013, family Dysnectidae Cavalier-Smith 2013, genus Dysnectes.
    - Class Eopharyngea^{(P)} Cavalier-Smith 1993 stat. n. 2013
      - Family Caviomonadidae Cavalier-Smith 2013, genera Caviomonas, Iotanema, Euthynema.
      - Order Retortamonadida^{(P)} (Note: Regarding the classification of Retortamonadida, there is a disconnect between the Cavalier-Smith system and the system described by different authors in the Handbook of the protists and other studies. The order Retortamonadida was originally defined as two genera: Chilomastix and Retortamonas. In 2013, Cavalier-Smith modified the retortamonads to only include Retortamonas, and describing a separate order Chilomastigida for Chilomastix only, placed among the early branching Carpediemonas-like organisms. However, this has not yet been recognized by later studies from the other authors.) Grassé 1952 emend. Cavalier-Smith 2013, family Retortamonadidae^{(P)} Wenrich 1932, genus Retortamonas^{(P)}.
      - Order Diplomonadida Wenyon 1926 (=Diplozoa Dangeard 1910)
        - Suborder Distomatina Kent 1880 (=Hexamitinae Kent 1880). Genera not assigned to any lower taxon: Gyromonas, Trigonomonas.
          - Family Spironucleidae Cavalier-Smith 1996, genus Spironucleus.
          - Family Enteromonadidae Kulda and Nohynková 1976, genus Enteromonas.
          - Family Hexamitidae^{(P)} Kent 1881, genera Trepomonas, Hexamita, Trimitus.
        - Suborder Giardiina Kulda & Nohýnková 1978 (=Giardiinae Kulda & Nohýnková 1978)
          - Family Octomitidae^{(P?)} Cavalier-Smith 1996, genera Octomitus, Brugerolleia.
          - Family Giardiidae Cavalier-Smith 1996, genus Giardia.
  - Infraphylum Parabasalia Honigberg 1973. Genera incertae sedis: Chilomitus, Rhizonympha, Tricercomitus, Trichocovina.
    - Class Hypotrichomonadea Čepička, Hampl & Kulda 2010, order Hypotrichomonadida Čepička, Hampl & Kulda 2010, family Hypotrichomonadidae Honigberg 1963 emend. Čepička, Hampl & Kulda 2010, genera Hypotrichomonas, Trichomitus.
    - Class Pimpavickea Boscaro & Keeling 2024, order Pimpavickida Céza & Čepička 2022, family Pimpavickidae Céza & Čepička 2022, genera Pimpavicka, Alexandriella.
    - Class Trichomonadea Kirby 1947 sensu Čepička, Hampl & Kulda 2010
      - Order Honigbergiellida Čepička, Hampl & Kulda 2010 emend. Boscaro & Keeling 2024
        - Family Hexamastigidae Čepička, Hampl & Kulda 2010 emend. Boscaro & Keeling 2024, genus Hexamastix.
        - Family Honigbergiellidae Čepička, Hampl & Kulda 2010, genera Honigbergiella, Ditrichomonoides, Honigbergiellopsis, Monotrichomonas.
        - Family Cthulhuidae Boscaro & Keeling 2024, genera Cthulhu, Cthylla, Nyarlathotep.
        - Family Tetratrichomastigidae Boscaro & Keeling 2024, genus Tetratrichomastix.
      - Order Trichomonadida Kirby 1947 sensu Čepička, Hampl & Kuda 2010. Genera incertae sedis: Pseudotrichomonas, †Paleotrichomones.
        - Family Lacusteriidae Céza & Čepička 2022, genus Lacusteria.
        - Family Trichomonadidae Chalmers & Pekkola 1918 sensu Hampl, Vrlík, Čepička, Pecka, Kulda & Tachezy 2006, genera Trichomonas, Cochlosoma, Cyathosoma, Pentatrichomonas, Pentatrichomonoides, Pseudotrypanosoma, Ptychostoma, Tetratrichomonas, Trichomitopsis, Trichomonoides.
    - Clade "Tla"
      - Class Lophomonadea Boscaro & Keeling 2024, order Lophomonadida Light 1927 emend. Cavalier-Smith 2013, family Lophomonadidae Kent 1880 emend. Cavalier-Smith 2013, genera Lophomonas, Eulophomonas, Prolophomonas.
      - Class Trichonymphea Poche 1913, order Trichonymphida Poche 1913
        - †Family Burmanymphidae Poinar 2009, genus Burmanympha.
        - Family Barbulanymphidae Boscaro & Keeling 2024, genera Barbulanympha, Rhynchonympha, Urinympha.
        - Family Hoplonymphidae Light 1926 emend. Boscaro & Keeling 2024, genus Hoplonympha.
        - Family Retractinymphidae Radek & Brune 2023, genus Retractinympha.
        - Family Spirotrichosomidae Hollande & Carruette-Valentin 1971, genera Spirotrichosoma, Apospironympha, Bispironympha, Colospironympha, Heliconympha, Leptospironympha, Macrospironympha.
        - Family Staurojoeninidae Grassi 1917, genera Staurojoenina, Idionympha.
        - Family Teranymphidae Koidzumi 1921, genera Tetranympha, Eucomonympha, Pseudotrichonympha.
        - Family Trichonymphidae Kent 1880, genus Trichonympha.
    - Clade "Cadamassta"
      - Class Cristamonadea Čepička, Hampl & Kulda 2010. Genera incertae sedis: Cyclojoenia, Joenia, Joenina, Joenoides, Joenopsis, Pachyjoenia, Parajoenopsis, Placojoenia, Projoenia.
        - Order Calonymphida Boscaro & Keeling 2024
          - Family Calonymphidae Grassi 1911 sensu Gile 2011, genera Calonympha, Criconympha, Daimonympha, Diplonympha, Gyronympha, Metastephanonympha, Prosnyderella, Snyderella, Stephanonympha.
          - Family Deltotrichonymphidae Brugerolle & Lee 2000, genera Deltotrichonympha, Koruga.
          - Family Mixotrichidae Boscaro & Keeling 2024, genus Mixotricha.
        - Order Devescovinida Boscaro & Keeling 2024, family Devescovinidae Doflein 1911 emend. Boscaro & Keeling 2024, genera Devescovina, Achemon, Astronympha, Bullanympha, Caduceia, Coronympha, Evemonia, Foaina, Hyperdevescovina, Kirbynia, Kofoidia, Macrotrichomonas, Macrotrichomonoides, Metadevescovina, Parajoenia, Polymastigoides, Pseudodevescovina, Runanympha, †Devescovites.
        - Order Gigantomonadida Boscaro & Keeling 2024, family Gigantomonadidae Boscaro & Keeling 2024, genus Gigantomonas.
      - Class Dientamoebea Boscaro & Keeling 2024, order Dientamoebida Boscaro & Keeling 2024, family Dientamoebidae Grassé 1953, genera Dientamoeba, Histomonas, Parahistomonas, Protrichomonas.
      - Class Monocercomonadea Boscaro & Keeling 2024, order Monocercomonadida Boscaro & Keeling 2024, family Monocercomonadidae Kirby 1944, genus Monocercomonas.
      - Class Simplicimonadea Boscaro & Keeling 2024, order Simplicimonadida Boscaro & Keeling 2024, family Simplicimonadidae Čepička, Hampl & Kulda 2010, genus Simplicimonas.
      - Class Tritrichomonadea Čepička, Hampl & Kulda 2010 emend. Boscaro & Keeling 2024, order Tritrichomonadida Čepička, Hampl & Kulda 2010 emend. Boscaro & Keeling 2024, family Tritrichomonadidae Čepička, Hampl & Kulda 2010, genus Tritrichomonas.
      - Class Spirotrichonymphea Grassé 1952 sensu Čepička, Hampl & Kulda 2010
        - Order Cononymphida Boscaro & Keeling 2024, family Cononymphidae Boscaro & Keeling 2024, genus Cononympha.
        - Order Holomastigotoidida Boscaro & Keeling 2024, family Holomastigotoididae Grassi & Foà 1911, genera Holomastigotoides, Rostronympha.
        - Order Spirotrichonymphida Grassé 1952
          - Family Brugerollinidae Boscaro & Keeling 2024, genera Brugerollina, Pseudospironympha.
          - Family Fraterculidae Boscaro & Keeling 2024, genera Fraterculus, Cuppa.
          - Family Holomastigotidae Janicki 1915, genera Holomastigotes, Spiromastigotes, Spirotrichonymphella, Uteronympha.
          - Family Spirotrichonymphidae Grassi 1917, genera Spirotrichonympha, Microjoenia, Micromastigotes, Nanospironympha, Spironympha, Torquenympha.
- Incertae sedis
  - Class Notopharyngea Shiratori et al. 2026 (=BaSk Williams et al. 2024)
    - Order Barthelonida Shiratori et al. 2026, family Barthelonidae Shiratori et al. 2026, genera Barthelona, Microbarthelona, Parabarthelona.
    - Order Skoliomonadida Shiratori, Eglit, Yazaki, Inagaki & Simpson 2026, family Skoliomonadidae Shiratori, Eglit, Yazaki, Inagaki & Simpson 2026, genus Skoliomonas.

=== Discoba ===
==== Jakobida ====
- Ophirinina Yabuki, Gyaltshen, Heiss & Kim 2018
  - Agogonidae Galindo, Prokina, Torruella, López-García & Moreira 2023. Agogonia.
  - Ophirinidae Yabuki, Gyaltshen, Heiss & Kim 2018. Ophirina.
- Andalucina Cavalier-Smith 2013
  - Andaluciidae Cavalier-Smith 2013. Andalucia.
  - Stygiellidae Pánek, Táborský & Čepička 2015. Stygiella, Velundella.
- Histionina Cavalier-Smith 2013. Histiona, Jakoba, Moramonas, Reclinomonas, Seculamonas nomen nudum.

==== Tsukubamonadida ====
- Tsukubamonas.

==== Heterolobosea ====
- - Pharyngomonadida
  - Tetramitia
    - Multisulcus
    - - Selenaionea
        - Neovahlkampfiida
        - Selenaionida
      - Eutetramitea
        - Naegleriida
        - - - - Percolomonadida
              - Pseudociliatida
            - Creneida
          - Lyromonadida

Cladogram of heterolobosean orders based on combined phylogenomic and 18S rRNA analyses published in 2025.

The phylum Heterolobosea contains around 170 species of amoebae, flagellates, and amoeboflagellates. It was initially established to unite two historically well-known amoeboid orders, Schizopyrenida (such as Naegleria fowleri, a human pathogen) and Acrasida (slime molds). Later, as more flagellates joined this grouping, the usage of Heterolobosea was split between two meanings: the more common usage applies to the entire clade, while the usage by Cavalier-Smith and collaborators was restricted to a paraphyletic class of "traditional" heteroloboseans, with the name Percolozoa used for the phylum instead. The first comprehensive phylogenomic study of Heterolobosea was published in 2025 by Tomáš Pánek and coauthors, resulting in its modern classification.

Phylum Heterolobosea Page & Blanton 1985 sensu Hanousková et al. 2019 (=Percolozoa Cavalier-Smith 1991)

- Subphylum Pharyngomonada Cavalier-Smith 2008
  - Class Pharyngomonadea Cavalier-Smith in Cavalier-Smith & Nikolaev 2008
    - Order Pharyngomonadida Cavalier-Smith in Cavalier-Smith & Nikolaev 2008
      - Family Pharyngomonadidae Cavalier-Smith in Cavalier-Smith & Nikolaev 2008, genus Pharyngomonas.
- Subphylum Tetramitia Cavalier-Smith 1993
  - Multisulcus malaysiensis Prokina et al. 2025, nom. prov.
  - Class Selenaionea Pánek & Čepička 2025
    - Order Neovahlkampfiida Cavalier-Smith 2022 emend. Pánek et al. 2025
      - Family Neovahlkampfiidae Hanousková et al. 2018, genus Neovahlkampfia.
      - Family Orodruinidae Shɨshkin 2021 (=Gruberellidae Page & Blanton 1985), genera Orodruina (=Gruberella), Mombasina.
    - Order Selenaionida Hanousková et al. 2018
      - Family Selenaionidae Hanousková et al. 2018, genus Selenaion.
  - Class Eutetramitea Pánek & Čepička 2025. Genera of uncertain position: Eltonia, Euplaesiobystra, Fumarolamoeba, Heteramoeba, Parafumarolamoeba, Paravahlkampfia, Oramoeba, Stachyamoeba, Vrihiamoeba.
    - Order Naegleriida Pánek & Čepička 2025 (=Heterolobosea sensu Cavalier-Smith 2022). Genera not assigned to any family: Aurem, Marinamoeba.
      - Family Acrasidae Poche 1913, genera Acrasis, Allovahlkampfia, Pocheina.
      - Family Naegleriidae Kudo 1954 emend. Pánek et al. 2025, genera Naegleria, Willaertia, Trimastigamoeba.
      - Family Tulamoebidae Kirby et al. 2015, genera Halosymphonia, Pleurostomum, Tulamoeba.
      - Family Vahlkampfiidae Jollos 1917 emend. Pánek et al. 2025, genera Tetramitus, Vahlkampfia, Pseudovahlkampfia, Tetramastigamoeba.
    - Order Percolomonadida Cavalier-Smith 1993
      - Family Barbeliidae Arndt 2023, genera Barbelia, Nonamonas.
      - Family Lulaidae Hohlfeld & Arndt 2023, genus Lula.
      - Family Percolomonadidae Cavalier-Smith 2003, genus Percolomonas.
    - Order Pseudociliatida Corliss & Lipscomb 1982
      - Family Stephanopogonidae Corliss 1961, genus Stephanopogon.
    - Order Creneida Cavalier-Smith 2022
      - Family Creneidae Pánek et al. 2014, genus Creneis.
    - Order Lyromonadida Cavalier-Smith 1993
      - Family Psalteriomonadidae Cavalier-Smith 1993, genera Harpagon, Psalteriomonas (incl. Sawyeria), Monopylocystis, Pseudoharpagon, Lyromonas.

==== Euglenozoa ====
The phylum Euglenozoa is home to at least 2,000 described species of single-celled flagellates of very dissimilar lifestyles. It was originally proposed to group the euglenids (such as the photosynthetic Euglena) and the kinetoplastids (like the pathogenic Trypanosoma), usually studied separatedly; eventually it included diplonemids and symbiontids as well. Due to its share of photosynthetic species, traditionally regarded as algae, the phylum is also known as Euglenophyta by phycologists, and euglenids in particular were often studied as algae. Euglenids and kinetoplastids are the most diverse in terms of described species, although diplonemids may compose over 67,000 potential species. The classification of euglenozoans was summarized by Cavalier-Smith in 2016. A more phylogenetically precise revision of their classification was published in 2021 by Alexei Kostygov and coauthors, with newer clades and genera described in the following years, particularly of euglenids. Still, one group of euglenids, the paraphyletic "ploeotids", remains unresolved in the current classification, spread out across multiple clades.

Phylum Euglenozoa (Euglenophyta) Cavalier-Smith 1981 emend. Simpson 1997

- Class Euglenida Bütschli 1884 emend. Simpson 1997 (=Euglenoida Bütschli 1884 emend. Cavalier-Smith 1993). Genera not assigned to any lower clade: †Moyeria, Entosiphon. Genera incertae sedis: Gaulosia, Parastasiella, Dinemula, Paradinemula, Mononema, Ovicola, Embryocola, Copromonas.
  - Order Petalomonadida Cavalier-Smith 1993
    - Family Scytomonadidae Stein 1878, genera Atraktomonas, Michajlowastasia, Biundula, Calycimonas, Dolium, Dylakosoma, Notosolenus, Pentamonas, Petalomonas^{(P)}, Scytomonas, Tonotosolenus, Tropidoscyphus, Unotosolenus.
    - Family Sphenomonadidae Kent 1880, genus Sphenomonas.
  - Alistosa Lax & Simpson 2021. Genera not assigned to any family: Keelungia, Lentomonas, Decastava, Hokulea.
    - Family Ploeotiidae Cavalier-Smith 2016, genera Ploeotia and Serpenomonas.
  - Karavia Lax, Cho & Keeling 2023, genera Hemiolia, Liburna.
  - Olkaspira Lax & Simpson 2021. Genera not assigned to any lower clade: Chelandium, Olkasia.
    - Spirocuta Cavalier-Smith, Chao & Vickerman 2016 (=Helicales Perschke et al. 2017). Genus incertae sedis: Heteronema.
      - Anisonemia Cavalier-Smith 2016
        - Order Anisonemida Cavalier-Smith 2016, family Anisonemidae Kent 1880 emend. Cavalier-Smith 2016, genera Anisonema, Dinema (=Dinematomonas).
        - Order Natomonadida Cavalier-Smith 2016
          - Suborder Metanemina, Cavalier-Smith 2016, family Neometanemidae Cavalier-Smith 2016, genus Neometanema.
          - Aphagea Cavalier-Smith 1993 emend. Busse & Preisfeld 2003 (=Rhabdomonadina Leedale 1967 emend. Cavalier-Smith 1993)
            - Family Astasiidae Kent 1884, genera Astasia, Gyropaigne, Menoidium, Parmidium, Rhabdomonas.
            - Family Distigmidae Hollande 1942, genus Distigma.
      - Order Peranemida (Peranematales) Cavalier-Smith 1993, family Peranemidae (Peranemataceae) Bütschli 1884, genera Chasmostoma, Jenningsia (=Peranemopsis), Peranema, Urceolus (=Urceolopsis, Phialonema).
      - Euglenophyceae Schoenichen in Eyfurth & Shoenichen 1925, emend. Marin & Melkonian 2003 (=Euglenea Butschli 1884, emend. Busse & Preisfeld 2002). Genera incertae sedis: Ascoglena, Euglenamorpha, Euglenopsis, Glenoclosterium, Hegneria, Klebsina, Euglenocapsa.
        - Order Rapazida Cavalier-Smith 2016, family Rapazidae Cavalier-Smith 2016, genus Rapaza.
        - Subclass Euglenophycidae Busse & Preisfeld, 2003
          - Order Eutreptiales (Eutreptiida) Leedale 1967 emend. Marin & Melkonian 2003, family Eutreptiaceae (Eutreptiidae) Hollande 1942, genera Eutreptia, Eutreptiella^{(P)}.
          - Order Euglenales (Euglenida) Leedale 1967 emend. Marin & Melkonian 2003
            - Family Phacaceae (Phacidae) Kim et al. 2010, genera Discoplastis, Flexiglena, Lepocinclis, Phacus.
            - Family Euglenaceae (Euglenidae) Dujardin 1841, emend. Kim et al. 2010, genera Colacium, Cryptoglena, Euglena, Euglenaformis, Euglenaria, Monomorphina, Strombomonas, Trachelomonas.
      - Subclass Acroglissia Cavalier-Smith 2016, order Acroglissida Cavalier-Smith 2016, family Teloproctidae Cavalier-Smith in Cavalier-Smith et al. 2016, genus Teloprocta.
- Class Symbiontida Yubuki et al. 2009 (=Postgaardea Cavalier-Smith, 1998)
  - Order Postgaardida Cavalier-Smith 2003
    - Family Postgaardidae Cavalier-Smith 2016, genus Postgaardi.
    - Family Calkinsiidae Cavalier-Smith 2016, genus Calkinsia.
  - Order Bihospitida Cavalier-Smith 2016, family Bihospitidae Cavalier-Smith 2016, genus Bihospites.
- Subphylum Glycomonada Cavalier-Smith 2016
  - Class Diplonemea Cavalier-Smith 1993, order Diplonemida Cavalier-Smith 1993
    - Family Diplonemidae Cavalier-Smith 1993 emend. Adl et al. 2019, genera Diplonema, Rhynchopus, Lacrimia, Sulcionema, Flectonema.
    - Family Hemistasiidae Cavalier-Smith 2016 emend. Adl et al. 2019, genera Hemistasia, Namystinia, Artemidia.
    - Family Eupelagonemidae Okamoto & Keeling 2018, genus Eupelagonema.
  - Class Kinetoplastea Honigberg 1963 emend. Vickerman 1976. Genera incertae sedis: Bordnamonas, Cephalothamnium, Desmomonas, Jarrellia, Lamellasoma.
    - Subclass Prokinetoplastina Vickerman in Moreira et al. 2004, order Prokinetoplastida Vickerman in Moreira et al. 2004
      - Family Ichthyobodonidae Isaksen et al. 2007, genus Ichthyobodo.
      - Family Perkinselidae Kostygov in Kostygov et al. 2021, genus Perkinsela (="Perkinsiella", Hollandeia).
    - Subclass Metakinetoplastina Vickerman in Moreira et al. 2004
      - Order Neobodonida Vickerman in Moreira et al. 2004
        - Suborder Neobodonina Cavalier-Smith 2016
          - Family Neobodonidae^{(P?)} Cavalier-Smith 2016, genera Actuariola, Avlakibodo, Azumiobodo, Cruzella, Cryptaulaxella, Klosteria, Neobodo, Phanerobia, Rhynchobodo.
          - Family Rhynchomonadidae Cavalier-Smith 2016, genera Dimastigella, Rhynchomonas.
        - Family Allobodonidae Goodwin et al. 2018, genera Allobodo, Novijibodo.
      - Order Parabodonida Vickerman in Moreira et al. 2004
        - Family Cryptobiidae Poche 1911 emend. Kostygov in Kostygov et al. 2021, genera Cryptobia, Parabodo.
        - Family Trypanoplasmatidae Hartmann & Chagas 1910 emend. Kostygov in Kostygov et al. 2021, genera Procryptobia, Trypanoplasma.
      - Order Eubodonida Vickerman in Moreira et al. 2004, family Bodonidae Bütschli 1883, genus Bodo.
      - Order Trypanosomatida Kent 1880 emend. Vickerman in Moreira et al. 2004, family Trypanosomatidae Dolfein 1901. Genera not assigned to subfamilies: Jaenimonas, Vickermania, Sergeia, Wallacemonas. Genera incertae sedis: Cercoplasma, Malacozoomonas, Nematodomonas, Rhynchoidomonas, †Paleoleishmania G.Poinar & R.Poinar 2004.
        - Subfamily Trypanosomatinae Doflein 1901, genus Trypanosoma.
        - Subfamily Leishmaniinae Maslov & Lukeš 2012
          - Infrafamily Crithidiatae Kostygov & Yurchenko 2017, genera Leptomonas, Crithidia, Lotmaria.
          - Infrafamily Leishmaniatae Maslov & Lukeš 2012, genera Leishmania, Porcisia, Endotrypanum, Novymonas Zelonia, Borovskyia.
        - Subfamily Herpetomonadinae Alexeieff 1911 stat. nov., emend. Kostygov & Yurchenko in Kostygov et al. 2021 (=Phytomonadinae Yurchenko, Kostygov, Votýpka & Lukeš 2015), genera Herpetomonas, Lafontella, Phytomonas.
        - Subfamily Strigomonadinae Votýpka et al. 2014, genera Angomonas, Strigomonas, Kentomonas.
        - Subfamily Blastocrithidiinae Votýpka, Yurchenko & Lukeš 2021, genera Blastocrithidia, Obscuromonas.
        - Subfamily Blechomonadinae Votýpka & Suková 2013, genus Blechomonas.
        - Subfamily Paratrypanosomatinae Votýpka & Lukeš 2013, genus Paratrypanosoma.

== Minor clades ==
=== Ancyromonadida ===
- Incertae sedis genus: Divimonas Barkhouse, Eglit, Weston & Simpson 2025
- Family Ancyromonadidae Cavalier-Smith 2008, genera Ancyromonas, Nutomonas.
- Family Planomonadidae Cavalier-Smith 1993, genera Fabomonas, Planomonas.

=== CRuMs ===
- Family Collodictyonidae: Collodictyon Carter 1865, Diphylleia Massart 1920 [Aulacomonas Skuja 1939], Sulcomonas Brugerolle 2006.
- Class Hilomonadea Cavalier-Smith 2008 emend. 2012 → order Rigifilida Cavalier-Smith in Yabuki et al. 2012 [Micronucleariida Cavalier-Smith 2008].
  - Family Micronucleariidae Cavalier-Smith 2008, genus Micronuclearia Mikrjukov & Mylnikov 2001.
  - Family Rigifilidae Yabuki & Cavalier-Smith in Yabuki et al. 2012 genus Rigifila Yabuki & Cavalier-Smith 2012.
- Class Glissodiscea Cavalier-Smith 2013 emend. 2021 → order Mantamonadida Cavalier-Smith in Glücksman et al. 2011 → family Mantamonadidae Cavalier-Smith in Glücksman et al. 2011, genus Mantamonas Glücksman & Cavalier-Smith 2011.
- Order Glissandrida Yazaki et al. 2025 → family Glissandridae Yazaki et al. 2025, genus Glissandra Patterson and Simpson 1996

=== Telonemia ===
The phylum Telonemia (telonemids) contains a few species of flagellates found in ocean and fresh waters worldwide. It was originally proposed in 2006 for Telonema, a genus of previously uncertain affinity. Under the Cavalier-Smith system, telonemids were initially classified as a class of Cryptista, but later analyses consistently recovered it as a separate group. Until 2019, only two species had been formally described, each belonging to a separate genus, but environmental DNA sequencing suggested there were many more species not yet described. Between 2022 and 2025, eight additional species were described along with three new genera, bringing the total number of species to ten.

- Phylum Telonemia Shalchian-Tabrizi 2006, class Telonemea Cavalier-Smith 1993, order Telonemida Cavalier-Smith 1993, family Telonemidae Cavalier-Smith 1993, genera Arpakorses, Lateronema, Hyaloria, Microkorses, Telonema.

== Protists of uncertain affiliation ==
- Family Acinetactidae Stokes 1886, genus Acinetactis.
- Genera Actinocoma, Actinolophus, Adinomonas, Aletium, Amphimonas, Amylophagus, Aphelidiopsis, Asterocaelum, Asthmatos, Aurospora, Barbetia, Berkeleyaesol, Belaria, Belonocystis, Bertarellia, Bertramia, Bodopsis, Boekelovia, Boveemonas, Branchipocola, Camptoptyche, Chalarodora, Cibdelia, Cichkovia, Cinetidomyxa, Cingula, Cladomonas, Clathrella, Codonoeca, Coelosporidium, (Note: Probably a synonym of the zygomycete fungus Nephridiophaga.) Copromonas, Cyanomastix, Cyclomonas, Cytamoeba, Dallingeria, Dictyomyxa, Dimastigamoeba, "Dimorpha", Dinemula, Dinoasteromonas, Diplocalium, Diplomita, Diplophysalis, Diploselmis, Dobellina, Ducelleria, Ectobiella, Elaeorhanis, Embryocola, Endemosarca, Endobiella, Endomonas, Endospora, Enteromyxa, Eperythrocytozoon, Errera, Fromentella, Gweamonas, Gymnococcus, Gymnophrydium, Haematotractidium, Hartmannina, Heliobodo, Heliomonas, Heterogromia, Hillea, Hyalodaktylethra, Immanoplasma, Isoselmis, Janickina, Kamera, Lagenidiopsis, Liegeosia, Luffisphaera, (Note: May be the same genus as Belonocystis.) Lymphocytozoon, Lymphosporidium, Macappella, Magosphaera, Malpighiella, Martineziella, Megamoebomyxa, Microcometes, Monochrysis, Monodus, Mononema, Myrmicisporidium, Naupliicola, Nephrodinium, Neurosporidium, Orbulinella, Ovicola, Palisporomonas, Pansporella, Paradinemula, Paraluffisphaera, Paramonas, Paraplasma, Parastasia, Parastasiella, Peliainia, Peltomonas, Petasaria, Phagodinium, Phanerobia, Phloxamoeba, Phyllomitus, Phyllomonas, Physcosporidium, Pleuophrys, Pleuromastix, Protenterospora, Protomonas, Pseudoactiniscus, Pseudodimorpha, Pseudosporopsis, Rhizomonas, Rhynchodinium, Rigidomastix, Schewiakoffia, Sergentella, Sphaerasuctans, Spongastericus, Spongocyclia, Stephanomonas, Strobilomonas, Thaulirens, Tetradimorpha, Topsentella, Toshiba, Trichonema, Urbanella.
- Species "Dimorpha" salina.

Incertae sedis within Diaphoretickes:

- Genus Valkomonas.

Incertae sedis within SAR:

- Genus Labyrinthomyxa.

== See also ==
- Cavalier-Smith's system of classification
- Protist
- Protists in the fossil record
