= Taxonomy of diatoms =

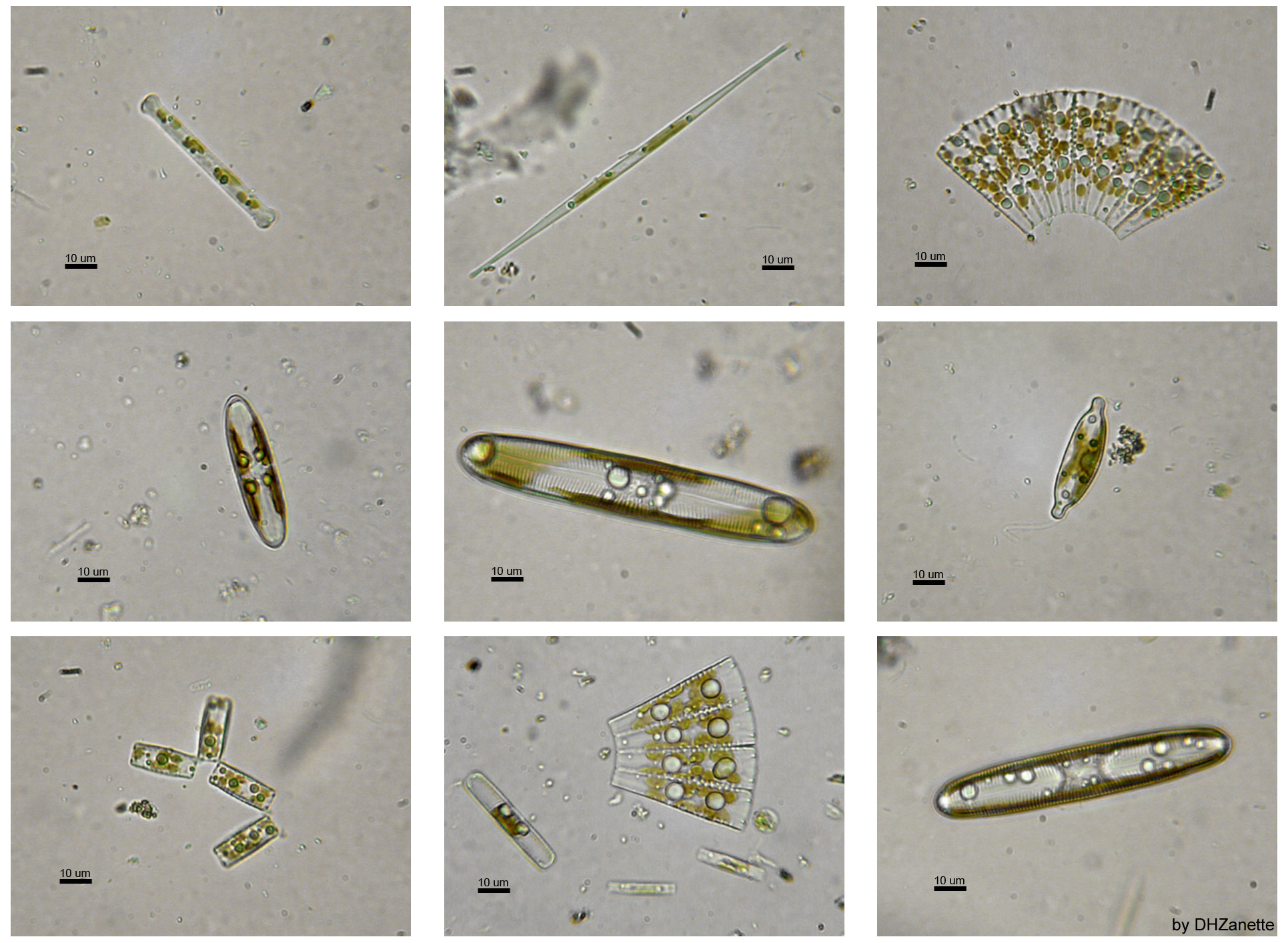
Light microscopy of several species of living freshwater diatoms

Diatoms belong to a large group called the heterokonts, which include both autotrophs such as golden algae and kelp; and heterotrophs such as water moulds. The classification of heterokonts is still unsettled: they may be designated a division, phylum, kingdom, or something intermediate to those. Consequently, diatoms are ranked anywhere from a class, usually called Diatomophyceae or Bacillariophyceae, to a division (=phylum), usually called Bacillariophyta, with corresponding changes in the ranks of their subgroups.

== Genera and species ==
An estimated 20,000 extant diatom species are believed to exist, of which around 12,000 have been named to date according to Guiry, 2012 (other sources give a wider range of estimates). Around 1,000-1,300 diatom genera have been described, both extant and fossil, of which some 250-300 exist only as fossils.

== Classes and orders ==
=== Overview ===
For many years the diatoms—treated either as a class (Bacillariophyceae) or a phylum (Bacillariophyta)—were divided into just 2 orders, corresponding to the centric and the pennate diatoms (Centrales and Pennales; alternative names Biddulphiales and Bacillariales, as used e.g. in Lee, 1989). This classification was extensively overhauled by Round, Crawford and Mann in 1990 who treated the diatoms at a higher rank (division, corresponding to phylum in zoological classification), and promoted the major classification units to classes, maintaining the centric diatoms as a single class Coscinodiscophyceae, but splitting the former pennate diatoms into 2 separate classes, Fragilariophyceae and Bacillariophyceae (the latter older name retained but with an emended definition), between them encompassing 45 orders, the majority of them new.

Today (writing at mid 2020) it is recognised that the 1990 system of Round et al. is in need of revision with the advent of newer molecular work, however the best system to replace it is unclear, and current systems in widespread use such as AlgaeBase, the World Register of Marine Species and its contributing database DiatomBase, and the system for "all life" represented in Ruggiero et al., 2015, all retain the Round et al. treatment as their basis, albeit with diatoms as a whole treated as a class rather than division/phylum, and Round et al.'s classes reduced to subclasses, for better agreement with the treatment of phylogenetically adjacent groups and their containing taxa. (For references refer the individual sections below).

One proposal, by Linda Medlin and co-workers commencing in 2004, is for some of the centric diatom orders considered more closely related to the pennates to be split off as a new class, Mediophyceae, itself more closely aligned with the pennate diatoms than the remaining centrics. This hypothesis—later designated the Coscinodiscophyceae-Mediophyceae-Bacillariophyceae, or Coscinodiscophyceae+(Mediophyceae+Bacillariophyceae) (CMB) hypothesis—has been accepted by D.G. Mann among others, who uses it as the basis for the classification of diatoms as presented in Adl. et al.'s series of syntheses (2005, 2012, 2019), and also in the Bacillariophyta chapter of the 2017 Handbook of the Protists edited by Archibald et al., with some modifications reflecting the apparent non-monophyly of Medlin et al. original "Coscinodiscophyceae". Meanwhile, a group led by E.C. Theriot favours a different hypothesis of phylogeny, which has been termed the structural gradation hypothesis (SGH) and does not recognise the Mediophyceae as a monophyletic group, while another analysis, that of Parks et al., 2018, finds that the radial centric diatoms (Medlin et al.'s Coscinodiscophyceae) are not monophyletic, but supports the monophyly of Mediophyceae minus Attheya, which is an anomalous genus. Discussion of the relative merits of these conflicting schemes continues by the various parties involved.

=== Round et al., 1990 ===
Based on the fact that pennate diatoms either do or do not have a longitudinal groove in the valve, called a raphe, a 1990 classification by Round, Crawford & Mann divides the diatoms (as Bacillarophyta) into three classes, centric (22 orders); pennate without a raphe (12 orders); and pennate with a raphe (11 orders), as follows:

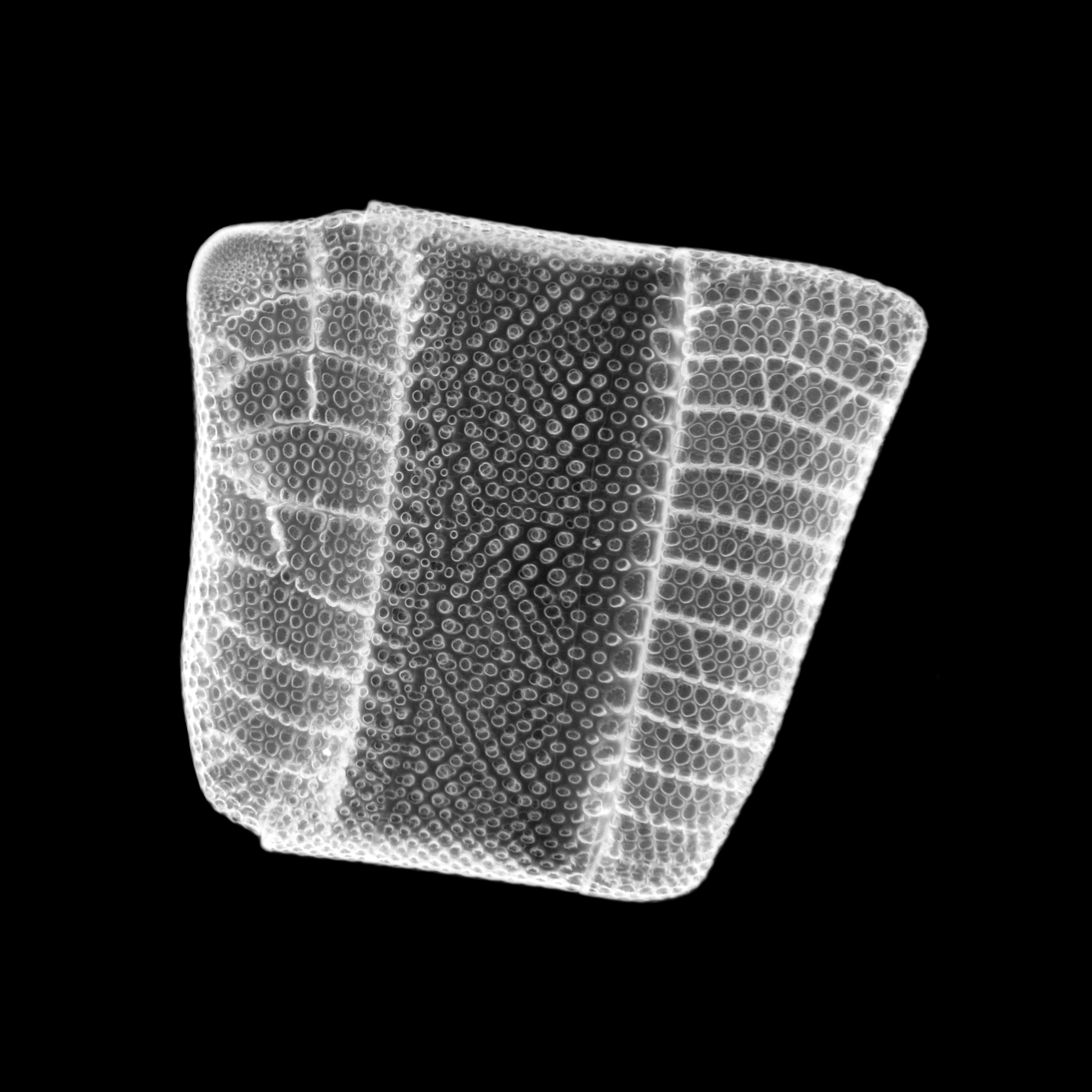
Coscinodiscophyceae Isthmia nervosaIsthmia nervosa

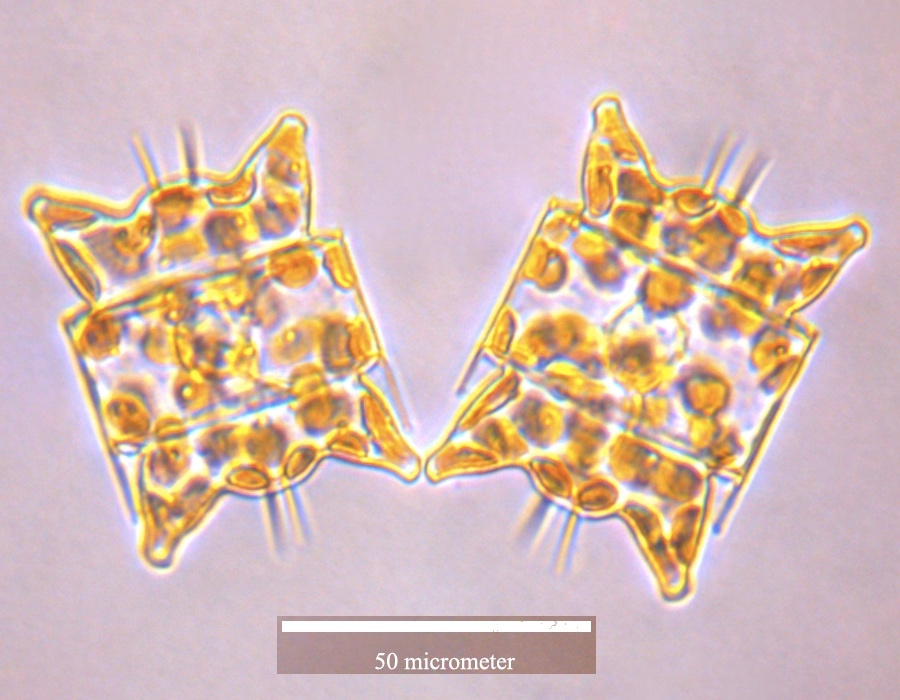
Coscinodiscophyceae Odontella aurita

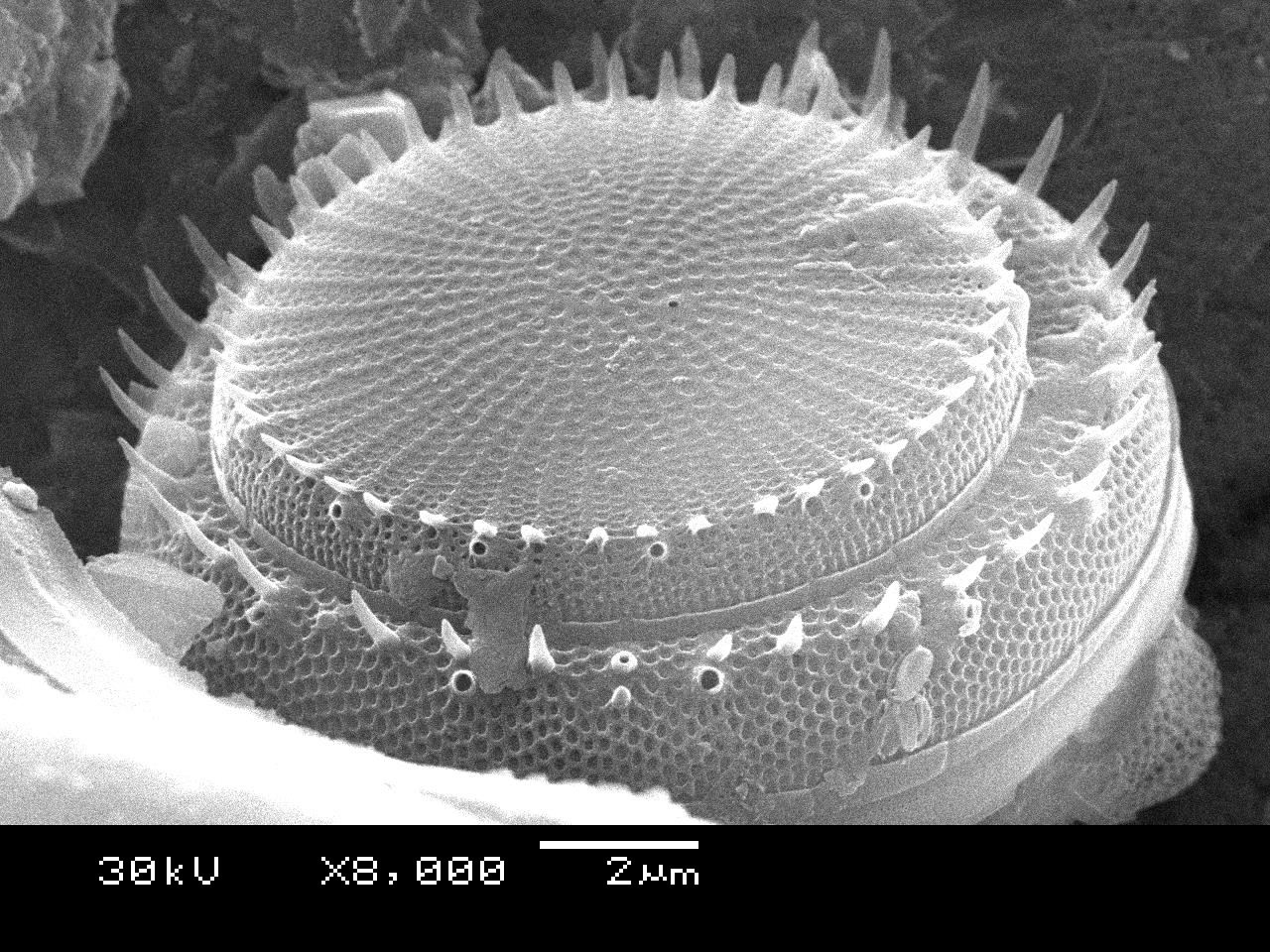
Thalassiosirales Stephanodiscus hantzschii

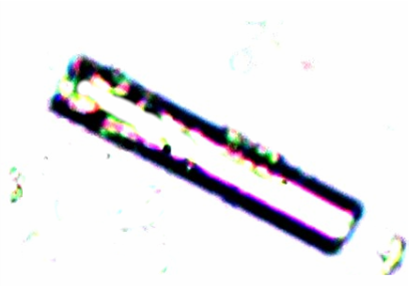
Fragilaria through the microscope

- Phylum Bacillarophyta (diatoms)

- Class Coscinodiscophyceae Round & R.M.Crawford (centric diatoms)

- Subclass Biddulphiophycidae Round & R.M.Crawford

- Anaulales Round & R.M.Crawford
- Biddulphiales Krieger
- Hemiaulales Round & R.M.Crawford
- Triceratiales Round & R.M.Crawford

- Subclass Chaetocerotophycidae Round & R.M.Crawford

- Chaetocerotales Round & R.M.Crawford
- Leptocylindrales Round & R.M.Crawford

- Subclass Corethrophycidae Round & R.M.Crawford

- Corethrales Round & R.M.Crawford

- Subclass Coscinodiscophycidae Round & R.M.Crawford

- Arachnoidiscales Round
- Asterolamprales Round
- Aulacoseirales R.M.Crawford
- Chrysanthemodiscales Round
- Coscinodiscales Round
- Ethmodiscales Round
- Melosirales R.M.Crawford
- Orthoseirales R.M.Crawford
- Paraliales R.M.Crawford
- Stictocyclales Round
- Stictodiscales Round & R.M.Crawford

- Subclass Cymatosirophycidae Round & R.M.Crawford

- Cymatosirales Round & R.M.Crawford

- Subclass Lithodesmiophycidae Round & R.M.Crawford

- Lithodesmiales Round & R.M.Crawford

- Subclass Rhizosoleniophycidae Round & R.M.Crawford

- Rhizosoleniales Silva

- Subclass Thalassiosirophycidae Round & R.M.Crawford

- Thalassiosirales Glezer & Makarova

- Class Fragilariophyceae Round (pennate diatoms without a raphe (araphids))

- Subclass Fragilariophycidae Round

- Ardissoneales Round
- Climacospheniales Round
- Cyclophorales Round & R.M.Crawford
- Fragilariales P.C.Silva
- Licmophorales Round
- Protoraphidales Round
- Rhabdonematales Round & R.M.Crawford
- Rhaphoneidales Round
- Striatellales Round
- Tabellariales Round
- Thalassionematales Round
- Toxariales Round

- Class Bacillariophyceae Haeckel, 1878, emend. D.G.Mann (pennate diatoms with a raphe (raphids))

- Subclass Bacillariophycidae D.G.Mann

- Achnanthales P.C.Silva
- Bacillariales Hendey
- Cymbellales D.G.Mann
- Dictyoneidales D.G.Mann
- Lyrellales D.G.Mann
- Mastogloiales D.G.Mann
- Naviculales Bessey
- Rhopalodiales D.G.Mann
- Surirellales D.G.Mann
- Thalassiophysales D.G.Mann

- Subclass Eunotiophycidae D.G.Mann

- Eunotiales P.C.Silva

=== Medlin & Kaczmarska, 2004 ===
An alternate classification for the diatoms based on molecular phylogeny was proposed by Medlin & Kaczmarska in 2004, as follows. Medlin and co-workers erected a new class, Mediophyceae (which could be re-ranked a subclass if diatoms as a whole are ranked as a class rather than a phylum) for the "polar centric" diatoms, which they consider to be more closely related to the pennate rather than to other centric diatoms, a concept which has been followed or further adapted by some (e.g. Adl et al., 2019, see below), but not all subsequent workers at this time.

- Phylum Bacillariophyta (diatoms)

- Subphylum Coscinodiscophytina

- Class Coscinodiscophyceae ("radial centrics")

- Arachnoidiscales
- Asterolamprales
- Aulacoseirales
- Corethrales
- Coscinodiscales
- Chrysanthemodiscales
- Ethmodiscales
- Leptocylindrales
- Melosirales
- Orthoseirales
- Rhizosoleniales
- Stictocyclales
- Stictodiscales

- Subphylum Bacillariophytina

- Class Mediophyceae ("polar centrics")

- Ardissoneales
- Biddulphiales
- Chaetocerotales
- Cymatosirales
- Hemiaulales
- Lithodesmiales
- Thalassiosirales
- Toxariales
- Triceratiales

- Class Bacillariophyceae (pennate diatoms)

- Achnanthales
- Bacillariales
- Cymbellales
- Dictyoneidales
- Eunotiales
- Fragilariales
- Licmophorales
- Lyrellales
- Mastogloiales
- Naviculales
- Rhabdonematales
- Rhaphoneidales
- Rhopalodiales
- Surirellales
- Tabellariales
- Thalassionematales
- Thalassiophysales

=== Ruggiero et al., 2015 ===
In the treatment for "all life" (down to order, extant taxa only) by Ruggiero et al., 2015, the diatoms are treated as follows. This treatment largely reflects that used by Algaebase as of 2015, and is also reflected in the current (mid 2020) treatment used in DiatomBase, the World Register of Marine Species (WoRMS) of which DiatomBase is a part, and the Catalogue of Life. This treatment is identical to that of Round et al., 1990, except that all diatoms are treated as a single class, Round et al.'s classes are reduced to subclasses, and the latter's original subclasses are omitted.

- Superphylum Heterokonta (heterokonts: Ochrophyta plus other phyla))

- Phylum Ochrophyta (diatoms plus other classes)

- Class Bacillariophyceae (diatoms)

- Subclass Bacillariophycidae

- Achnanthales
- Bacillariales
- Cymbellales
- Dictyoneidales
- Eunotiales
- Lyrellales
- Mastogloiales
- Naviculales
- Rhopalodiales
- Surirellales
- Thalassiophysales

- Subclass Coscinodiscophycidae

- Anaulales
- Arachnoidiscales
- Asterolamprales
- Aulacoseirales
- Biddulphiales
- Chaetocerotales
- Chrysanthemodiscales
- Corethrales
- Coscinodiscales
- Cymatosirales
- Ethmodiscales
- Hemiaulales
- Leptocylindrales
- Lithodesmiales
- Melosirales
- Orthoseirales
- Paraliales
- Rhizosoleniales
- Stictocyclales
- Stictodiscales
- Thalassiosirales
- Triceratiales

- Subclass Fragilariophycidae

- Ardissoneales
- Climacospheniales
- Cyclophorales
- Fragilariales
- Licmophorales
- Protoraphidales
- Rhabdonematales
- Rhaphoneidales
- Striatellales
- Tabellariales
- Thalassionematales
- Toxariales

=== Adl et al., 2019 ===
Following earlier versions in the treatments of Adl et al. 2005 and 2012, D.G. Mann, in Adl et al. 2019, presented his most recent classification of diatoms as follows, while noting: "This revision reflects numerous advances in the phylogeny of the diatoms over the last decade. Due to our poor taxon sampling outside of the Mediophyceae and pennate diatoms, and the known and anticipated diversity of all diatoms, many clades appear at a high classification level (and the higher level classification is rather flat)." This classification treats diatoms as a phylum (Diatomeae/Bacillariophyta), accepts the class Mediophyceae of Medlin and co-workers, introduces new subphyla and classes for a number of otherwise isolated genera, and re-ranks a number of previously established taxa as subclasses, but does not list orders or families. Inferred ranks have been added for clarity (Adl. et al. do not use ranks, but the intended ones in this portion of the classification are apparent from the choice of endings used, within the system of botanical nomenclature employed).

- Clade Diatomista Derelle et al. 2016, emend. Cavalier-Smith 2017 (diatoms plus a subset of other ochrophyte groups)

- Phylum Diatomeae Dumortier 1821 [= Bacillariophyta Haeckel 1878] (diatoms)

- Subphylum Leptocylindrophytina D.G. Mann in Adl et al. 2019

- Class Leptocylindrophyceae D.G. Mann in Adl et al. 2019 (Leptocylindrus, Tenuicylindrus)
- Class Corethrophyceae D.G. Mann in Adl et al. 2019 (Corethron)

- Subphylum Ellerbeckiophytina D.G. Mann in Adl et al. 2019 (Ellerbeckia)
- Subphylum Probosciophytina D.G. Mann in Adl et al. 2019 (Proboscia)
- Subphylum Melosirophytina D.G. Mann in Adl et al. 2019 (Aulacoseira, Melosira, Hyalodiscus, Stephanopyxis, Paralia, Endictya)
- Subphylum Coscinodiscophytina Medlin & Kaczmarska 2004, emend. (Actinoptychus, Coscinodiscus, Actinocyclus, Asteromphalus, Aulacodiscus, Stellarima)
- Subphylum Rhizosoleniophytina D.G. Mann in Adl et al. 2019 (Guinardia, Rhizosolenia, Pseudosolenia)
- Subphylum Arachnoidiscophytina D.G. Mann in Adl et al. 2019 (Arachnoidiscus)
- Subphylum Bacillariophytina Medlin & Kaczmarska 2004, emend.

- Class Mediophyceae Jouse & Proshkina-Lavrenko in Medlin & Kaczmarska 2004

- Subclass Chaetocerotophycidae Round & R.M. Crawford in Round et al. 1990, emend. (Chaetoceros, Bacteriastrum, Dactyliosolen, Cerataulina, Hemiaulus, Eucampia, Acanthoceras, Urosolenia, Terpsinoë, Hydrosera)
- Subclass Lithodesmiophycidae Round & R.M. Crawford in Round et al. 1990, emend. (Lithodesmium, Lithodesmioides, Helicotheca, Bellerochea, Ditylum)
- Subclass Thalassiosirophycidae Round & R.M. Crawford in Round et al. 1990 (Thalassiosira, Lindavia, Cyclotella, Stephanodiscus, Cyclostephanos, Discostella, Bacteriosira, Skeletonema, Detonula)
- Subclass Cymatosirophycidae Round & R.M. Crawford in Round et al. 1990 (Cymatosira, Minutocellus, Papiliocellulus, Leyanella, Extubocellulus, Plagiogrammopsis, Campylosira, Brockmanniella, Pierrecomperia)
- Subclass Odontellophycidae D.G. Mann in Adl et al. 2019 (Odontella, Triceratium, Cerataulus, Pleurosira, Pseudauliscus, Amphitetras, Trieres, Mastodiscus)
- Subclass Chrysanthemodiscophycidae D.G. Mann in Adl et al. 2019 (Chrysanthemodiscus, Biddulphiopsis, Trigonium, Isthmia, Lampriscus, Stictocyclus, Ardissonea, Climacosphenia, Toxarium)

- Class Biddulphiophyceae D.G. Mann in Adl et al. 2019

- Subclass Biddulphiophycidae Round and R.M. Crawford in Round et al. 1990, emend. (Biddulphia)
- Biddulphiophyceae incertae sedis (Attheya)

- Class Bacillariophyceae Haeckel 1878, emend.

- Family Striatellaceae (Striatella, Pseudostriatella)
- Subclass Urneidophycidae Medlin 2016 (Plagiogramma, Dimeregramma, Rhaphoneis, Delphineis, Psammoneis, Bleakeleya, Asterionellopsis)
- Subclass Fragilariophycidae Round in Round, Crawford & Mann 1990, emend. (Fragilaria, Synedra, Tabellaria, Asterionella, Diatoma, Tabularia, Cyclophora', Astrosyne, Licmophora, Rhabdonema, Grammatophora, Staurosira, Thalassionema)
- Subclass Bacillariophycidae D.G. Mann in Round, Crawford & Mann 1990, emend. (Eunotia, Achnanthes, Bacillaria, Nitzschia, Pseudo-nitzschia, Cylindrotheca, Navicula, Seminavis, Haslea, Stauroneis, Pleurosigma, Gyrosigma, Achnanthidium, Cocconeis, Frustulia, Diploneis, Sellaphora, Pinnularia, Gomphonema, Cymbella, Didymosphenia, Phaeodactylum, Amphora, Entomoneis, Epithemia, Surirella)

=== Others ===
Another systematic approach to classification was proposed in 1995, the Hoek, Mann and Jahns system. Previous versions of the Adl et al., 2019 classification appeared in Adl et al. 2005 and Adl et al. 2012, also in the chapter "Bacillariophyta" by Mann, Crawford & Round in the 2017 Handbook of the Protists edited by Archibald et al., in which some groups later named as formal taxa are listed under informal names (leptocylindrids, corethrids, melosirids, etc.).
