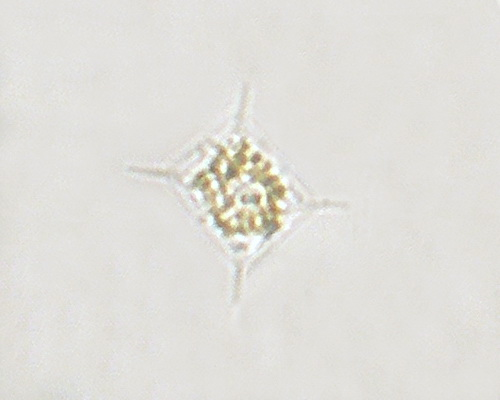

Scientific classification
- Domain: Eukaryota
- Clade: Diaphoretickes
- Clade: Sar
- Clade: Stramenopiles
- Phylum: Gyrista
- Subphylum: Ochrophytina
- Class: Bacillariophyceae
- Order: incertae sedis
- Family: Attheyaceae
- Genus: Attheya
- Species: A. decora

Binomial name
- Attheya decora (T.West, 1860)

= Attheya decora =

Species of single-celled organism

Attheya decora is a microscopic organism first discovered in 1860 on sandy beaches in northeastern England. It belongs to a group of water-dwelling microorganisms called diatoms, which are characterised by their transparent, glass-like shells made of silica. This tiny organism has a distinctive rectangular shape with four short horn-like projections extending from its corners, giving it a star-like appearance when viewed from above. Its name honours Thomas Atthey, a British naturalist who studied diatoms, while decora refers to its decorated or adorned appearance. Attheya decora typically forms brownish patches on sandy shorelines, particularly in areas where freshwater meets the sea, and is most abundant during spring. Scientists have noted its unusual ability to firmly attach to sand grains and its distinctive reproductive cycle, which differs from many related species.

== Taxonomy ==
Attheya decora was first described by William West in 1860 from sandy intertidal shores at Cresswell and Druridge Bay in Northumberland on the northeast coast of England. The genus name honours Thomas Atthey, a British naturalist and diatomist, while the specific epithet decora refers to its "decorated" or adorned appearance.

The taxonomic position of A. decora has been subject to various interpretations over time. Franz Schütt (1895) placed it in the Eucampiinae within the Biddulphieae, while Friedrich Hustedt (1930) classified it within the Biddulphieae. Rolf Simonsen (1979) recognised similar affinities and placed it in the family Biddulphiaceae.

More recently, Gerhard Drebes (1977) assigned Attheya to the Eupodiscaceae based on similarities in sexual reproduction patterns. In 1990, Frank Round and colleagues proposed the family Attheyaceae for Attheya alone, classifying it alongside the families Acanthocerotaceae and Chaetocerotaceae within the order Chaetocerotales.

Henri Peragallo (1897–1908) described two varieties of A. decora: var. hyalina and var. minuta, though these are now generally considered synonyms of the nominate form.

== Description ==
Attheya decora cells are readily recognisable in light microscopy by their rectangular shape in girdle view, measuring 18–22 micrometres (μm) in length. The most distinctive features include:

- Four short horns that project from the corners of the valve at angles that bisect the corner, giving the cell a star-like appearance when viewed from the valve face
- Six to nine radially arranged plastids (chloroplasts) with pyrenoids (structures involved in carbon fixation) at their inner ends
- A central cell nucleus
- An unusual cytoplasmic organisation where the cell contents do not fill the entire frustule (silica cell wall) but retract from specific areas, remaining attached at only seven places: at the centre of each valve face in the region of the rimoportula (a specialised opening), at the horns, and at the central cylinder of the girdle

The oval valve face consists of a central dumb-bell shaped area with distinct pores, surrounded by radiating ribs. A rimoportula is positioned halfway along the valve face but offset from the centre. The radiating ribs project at the valve poles into the bases of the horns as strips.

The horn structure is complex, composed of loops and strips emanating from the valve face. Towards the upper half of each horn, the strips appear to be made up of overlapping units, while the horn apex is perforate (has small openings). The cingulum (girdle) comprises many bands that are perforated only towards their open ends and near the ligula (a tongue-like extension). During cell division, the horns of the new valves fold within the girdle prior to the separation of the two sibling cells.

== Habitat and distribution ==
Attheya decora is primarily found on sandy intertidal shores, often appearing as brownish patches on the sand. It has been reported from similar habitats at various localities in Europe, including the east coast of Scotland (Aberdeen and Stonehaven) and brackish situations on the coast of Rhode Island, United States.

While some reports suggest A. decora can be found in inshore plankton, it is generally considered a littoral (shoreline) species that may occasionally become dislodged and temporarily survive in the plankton. According to Lars Edler (1975), it favours waters of low salinity and appears primarily during spring. The species demonstrates considerable ability to attach to sand grains, and has been observed growing alongside other Attheya species such as A. arenicola on the same sand grain.

The reproductive cycle of A. decora includes some unusual features, including the production of two female gametes from each auxospore mother cell, a characteristic shared with some species of Odontella but differing from many other diatoms.
