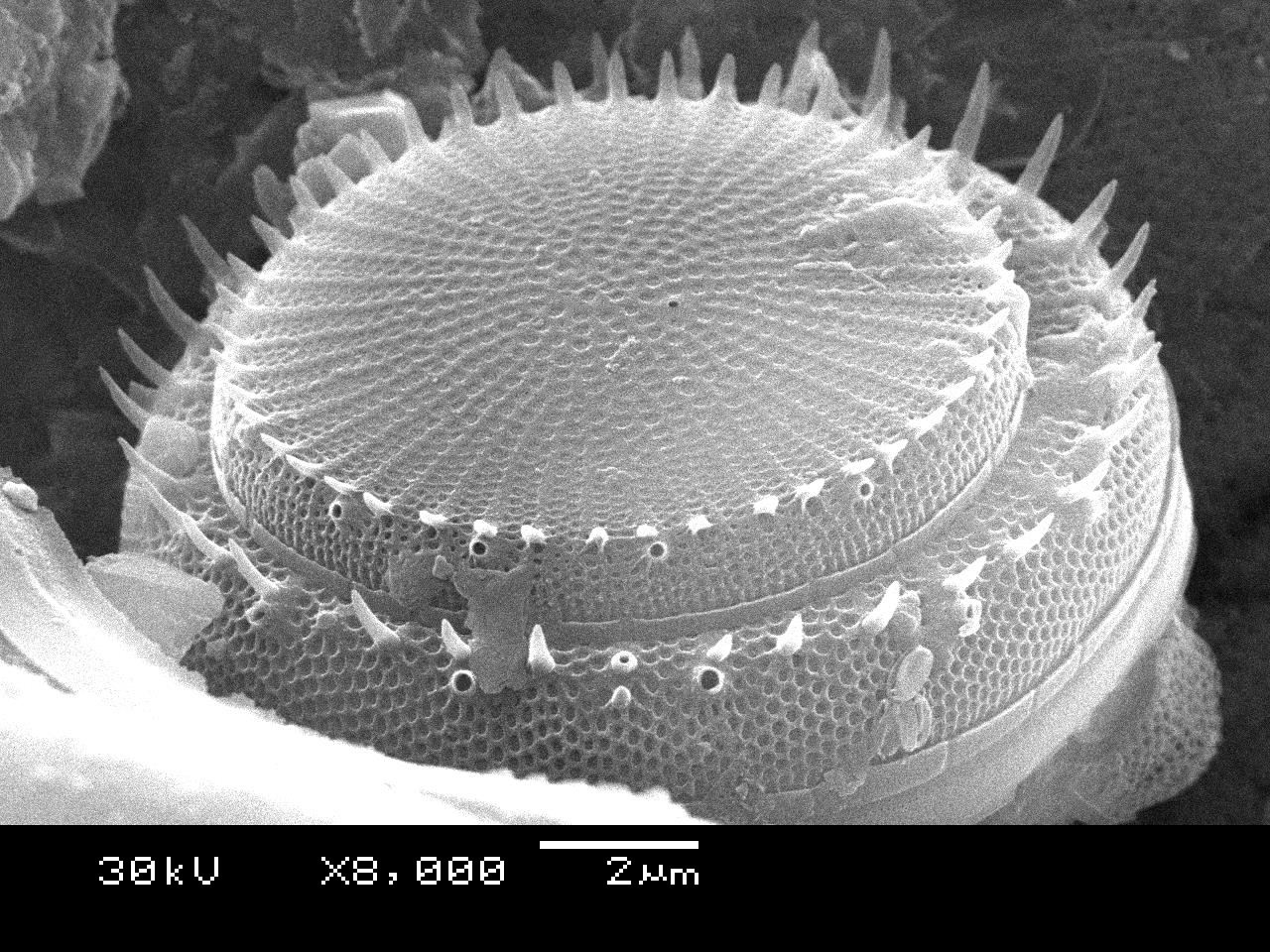

Scientific classification
- Domain: Eukaryota
- Clade: Sar
- Clade: Stramenopiles
- Division: Ochrophyta
- Clade: Diatomeae
- Class: Mediophyceae
- Order: Thalassiosirales
- Family: Stephanodiscaceae
- Genus: Stephanodiscus
- Species: S. hantzschii

Binomial name
- Stephanodiscus hantzschii Grunow, 1880

= Stephanodiscus hantzschii =

Genus of algae

Stephanodiscus hantzschii is a centric diatom in the family Stephanodiscaceae, recognized for its circular, silica-based frustule and its ecological role as a primary producer in freshwater environments. It thrives in nutrient-rich waters and serves as a bioindicator of eutrophication and a tool in paleolimnology for reconstructing environmental histories.

== Characteristics ==
Stephanodiscus hantzschii is a small centric diatom with a circular valve (frustule) typically 5–20 micrometers in diameter. Its frustule features radial striae (rows of pores) and a central area with areolae (small openings) arranged in a distinctive pattern, often used for identification. It is primarily found in freshwater environments, such as lakes, rivers, and reservoirs, often thriving in nutrient-rich (eutrophic) waters. As a photosynthetic diatom, it is a primary producer in aquatic food webs, contributing to carbon cycling and serving as a food source for zooplankton. It is widely used as a bioindicator of water quality, particularly for high nutrient levels (e.g., phosphorus and nitrogen), and is associated with eutrophic conditions.

The fossilized frustules of S. hantzschii are preserved in lake sediments, making it valuable for paleolimnological studies to reconstruct past environmental conditions, such as nutrient levels and water quality. It is cosmopolitan, reported in freshwater systems across North America, Europe, and other regions, particularly in temperate climates. Its abundance is often linked to anthropogenic nutrient inputs, making it a key species for monitoring lake eutrophication caused by agricultural runoff or urban pollution.
