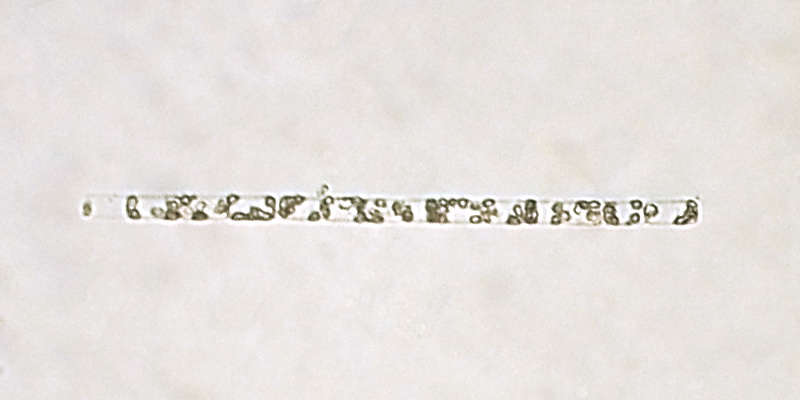
- Dactyliosolen fragilissimus

Scientific classification
- Domain: Eukaryota
- Clade: Sar
- Clade: Stramenopiles
- Clade: Ochrophyta
- Division: Bacillariophyta
- Class: Coscinodiscophyceae
- Subclass: Coscinodiscophycidae
- Order: Rhizosoleniales
- Family: Rhizosoleniaceae; De Toni, 1890

= Rhizosoleniaceae =

Family of algae

Rhizosoleniaceae is a family of diatoms belonging to the order Rhizosoleniales.

Genera:

- Calyptrella Castillo, 1996
- Dactyliosolen A.F.Castracane, 1886
- Guinardia H.Peragallo, 1892
- Henseniella F.Schütt ex G.B.De Toni, 1894
- Neocalyprella Hernàndez-Becerril
- Neocalyptrella Castillo, 1997
- Proboscia B.G.Sundstrom, 1986
- Pseudosolenia B.G.Sundstrom, 1986
- Rhizosolenia T.Brightwell, 1858
- Urosolenia F.E.Round & R.M.Crawford, 1990
