= Papiliocellulus elegans =

Scientific classification
- Domain: Eukaryota
- Clade: Diaphoretickes
- Clade: SAR
- Clade: Stramenopiles
- Phylum: Gyrista
- Subphylum: Ochrophytina
- Class: Bacillariophyceae
- Order: Cymatosirales
- Family: Cymatosiraceae
- Genus: Papiliocellulus
- Species: P. elegans

Binomial name
- Papiliocellulus elegans G.R. Hasle, H.A. von Stosch & E.E. Syvertsen, 1983

Species of single-celled organism

Papiliocellulus elegans is a species of diatom.
