= Lennoxia =

Scientific classification
- Domain: Eukaryota
- Clade: Sar
- Clade: Stramenopiles
- Phylum: Ochrophyta
- Clade: Diatomeae
- Subphylum: Bacillariophytina
- Class: Mediophyceae
- Order: Cymatosirales
- Family: Cymatosiraceae
- Genus: Lennoxia; H.A.Thomsen & K.R.Buck, 1993

Lennoxia is a diatom genus belonging to the Cymatosiraceae family.

The species of this genus are found in Europe and North America.

Species:

- Lennoxia faveolata H.A.Thomsen & K.R.Buck, 1993
