= Gomphonemopsis =

Scientific classification
- Domain: Eukaryota
- Clade: Diaphoretickes
- Clade: SAR
- Clade: Stramenopiles
- Phylum: Gyrista
- Subphylum: Ochrophytina
- Class: Bacillariophyceae
- Order: Cymbellales
- Family: Rhoicospheniaceae
- Genus: Gomphonemopsis; Medlin, 1986

Extant species
- Gomphonemopsis exigua; Gomphonemopsis pseudexigua

Genus of diatoms

Gomphonemopsis is a genus of diatoms belonging to the family Rhoicospheniaceae.

The genus was first described by Linda Medlin in 1986.

Species:

- Gomphonemopsis exigua
- Gomphonemopsis pseudexigua
