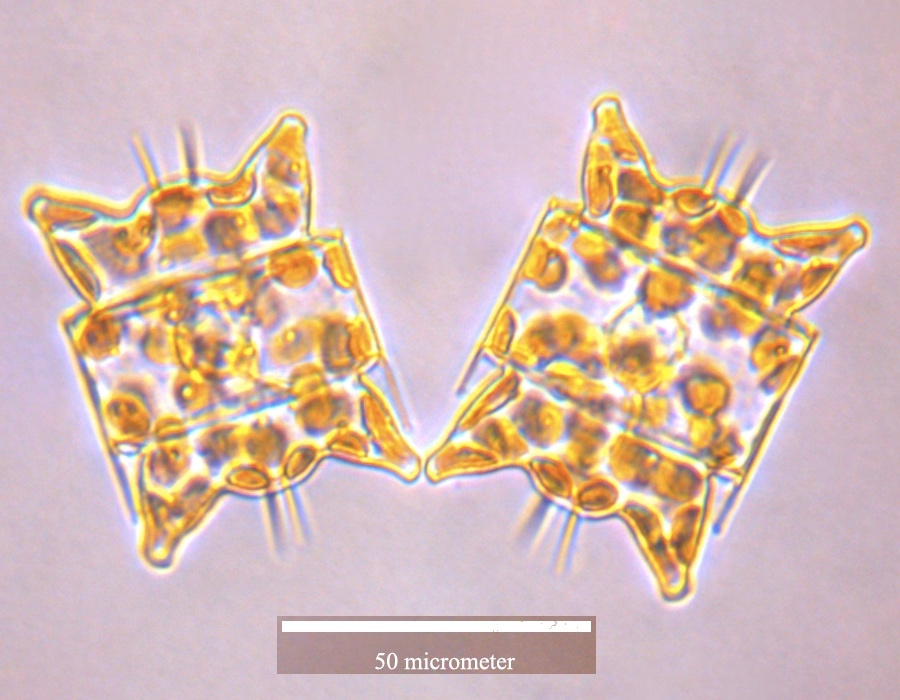
- Odontella aurita

Scientific classification
- Domain: Eukaryota
- Clade: Sar
- Clade: Stramenopiles
- Phylum: Ochrophyta
- Clade: Diatomeae
- Subphylum: Bacillariophytina
- Clade: Biddulphiophyceae
- Clade: Biddulphiophycidae
- Family: Eupodiscaceae; C. A. Agardh 1832

Genera
- Odontella C.A. Agardh

= Eupodiscaceae =

Proposed family of diatoms

Eupodiscaceae is a diatom family used in some classifications (Bacillariophyceae) present both in marine and freshwater habitats Odontella is the only genus in this family with typical marine species. However, Round et al. (1990) placed Odontella in Triceratiaceae (Schutt) Lemmermann, order Triceratiales Round and Crawford, subclass Biddulphiophycidae Round and Crawford. The taxonomic status of this family is unclear and disputed.
