= Eucocconeis depressa =

Scientific classification
- Domain: Eukaryota
- Clade: Sar
- Clade: Stramenopiles
- Division: Ochrophyta
- Clade: Bacillariophyta
- Class: Bacillariophyceae
- Order: Cocconeidales
- Family: Achnanthidiaceae
- Genus: Eucocconeis
- Species: E. depressa

Binomial name
- Eucocconeis depressa Cleve 1891

Synonyms
- Achnanthes depressa; Navicula depressa

Species of single-celled organism

Eucocconeis depressa is a freshwater species of algae of in the genus Eucocconeis. Eucocconeis depressa occurs in Fennoscandia.
