= Kolbesia =

Scientific classification
- Domain: Eukaryota
- Clade: Diaphoretickes
- Clade: SAR
- Clade: Stramenopiles
- Phylum: Gyrista
- Subphylum: Ochrophytina
- Class: Bacillariophyceae
- Order: Achnanthales
- Family: Achnanthidiaceae
- Genus: Kolbesia; Round & Bukhtiyarova ex Round

Genus of diatoms

Kolbesia is a genus of algae belonging to the family Achnanthidiaceae.

The genus was first described by Round and Bukhtiyarova in 1996.

Species:

- Kolbesia gessneri (Hustedt) Aboal
- Kolbesia sichuanenis P.Yu, Q.-M.You & Q.-X.Wang
- Kolbesia sinica Krzywda, Witkowski & Chunlian Li
