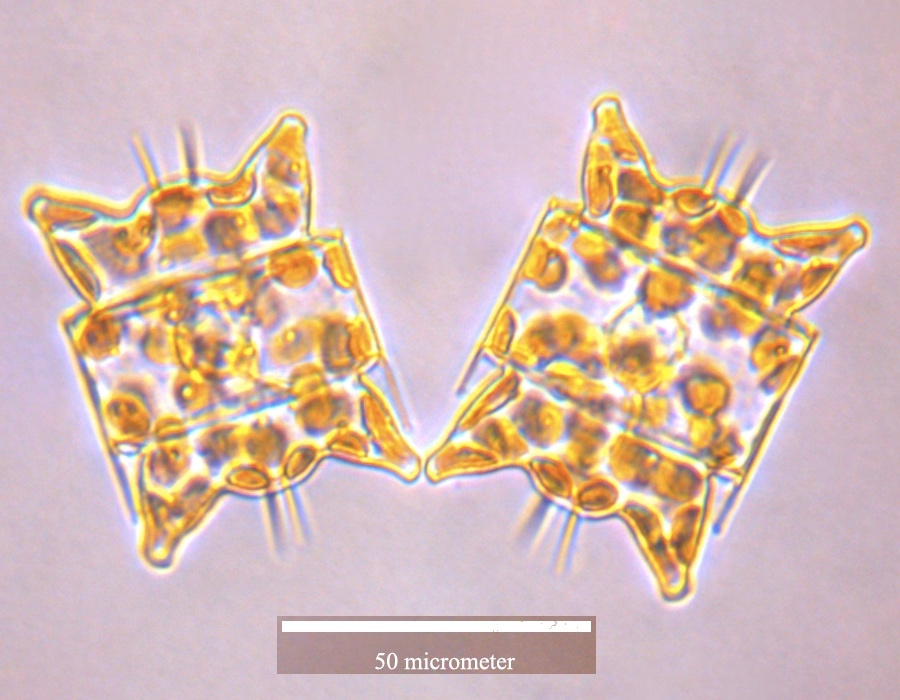

Scientific classification
- Domain: Eukaryota
- Clade: Diaphoretickes
- Clade: SAR
- Clade: Stramenopiles
- Phylum: Gyrista
- Subphylum: Ochrophytina
- Class: Bacillariophyceae
- Order: Triceratiales
- Family: Triceratiaceae
- Genus: Odontella
- Species: O. aurita

Binomial name
- Odontella aurita ((Lyngbye) C. A. Agardh, 1832)

= Odontella aurita =

Species of single-celled organism

Odontella aurita is a diatom and the type species of genus Odontella. The easiest way to identify this species is by recognizing the very distinct shape of the cells belonging to this genus. Odontella aurita is cultivated industrially for human consumption due to its ability to produce up to 28% of its total lipids as eicosapentaenoic acid (EPA), a long-chain polyunsaturated fatty acid (PUFA). PUFAs such as EPA are known to provide a variety of health benefits in humans, and are commonly obtained by fish oil. However, with the increasing concern of over-exploited fisheries, microalgae are a promising source of PUFAs as they can be grown year-round and their fatty acid profile and content are easily manipulated by growth conditions.

== Species description ==
Two or more labiate processes per valve. Numerous chloroplasts lying against the cell walls. Cells in straight chains. Often found in long chains in coastal waters, it frequently acts as an attachment platform for other diatoms.
