= Karayevia =

Scientific classification
- Domain: Eukaryota
- Clade: Diaphoretickes
- Clade: SAR
- Clade: Stramenopiles
- Phylum: Gyrista
- Subphylum: Ochrophytina
- Class: Bacillariophyceae
- Order: Achnanthales
- Family: Achnanthidiaceae
- Genus: Karayevia; Round & L.Bukhtiyarova ex Round

Genus of diatoms

Karayevia is a genus of diatom belonging to the family Achnanthidiaceae.

The genus was first described by Round and L. Bukhtiyarova in 1996.

Species:

- Karayevia amoena
- Karayevia bottnica
- Karayevia clevei
