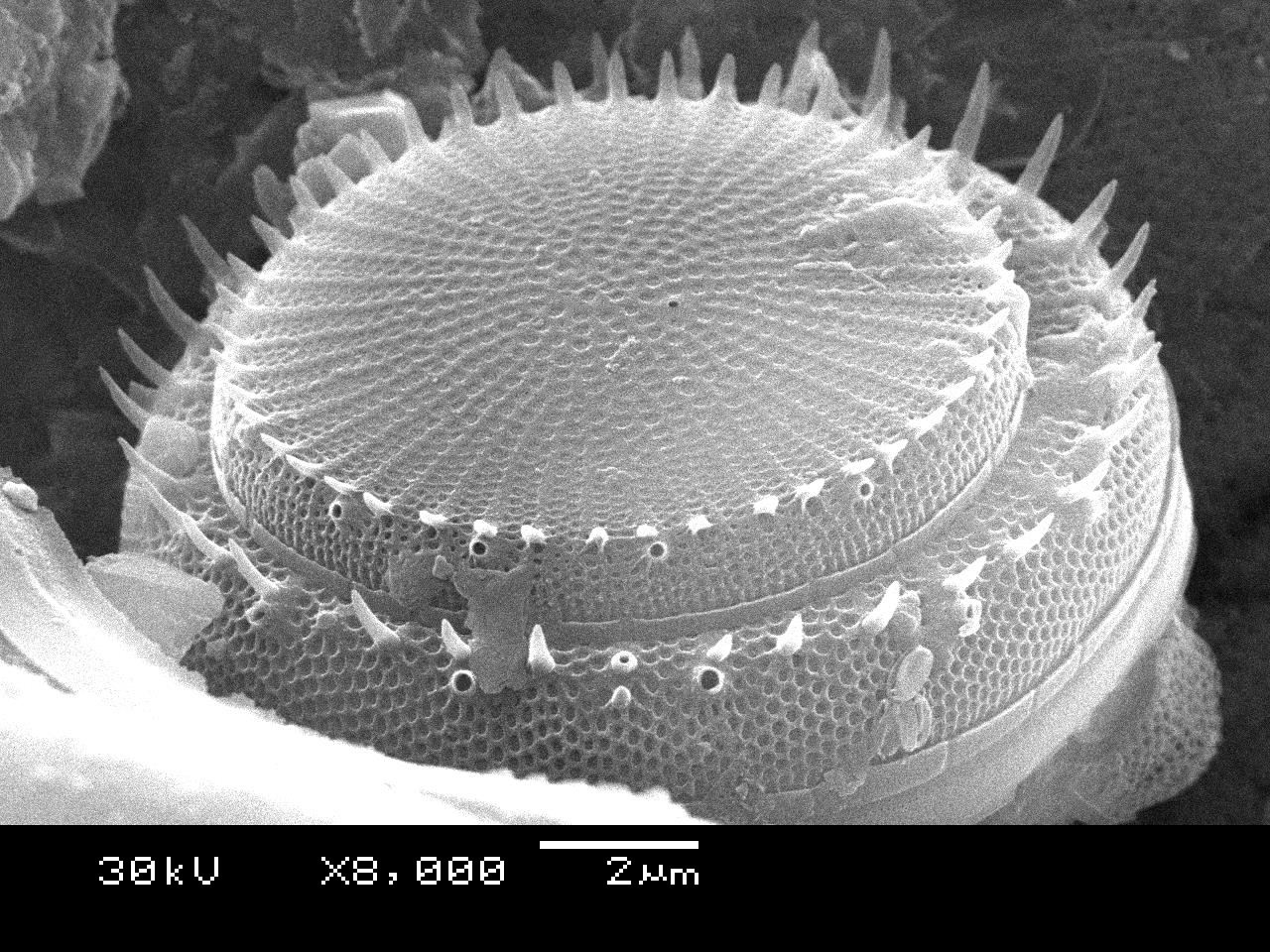
- Stephanodiscus hantzschii

Scientific classification
- Domain: Eukaryota
- Clade: Sar
- Clade: Stramenopiles
- Division: Ochrophyta
- Clade: Diatomeae
- Class: Mediophyceae
- Order: Thalassiosirales
- Family: Stephanodiscaceae
- Genus: Stephanodiscus; Castracane, 1886

= Stephanodiscus =

Genus of algae

Stephanodiscus is a genus of centric diatoms, belong to the family Stephanodiscaceae. These diatoms are single-celled, photosynthetic algae characterized by circular, radially symmetrical silica cell walls (frustules).

They are commonly found in freshwater environments, such as lakes and rivers, and are ecologically significant as primary producers in aquatic food webs. Stephanodiscus species, like Stephanodiscus hantzschii or Stephanodiscus niagarae, are often used as indicators of environmental conditions, including water quality and nutrient levels, due to their sensitivity to changes in their habitat. Their intricate frustule patterns are also studied in paleolimnology to reconstruct past environmental conditions.
