= Ethmodiscus =

Scientific classification
- Domain: Eukaryota
- Clade: Sar
- Clade: Stramenopiles
- Division: Ochrophyta
- Clade: Bacillariophyta
- Class: Coscinodiscophyceae
- Subclass: Coscinodiscophycidae
- Order: incertae sedis
- Genus: Ethmodiscus; A.F. Castracane, 1886

Genus of diatoms

Ethmodiscus is a genus of diatoms found widely scattered throughout the intertropical and temperate zones in the world's oceans. The large diatom genus can get up to 2mm in size, and it has distinct cell features like a vacuole that comprises over 99% of its cell's volume. Despite their large size, they are known to be in open oceans in low quantity. While in the ocean, Ethmodiscus use buoyancy control to migrate up and down to the high nitrogen depths and return to the surface to photosynthesize. Additionally, the biological characteristics of Ethmodiscus are an important component in interpreting deep-sea sedimentary richness and distribution.

Ethmodiscus rex is one of the most frequent species found in deep-sea sediments. The species was found by John D. Wiseman and Ingram N. Hendey in 1952 on the deep-sea floor by the H.M.S. Challenger. During this time, E. rex was known to rarely be found in the living state in plankton communities.
