= Karayevia amoena =

Scientific classification
- Domain: Eukaryota
- Clade: Sar
- Clade: Stramenopiles
- Division: Ochrophyta
- Clade: Bacillariophyta
- Class: Bacillariophyceae
- Order: Mastogloiales
- Family: Stauroneidaceae
- Genus: Karayevia
- Species: K. amoena

Binomial name
- Karayevia amoena (Hustedt) Bukhtiyarova, 1999

Species of diatom

Karayevia amoena is a species of diatom belonging to the family Achnanthidiaceae.

This species inhabits freshwater environments.

Synonym:

- Kolbesia amoena (Hustedt) J.C.Kingston, 2000
