= Attheya septentrionalis =

Scientific classification
- Domain: Eukaryota
- Clade: Diaphoretickes
- Clade: Sar
- Clade: Stramenopiles
- Phylum: Gyrista
- Subphylum: Ochrophytina
- Class: Bacillariophyceae
- Order: incertae sedis
- Family: Attheyaceae
- Genus: Attheya
- Species: A. septentrionalis

Binomial name
- Attheya septentrionalis ((Østrup) R.M.Crawford, 1994)

Species of single-celled organism

Attheya septentrionalis is a species of diatom—microscopic, single-celled algae with silica cell walls—belonging to the genus Attheya in the family Attheyaceae. It is distinguished by its rectangular cells with long, wavy horn-like structures that project from the corners of the valve, and is primarily found attached to the undersurface of sea ice in Arctic regions. Initially classified as Chaetoceros septentrionalis when first described by the Danish diatomist Ernst Østrup in 1895, it was later transferred to the genus Gonioceros in 1990, before receiving its current classification when Richard Crawford and colleagues demonstrated in 1994 that this species should be placed within the genus Attheya due to its distinctive horn structure and ecological preferences.

== Taxonomy ==
Attheya septentrionalis was initially classified within the genus Chaetoceros when first described by Ernst Østrup in 1895. It was later transferred to the genus Gonioceros as Gonioceros septentrionalis by Round, Crawford, and Mann in 1990. Its current classification came in 1994, when Richard Crawford and colleagues conducted a morphological analysis demonstrating that this species and several others should be united within the genus Attheya due to their similar horn structure and ecological preferences.

The taxonomic history of A. septentrionalis has been complicated by confusion with similar species. In early literature, it was sometimes confused with Attheya longicornis, which shares some morphological characteristics but differs in significant ways. Historical synonyms include Chaetoceros glaciale described by Alphonse Meunier in 1910.

== Description ==
Attheya septentrionalis is distinguished by its rectangular cells when viewed from the side (in girdle view). The cells typically measure 4–6 micrometres (μm) in apical axis (length) and 4–6 μm in transapical axis (width). The most distinctive feature of A. septentrionalis is its long, wavy horns (elongated silica projections) that extend from the corners of the valve. These horns project parallel to the valvar plane of the cell, creating a characteristic appearance. Each horn contains four longitudinal supporting strips that spiral around the length of the structure. The horns terminate in circular openings surrounded by short, well-defined spines.

The valve face consists of a central area surrounded by radiating ribs and has an undifferentiated margin. Unlike many similar diatoms in the genus Chaetoceros, A. septentrionalis does not produce resting spores. The protoplast (cell contents) contains small, disc-shaped plastids (chloroplasts) and is capable of extending into the horns. When cell division occurs, the new horns form in a tightly coiled configuration within the confines of the parental girdle bands before uncoiling when released.

In light microscopy, A. septentrionalis is distinguished from other Attheya by having curly setae. This species is easily confused with A. longicornis but the latter have long setae that are not curly.

== Habitat and distribution ==
Attheya septentrionalis is primarily found attached to the undersurface of sea ice in Arctic regions. It was originally described from samples collected from ice floes off East Greenland. The species has an unusual ecological niche, living in association with sea ice, which distinguishes it from many related diatoms.

When sea ice melts, A. septentrionalis can be released into the water column and found in the plankton. It appears to be specifically adapted to low temperature environments and is considered characteristic of Arctic marine ecosystems.

Unlike many closely related species that inhabit sandy beaches or form associations with other planktonic organisms, A. septentrionalis has evolved specific adaptations for attachment to ice substrates, representing a specialized ecological strategy among diatoms.
