= Odontella sinensis =

Scientific classification
- Domain: Eukaryota
- Clade: Sar
- Clade: Stramenopiles
- Division: Ochrophyta
- Clade: Bacillariophyta
- Class: Thalassiosirophyceae
- Order: Eupodiscales
- Family: Odontellaceae
- Genus: Odontella
- Species: O. sinensis

Binomial name
- Odontella sinensis (Greville) Grunow

Species of single-celled organism

Odontella sinensis, is a marine, unicellular species of diatom in the family Triceratiaceae.
