= Attheya gaussii =

Scientific classification
- Domain: Eukaryota
- Clade: Sar
- Clade: Stramenopiles
- Division: Ochrophyta
- Clade: Diatomeae
- Class: Biddulphiophyceae
- Genus: Attheya
- Species: A. gaussii

Binomial name
- Attheya gaussii ((Heiden) R. M. Crawford, 2000)

Species of single-celled organism

Attheya gaussii is a species of diatoms in the genus Attheya.
