= Eucocconeis =

Scientific classification
- Domain: Eukaryota
- Clade: Sar
- Clade: Stramenopiles
- Division: Ochrophyta
- Clade: Bacillariophyta
- Class: Bacillariophyceae
- Order: Cocconeidales
- Family: Achnanthidiaceae
- Genus: Eucocconeis; Meister, 1912

Extant species
- See text

Genus of diatoms

Eucocconeis is a genus of diatoms belonging to the family Achnanthidiaceae.

The genus was first described by Cleve ex F. Meister in 1912.

Species:

- Eucocconeis alpestris (Brun) H. Lange-Bertalot
- Eucocconeis aretasii (E. Manguin) H. Lange-Bertalot
- Eucocconeis austriaca (Hustedt) H. Lange-Bertalot
- Eucocconeis depressa (Cleve) H. Lange-Bertalot
- Eucocconeis diluviana (Hustedt) H. Lange-Bertalot
- Eucocconeis dorogostaisky (Jasnitsky) Sheshukova-Poretzkaya
- Eucocconeis flexella (Kützing) Meister, 1912
- Eucocconeis laevis (Østrup) H. Lange-Bertalot
- Eucocconeis lapponica Hustedt, 1924
- Eucocconeis leptostriata H. Lange-Bertalot
- Eucocconeis ninckei (P. Guermeur & E. Manguin) H. Lange-Bertalot
- Eucocconeis onegensis Wislouch & Kolbe, 1916
- Eucocconeis poretzkyi (Jasnitsky) Sheshukova-Poretzkaya
- Eucocconeis quadratarea (Østrup) H. Lange-Bertalot, 1999
