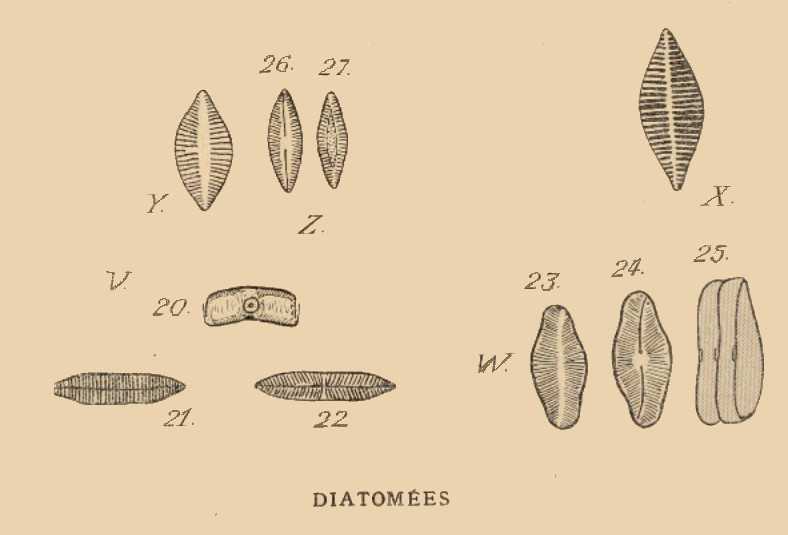
- Achnanthes sp.

Scientific classification
- Domain: Eukaryota
- Clade: Sar
- Clade: Stramenopiles
- Division: Ochrophyta
- Clade: Diatomeae
- Class: Bacillariophyceae
- Order: Achnanthales
- Family: Achnanthaceae; Kützing 1844

= Achnanthaceae =

Family of diatoms

Achnanthaceae is a family of algae belonging to the order Achnanthales, and was first described in 1844 by Friedrich Traugott Kützing.

Genera:

- Achnanthes Bory, 1822
- Amphicocconeis M.De Stephano & D.Marino, 2002
- Diatomella
- Haloroundia C.A.Düaz & N.I.Maidana, 2006
- Platebaikalia Kulikovskiy, Glushchenko, Genkal & Kociolek, 2020
- Platessa H.Lange-Bertalot, 2004
