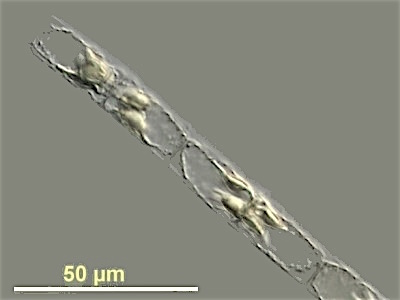
- Guinardia delicatula

Scientific classification
- Domain: Eukaryota
- Clade: Sar
- Clade: Stramenopiles
- Division: Ochrophyta
- Clade: Bacillariophyta
- Class: Coscinodiscophyceae
- Order: Rhizosoleniales
- Family: Rhizosoleniaceae
- Genus: Guinardia; Peragallo, 1892

Extant species
- See text

= Guinardia =

Genus of diatoms

Guinardia is a genus of diatoms belonging to the family Rhizosoleniaceae.

The genus was first described by H. Peragallo in 1892.

The genus has cosmopolitan distribution.

Species:

- Guinardia delicatula
- Guinardia flaccida
- Guinardia pungens
- Guinardia striata
