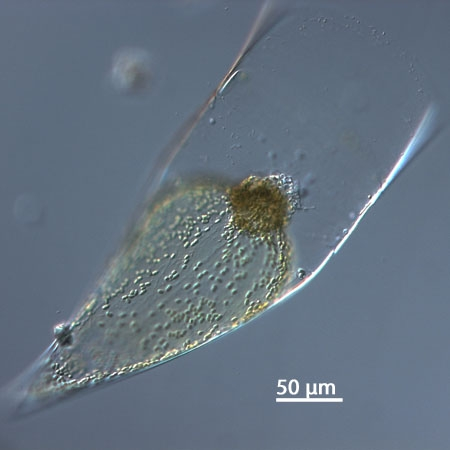

Scientific classification
- Domain: Eukaryota
- Clade: Diaphoretickes
- Clade: SAR
- Clade: Stramenopiles
- Phylum: Gyrista
- Subphylum: Ochrophytina
- Class: Bacillariophyceae
- Order: Rhizosoleniales
- Family: Rhizosoleniaceae
- Genus: Neocalyptrella; D.U.Hernández-Becerril & M.E.Meave del Castillo, 1997

= Neocalyptrella =

Genus of algae

Neocalyptrella is a genus of diatoms belonging to the family Rhizosoleniaceae.

Species:

- Neocalyptrella robusta (G.Norman ex Ralfs) Hernández-Becerril & Castillo
