= Attheya arenicola =

Scientific classification
- Domain: Eukaryota
- Clade: Sar
- Clade: Stramenopiles
- Division: Ochrophyta
- Clade: Bacillariophyta
- Class: Biddulphiophyceae
- Order: Attheyales
- Family: Attheyaceae
- Genus: Attheya
- Species: A. arenicola

Binomial name
- Attheya arenicola (Gardner & Crawford, 1994)

Species of single-celled organism

Attheya arenicola is a microscopic organism found on sandy beaches along European coastlines. It belongs to a group of water-dwelling microorganisms called diatoms, which are characterised by their glass-like outer shells made of silica. First officially documented in 1994, this tiny organism features a distinctive rectangular shape with four long, horn-like projections extending from its corners. Unlike many related species that float freely in open water, Attheya arenicola specifically thrives in the sand of tidal zones, which is reflected in its Latin name meaning "sand-dweller".

== Taxonomy ==
Attheya arenicola was discovered during a programme of collecting and culturing smaller diatoms from around British coasts. It was formally described in 1994 by Claire Gardner and Richard M. Crawford, who recognised its similarities to Attheya decora (the type species of the genus) but identified several morphological differences that justified its classification as a new species. The type locality was Penbre, Dyfed, South Wales on intertidal sand (Grid reference: S 405985). This is where the holotype specimen (BM 81902) was collected, which serves as the reference specimen for the species.

The genus Attheya itself has had a complicated taxonomic history. Initially, there was uncertainty about its systematic position, with early classifications placing it within the Biddulphieae. By 1994, when A. arenicola was described, researchers were recognising the distinctive characteristics that separated Attheya from other genera, particularly the unique structure of its horns and its habitat preferences. The genus name honours the British diatomist Thomas Atthey.

The specific epithet arenicola derives from Latin, meaning "sand-dweller", alluding to its typical habitat on sandy beaches.

== Description ==
Attheya arenicola is a compressed, rectangular cell generally smaller than Attheya decora. Cells range from 3 to 23 micrometres (μm) in apical axis length and 2 to 3 μm in transapical axis width. The pervalvar axis (the dimension perpendicular to the valve face) varies, with larger specimens appearing isodiametric in girdle view, while smaller cells or those preparing to divide appear elongated in this dimension.

The most distinctive features of A. arenicola include:

- Four horn-like projections (one at each corner of the cell) that extend at roughly 45° angles from the junction of the valve face and mantle. These horns are relatively longer than those of A. decora.
- Four plastids (chloroplasts) arranged in a rosette pattern, with broad, spatulate (spoon-shaped) ends pointing outward and narrow inner ends containing visible pyrenoids (structures involved in carbon fixation).
- An asymmetrically placed cell nucleus that lies between two plastids and one of the valves.
- A single rimoportula (a specialised opening in the silica cell wall) positioned near one end of each valve, with the rimoportulae of the two valves typically arranged diagonally relative to each other.

The valve face is oval with a central part that is thinly silicified, surrounded by radiating fingerlike ribs. These ribs are more pronounced at the valve apices and continue into the horns as supporting strips. The horns themselves are formed by loops of silica that create a D-shaped tube in cross-section, with about eight strips running up the entire length on the advalvar surface. Each horn terminates in a circular opening surrounded by a small rim of silica, occasionally with a spine attached.

The cell wall also includes a series of bands (the cingulum) that encircle the cell. These bands are smooth and mostly lacking in perforations, except for distinctive pores or slits in specific locations on the valvocopula (the band adjacent to the valve). In living cells, the cytoplasm projects into each horn and retracts from the inner surface of the frustule (silica cell wall) evenly along the surface of the valve face. When cells divide, the horns of the new valves initially fold between the sibling valves, confined by the enclosing girdle bands, before extending as the cells separate.
