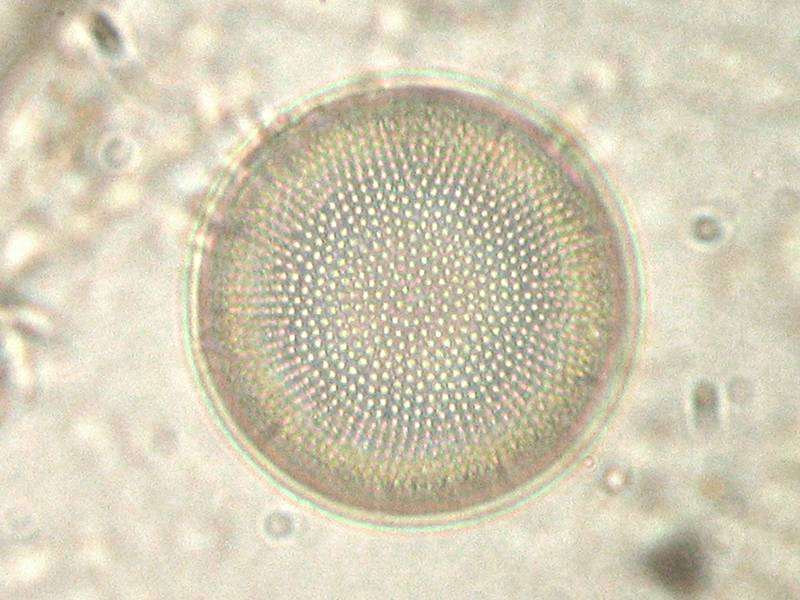
- Actinocyclus normanii

Scientific classification
- Domain: Eukaryota
- Clade: Sar
- Clade: Stramenopiles
- Division: Ochrophyta
- Clade: Bacillariophyta
- Class: Coscinodiscophyceae
- Order: Coscinodiscales
- Family: Hemidiscaceae
- Genus: Actinocyclus; Ehrenberg, 1837

= Actinocyclus (diatom) =

Genus of single-celled organisms

Actinocyclus is a genus of diatoms in the family Hemidiscaceae.

In 2006, a study was carried out which included finding traces of extinct Actinocylidae in Russia, which ultimately assisted geologists in dating its prevalence and significance to history. Out of 7236 samples found, they concluded that this species belongs to a group of known as Actinocyclus gorbunovii. Freshwater species of Actinocyclus were also found to have a major part in playing a stratigraphic marker, also known as an estimated time in which geologists can use to help order things in a sequence of events. Using K–Ar dating, scientists concluded that Actinocyclus species were found to be most optimal in the middle-age Miocene era.
