= Papiliocellulus =

Scientific classification
- Domain: Eukaryota
- Clade: Diaphoretickes
- Clade: SAR
- Clade: Stramenopiles
- Phylum: Gyrista
- Subphylum: Ochrophytina
- Class: Bacillariophyceae
- Order: Cymatosirales
- Family: Cymatosiraceae
- Genus: Papiliocellulus; G.R. Hasle, H.A. von Stosch & E.E. Syvertsen, 1983

Species
- Several, including: Papiliocellulus elegans; Papiliocellulus simplex

Genus of single-celled organisms

Papiliocellulus is a genus of diatoms.
