= Attheya armata =

Scientific classification
- Domain: Eukaryota
- Clade: Diaphoretickes
- Clade: SAR
- Clade: Stramenopiles
- Phylum: Gyrista
- Subphylum: Ochrophytina
- Class: Bacillariophyceae
- Order: incertae sedis
- Family: Attheyaceae
- Genus: Attheya
- Species: A. armata

Binomial name
- Attheya armata ((T. West) R. M. Crawford, 1994)

Synonyms
- Chaetoceros armatus West 1860; Gonioceros armatum (T. West) Peragallo & Peragallo 1897-1908

Species of single-celled organism

Attheya armata is a species of diatoms in the genus Attheya.
