= Cymatosira =

Scientific classification
- Domain: Eukaryota
- Clade: Diaphoretickes
- Clade: SAR
- Clade: Stramenopiles
- Phylum: Gyrista
- Subphylum: Ochrophytina
- Class: Bacillariophyceae
- Order: Cymatosirales
- Family: Cymatosiraceae
- Genus: Cymatosira; Grunow (1862)

Species
- See text

Genus of single-celled organisms

Cymatosira is a genus of diatoms in the family Cymatosiraceae. It is the type genus of its family.

== Species ==
- Cymatosira belgica Grunow, 1881
- Cymatosira elliptica Salah, 1955
- Cymatosira gibberula Cheng & Gao, 1993
- Cymatosira lorenziana Grunow, 1862
- Cymatosira capensis Giffen, 1975
- Cymatosira acremonica Schrader, 1969
- Cymatosira adaroi Azpeitia Moros, 1911
- Cymatosira andersonii Hanna, 1932
- Cymatosira biharensis Pantocsek, 1889
- Cymatosira biharensis Pantocsek, 1889
- Cymatosira compacta Schrader & Fenner, 1976
- Cymatosira cornuta Schrader & Fenner, 1976
- Cymatosira coronata Fenner & Schrader in Schrader & Fenner, 1976
- Cymatosira curvata Cleve-Euler, 1949
- Cymatosira debyi Tempère & Brun in Brun & Tempère, 1889
- Cymatosira fossilis Schrader in Schrader & Fenner, 1976
- Cymatosira immunis (Lohman) Abbott in Abbott & Ernissee, 1983
- Cymatosira japonica Tempère & Brun in Brun & Tempère, 1889
- Cymatosira magna Lohman, 1974
- Cymatosira miocaenica Hajós, 1973
- Cymatosira miocaenica Hajós, 1977
- Cymatosira palpebraforma M.P. Olney in Olney et al., 2007
- Cymatosira praecompacta Fenner & Schrader in Schrader & Fenner, 1976
- Cymatosira robusta Schrader & Fenner, 1976
- Cymatosira savtchenkoi Proschkina-Lavrenko, 1960

Names brought to synonymy

- Cymatosira laevis Heiden, 1928 accepted as Synedropsis laevis (Heiden) G.R.Hasle, L.K.Medlin & E.E.Syvertsen, 1994
- Cymatosira minutissima K.Sabbe & K.Muylaert, 2010 accepted as Cymatosirella minutissima (Sabbe & Muylaert) P.Dabek, Witkowski & Sabbe, 2013
