= Attheya flexuosa =

Scientific classification
- Domain: Eukaryota
- Clade: Sar
- Clade: Stramenopiles
- Division: Ochrophyta
- Clade: Bacillariophyta
- Class: Biddulphiophyceae
- Order: Attheyales
- Family: Attheyaceae
- Genus: Attheya
- Species: A. flexuosa

Binomial name
- Attheya flexuosa (C.Gardner, 1994)

Species of single-celled organism

Attheya flexuosa is a species of diatom—a type of single-celled microscopic algae with distinctive silica cell walls—belonging to the genus Attheya in the family Attheyaceae. It is characterised by its rectangular shape and distinctive curved horn-like projections from the corners of the cell. The species is known for its close association with other diatoms, particularly species of Hantzschia and Bacillaria, and inhabits sandy intertidal beaches.

== Taxonomy ==
Attheya flexuosa was first described in 1994 by Claire Gardner, who discovered it during a programme of collecting and culturing smaller diatoms from around the British coasts. Two varieties have been recognised: the nominate form A. flexuosa var. flexuosa and A. flexuosa var. enodulifer Gardner.

The species name flexuosa refers to the distinctive curved or flexuous nature of its horns, which distinguishes it from other members of the genus. The variety enodulifer (meaning "without nodules") was separated from the nominate variety based on the absence of a thickened central area in the valvocopula (the band adjacent to the valve).

The taxonomic placement of A. flexuosa within the genus Attheya follows from a re-evaluation of the genus by Crawford, Gardner, and Medlin (1994), who demonstrated that several species previously classified in other genera, including Chaetoceros and Gonioceros, shared distinctive horn structures and habitat preferences with Attheya.

== Description ==
Attheya flexuosa is a solitary diatom with rectangular cells when viewed from the side (in girdle view). Cells range from 3 to 15 micrometres (μm) in apical axis length and 1.5 to 2 μm in transapical axis width.

The nominate variety, A. flexuosa var. flexuosa, is distinguished by the presence of a highly refractive "nodule" at the centre of each valve, visible with light microscopy. This structure is actually a thickening at the centre of the valvocopula (the silica band adjacent to the valve). This feature is absent in var. enodulifer.

The horns project from the corners of the valve, bisecting the angle between the valve face and mantle. Over their length, they curve in various directions, giving the species its name. In larger specimens of var. enodulifer, the valves may have an undulate (wavy) profile in girdle view, but this undulation disappears as cell size diminishes, and in small cells, the valve face can be concave. Each horn has only two (sometimes three) vertical ribs supporting it, compared to the 8–10 ribs found in other Attheya species. The horn tip ends in a circlet of tiny spines, numbering about 15–16 in var. flexuosa and up to 24 in larger specimens of var. enodulifer.

Following cell division, the horns of the new valves are initially rolled up within the space between the cells, confined by the parental girdle bands. The structure and action of the horns resemble that of a child's toy that extends when blown into—normally rolled up but extending when cell turgor (internal pressure) is maintained.

The valve face consists of three regions: a central area, an area of radiating ribs, and an undifferentiated margin. In var. enodulifer, the radiating ribs are better developed towards the horns than near the centre of the valve.

A distinctive feature of 'A. flexuosa' is the specialised valvocopula—a plate-like silica structure beneath each valve that extends along the entire valve and into the bases of the horns. In var. flexuosa, this structure has a thickened centre (creating the visible "nodule"), while in var. enodulifer it is more evenly silicified.

The species Attheya ussuriensis is somewhat similar in morphology. Attheya flexuosa differs from A. ussurensis primarily in its horn structure and complexity: while A. ussurensis has 12–14 longitudinal strips supporting its horns, A. flexuosa possesses a much simpler design with only two longitudinal strips. Additionally, A. ussurensis has pores along the entire length of its girdle bands, whereas A. flexuosa lacks perforations in its girdle bands entirely.

== Habitat and distribution ==
Attheya flexuosa inhabits sandy intertidal beaches and has an ecological relationship with other diatoms. The species was first noticed because it was attached to, or closely associated with, individual cells of the pennate diatom Hantzschia distincte-punctata. It has subsequently been observed attached to Bacillaria paxillifer as well.

Both varieties of A. flexuosa have been collected from various locations around the British Isles. Variety flexuosa has been found at Benllech in Gwynedd, North Wales; Port Eynon in Gower, Wales; and Rock in Cornwall, England. Variety enodulifer was described from specimens collected at Renesse in the Netherlands.

This diatom represents one of several Attheya species that have specialised to benthic (bottom-dwelling) habitats, in contrast to the truly planktonic lifestyle of related genera such as Chaetoceros. Its distinctive association with other diatom species suggests a commensal or potentially parasitic relationship, though the exact nature of this relationship remains to be fully investigated.
