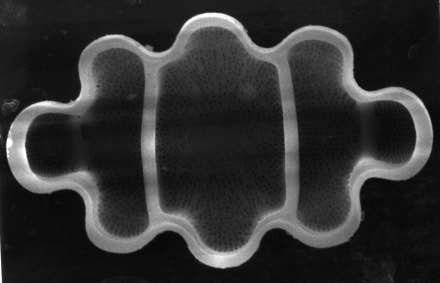
- Terpsinoe americana

Scientific classification
- Domain: Eukaryota
- Clade: Sar
- Clade: Stramenopiles
- Phylum: Ochrophyta
- Clade: Diatomeae
- Class: Biddulphiophyceae
- Subclass: Biddulphiophycidae
- Order: Biddulphiales
- Family: Biddulphiaceae; Kützing, 1844

Genera
- See text

= Biddulphiaceae =

Family of single-celled organisms

Biddulphiaceae is a family of diatoms, the only family in the order Biddulphiales. The Biddulphiaceae are distinguished from the Eupodiscaceae by their pseudocelli, where the Eupodiscaceae have fully developed ocelli. Both families commonly inhabit the littoral zone of the ocean, close to the shore. Sixteen species of Biddulphiaceae are found on the west coast of India.

== Genera ==
- † Alveoflexus - N.I. Hendey & P.A. Sims, 1984
- † Ancoropsis - N.I. Hendey & P.A. Sims, 1984
- Arcusidiscus - S.Komura, 2008
- Biddulphia - S.F. Gray, 1821
- Biddulphiopsis - H.A. von Stosch & R. Simonsen, 1984
- † Donskinica - Strelnikova & Kozyrenko
- † Euodiella - P.A. Sims, 2000
- † Fenneria - J.Witkowski, 2018
- Hydrosera - G.C. Wallich, 1858
- Isthmia - C. A. Agardh, 1832
- † Medlinia - P.A. Sims, 1998
- Neohuttonia - O. Kuntze, 1898
- Pseudotriceratium - A. Grunow, 1884
- Stoermeria - J.P. Kociolek, L. Escobar & S. Richardson, 1996
- Terpsinoë - C.G. Ehrenberg, 1843
- Trigonium - P.T. Cleve, 1867

== Gallery ==
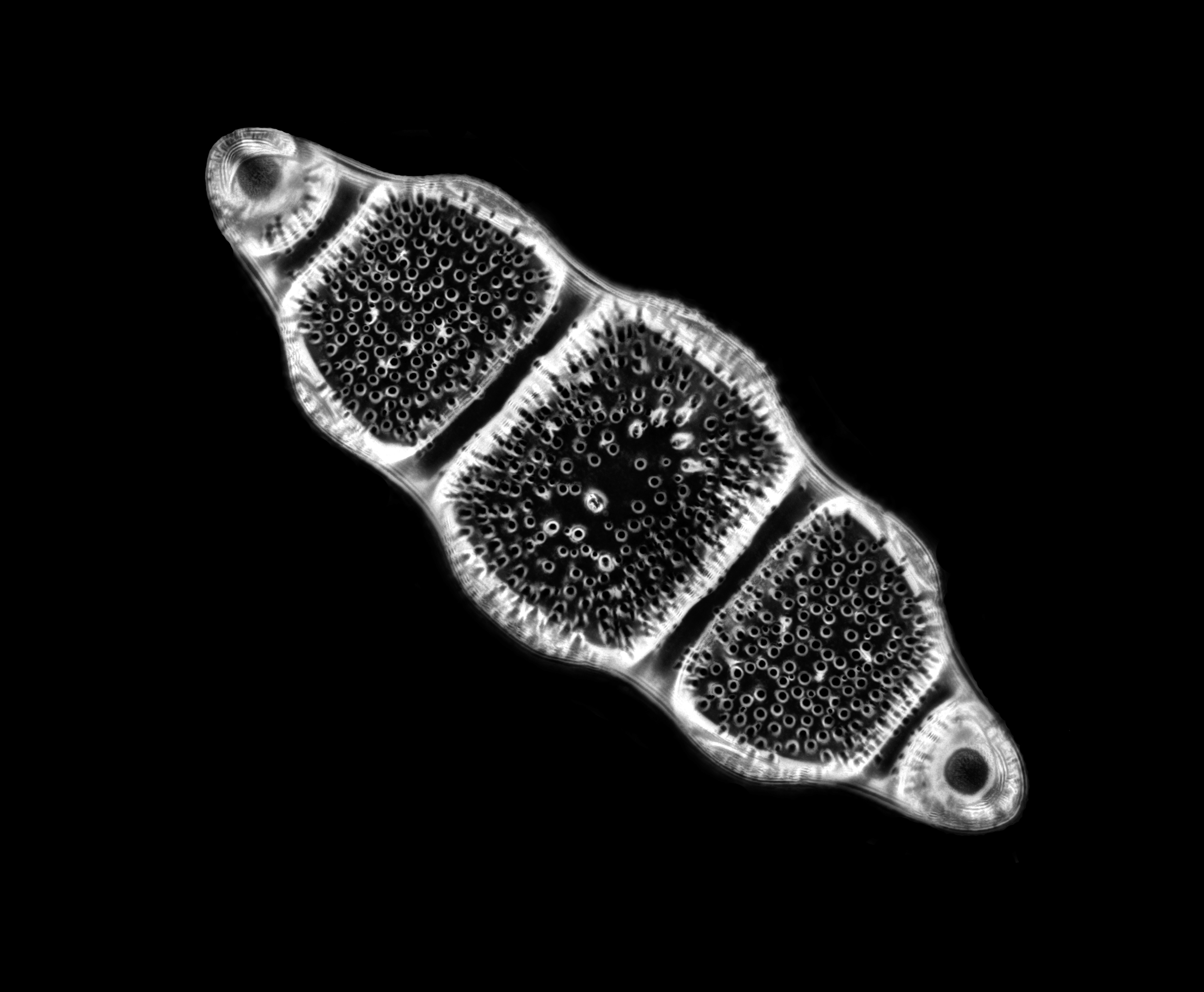
Biddulphia rigida

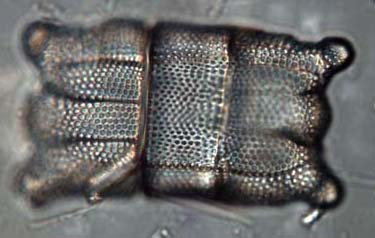
Biddulphia pulchella

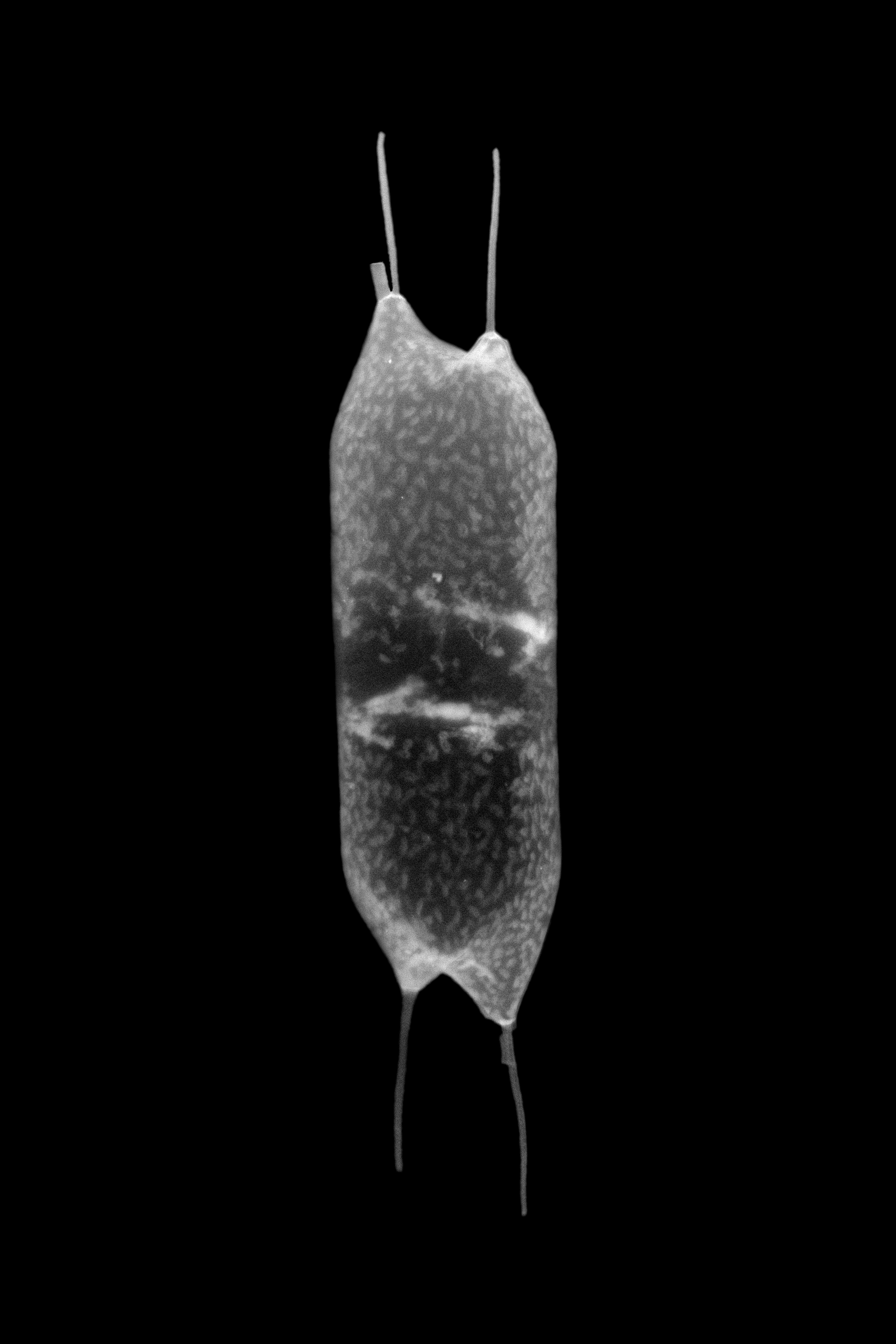
Biddulphia sp.
