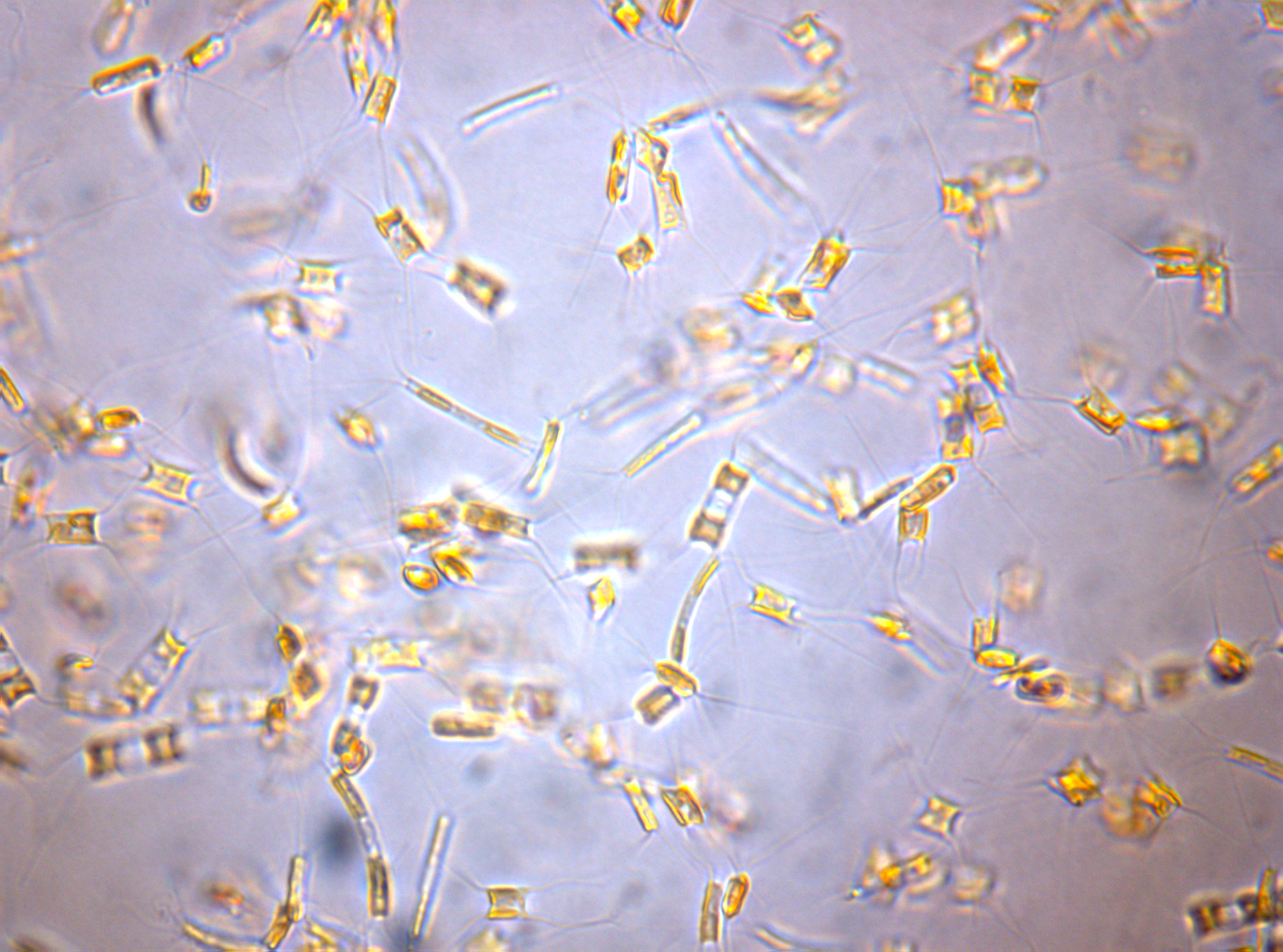

Scientific classification
- Domain: Eukaryota
- Clade: Sar
- Clade: Stramenopiles
- Clade: Ochrophyta
- Division: Bacillariophyta
- Class: Biddulphiophyceae
- Subclass: Attheyaphycidae
- Order: Attheyales
- Family: Attheyaceae
- Genus: Attheya; T. West

Species
- See text

= Attheya =

Genus of single-celled organisms

Attheya is a genus of small single celled diatoms. Some of these species were earlier regarded to belong to Chaetoceros, or to Gonioceros, the taxonomic status of some of these species are still debated.

== Description ==
They are distinguished morphologically from Chaetoceros by the structure of valve outgrowths or girdle bands. The girdle bands can only be seen with an electron microscope. Resting spores are seldom observed. Vegetative cells tend to attach to different substrates, including other diatoms, and are sometimes referred to as epiphytic. However, they are also observed to be planktonic.

== Species ==
- Attheya arenicola C. Gardner & R. M. Crawford
- Attheya armata (T. West) R. M. Crawford
- Attheya decora T. West
- Attheya flexuosa var. enodulifer C. Gardner
- Attheya flexuosa C. Gardner
- Attheya gaussii (Heiden) R. M. Crawford
- Attheya lata Wooszynska
- Attheya longicornis R. M. Crawford & C. Gardner
- Attheya septentrionalis (Østrup) Crawford
- Attheya ussurensis Stonik, Orlova & Crawford
- Attheya zachariasii var. curvata P. Rivera
- Attheya zachariasii Brun
