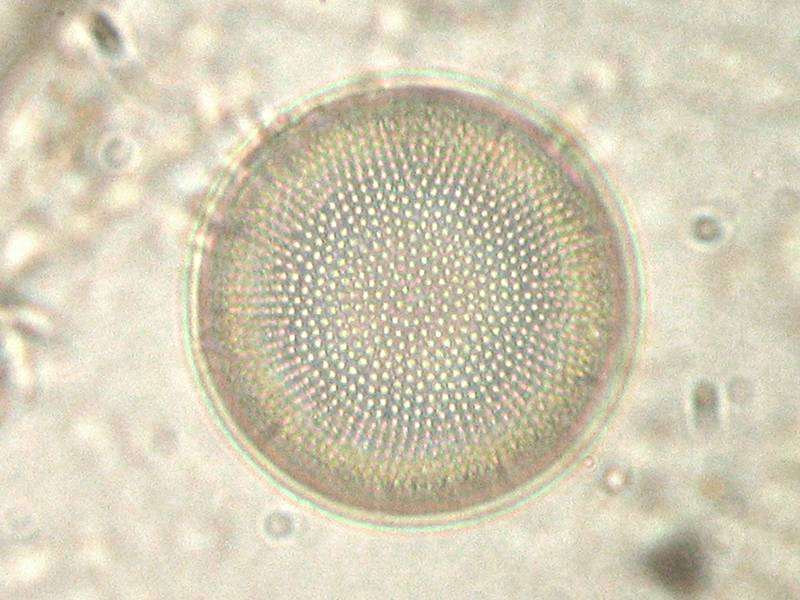
- Actinocyclus normanii, a diatom from the family Hemidiscaceae

Scientific classification
- Domain: Eukaryota
- Clade: Sar
- Clade: Stramenopiles
- Phylum: Ochrophyta
- Clade: Diatomeae
- Class: Coscinodiscophyceae
- Subclass: Coscinodiscophycidae

Superorders
- Biddulphianae; Chaetocerotanae; Corethranae; Coscinodiscanae; Cymatosirophycanae; Lithodesmiophycanae; Rhizosolenianae; Thalassiosiranae

Synonyms
- Coscinodiscineae

= Coscinodiscophycidae =

Order of single-celled organisms

Coscinodiscophycidae is a subclass of diatoms, previously known as "Centrales", a paraphyletic order of centric diatoms, a major group of algae and one of the most common members of the phytoplankton.

== Families ==
- Thalassiossiraceae
- Melosiraceae
- Leptocylindraceae
- Coscinodiscaceae
- Stellarimaceae
- Hemidiscaceae
- Asterolampraceae
- Heliopeltaceae

== Description ==
Valves generally have a marginal ring of processes. They usually have symmetry with no polarities.

== See also ==
- Biddulphiineae
