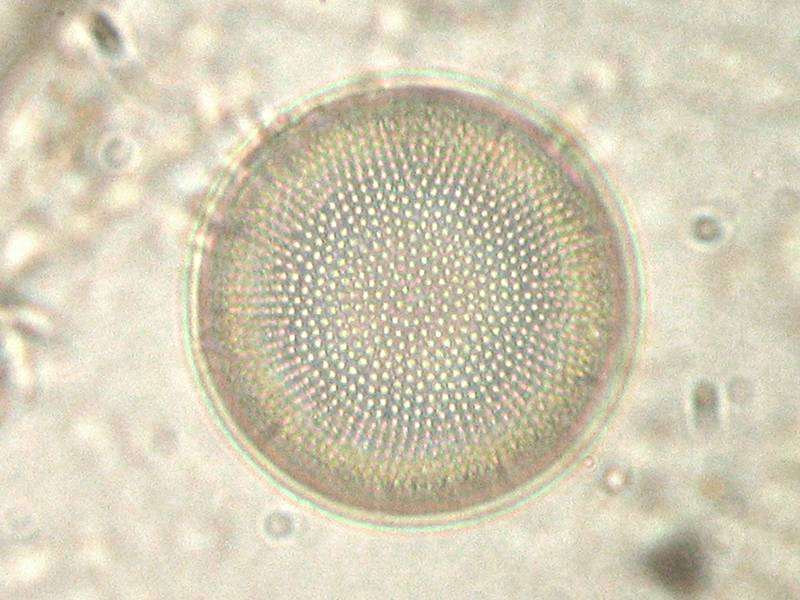

Scientific classification
- Domain: Eukaryota
- Clade: Sar
- Clade: Stramenopiles
- Phylum: Ochrophyta
- Clade: Diatomeae
- Class: Bacillariophyceae
- Order: Coscinodiscales
- Family: Hemidiscaceae
- Genus: Actinocyclus
- Species: A. normanii

Binomial name
- Actinocyclus normanii (W. Gregory) Hustedt, 1957

Synonyms
- Coscinodiscus normanii; Coscinodiscus subtilis var. normanii

= Actinocyclus normanii =

Species of single-celled organism

Actinocyclus normanii is a microalga, a species of planktonic centric diatom. It is a marine species that is also found in brackish and eutrophic fresh water. It is considered an invasive species in the United States.

== Description ==
Actinocyclus normanii is cylindrical with two valves or frustules. It is a large diatom, with valves ranging from 16 to 48 μm in diameter and a mantle depth of 4.5-6 μm. It contains disc-shaped chloroplasts for photosynthesis. The silica-rich framework of the test is bullulate (bubbly). The valves are perforated by hexagonal areolae (pores) forming a radiating pattern of straight rows. The margin of each valve has four to eight processes and a small, knob-like outgrowth called a pseudonodulus. One valve is concave and the other convex. The mantle typically bears labiate (lip-shaped) processes.

== Distribution and habitat ==
Actinocyclus normanii probably originated as a marine species from the Baltic Sea, the coasts of Norway and Germany and the Caspian Sea. It has been found in fresh water in inland Germany. It is also found in the north west Atlantic Ocean, in the Gulf of Maine and the Bay of Fundy. It has been found in Narmada river at the distance of 50 km from gulf of Khambat, Gujarat, India. The form Actinocyclus normanii f. subsalsus is considered an invading species in the Great Lakes where it was probably introduced in about 1938 in ballast water.

== Ecology ==
Actinocyclus normanii var. normanii is typically a marine species but Actinocyclus normanii f. subsalsus is found in the brackish water of estuaries and tidal rivers. It is tolerant of high pH levels, pollution and high levels of nutrients and tends to move to adjacent fresh water sites if they experience an increase in nutrient levels or salinity. In the Great Lakes it tends to inhabit bays and shallows. It thrives at 20 °C and can cause blooms in the summer and early autumn.
