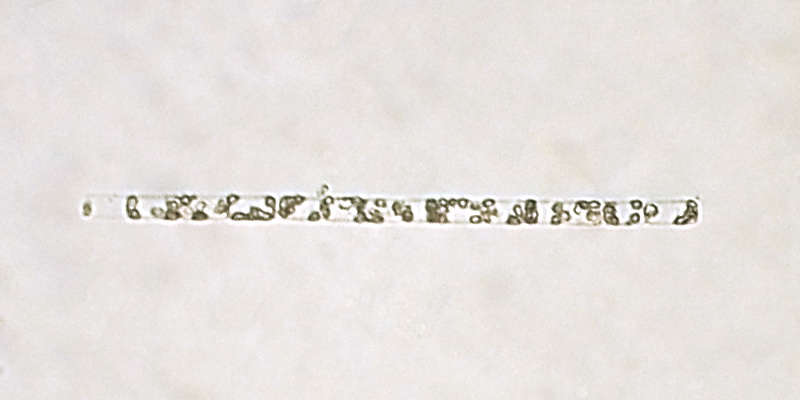
- Dactyliosolen fragilissimus

Scientific classification
- Domain: Eukaryota
- Clade: Diaphoretickes
- Clade: SAR
- Clade: Stramenopiles
- Phylum: Gyrista
- Subphylum: Ochrophytina
- Class: Bacillariophyceae
- Order: Rhizosoleniales
- Family: Rhizosoleniaceae
- Genus: Dactyliosolen; Castracane, 1886

= Dactyliosolen =

Genus of algae

Dactyliosolen is a genus of diatoms belonging to the family Rhizosoleniaceae.

Species:

- Dactyliosolen alternans Hensen
- Dactyliosolen antarcticus Castracane
- Dactyliosolen areolatus Heiden
