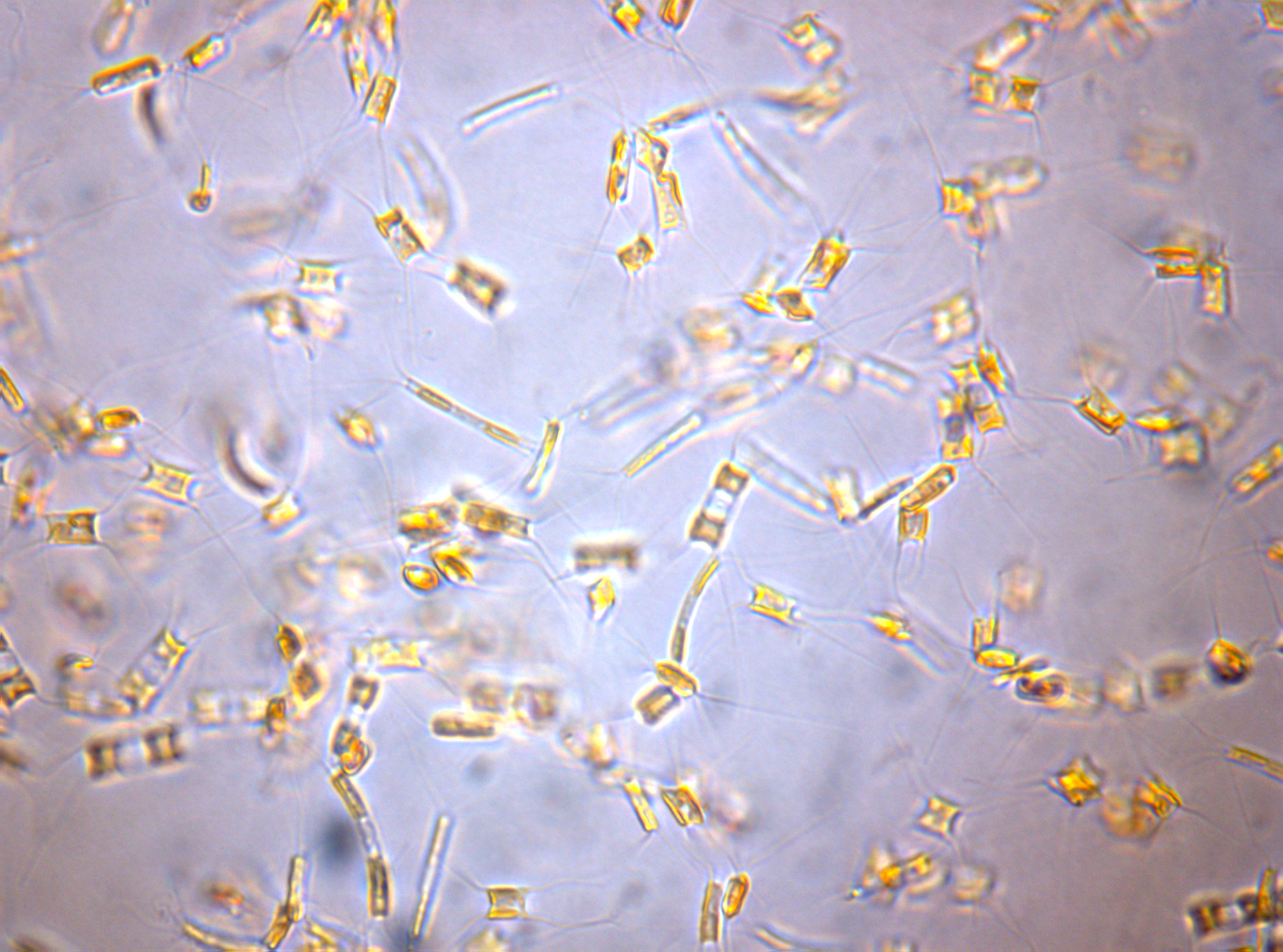

Scientific classification
- Domain: Eukaryota
- Clade: Diaphoretickes
- Clade: SAR
- Clade: Stramenopiles
- Phylum: Gyrista
- Subphylum: Ochrophytina
- Class: Bacillariophyceae
- Order: incertae sedis
- Family: Attheyaceae
- Genus: Attheya
- Species: A. longicornis

Binomial name
- Attheya longicornis (Gardner & Crawford, 1994)

= Attheya longicornis =

Species of single-celled organism

Attheya longicornis is a species of diatoms in the genus Attheya. Type material was collected from Penberth, Cornwall in England.
