= Lithodesmium =

Scientific classification
- Domain: Eukaryota
- Clade: Diaphoretickes
- Clade: SAR
- Clade: Stramenopiles
- Phylum: Gyrista
- Subphylum: Ochrophytina
- Class: Bacillariophyceae
- Order: Lithodesmiales
- Family: Lithodesmiaceae
- Genus: Lithodesmium; C.G.Ehrenberg, 1839

Genus of algae

Lithodesmium is a genus of diatoms belonging to the family Lithodesmiaceae.

The genus has cosmopolitan distribution.

== Species ==
Species:

- Lithodesmium africanum Leuduger-Fortmorel, 1898
- Lithodesmium asketogonium Barron, 1975
- Lithodesmium biceps H.Peragallo, 1909
- Lithodesmium californicum Grunow, 1883
- Lithodesmium contractum L.W.Bailey, 1861
- Lithodesmium cornigerum J.Brun, 1896
- Lithodesmium duckerae Von Stosch, 1987
- Lithodesmium ehrenbergii Forti
- Lithodesmium hirtum (Ehrenberg)
- Lithodesmium margaritaceum Long, Fuge & Smith, 1946
- Lithodesmium minusculum
- Lithodesmium pliocenicum Schrader, 1973
- Lithodesmium reynoldsii Barron, 1976
- Lithodesmium rotunda Schrader, 1976
- Lithodesmium undulatum Ehrenberg, 1839
- Lithodesmium variabile Takano, 1979
- Lithodesmium victoriae Karsten, 1906
