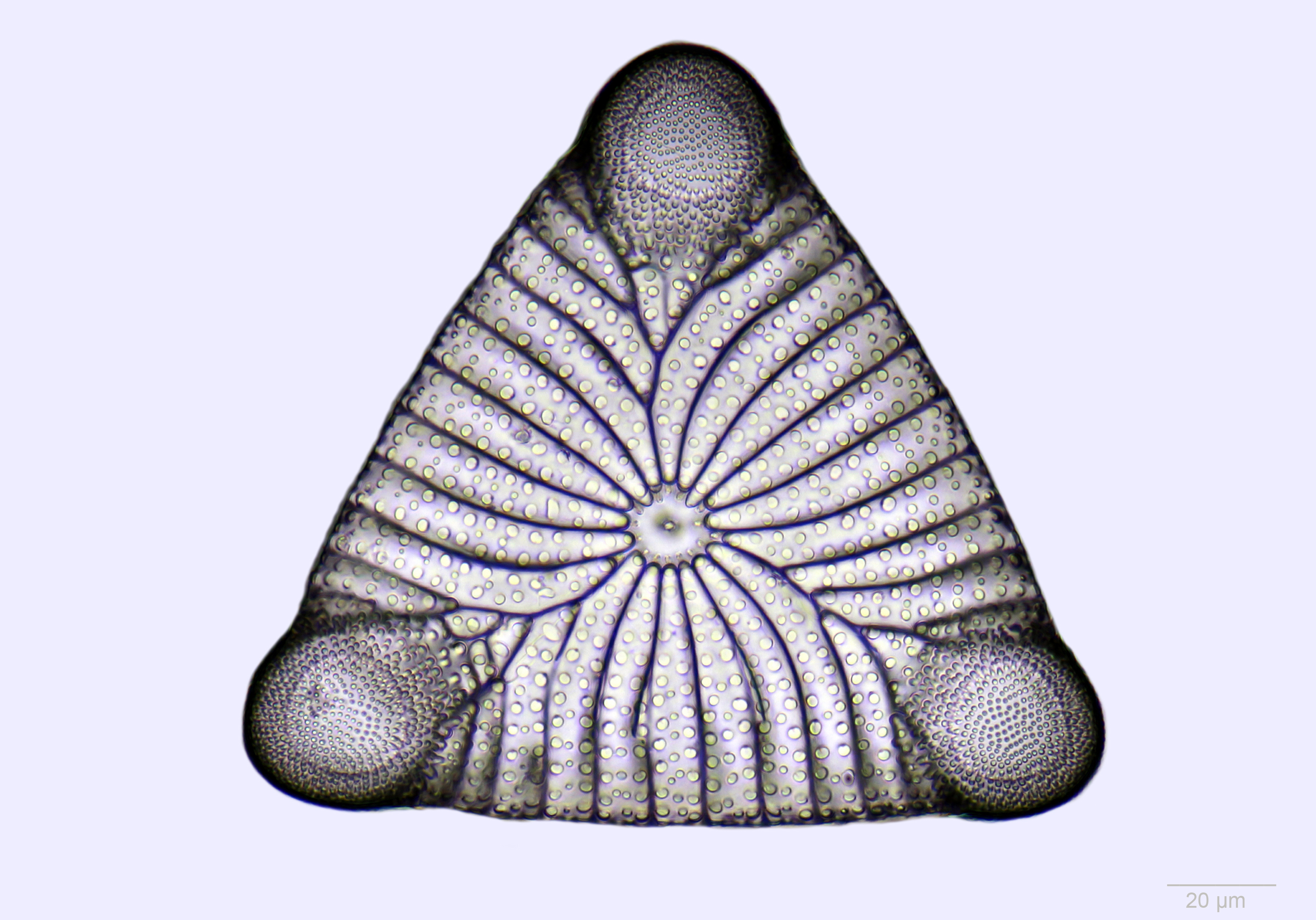
- Fossil of Triceratium polycystinorum

Scientific classification
- Domain: Eukaryota
- Clade: Sar
- Clade: Stramenopiles
- Phylum: Bacillariophyta
- Class: Coscinodiscophyceae
- Subclass: Coscinodiscophycidae
- Superorder: Biddulphianae
- Order: Triceratiales

Suborders
- Plagiogrammaceae; Triceratiaceae

= Triceratiales =

Proposed order of diatoms

Triceratiales is a order of diatoms.
