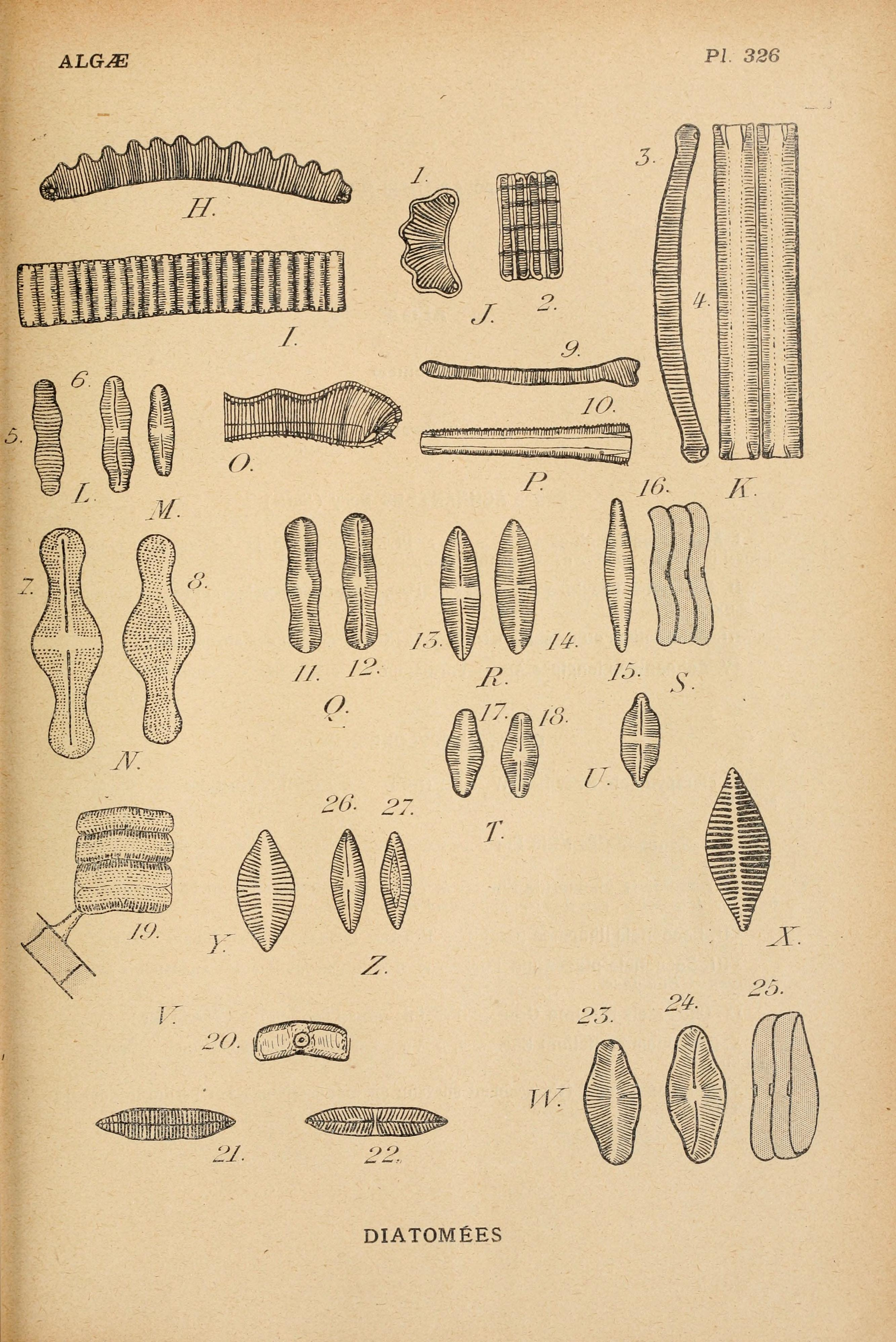
- Album général des Cryptogames, Pl. 326.

Scientific classification
- Domain: Eukaryota
- Clade: Sar
- Clade: Stramenopiles
- Division: Ochrophyta
- Clade: Bacillariophyta
- Class: Bacillariophyceae
- Order: Bacillariales
- Family: Achnanthaceae
- Genus: Achnanthes de Saint-Vincent, 1822

Extant species
- See text

= Achnanthes =

Genus of diatoms

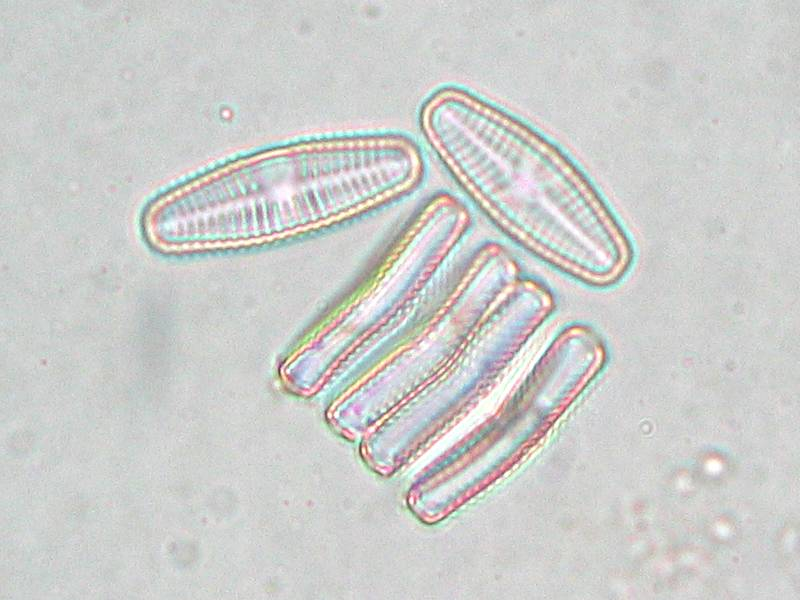
Achnanthes lanceolata

Achnanthes is a genus of diatoms belonging to the family Achnanthaceae.

The genus was described in 1822 by Jean Baptiste Bory de Saint-Vincent.

The genus has cosmopolitan distribution.

Species:

- Achnanthes aapajaervensis Cleve-Euler
- Achnanthes abundans Manguin, 1954
- Achnanthes acares Hohn & Hellerman
- Achnanthes acus Simonsen
- Achnanthes acuta Frenguelli
