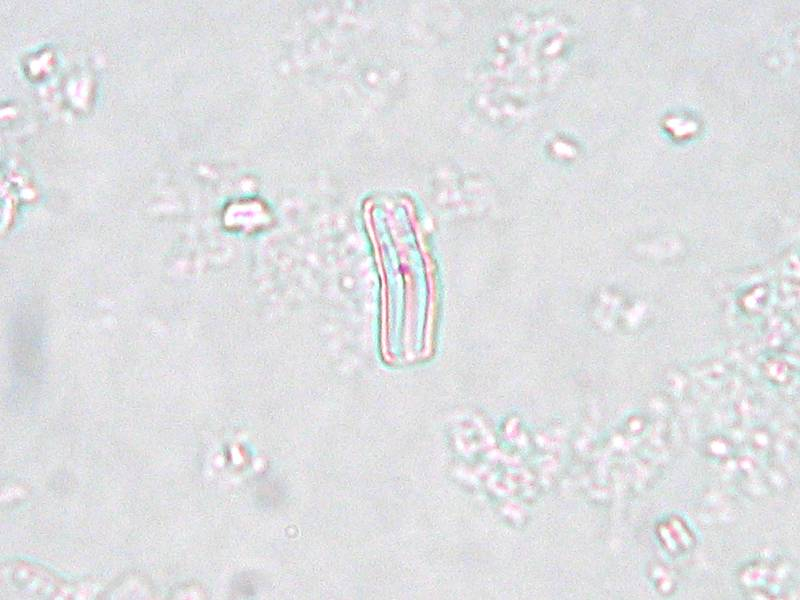
- Achnanthidium

Scientific classification
- Domain: Eukaryota
- Supergroup: Stramenopiles
- Division: Ochrophyta
- Clade: Bacillariophyta
- Class: Bacillariophyceae
- Order: Cocconeidales
- Family: Achnanthidiaceae
- Genus: Achnanthidium; Kützing, 1844

Extant species
- See text

= Achnanthidium =

Genus of diatoms

Achnanthidium is a genus of diatoms belonging to the family Achnanthidiaceae.

The genus was described in 1844 by Friedrich Traugott Kützing.

The genus has cosmopolitan distribution.

Species: (see a more complete list)

- Achnanthidium affine (Grunow) Czarnecki, 1994
- Achnanthidium agardhii (Kützing) Mereschkowsky
- Achnanthidium alpestre (R. Lowe & J.P. Kociolek) R. Lowe & J.P. Kociolek
- Achnanthidium minutissimum (Kützing) Czarnecki
