= Cymatosiraceae =

Scientific classification
- Domain: Eukaryota
- Clade: Diaphoretickes
- Clade: SAR
- Clade: Stramenopiles
- Phylum: Gyrista
- Subphylum: Ochrophytina
- Class: Bacillariophyceae
- Order: Cymatosirales
- Family: Cymatosiraceae; Hasle, von Stosch & Syvertsen, 1983

Type genus
- Cymatosira Grunow (1862)

Genera
- See text

Family of single-celled organisms

Cymatosiraceae is a family of diatoms in the order Cymatosirales.

== Genera ==
Arcocellulus – Brockmanniella – Campylosira – Cymatosira – Cymatosirella – Extubocellulus – Hyalinella – †Kisseleviella – †Koizumia – Lennoxia – Leyanella – Minutocellulus – Minutocellus – Papiliocellulus – Pierrecomperia – Plagiogrammopsis – Pseudoleyanella – Syvertsenia
