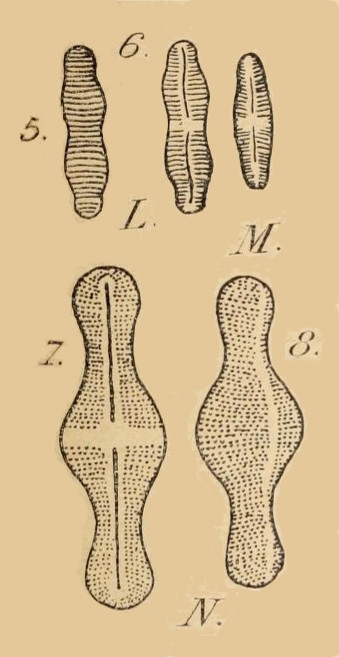
- L. Achnanthidium coarctatum ; M. A. anceolatum; N. A. inflatum

Scientific classification
- Domain: Eukaryota
- Clade: Diaphoretickes
- Clade: SAR
- Clade: Stramenopiles
- Phylum: Gyrista
- Subphylum: Ochrophytina
- Class: Bacillariophyceae
- Order: Achnanthales
- Family: Achnanthidiaceae; D.G.Mann, 1990

Genera
- See text

= Achnanthidiaceae =

Family of diatoms

Achnanthidiaceae is a family of diatoms in the order Achnanthales. It contains 461 species within 22 genera.

== Genera ==
The following genera are accepted within Achnanthidiaceae according to AlgaeBase.

- Achnanthidium
- Astartiella
- Crenotia
- Eucocconeis
- Gliwiczia
- Gogorevia
- Gololobovia
- Gomphothidium
- Haloroundia
- Karayevia
- Kolbesia
- Lemnicola
- Madinithidium
- Majewskaea
- Planothidium
- Platebaikalia
- Platessa
- Psammothidium
- Pseudachnanthidium
- Rossithidium
- Skabitschewskia
- Trifonovia
