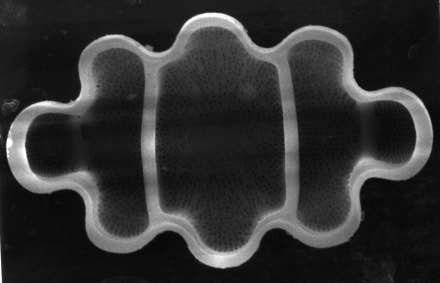
- Terpsinoë americana

Scientific classification
- Domain: Eukaryota
- Clade: Sar
- Clade: Stramenopiles
- Division: Ochrophyta
- Clade: Diatomeae
- Class: Mediophyceae
- Order: Anaulales
- Family: Anaulaceae
- Genus: Terpsinoë; Ehrenberg, 1843

Species
- Terpsinoë americana; Terpsinoë javanicum; Terpsinoë musica

= Terpsinoë =

Genus of single-celled organisms

Terpsinoë is a genus of diatom. Species include T. americana, T. javanicum, and T. musica.
