= Linda Medlin =

Phytoplankton ecologist

- Education: Texas A&M University
- Scientific career
- Thesis: Community analysis of epiphytic diatoms from selected species of macroalgae collected along the Texas coast of the Gulf of Mexico (1983)

Linda Karen Medlin is a molecular biologist known for her work on diatoms. She is an elected member of the Norwegian Academy of Science and Letters.

== Education and career ==
Medlin has a B.S. from the University of Texas at Austin (1970), and an M.S. (1977) and a Ph.D.(1983) from Texas A&M University. She has worked at the Alfred-Wegener-Institute in Germany (1991-2009), Observatoire océanologique de Banyuls-sur-Mer in France (2009-2013), and the company Microbia Environment in France (2013-2016). From 2008-2025, she was an associate research fellow at the Marine Biological Association. She presently holds two honorary visiting professorships: one at the University of Liverpool and the other at Aberystwyth University.

== Research ==
Medlin's early work was with Greta Fryxell on the taxonomy of diatoms. She is known for her work on applying molecular tools to the study of phytoplankton, and she was the first to develop primers for polymerase chain reaction that targeted eukaryotic organisms, She applied this tool to taxonomic studies of multiple species of phytoplankton cultured in the laboratory. Her work extended into the ocean where she examined the diversity of phytoplankton in different regions including the Pacific Ocean, Antarctica, and the time series from the German research station at Heligoland. Through the application of molecular tools, Medlin was able to define species differences in coccolithophores and examine the evolution of diatoms. In 2007, Medlin led the group who discovered a new lineage within photosynthetic eukaryotic organisms, the picobiliphytes, and then presented the first cultured strain in 2013 but the group is not photosynthetic but heterotrophic and feeds primarily on cryptomonads and may keep their plastids, hence the chartarcteristic pigments first associated with the group. More recently. Medlin has worked on the phytoplankton within harmful algal blooms and improving methods for monitoring such blooms using DNA barcodes as probes in electrochemical biosensors.

== Selected publications ==
- Medlin, Linda; Elwood, Hille J.; Stickel, Shawn; Sogin, Mitchell L. (1988-11-30). "The characterization of enzymatically amplified eukaryotic 16S-like rRNA-coding regions". Gene. 71 (2): 491–499. doi:10.1016/0378-1119(88)90066-2. ISSN 0378-1119. PMID 3224833.
- Bowler, Chris; Allen, Andrew E. (2008). "The Phaeodactylum genome reveals the evolutionary history of diatom genomes". Nature. 456 (7219): 239–244. Bibcode:2008Natur.456..239B. doi:10.1038/nature07410. ISSN 0028-0836. PMID 18923393. S2CID 4415177.
- Sims, Patricia A.; Mann, David G.; Medlin, Linda K. (2006-07-01). "Evolution of the diatoms: insights from fossil, biological and molecular data". Phycologia. 45 (4): 361–402. Bibcode:2006Phyco..45..361S. doi:10.2216/05-22.1. ISSN 0031-8884. S2CID 55058077.
- Medlin, Linda K.; Kaczmarska, Irena (2004-05-01). "Evolution of the diatoms: V. Morphological and cytological support for the major clades and a taxonomic revision". Phycologia. 43 (3): 245–270. Bibcode:2004Phyco..43..245M. doi:10.2216/i0031-8884-43-3-245.1. ISSN 0031-8884. S2CID 83631828.
- Medlin, Linda; Simon, Nathalie (1998), "Phylogenetic Analysis of Marine Phytoplankton", in Cooksey, Keith E. (ed.), Molecular Approaches to the Study of the Ocean, Dordrecht: Springer Netherlands, pp. 161–186, doi:10.1007/978-94-011-4928-0_7, ISBN 978-94-010-6067-7

== Awards and honors ==
Medlin was elected foreign member of Norwegian Academy of Science and Letters in 1998. Four of Medlin's papers have received awards, one paper received the Luigi Provasoli award from the Phycological Society of America, and three papers have received the Tyge Christensen Award from the International Phycological Society. Medlin received the Yasumoto Lifetime Achievement Award from the International Society for the Study of Harmful Algae in 2021.
