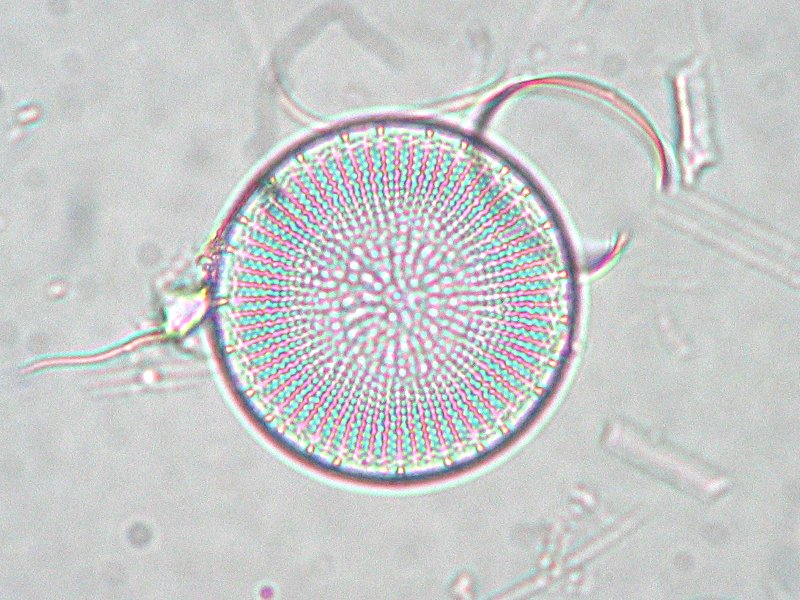
- Stephanodiscus neoastraea

Scientific classification
- Domain: Eukaryota
- Clade: Sar
- Clade: Stramenopiles
- Phylum: Ochrophyta
- Clade: Diatomeae
- Class: Mediophyceae
- Order: Thalassiosirales
- Family: Stephanodiscaceae; Makarova

= Stephanodiscaceae =

Family of algae

Stephanodiscaceae is a family of diatoms belonging to the order Stephanodiscales.

Genera include:

- Brevisira Krammer
- Concentrodiscus G.C.Khursevich, A.I.Moisseeva & G.A.Sukhova
- Crateriportula Flower & Håkansson
- Cribrionella Jovanovska, Cvetkoska, Tofilovska, Ognjanova-Rumenova & Levkov
- Cyclocostis Paillès
- Cyclostephanopsis Loginova
- Cyclostephanos Round
- Cyclotella (Kützing) Brébisson
- Cyclotubicoalitus Stoermer, E.F.Kociolek & W.Cody
- Dimidialimbus H.Tanaka & T.Nagumo
- Discotella V.Houk & R.Klee
- Edtheriotia Kociolek, Q.M.You, Stepanek, R.L.Lowe et Q-X. Wang
