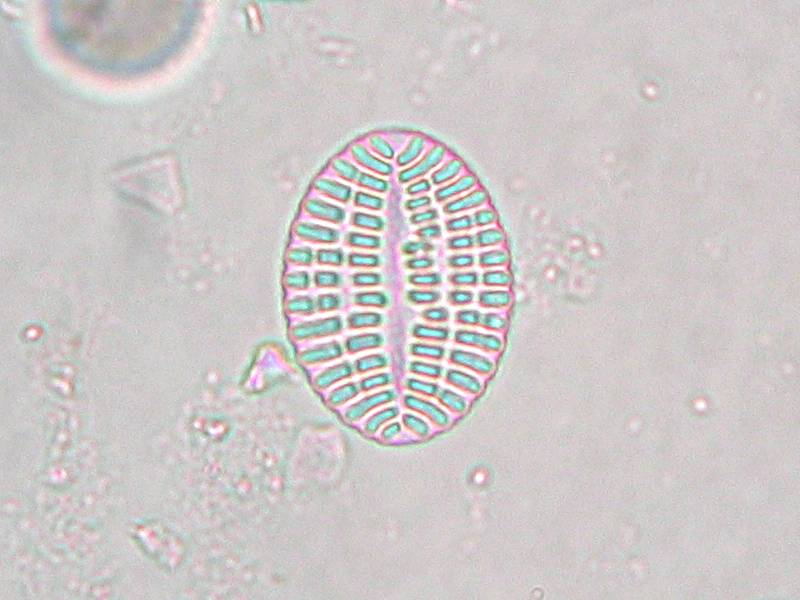
- Cocconeis duplex

Scientific classification
- Domain: Eukaryota
- Clade: Diaphoretickes
- Clade: SAR
- Clade: Stramenopiles
- Phylum: Gyrista
- Subphylum: Ochrophytina
- Class: Bacillariophyceae
- Subclass: Bacillariophycidae
- Superorder: Bacillariophycanae
- Order: Achnanthales; Silva, 1962

Families
- Achnanthaceae; Achnanthidiaceae; Cocconeidaceae

= Achnanthales =

Order of single-celled organisms

Achnanthales is an order of diatoms.
