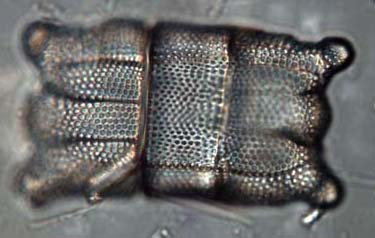
- Biddulphia pulchella

Scientific classification
- Domain: Eukaryota
- Clade: Sar
- Clade: Stramenopiles
- Division: Ochrophyta
- Clade: Bacillariophyta
- Class: Biddulphiophyceae
- Order: Biddulphiales
- Family: Biddulphiaceae
- Genus: Biddulphia; S.F. Gray, 1821

= Biddulphia =

Genus of diatoms

Biddulphia is a genus of diatoms within the clade Biddulphiophycidae.
