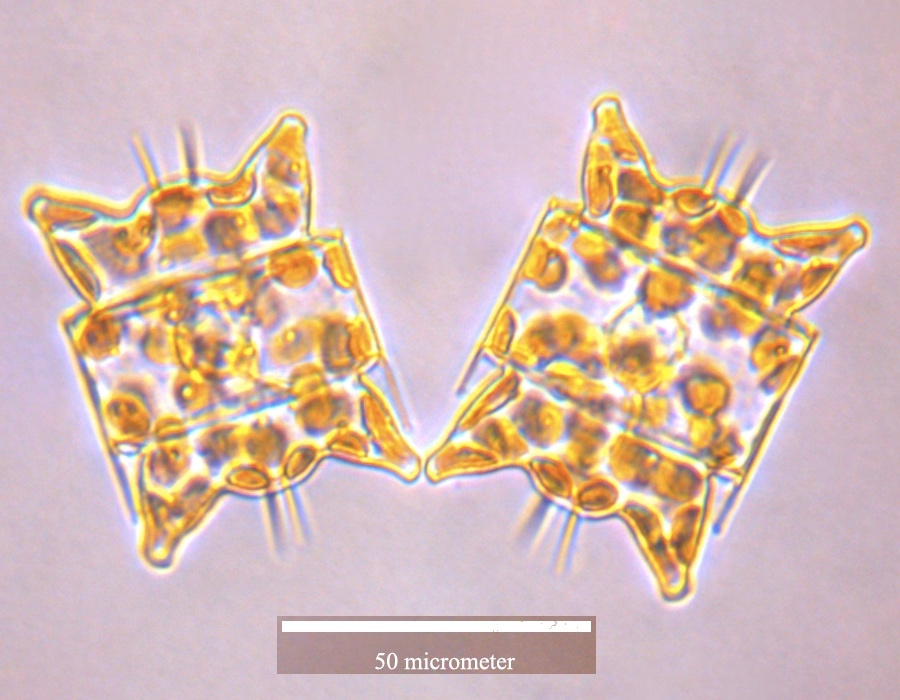
- Odontella aurita

Scientific classification
- Domain: Eukaryota
- Clade: Sar
- Clade: Stramenopiles
- Division: Ochrophyta
- Clade: Diatomeae
- Class: Mediophyceae
- Order: Eupodiscales
- Family: Odontellaceae
- Genus: Odontella; C.A. Agardh, 1832

= Odontella (diatom) =

Genus of algae

Odontella is a genus of marine diatoms. Some sources place it in the family Triceratiaceae, others in the family Odontellaceae. It contains the following species:

- Odontella aurita (Lyngbye) C. A. Agardh
- Odontella calamus (Brun & Tempère) H. J. Schrader
- Odontella cornuta (J. Brun) H. J. Schrader
- Odontella granulata (Roper) R. Ross
- Odontella hastata (Greville) J. Fenner ex D. M. Williams
- Odontella litigiosa (Van Heurck) Hoban
- Odontella longicruris (Greville) Hoban
- Odontella mobiliensis (J. W. Bailey) Grunow
- Odontella regia (Schultze) Simonsen
- Odontella rhombus
- Odontella septentrionalis H. J. Schrader
- Odontella sinensis (Greville) Grunow
- Odontella weissflogii (Janisch) Grunow

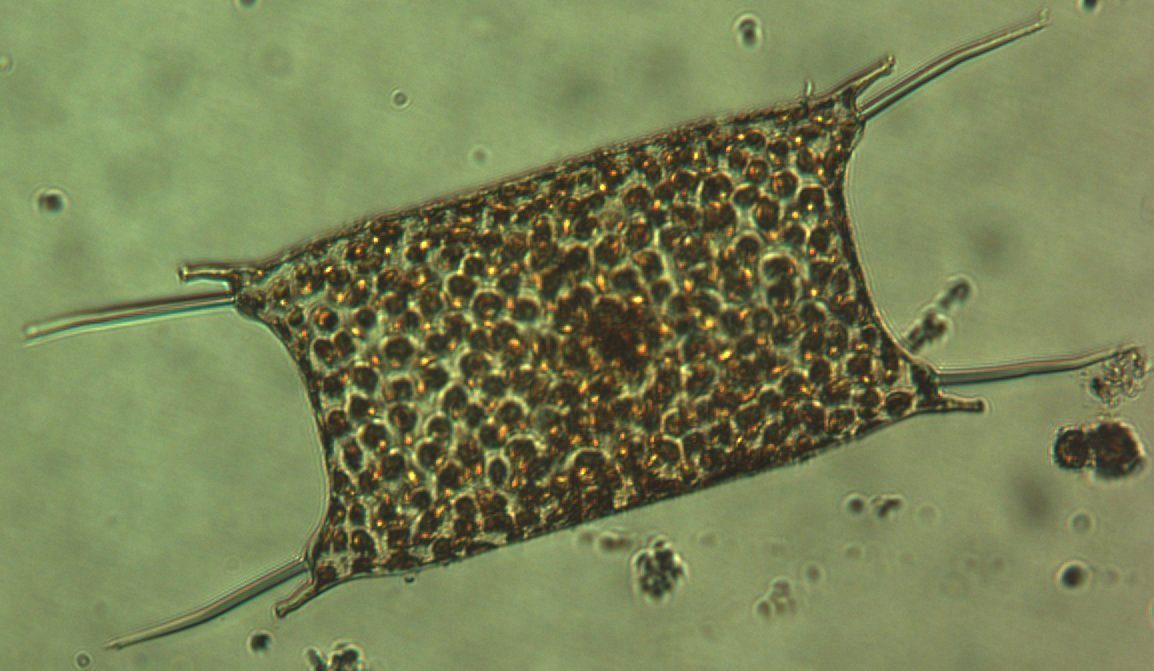
Odontella mobiliensis
