= Cymatosirales =

Scientific classification
- Domain: Eukaryota
- Clade: Diaphoretickes
- Clade: SAR
- Clade: Stramenopiles
- Phylum: Gyrista
- Subphylum: Ochrophytina
- Class: Bacillariophyceae
- Subclass: Coscinodiscophycidae
- Superorder: Cymatosirophycanae
- Order: Cymatosirales; Round & Crawford, 1990

Families
- Cymatosiraceae; Rutilariaceae

Order of single-celled organisms

Cymatosirales is an order of diatoms, the only order in the superorder Cymatosirophycanae of the subclass Coscinodiscophycidae.
