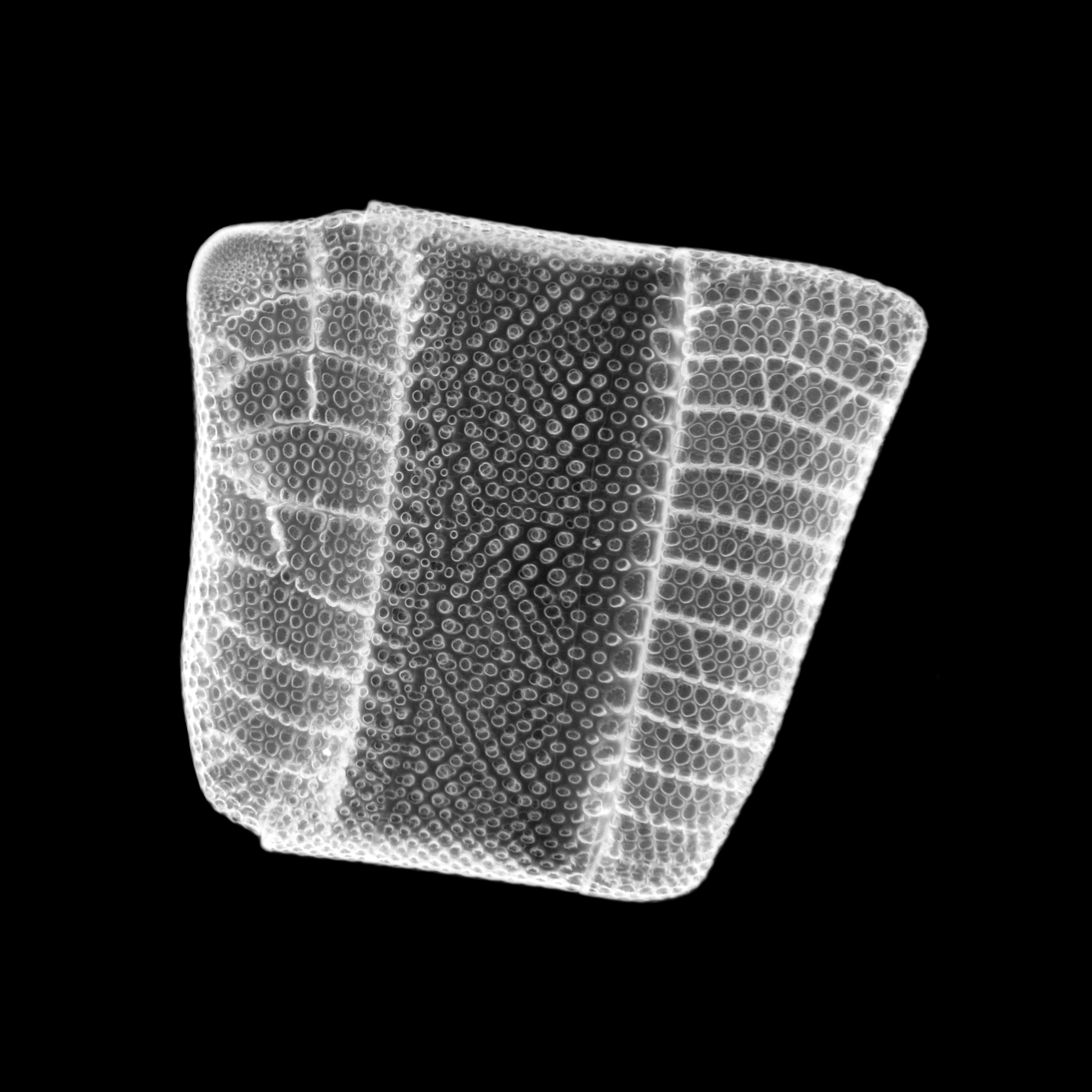
- Isthmia nervosa

Scientific classification
- Domain: Eukaryota
- Supergroup: Stramenopiles
- Division: Ochrophyta
- Clade: Bacillariophyta
- Class: Coscinodiscophyceae; F.E. Round & R.M. Crawford

Subclasses
- Biddulphiophycidae; Chaetocerotophycidae; Corethrophycidae; Coscinodiscophycidae; Cymatosirophycidae; Lithodesmiophycidae; Rhizosoleniophycidae; Thalassiosirophycidae

= Coscinodiscophyceae =

Class of diatoms

The Coscinodiscophyceae are a class of diatoms. They are similar to the Centrales, a traditional, paraphyletic subdivision of the heterokont algae known as diatoms. The order is named for the shape of the cell walls (or valves or frustules) of centric diatoms, which are circular or ellipsoid in valve view. The valves often bear radially symmetrical ornamental patterns that can appear as dots when viewed with an optical microscope. Some also bear spines on their valves, which may either increase cell surface area and reduce sinking, or act as a deterrent to zooplankton grazers. Unlike pennate diatoms, centric diatoms never have a raphe.

In terms of cell cycle, vegetative cells are diploid and undergo mitosis during normal cell division. In sexual species, oogamous meiosis produces haploid gametes, either ova or sperm cells. These fuse to produce a zygote which expands in size to develop into an auxospore from which full-sized vegetative cells are produced.

In some taxonomy schemes, the centric diatoms are known instead as order Coscinodiscophyceae, and in some schemes as order Biddulphiales. However, diatom taxonomy is changing due to the development of new molecular and genetic analysis tools.

== See also ==
- Pennales
