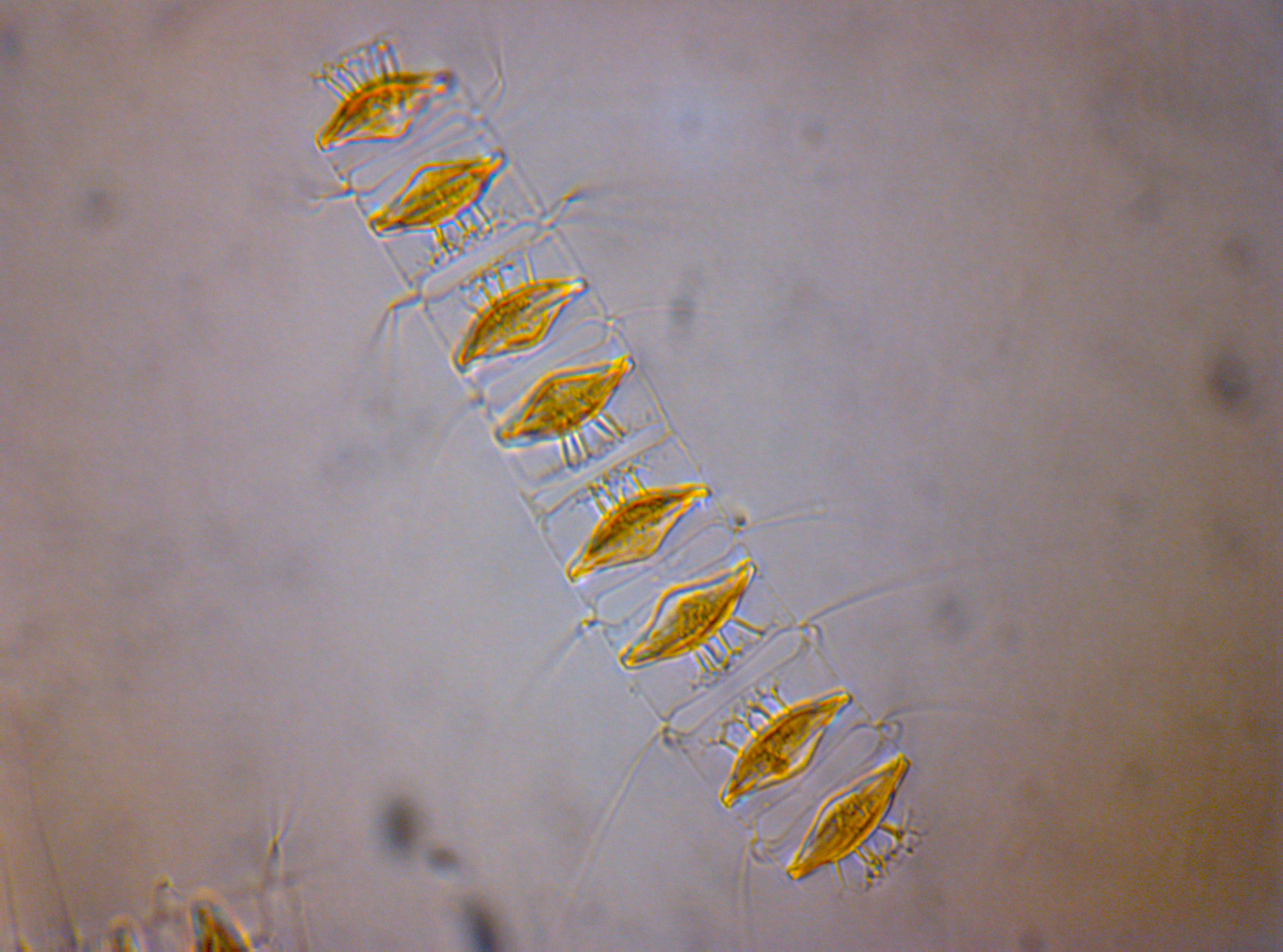
- Chaetoceros diadema

Scientific classification
- Domain: Eukaryota
- Clade: Sar
- Clade: Stramenopiles
- Division: Ochrophyta
- Clade: Diatomeae
- Class: Mediophyceae
- Subclass: Chaetocerotophycidae; Round & R.M. Crawford in Round et al. 1990, emend. Adl et al. 2019

Genera
- Chaetoceros; Bacteriastrum; Dactyliosolen; Cerataulina; Hemiaulus; Eucampia; Acanthoceras; Urosolenia; Terpsinoë; Hydrosera

= Chaetocerotophycidae =

Order of single-celled organisms

Chaetocerotophycidae is a grouping of Mediophyceae.
