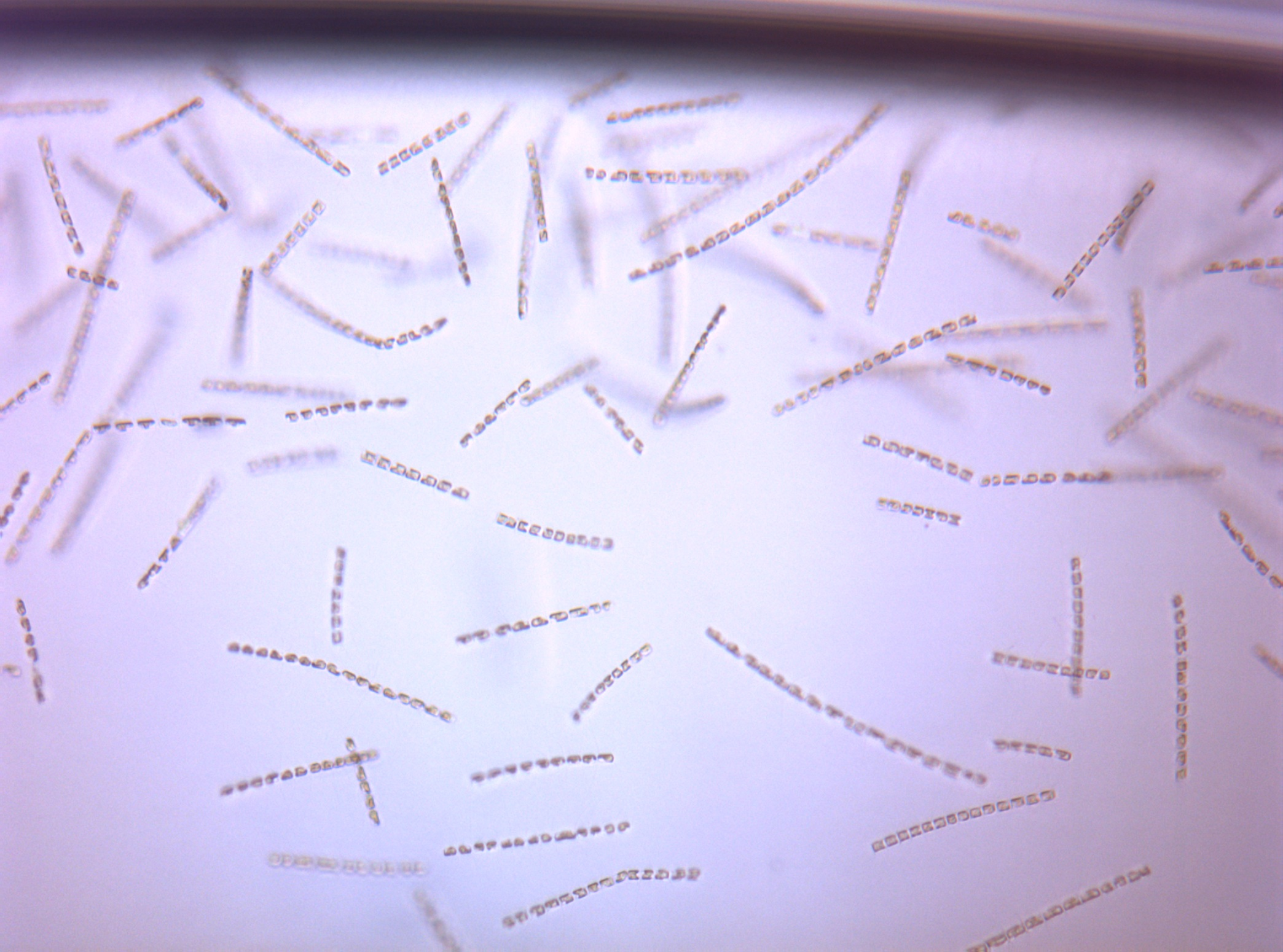

Scientific classification
- Domain: Eukaryota
- Clade: Sar
- Clade: Stramenopiles
- Division: Ochrophyta
- Clade: Bacillariophyta
- Class: Thalassiosirophyceae
- Order: Chaetocerotales
- Family: Chaetocerotaceae
- Genus: Chaetoceros
- Species: C. furcellatus

Binomial name
- Chaetoceros furcellatus (Bailey, 1856)

= Chaetoceros furcellatus =

Species of single-celled organism

Chaetoceros furcellatus is an Arctic neritic diatom in the genus Chaetoceros. The easiest way to identify this species is by finding the very characteristic resting spores. C. furcellatus is a common and important species in the Barents Sea.

== Species description ==
Cells united into chains that can be long and slightly curved. Valve face is flat to slightly concave with a central inflation. The setae originate inside the valve margin. Resting spores occur in pairs fused by a basal plate, one setae sticks out on each side of the pair, perpendicular to the chain axis, and splits in two, half a cell length from the valve margin
