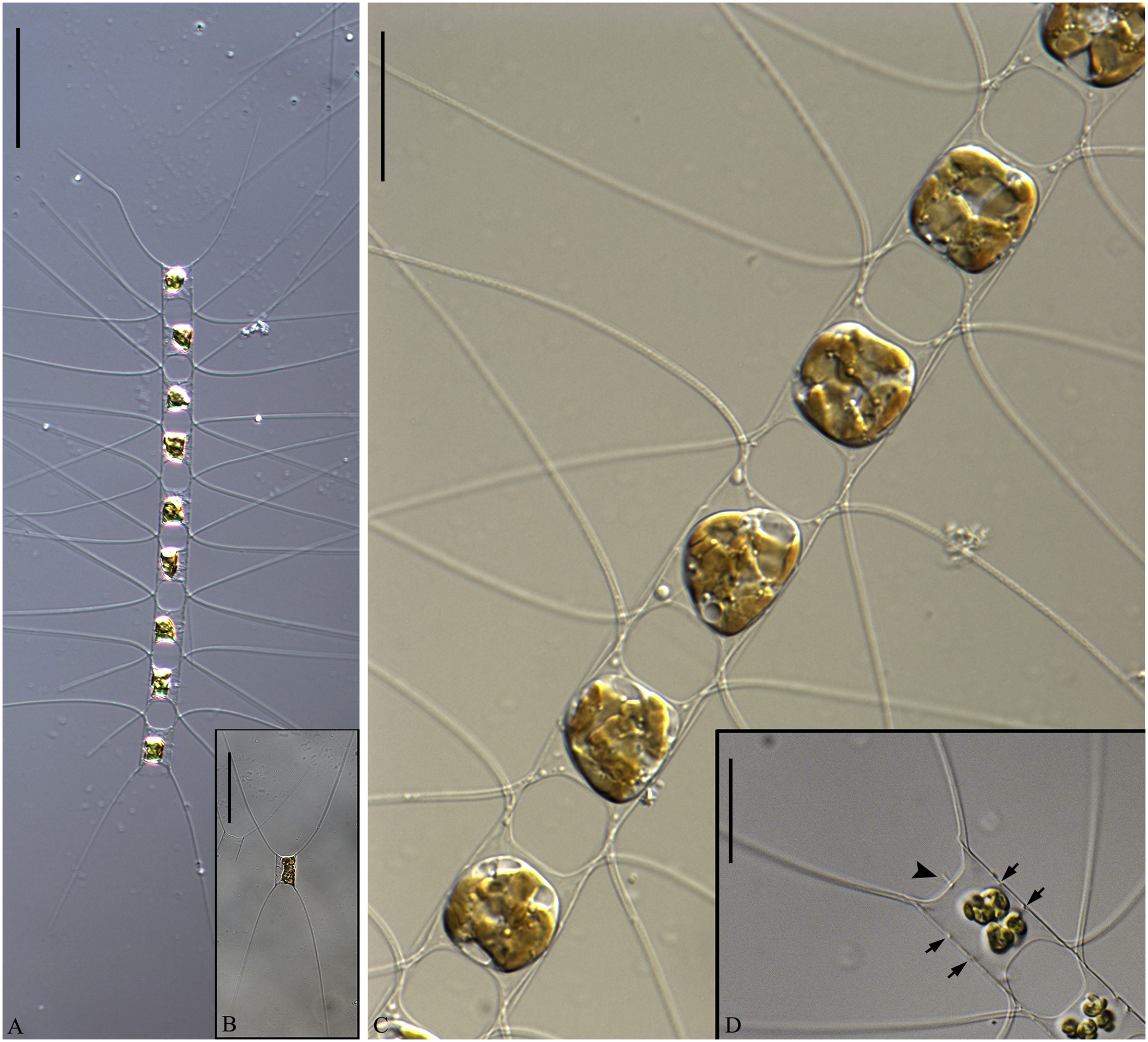

Scientific classification
- Domain: Eukaryota
- Clade: Sar
- Clade: Stramenopiles
- Division: Ochrophyta
- Clade: Diatomeae
- Class: Mediophyceae
- Order: Chaetocerotales
- Family: Chaetocerotaceae
- Genus: Chaetoceros
- Species: C. elegans

Binomial name
- Chaetoceros elegans Gutwinski, 1895; Li et al., 2017

= Chaetoceros elegans =

Species of single-celled organism

Chaetoceros elegans is a species of diatom in the family Chaetocerotaceae. According to Li, 2017, the type locality is Dapeng Bay, Guangdong Province, P. R. China.
