= Calcareous nannofossils =

Class of microscopic fossils

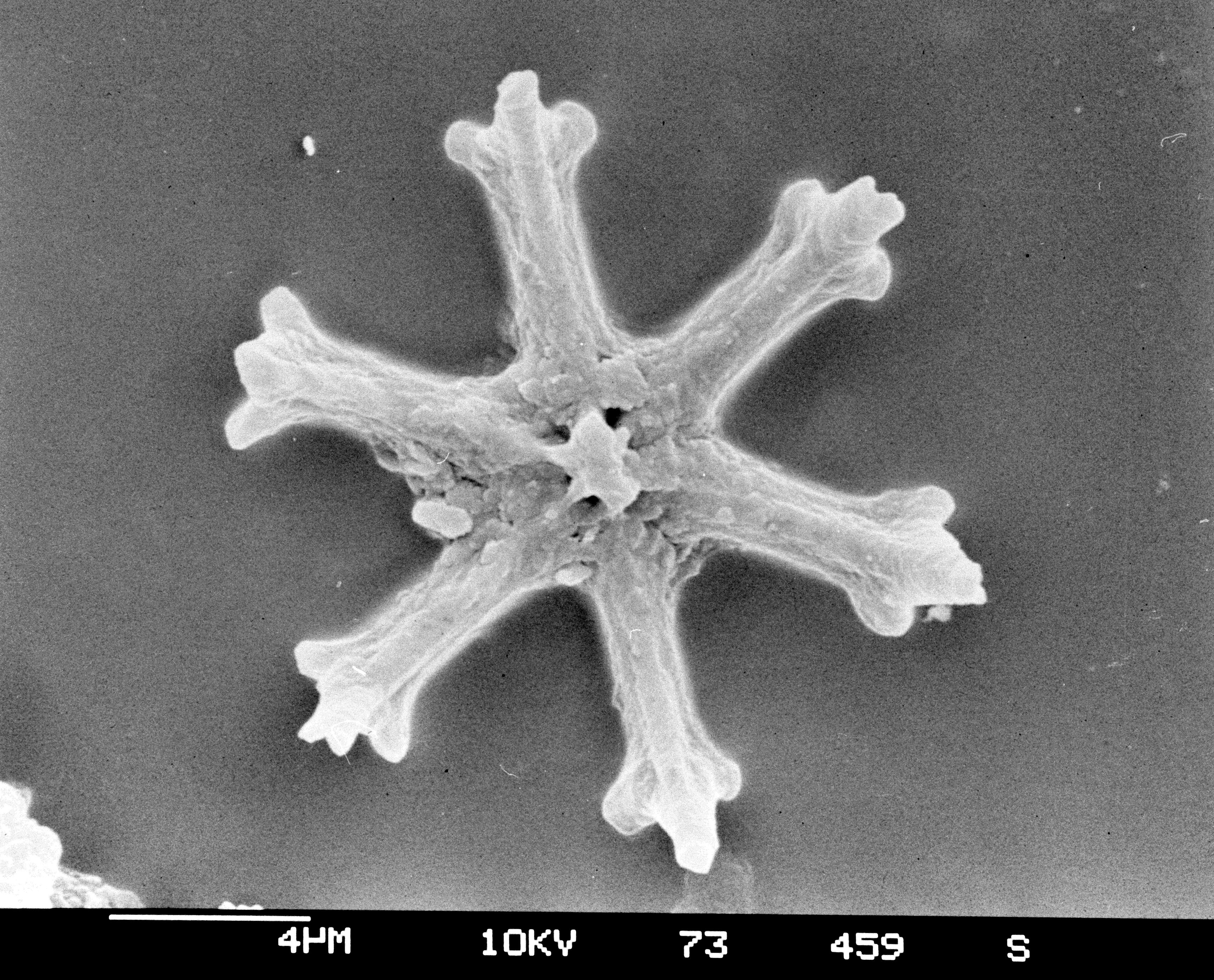
Discoaster surculus fossil, 15 microns across. The extinction of this species officially marks the beginning of the Quaternary period

Calcareous nannofossils are a class of tiny (less than 30 microns in diameter) microfossils that are similar to coccoliths deposited by the modern-day coccolithophores. The nannofossils are a convenient source of geochronological data due to the abundance and rapid evolution of the single-cell organisms forming them (nannoplankton) and the ease of handling of the sediment samples. The practical applications of calcareous nannofossils in the areas of biostratigraphy and paleoecology became clear once deepwater drilling took off in 1968 with the Deep Sea Drilling Project, and they have been extensively studied ever since. Nannofossils provide one of the most important paleontological records, with a continuous history of 220 million years.

== History of research ==
Christian Gottfried Ehrenberg, while examining the chalk from Ruegen, recorded in 1836 an observation of what was later termed "coccolith" and had pictured the coccoliths and Discoasters in his Mikrogeologie (1854), erroneously classifying these discs as a kind of complex spheric concretion. T. H. Huxley coined the term coccoliths in 1858 (due to their shape resembling the Protococcus), while agreeing with their inorganic nature. In 1861 George Charles Wallich and, independently, Henry Clifton Sorby, figured out the organic nature of coccoliths after observing their aggregations, coccospheres. Huxley then changed his views and declared that coccoliths are skeletal elements of an unknown organism, Bathybius haeckelii, a primordial form of organic life. One of the goals of the Challenger expedition was to understand the nature of the Bathybius, but the scientists aboard the ship reached the conclusion that the gel-like substance apparently holding the disks in a coccosphere together was a result of processing the samples and later declared the coccoliths to constitute the defensive armor of tiny nannoplankton algae (the term was coined in 1909 by Hans Lohmann to identify the tiniest plankton, less than 60 microns in size, that passed through the regular phytoplankton nets).

Research of the nannoplankton systematics in the early 20th century (Erwin Kamptner, Georges Deflandre, and Trygve Braarud) enabled M. N. Bramlette and W. R. Riedel to successfully use the nannofossils for biostratigraphy (1954). The Deep Sea Drilling Project (DSDP, 1968) revealed the power of the technique: stratigraphic positions were found within minutes after the drilling core was hauled aboard the ship. At the same time, the continuous DSDP cores provided a solid foundation for setting up the nannofossil biozones. It took decades to establish comprehensive chronological schemes (e.g. Martini 1971; Sissingh 1977; Roth 1978; Okada & Bukry 1980).

The researchers started to use the transmission electron microscopes in the mid-1950s, switching to scanning electron microscopes in the 1960s and 1970s. Optical microscopes with cross-polarization and phase-contrast illumination, techniques introduced in 1952 by Kamptner and Braarud & Nordli respectively, are still used for routine field work.

== Terminology ==
The terminology in the field evolved over time and nannofossils are also sometimes called "nannoplankton" and "coccoliths" as well as some other names, especially in the literature published in 1950s and 1960s. The term "calcareous nannofossil" was chosen in the DSDP publications (although it was rarely used prior to that) and gained popularity afterwards, in the early 1970s. "Calcareous" is derived from Latin: calx, "lime", and means "containing lime".

Siesser & Haq describe the general use as follows:

- coccolith is restricted by some authors to designate round-shaped elements similar to the ones produced by the living coccolithophores. For differently-shaped objects (e. g., stars and horseshoes), nanolith is being used. Some other authors, however, use coccolith in a broader sense for all calcareous nanofossils;
- nannoplankton is sometimes used to identify the living organisms, with nannofossils referring to the now-extinct species. Other researchers use the nannoplankton for all forms, both living and extinct arguing that even though the true taxonomy of the extinct ones might never be known, their planktic way of living is subject to little doubt.

Siesser & Haq themselves use nannoplankton as a generic way to refer to all organisms, whether living or extinct and nannofossils when describing specifically the fossil forms.

== Biostratigraphy ==
Multiple characteristics of the calcareous nannofossils make them a valuable tool of biostratigraphy and biochronology:

- continuous record from 220 million years ago to present;
- abundance in marine sediments;
- worldwide distribution due to the planktonic nature;
- rapid evolution (with diverse morphology) that provides hundreds of points of appearance and extinction;
- tiny size allows the work to be performed with small samples (less than 1 gramm).

The calcareous nannofossils can be found in the deposits that stretch from the Late Triassic to the modern times. The calcareous nannoplankton biodiversity grew in the Jurassic and Cretaceous periods peaking at about 150 species in the Late Cretaceous.

The boundaries of the biozones in stratigraphy are defined by the biohorizons, points in strata where significant changes in fossil content and distribution occur. Typical events used for biohorizons are: first occurrence, last occurrence, change in abundance of taxons. A combination of biozones arranged in stratigraphical order results in a zonation (or scheme).

The first Cenozoic biozonation with 21 biozones for Neogene and 25 biozones for Palaeogene was published in 1971 by Martini, it used alphanumeric notation starting with NN for the Neogene and NP for the Palaeogene (first N stands for Nannoplankton), the enumeration increased from the deepest stratigraphic layer. Okada & Bukry introduced their schemes in 1980 with zones code-numbered with letters CN and CP (C stands for Coccolith). Agnini et al. in 2017 had combined the scales, reintroducing the new biohorizons for the unreliable ones, resulting in schemes coded with CNP for Palaeocene, CNE for Eocene, CNO for Oligocene, CNM for Miocene, CNPL for Pliocene/Pleistocene (CN stands for Calcareous Nannofossils).

The agreed upon stratification reference is codified as Global Boundary Stratotype Section and Point (GSSP) by the International Commission on Stratigraphy. The calcareous nannofossils, with very few exceptions, provide clear biohorizons indicating the positions of the GSSP boundaries in Cenozoic.

== Other uses ==
Calcareous nannofossils are being used in archaeology to establish the provenance of various artefacts: ceramics, tesserae, grounds of paintings, statues, and masonry.

== Sources ==
- Incarbona, A.; Ziveri, P.; Di Stefano, E.; Lirer, F.; Mortyn, G.; Patti, B.; Pelosi, N.; Sprovieri, M.; Tranchida, G.; Vallefuoco, M.; Albertazzi, S.; Bellucci, L. G.; Bonanno, A.; Bonomo, S.; Censi, P.; Ferraro, L.; Giuliani, S.; Mazzola, S.; Sprovieri, R. (17 May 2010), Calcareous nannofossil assemblages from the Central Mediterranean Sea over the last four centuries: the impact of the little ice age, Copernicus GmbH, doi:10.5194/cpd-6-817-2010, hdl:10447/60724
- Falkenberg, J.; Mutterlose, J.; Kaplan, U. (16 November 2020). "Calcareous nannofossils in medieval mortar and mortar-based materials: A powerful tool for provenance analysis". Archaeometry. 63 (1): 19–39. doi:10.1111/arcm.12626. eISSN 1475-4754. ISSN 0003-813X. S2CID 228868906.
- Romein, A.J.T. (1979). Lineages in early Paleogene calcareous nannoplankton (PDF). Utrecht Micropaleont. Bull. 22. pp. 1–231.
- Gardin, Silvia; Krystyn, Leopold; Richoz, Sylvain; Barttolini, Annachiara; Galbrun, Bruno (11 May 2012). "Where and when the earliest coccolithophores?". Lethaia. 45 (4): 507–523. doi:10.1111/j.1502-3931.2012.00311.x. ISSN 0024-1164.
- Amos Winter; William G. Siesser, eds. (23 November 2006). "Preface". Coccolithophores. Cambridge University Press. p. ix. ISBN 978-0-521-03169-1.
- Siesser, William G. (23 November 2006). "Historical background of coccolithofore studies". In Amos Winter; William G. Siesser (eds.). Coccolithophores. Cambridge University Press. pp. 1–12. ISBN 978-0-521-03169-1.
- Siesser, William G.; Haq, Bilal U. (1987). "Calcareous Nannoplankton". Notes for a Short Course: Studies in Geology. 18: 87–127. doi:10.1017/S0271164800001512. eISSN 2475-9201. ISSN 0271-1648.
- Agnini, Claudia; Monechi, Simonetta; Raffi, Isabella (23 May 2017). "Calcareous nannofossil biostratigraphy: historical background and application in Cenozoic chronostratigraphy". Lethaia. 50 (3): 447–463. doi:10.1111/let.12218. hdl:11577/3233730. ISSN 0024-1164.
- Guilford, S.H. (1908). "How can we improve our nomenclature?". The Pacific Dental Gazette. XVI (12): 818–823.
