= Chaetoceros pseudocurvisetus =

Scientific classification
- Domain: Eukaryota
- Clade: Sar
- Clade: Stramenopiles
- Division: Ochrophyta
- Clade: Bacillariophyta
- Class: Thalassiosirophyceae
- Order: Chaetocerotales
- Family: Chaetocerotaceae
- Genus: Chaetoceros
- Species: C. pseudocurvisetus

Binomial name
- Chaetoceros pseudocurvisetus Mangin

Species of single-celled organism

Chaetoceros pseudocurvisetus is a marine diatom in the genus Chaetoceros. It is an important primary producer in the oceans. C. pseudocurvisetus forms resting spores and resting cells, particularly in the absence of essential nutrients.

== Habitat ==
Chaetoceros pseudocurvisetus is a tropical or subtropical species. The most recent discoveries have been in warm waters off Japan’s coast, including upwelling regions around the Izu Islands.

== Description ==
Like most marine diatoms, C. pseudocurvisetus is characterized by its frustule, or cell wall, which is composed of silicon dioxide and other organic matter. The frustule forms as different sized valves, which overlap and are called thecae.

== Reproduction ==
Chaetoceros pseudocurvisetus can reproduce both asexually and sexually. When it divides asexually, the theae vertically separate, and this leads to a progressive reduction in cell size as one daughter cell will always be smaller than its parent cell. If the cells fail to reproduce sexually, the size reduction will cause the disappearance of one of the clones.

== Resting spores and resting cells ==
Nutrients such as nitrate are necessary for phytoplankton to thrive. Since the ocean’s availability of nutrients varies, diatoms must have ways to adapt under different nutrient levels to maintain healthy populations. When these nutrients are scarce, C. pseudocurvisetus can form alternative dormant life cycles to wait out the unfavorable conditions. These forms are resting spores and resting cells. The cells not in a dormant state are vegetative cells. Resting spores use excessive amounts of silica to create a heavily silicified cell wall. They then sink to the sediment until conditions are favorable and cause them to germinate into a diatom bloom. If excess silicic acid is not available, C. pseudocurvisetus will form resting cells. Silicic acid is limiting to diatoms. In a single population of C. pseudocurvisetus both resting spores and resting cells may be formed, depending on the concentrations of silica. Resting cells resemble vegetative cells, except they have weakly pigmented, shrunken and fragmented chloroplasts. Resting cells and resting spores both have a lower respiratory rate and photosynthetic activity than vegetative cells. Their metabolisms slow down since they are dormant. Both forms accumulate excess neutral lipids to use as stored material to maintain basic metabolic activity and to use for growth once they begin to germinate. Additionally, resting spores also accumulate glucose to store and use as energy while dormant. Both dormant forms have smaller amounts of chlorophyll a than vegetative cells, since neither are actively photosynthesizing. The reduction in chlorophyll a is also necessary because dormant cells in the euphotic zone may accumulate excess photosynthetic energy, causing lethal photochemical damages. Once high enough levels of nitrogen as well as other essential nutrients are available, the dormant forms can germinate into a bloom of vegetative cells. Other environmental factors such as light intensity and temperature must also be at the right levels for germination to occur.
