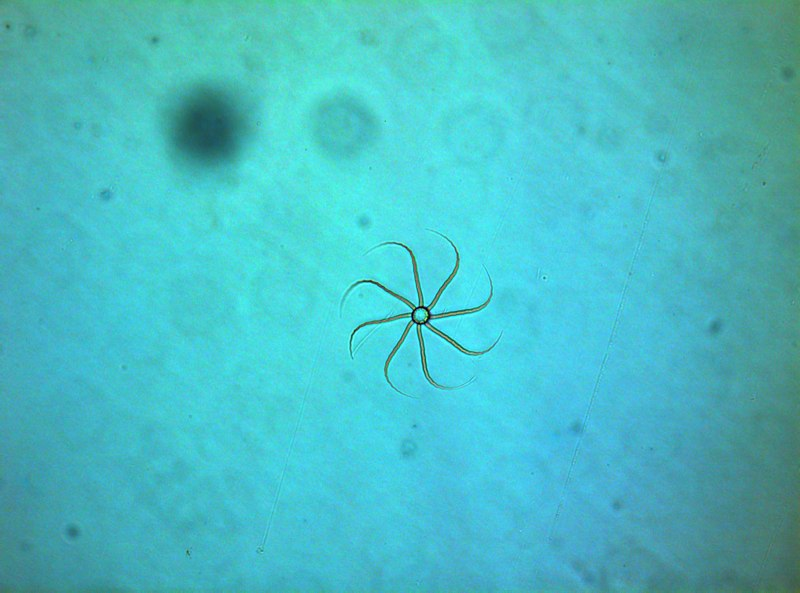

Scientific classification
- Domain: Eukaryota
- Clade: Sar
- Clade: Stramenopiles
- Division: Ochrophyta
- Clade: Bacillariophyta
- Class: Thalassiosirophyceae
- Order: Chaetocerotales
- Family: Chaetocerotaceae
- Genus: Bacteriastrum
- Species: B. delicatulum

Binomial name
- Bacteriastrum delicatulum Cleve

= Bacteriastrum delicatulum =

Species of single-celled organism

Bacteriastrum delicatulum is a diatom in the genus Bacteriastrum.
