= Chaetoceros danicus =

Scientific classification
- Domain: Eukaryota
- Clade: Diaphoretickes
- Clade: SAR
- Clade: Stramenopiles
- Phylum: Gyrista
- Subphylum: Ochrophytina
- Class: Bacillariophyceae
- Order: incertae sedis
- Family: Chaetocerotaceae
- Genus: Chaetoceros
- Species: C. danicus

Binomial name
- Chaetoceros danicus Cleve

Species of diatom

Chaetoceros danicus is a marine unicellular species of diatom in the family Chaetocerotaceae, first described by Cleve in 1889. Individual cells of C. danicus do not form long chains, unlike most other species of Chaetoceros. It forms siliceous oozes.
