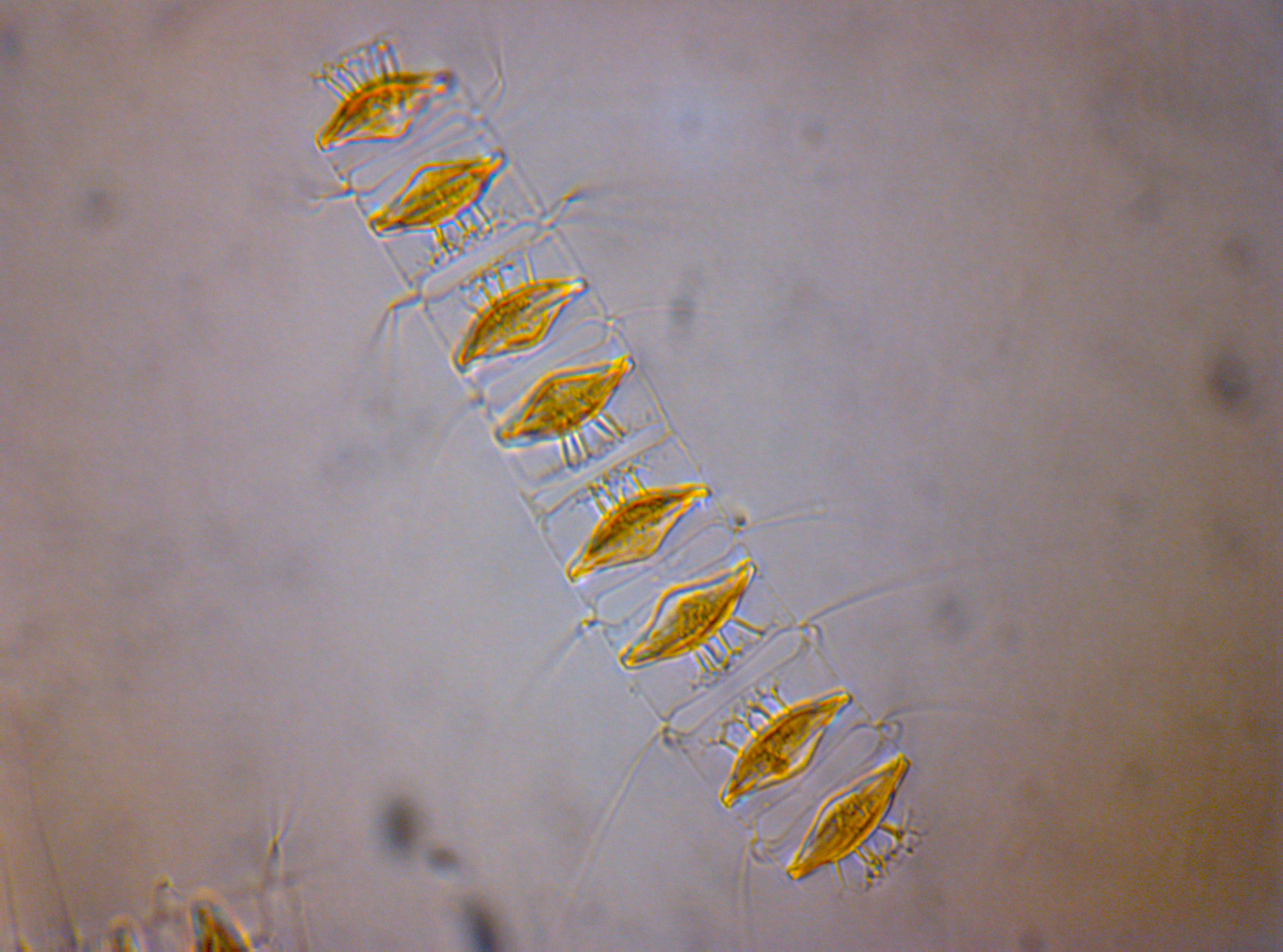

Scientific classification
- Domain: Eukaryota
- Clade: Sar
- Clade: Stramenopiles
- Phylum: Ochrophyta
- Clade: Diatomeae
- Class: Mediophyceae
- Family: Chaetocerotaceae
- Genus: Chaetoceros
- Species: C. diadema

Binomial name
- Chaetoceros diadema (Ehrenberg) Gran (1897)

= Chaetoceros diadema =

Species of diatom

Chaetoceros diadema is a diatom in the genus Chaetoceros. The easiest way to identify this species is by finding the very characteristic diadem-like resting spores.

== Species description ==
Cells united into chains. Very characteristic, diadem - like spores (see species image). One chloroplast. The base of the setae is short.

== Similar species ==
Chaetoceros constrictus is quite similar in the vegetative stage, but its resting spores are different from C. diadema resting spores .
