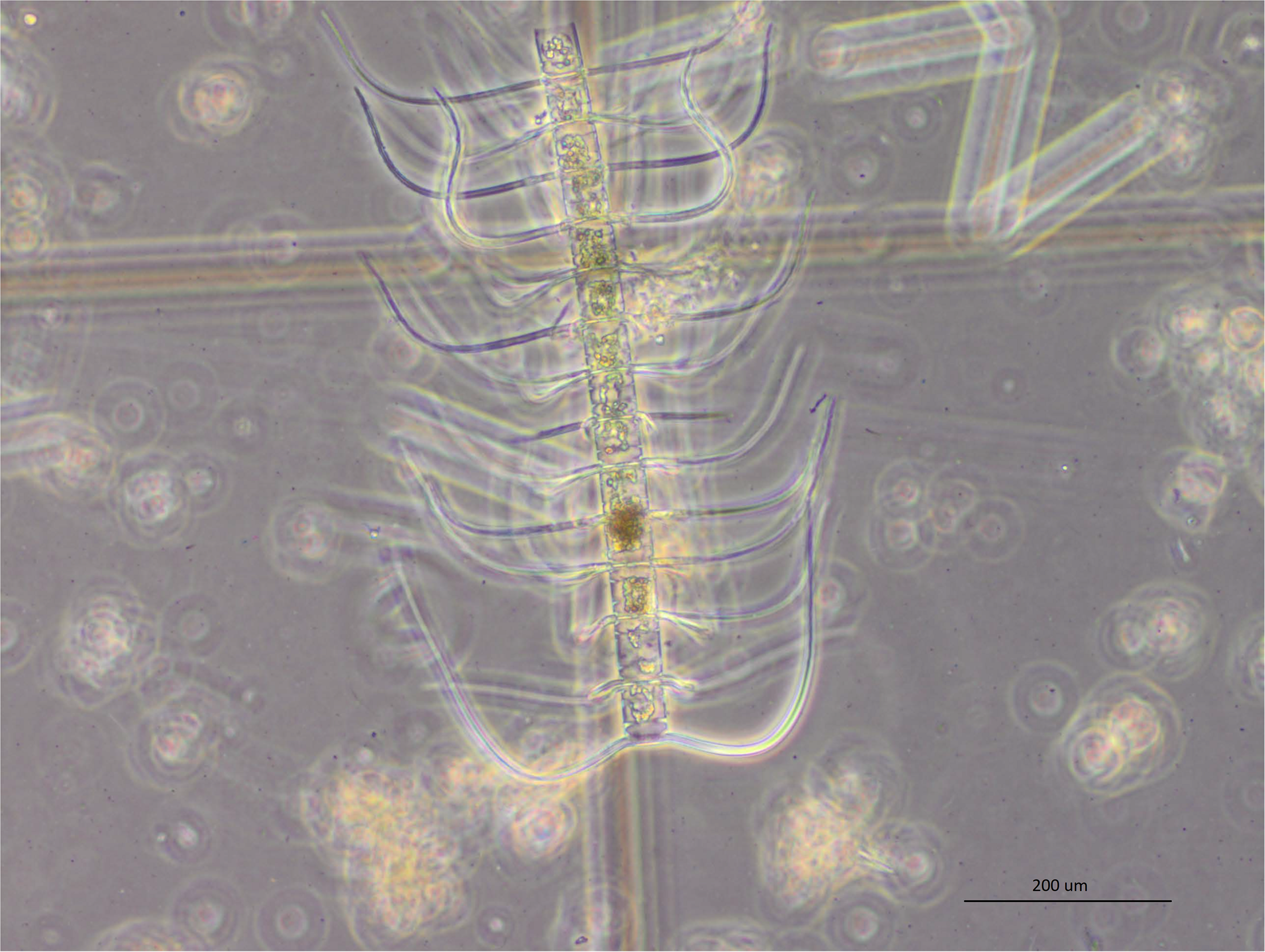

Scientific classification
- Domain: Eukaryota
- Clade: Sar
- Clade: Stramenopiles
- Division: Ochrophyta
- Clade: Bacillariophyta
- Class: Thalassiosirophyceae
- Order: Chaetocerotales
- Family: Chaetocerotaceae
- Genus: Chaetoceros
- Species: C. coarctatus

Binomial name
- Chaetoceros coarctatus Lauder, 1864

= Chaetoceros coarctatus =

Species of single-celled organism

Chaetoceros coarctatus is a marine, unicellular species of planktonic diatom in the genus Chaetoceros, first described by Lauder in January 1864 using samples from the Hong Kong harbor. Like many diatoms, it is preyed upon by ctenophores. During warming periods of the Mediterranean Sea, this non-native species, first introduced through the Suez Canal, expands its range. Cell chains showcase pairs of posterior and anterior terminal setae, as well as intercalary setae, for anti-predatory mechanical protection and floating benefits. These silica appendages have spines, curved tips, and are longer those on other members of the Chaetoceros genus for higher survival benefits.
