= Bathybius haeckelii =

Purported primordial substance

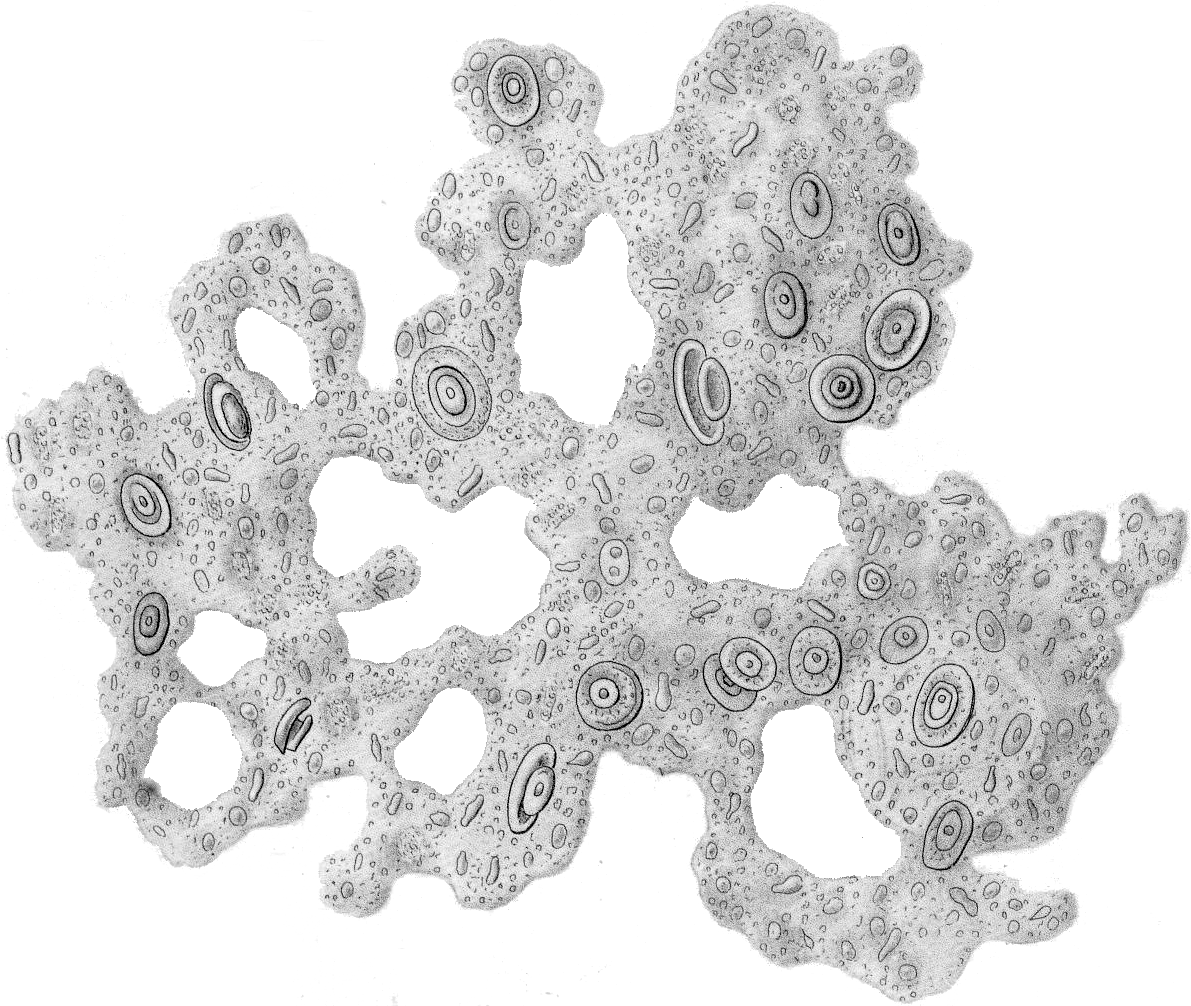

Bathybius haeckelii was a substance that British biologist Thomas Henry Huxley discovered and initially thought to be a form of primordial matter, a source of all organic life. He later admitted his mistake when it proved to be the product of an inorganic chemical process (precipitation).

In 1868, Huxley studied an old sample of mud from the Atlantic seafloor taken in 1857. When he first examined it, he had found only protozoan cells and placed the sample into a jar of alcohol to preserve it. Now he noticed that the sample contained an albuminous slime that appeared to be criss-crossed with veins.

Huxley thought he had discovered a new organic substance and named it Bathybius haeckelii, in honor of German biologist Ernst Haeckel. Haeckel had theorized about Urschleim ("primordial slime"), a protoplasm from which all life had originated. Huxley thought Bathybius could be that protoplasm, a missing link (in modern terms) between inorganic matter and organic life.

Huxley published a description of Bathybius that year and also wrote to Haeckel to tell him about it. Haeckel was impressed and flattered and procured a sample for himself. In the next edition of his textbook, The History of Creation Haeckel suggested that the substance was constantly coming into being at the bottom of the sea, "monera" arising from non-living matter due to "physicochemical causes." Huxley asserted in a speech given to the Royal Geographical Society in 1870 that Bathybius undoubtedly formed a continuous mat of living protoplasm that covered the whole ocean floor for thousands of square miles, probably a continuous sheet around the Earth.

Sir Charles Wyville Thomson examined some samples in 1869 and regarded them as analogous to mycelium; "no trace of differentiation of organs", "an amorphous sheet of a protein compound, irritable to a low degree and capable of assimilating food... a diffused formless protoplasm."

Other scientists were less enthusiastic. George Charles Wallich claimed that Bathybius was a product of chemical disintegration.

In 1872, the Challenger expedition began and spent three years studying the oceans. The expedition also took soundings at 361 ocean stations. They did not find any sign of Bathybius, despite the claim that it was a nearly universal substance. In 1875, ship's chemist John Young Buchanan analyzed a substance that looked like Bathybius from an earlier collected sample. He noticed that it was a precipitate of calcium sulfate from the seawater that had reacted with the preservative liquid (alcohol), forming a gelatinous ooze which clung to particles as if ingesting them. Buchanan suspected that all the Bathybius samples had been prepared the same way and notified Sir Charles Thomson, now the leader of the expedition. Thomson sent a polite letter to Huxley to share the discovery.

Huxley realized that he had been too eager and made a mistake. He published part of the letter in Nature and recanted his previous views. Later, during the 1879 meeting of the British Association for the Advancement of Science, he stated that he was ultimately responsible for spreading the theory and convincing others.

Most biologists accepted this acknowledgement of error. Haeckel, however, did not want to abandon the idea of Bathybius because it was so close to proof of his own theories about Urschleim. He claimed without foundation that Bathybius "had been observed" in the Atlantic. Haeckel drew a series of pictures of the evolution of his Urschleim, supposedly based on observations. He continued to support this position until 1883.

Huxley's rival George Charles Wallich claimed that Huxley had committed deliberate fraud and also accused Haeckel of falsifying data. Other opponents of evolution, including George Campbell, 8th Duke of Argyll, tried to use the case as an argument against evolution. The entire incident was a blow to the evolutionary cause, which had regarded it as their long-sought evolutionary origin of life from non-living chemistry by natural processes, without the necessity of divine intervention.
