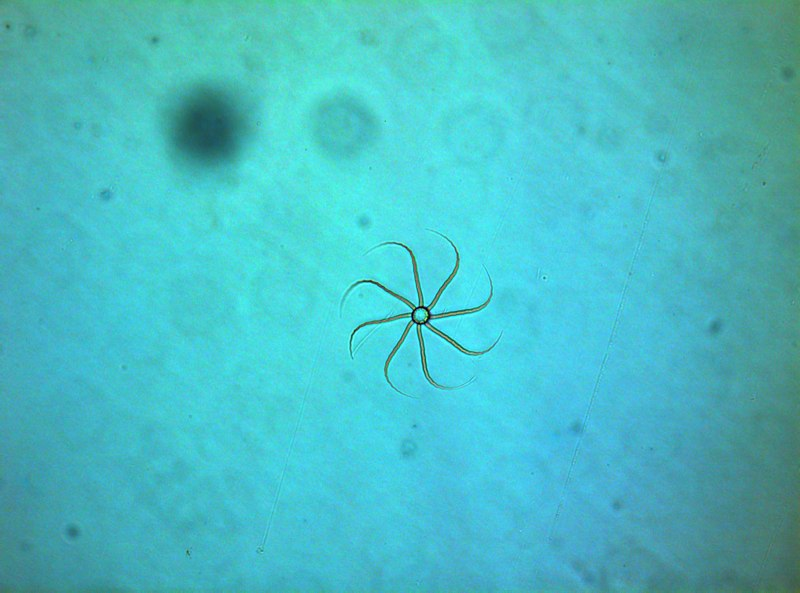
- Bacteriastrum furcatum

Scientific classification
- Domain: Eukaryota
- Clade: Sar
- Clade: Stramenopiles
- Division: Ochrophyta
- Clade: Bacillariophyta
- Class: Thalassiosirophyceae
- Order: Chaetocerotales
- Family: Chaetocerotaceae
- Genus: Bacteriastrum; Shadbolt, 1854

Species
- See text

= Bacteriastrum =

Genus of single-celled organisms

Bacteriastrum is a genus of diatoms in family Chaetocerotaceae. There are more than 30 described species in genus Bacteriastrum, but many of these are not currently accepted, and new species are still added to the genus. The type species for the genus is Bacteriastrum furcatum Shadbolt.

== Description ==
Bacteriastrum is a widely distributed marine, planktonic genus. This genus is often associated with Chaetoceros but differs in radial symmetry and fenestration of setae. The colonies tend to lie in girdle view, and the cells are separated by the curvature of the basal part of the setae, leaving a small gap between the cells. The cells are cylindrical and linked to form filaments. Each cell has several long, radiating setae which may be simple or bifurcate (branched), the setae from adjacent cells are fused. The plastids are discoid. At least one species, B. solitarium, exists as single cells.

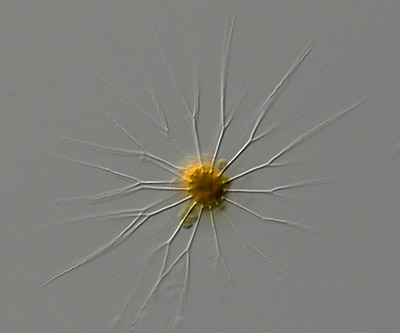
Bacteriastrum, light-micrograph of living cell with setae

== Species ==
- Bacteriastrum biconicum
- Bacteriastrum comosum Pavilliard
- Bacteriastrum delicatulum Cleve
- Bacteriastrum elegans
- Bacteriastrum elongatum Cleve
- Bacteriastrum furcatum Shadbolt
- Bacteriastrum hyalinum Lauder
- Bacteriastrum mediterraneum
- Bacteriastrum parallelum D. Sarno, A. Zingone & D. Marino
- Bacteriastrum solitarium Mangin
- Bacteriastrum varians

== See also ==
- Attheya
- Chaetoceros
