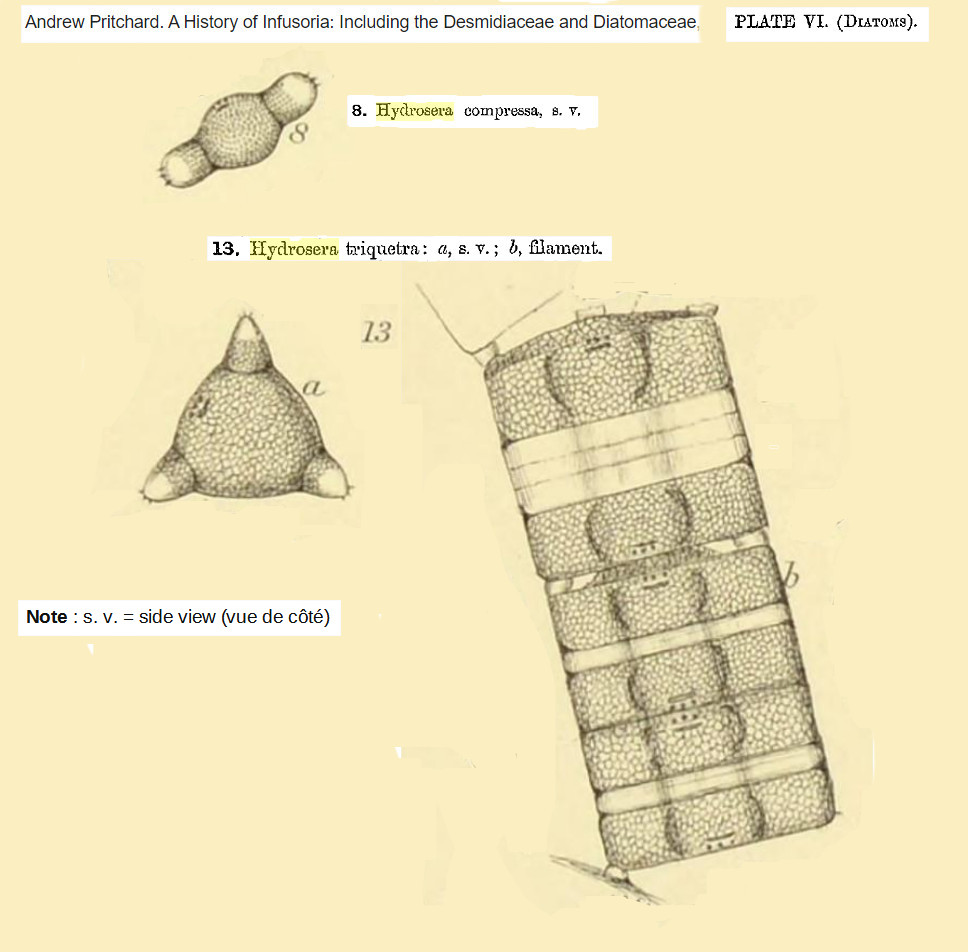

Scientific classification
- Domain: Eukaryota
- Clade: Sar
- Clade: Stramenopiles
- Division: Ochrophyta
- Clade: Bacillariophyta
- Class: Thalassiosirophyceae
- Order: Hydroseratales
- Family: Hydroserataceae
- Genus: Hydrosera; Wallich, 1858

Type species
- Hydrosera triquetra Wallich, 1858

Species
- 11, see text

= Hydrosera =

Genus of single-celled organisms

Hydrosera is a genus of diatom described in 1858 by George Charles Wallich. Hydrosera exhibits valve margins resembling two superimposed triangles and the presence of a distinct rimoportula. Hydrosera also feature porefields at the three poles of one of the apparent triangles, which contain pseudocelli. Dead Hydrosera create siliceous oozes.

Hydrosera grows in the streams of southern coastal areas and tropical islands.

== Species ==
- Hydrosera boryana Pantocsek, 1889
- Hydrosera brasiliensis Zimmerman, 1918
- Hydrosera compressa Wallich, 1858
- Hydrosera javanica (Cleve)
- Hydrosera mauritiana Bergon, 1890
- Hydrosera novaecaesarae Boyer, 1895
- Hydrosera tricornuta Stolterfoth, 1881
- Hydrosera tricoronata Stolterfoth, 1881
- Hydrosera trifoliata Cleve, 1881
- Hydrosera triquetra Wallich, 1858
- Hydrosera whampoensis (A.F. Schwarz) Deby, 1891
