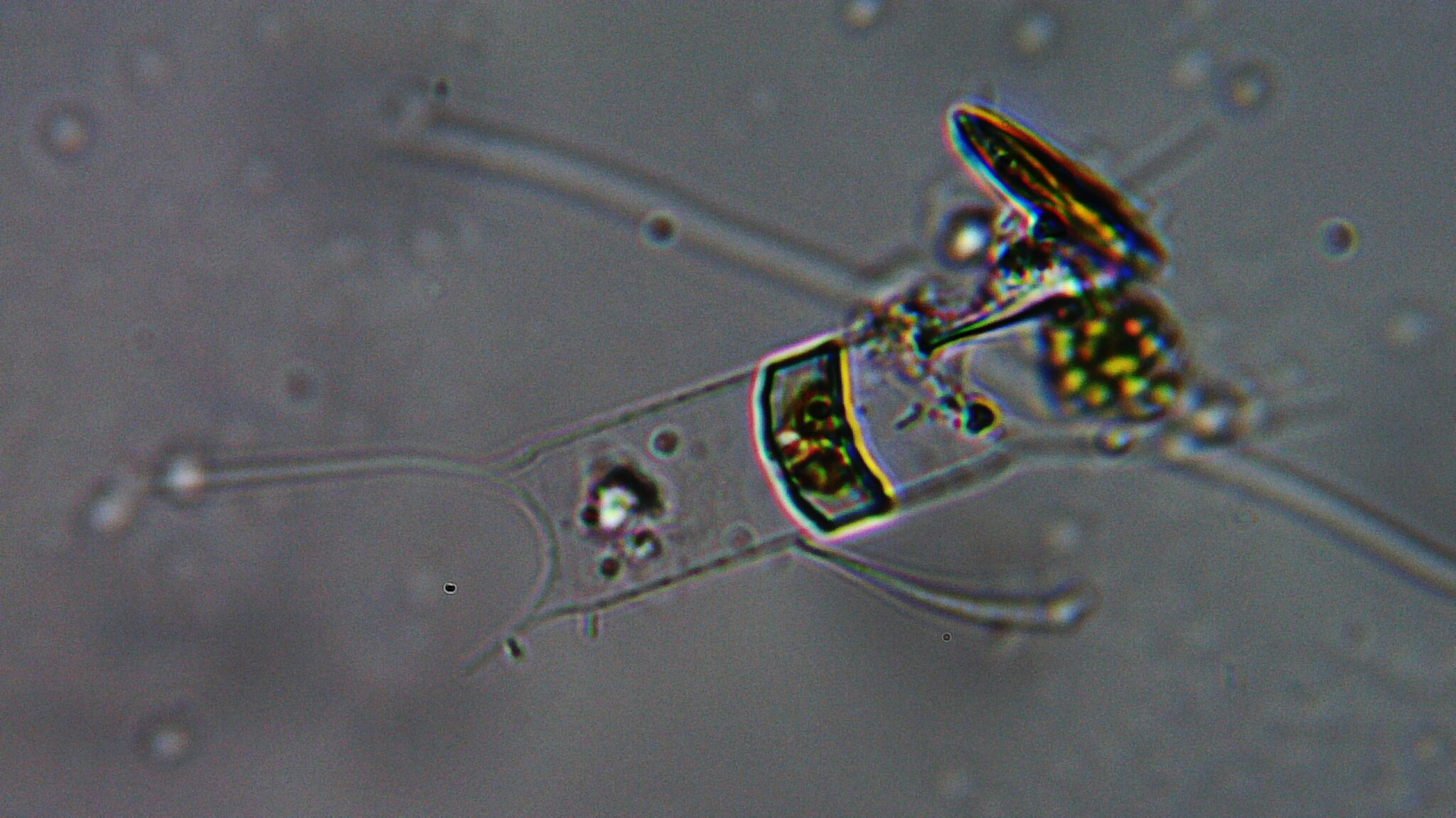
- Acanthoceras zachariasii

Scientific classification
- Domain: Eukaryota
- Clade: Diaphoretickes
- Clade: SAR
- Clade: Stramenopiles
- Phylum: Gyrista
- Subphylum: Ochrophytina
- Class: Bacillariophyceae
- Order: incertae sedis
- Family: Chaetocerotaceae
- Genus: Acanthoceras (Brun) Simonsen
- Species: A. zachariasii

Binomial name
- Acanthoceras zachariasii Honigman, 1910

= Acanthoceras zachariasii =

Genus of single-celled organisms

Acanthoceras is a genus of radially symmetric planktonic diatoms comprising a single taxonomically accepted species, Acanthoceras zachariasii. They do not have any raphe and therefore lack motility. It appears rectangular with two setae extending from each valve. Not much is known about this genus because it is easily destroyed using common preparation techniques. They can be found all over North America in small lakes and short-lasting ponds.
