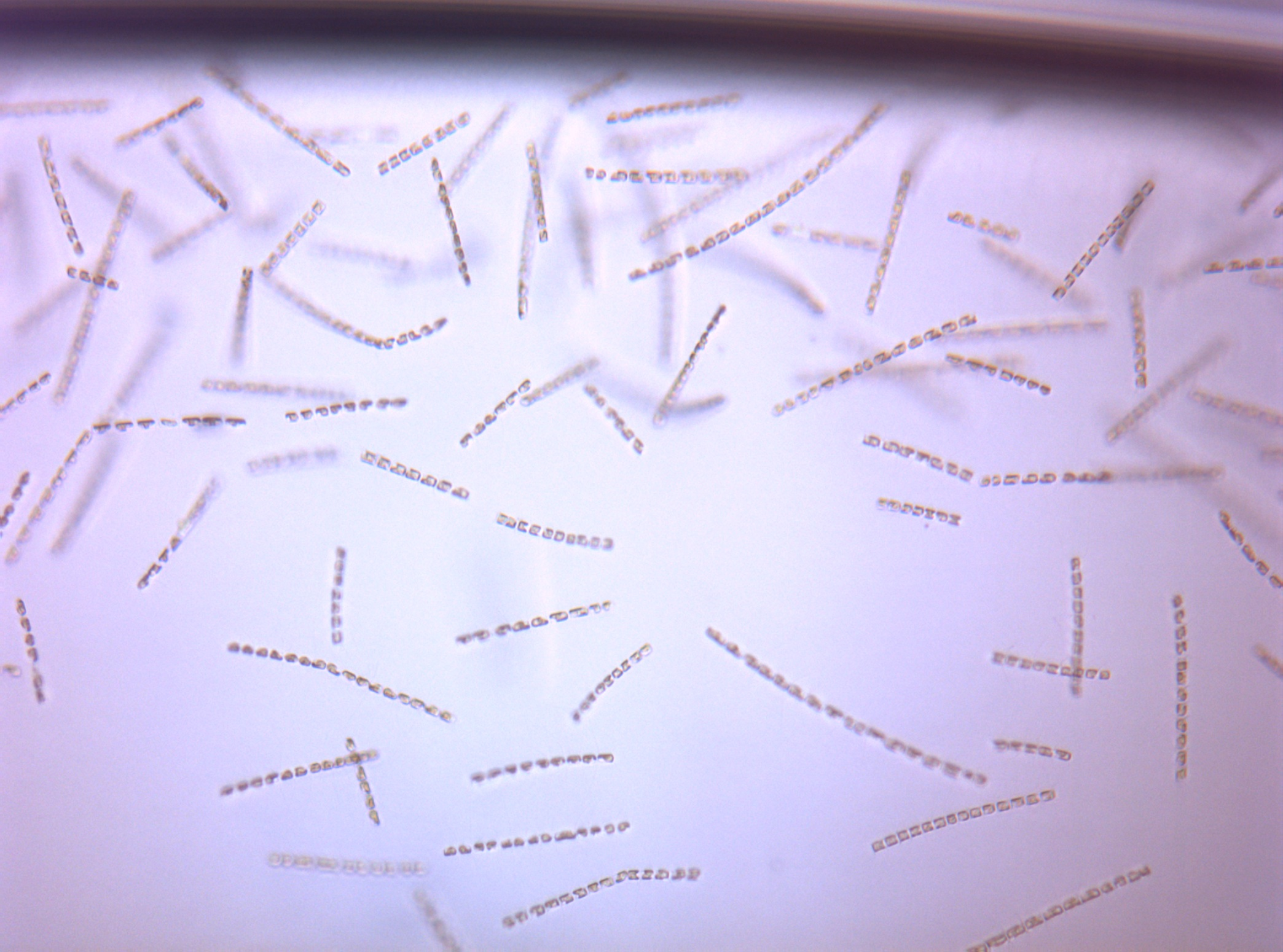
- Chaetoceros furcellatus

Scientific classification
- Domain: Eukaryota
- Clade: Sar
- Clade: Stramenopiles
- Division: Ochrophyta
- Clade: Bacillariophyta
- Class: Thalassiosirophyceae
- Order: Chaetocerotales
- Family: Chaetocerotaceae
- Genus: Chaetoceros; Ehrenberg (1844)

Type species
- Chaetoceros tetrachaeta Ehrenberg

Species
- See text

= Chaetoceros =

Chaetoceros Temporal range: 0.012–0.0 Ma

Genus of single-celled organisms

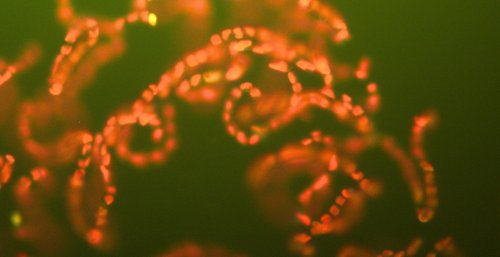
Phytoplankton – such as this colony of Chaetoceros socialis – naturally give off fluorescent light as they dissipate excess solar energy that they cannot consume through photosynthesis.

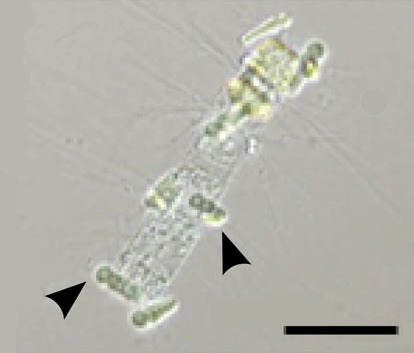
Bright-field microscopy image of epiphytic cyanobacterial symbiont Calothrix rhizosoleniae SC01 9 (indicated by arrows) attached to a host diatom Chaetoceros sp. (c). Scale bar, 50 μm.

Chaetoceros is a genus of diatoms in the family Chaetocerotaceae, first described by the German naturalist C. G. Ehrenberg in 1844. Species of this genus are mostly found in marine habitats, but a few species exist in freshwater. It is arguably the common and most diverse genus of marine planktonic diatoms, with over 200 accepted species. It is the type genus of its family.

Species in the genus Chaetoceros are found in marine waters all over the world, where they can often form algal blooms. Some strains grow quickly and produce high amounts of lipids, sparking interest in potential usage for biofuels.

== Description ==
Chaetoceros consists of cells linked together, forming straight, curved or coiled chains (termed filaments). Individual cells are elliptical in valve view, and rectangular in girdle view. One or more plate-like chloroplasts (plastids) are present within the cell.

Like other diatoms, cells of Chaetoceros are surrounded by siliceous cell walls known as frustules, which have two valves. Each valve may or may not have a central area called an annulus and a rimoportula, from which very fine areolae radiate. Each frustule has four hollow processes called setae, or spines, that allow adjacent cells to link together and form colonies. In some species, the setae are penetrated by cytoplasm and chloroplasts along their length.

Some species of Chaetoceros produce resting spores that are highly tolerant to adverse conditions.

== Environmental ranges ==
Depth range (m): 0–470
Temperature range (°C): -1.952–29.468
Nitrate (μmol L-1): 0.053 - 34.037
Salinity: 18.564 - 37.775
Oxygen (mL L-1): 4.139 - 9.192
Phosphate (μmol L-1): 0.046 - 2.358
Silicate (μmol L-1): 0.648 - 92.735

== Ecology ==
Studies suggest that colonies of Chaetoceros serve as an important food source within the water column and major carbon contributor to the benthic environment. Within the North Water, located in northern Baffin Bay, Chaetoceros has been reported to contribute about 91% of total phytoplankton cells serving as an important primary producer within this area. Therefore, contributing to oxygen production in the North Water. Overall, phytoplankton contributes to over half of Earth's oxygen production.

Chaetoceros blooms have been reported to reach concentrations of 30,100 cells/ml and can persist for multiple months. Blooms are able to persist because individuals can survive at low nutrient levels. When present in large quantities, species with larger, thicker spines can damage organisms' gills. Although, this defensive trait can help the species avoid predation and further promote bloom success. Overall, intensive development of the species of the genus Chaetoceros in the Arctic Ocean has a significant impact on the biogeochemical cycle of organic carbon and silicon, as well as on a wide range of macronutrients, trace and rare earth elements.

== Uses ==
Due to its high growth rates, research has been conducted to potentially use of Chaetoceros in biotechnology. Some Chaetoceros species are well-established commercial aquacultures. Many of them are recognized as generally good producers of useful lipids and other biologically active products with high value-added. They have enormous potential for producing nutraceuticals and biofuel.

== Diversity ==
Approximately 400 species of Chaetoceros have been described, although many of these descriptions are no longer valid. It is often very difficult to distinguish between different species. Several attempts have been made to restructure this large genus into subgenera and this work is still in progress. However, most of the effort to describe species has been focused in boreal areas, and the genus is cosmopolitan, so there are probably many tropical species still undescribed. Some species are known from the fossil record, from the Quaternary of Sweden.

=== Species ===
- Chaetoceros abnormis A.I. Proshkina-Lavrenko
- Chaetoceros aculeatus I.V. Makarova
- Chaetoceros adelianus E.E. Manguin
- Chaetoceros aduncus I.N. Sukhanova
- Chaetoceros aequatorialis var. antarcticus Manguin
- Chaetoceros aequatorialis Cleve
- Chaetoceros affinis f. pseudosymmetricus (E. Steemann Nielsen) M. Torrington-Smith
- Chaetoceros affinis f. parallelus M. Thorrington-Smith
- Chaetoceros affinis f. inaequalis M. Thorrington-Smith
- Chaetoceros affinis Lauder
- Chaetoceros amanita A. Cleve-Euler
- Chaetoceros anastomosans Grunow
- Chaetoceros angularis Schütt
- Chaetoceros angulatus F. Schütt
- Chaetoceros anostomosans var. speciosus F. Schütt
- Chaetoceros armatus T. West
- Chaetoceros astrabadicus A. Henckel
- Chaetoceros atlanticus var. compactus (F. Schütt) P.T. Cleve
- Chaetoceros atlanticus var. neapolitanus (Schroeder) Hustedt
- Chaetoceros atlanticus var. tumescens A. Grunow
- Chaetoceros atlanticus Cleve
- Chaetoceros atlanticus f. audax (F. Schütt) H.H. Gran
- Chaetoceros atlanticus var. cruciatus (G. Karsten) M. Thorrington-Smith
- Chaetoceros audax F. Schütt
- Chaetoceros bacteriastrius G.C. Wallich
- Chaetoceros bacteriastroides f. imbricatus (L.A. Mangin) M. Thorrington-Smith
- Chaetoceros bacteriastroides G.H.H. Karsten
- Chaetoceros bermejense D. U. Hernández-Becerril
- Chaetoceros bisetaceus J. Schumann
- Chaetoceros borealis J.W. Bailey
- Chaetoceros borealoides H.L. Honigmann
- Chaetoceros breve F. Schütt
- Chaetoceros brevis Schütt
- Chaetoceros brussilowi A. Henckel
- Chaetoceros buceros G.H.H. Karsten
- Chaetoceros buceros Karsten
- Chaetoceros bulbosus (Ehrenberg) Heiden
- Chaetoceros bulbosus f. cruciatus (G. Karsten) H. Heiden
- Chaetoceros bulbosus f. schimperana (G. Karsten) H. Heiden
- Chaetoceros bungei Honigmann
- Chaetoceros calcitrans (Paulsen) Takano, 1968 (or synonym of Chaetoceros simplex var. calcitrans Paulsen, 1905)
  - Chaetoceros calcitrans f. pumilus Takano
- Chaetoceros californicus A. Grunow
- Chaetoceros capense G.H.H. Karsten
- Chaetoceros caspicus C.E.H. Ostenfeld
- Chaetoceros caspicus var. karianus A. Henckel
- Chaetoceros caspicus f. pinguichaetus A. Henckel & P. Henckel
- Chaetoceros castracanei Karsten
- Chaetoceros castracanei G.H.H. Karsten
- Chaetoceros ceratospermus var. minor A.F. Meunier
- Chaetoceros ceratosporus var. brachysetus Rines & Hargraves
- Chaetoceros ceratosporus Ostenfeld
- Chaetoceros chunii G.H.H. Karsten
- Chaetoceros cinctus Gran
- Chaetoceros clavigera C.E.H. Ostenfeld
- Chaetoceros clavigerus A. Grunow
- Chaetoceros clevei F. Schütt
- Chaetoceros coarctatus Lauder
- Chaetoceros cochleus F. Schütt
- Chaetoceros compactus F. Schütt
- Chaetoceros compressus var. gracilis F. Hustedt
- Chaetoceros compressus var. hirtisetus J.E.B. Rines & P.E. Hargraves
- Chaetoceros concavicorne Mangin
- Chaetoceros confervoides J. Ralfs
- Chaetoceros confusus S.L. VanLandingham
- Chaetoceros constrictus Gran
- Chaetoceros convolutus Castracane
- Chaetoceros convolutus f. trisetosus Brunel
- Chaetoceros convolutus f. volans L.I. Smirnova
- Chaetoceros cornutus G. Leuduger-Fortmorel
- Chaetoceros coronatus Gran
- Chaetoceros costatus Pavillard
- Chaetoceros crenatus (C.G. Ehrenberg) T. Brightwell
- Chaetoceros crinitus Schütt
- Chaetoceros criophilus Castracane
- Chaetoceros cruciatus G.H.H. Karsten
- Chaetoceros curvatus Castracane
- Chaetoceros curvisetus Cleve
- Chaetoceros dadayi Pavillard
- Chaetoceros danicus Cleve
- Chaetoceros debilis Cleve
- Chaetoceros decipiens f. singularis H.H. Gran
- Chaetoceros decipiens Cleve
- Chaetoceros delicatulus C.E.H. Ostenfeld
- Chaetoceros densus Cleve
- Chaetoceros diadema (Ehrenberg) Gran
- Chaetoceros dichaeta f. unicellularis H. Heiden
- Chaetoceros dichaetus Ehrenberg
- Chaetoceros dichaetus var. polygonus (F. Schütt) H. Heiden
- Chaetoceros didymus var. praelongus E.J. Lemmermann
- Chaetoceros didymus f. aestivus H.H. Gran
- Chaetoceros didymus f. autumnalis H.H. Gran
- Chaetoceros didymus C.G. Ehrenberg
- Chaetoceros difficilis Cleve
- Chaetoceros distichus F. Schütt
- Chaetoceros distinguendus E.J. Lemmermann
- Chaetoceros diversicurvatus Van Goor
- Chaetoceros diversus var. mediterraneus J.L.B. Schröder
- Chaetoceros diversus Cleve
- Chaetoceros eibenii (Grunow) Meunier
- Chaetoceros elmorei Boyer
- Chaetoceros elongatus Honigmann
- Chaetoceros exospermus Meunier
- Chaetoceros externus Gran
- Chaetoceros fallax Prosckina-Lavrenko
- Chaetoceros femur F. Schütt
- Chaetoceros filiferus G.H.H. Karsten
- Chaetoceros filiforme Meunier
- Chaetoceros flexuosus Mangin
- Chaetoceros fragilis Meunier
- Chaetoceros furca var. macroceras J.L.B. Schröder
- Chaetoceros furcellatus J.W. Bailey
- Chaetoceros fusus F. Schütt
- Chaetoceros galvestonense Collier & Murphy
- Chaetoceros gastridius (C.G. Ehrenberg) T. Brightwell
- Chaetoceros gaussii Heiden & Kolbe
- Chaetoceros gracialis A. Henckel
- Chaetoceros glandazii Mangin
- Chaetoceros gobii A. Henckel
- Chaetoceros gracilis Pantocsek
- Chaetoceros grunowii F. Schütt
- Chaetoceros hendeyi Manguin
- Chaetoceros hispidus var. monicae A. Grunow
- Chaetoceros hohnii Graebn. & Wujek
- Chaetoceros holsaticus Schütt
- Chaetoceros ikari B.V. Skvortzov
- Chaetoceros imbricatus Mangin
- Chaetoceros incurvus var. umbonatus Castracane
- Chaetoceros incurvus Bailey
- Chaetoceros indicus Karsten
- Chaetoceros ingolfianus Ostenfeld
- Chaetoceros intermedius A. Henckel
- Chaetoceros karianus Grunow
- Chaetoceros karyanus A. Henckel
- Chaetoceros knipowitschii A. Henckel
- Chaetoceros laciniosus Schüt
- Chaetoceros laciniosus f. protuberans M. Thorrington-Smith
- Chaetoceros laciniosus f. pelagicus H.H. Gran
- Chaetoceros lauderi Ralfs
- Chaetoceros leve F. Schütt
- Chaetoceros littorale litorale E.J. Lemmermann
- Chaetoceros lorenzianus var. forceps A.F. Meunier
- Chaetoceros lorenzianus Grunow
- Chaetoceros malygini A. Henckel
- Chaetoceros medius F. Schütt C
- Chaetoceros meridiana (F. Schütt) G. Karsten
- Chaetoceros mertensii H.L. Honigmann
- Chaetoceros messanense Castracane C
- Chaetoceros minimus (Levander) D. Marino, G. Giuffre, M. Montresor & A. Zingone
- Chaetoceros misumensis H.H. Gran & K. Yendo
- Chaetoceros mitra (J.W. Bailey) Cleve
- Chaetoceros muelleri var. duplex E.J. Lemmermann
- Chaetoceros muelleri var. subsalsum J.R. Johansen & S. Rushforth
- Chaetoceros muelleri E.J. Lemmermann
- Chaetoceros muellerii var. subsalsus J.R. Johansen & Rushforth
- Chaetoceros nansenii A. Henckel
- Chaetoceros natatus E.E. Manguin
- Chaetoceros neglectus Karsten
- Chaetoceros neobulbosus T.V. Desikachary, S. Gowthaman & Y. Latha
- Chaetoceros neocompactus S.L. VanLandingham
- Chaetoceros neogracile S.L. VanLandingham
- Chaetoceros neupokojewii A. Henckel
- Chaetoceros nipponicus J. Ikari
- Chaetoceros odontella (C.G. Ehrenberg) G.L. Rabenhorst
- Chaetoceros okamurae var. tetrasetus J. Ikari
- Chaetoceros okamurae J. Ikari
- Chaetoceros ostenfeldii P.T. Cleve
- Chaetoceros pachtussowii A. Henckel
- Chaetoceros pachyceros R. Margalef
- Chaetoceros pacificus J. Ikari
- Chaetoceros paradoxus Cleve
- Chaetoceros paradoxus var. luedersii Engler
- Chaetoceros parvus F. Schütt
- Chaetoceros paulsenii f. robustus A. Henckel
- Chaetoceros pavillardii J. Ikari
- Chaetoceros pelagicus
- Chaetoceros pendulus Karsten
- Chaetoceros perpusillus Cleve
- Chaetoceros peruvianus var. victoriae Karsten
- Chaetoceros peruvianus var. gracilis J.L.B. Schröder
- Chaetoceros peruvianus Brightwell
- Chaetoceros peruvianus var. robustum P.T. Cleve
- Chaetoceros peruvianus var. suadivae Karsten
- Chaetoceros peruvianus f. volans (F. Schütt) C.E.H. Ostenfeld
- Chaetoceros peruvianus f. robustus (P.T. Cleve) C.E.H. Ostenfeld
- Chaetoceros phuketensis J.E.B. Rines, P. Boonruang & E.C. Theriot
- Chaetoceros pingue A. Henckel
- Chaetoceros pinguichaetus A. Henckel & P. Henckel
- Chaetoceros pliocenus J.-J. Brun
- Chaetoceros protuberans H.S. Lauder
- Chaetoceros pseudoaurivillii J. Ikari
- Chaetoceros pseudocrinitus Ostenfeld
- Chaetoceros pseudocurvisetus Mangin
- Chaetoceros pseudodichaeta J. Ikari
- Chaetoceros pundulus G.H.H. Karsten
- Chaetoceros radians F. Schütt
- Chaetoceros radicans F. Schütt
- Chaetoceros recurvatus f. robustus Henckel
- Chaetoceros recurvatus Henckel
- Chaetoceros robustus (P.T. Cleve) C.E.H. Ostenfeld
- Chaetoceros rostratus Lauder
- Chaetoceros russanowi A. Henckel
- Chaetoceros salsugineus Takano
- Chaetoceros saltans P.T. Cleve
- Chaetoceros schmidtii C.E.H. Ostenfeld
- Chaetoceros schuettii f. oceanicus H.H. Gran
- Chaetoceros secundus P.T. Cleve
- Chaetoceros seiracanthus Gran
- Chaetoceros sessile Grøntved
- Chaetoceros setoense J. Ikari
- Chaetoceros seychellarus G.H.H. Karsten
- Chaetoceros seychellarus var. austral E.E. Manguin
- Chaetoceros siamense C.E.H. Ostenfeld
- Chaetoceros similis Cleve
- Chaetoceros simplex C.E.H. Ostenfeld C
- Chaetoceros skeleton F. Schütt
- Chaetoceros socialis f. radians (F. Schütt) A.I. Proshkina-Lavrenko
- Chaetoceros socialis Lauder
- Chaetoceros socialis var. autumnalis Prosckina-Lavrenko
- Chaetoceros sedowii A. Henckel
- Chaetoceros strictus G.H.H. Karsten
- Chaetoceros subcompressus J.L.B. Schröder
- Chaetoceros subsalsus Lemmermann
- Chaetoceros subsecundus (Grunow ex Van Heurck) Hustedt
- Chaetoceros subtilis Cleve
- Chaetoceros sumatranus Karsten
- Chaetoceros tenuissimus A.F. Meunier
- Chaetoceros teres f. spinulosus H.H. Gran
- Chaetoceros teres Cleve
- Chaetoceros tetrachaeta Ehrenberg
- Chaetoceros tetras G.H.H. Karsten
- Chaetoceros tetrastichon Cleve
- Chaetoceros thienemannii Hustedt
- Chaetoceros throndsenii var. trisetosus Zingone
- Chaetoceros throndsenii var. throndsenia D. Marino, M. Montresor & A. Zingone
- Chaetoceros throndsenii (Marino, Montresor, & Zingone) Marino, Montresor & Zingone
- Chaetoceros tortissimus H.H. Gran
- Chaetoceros transisetus J.R. Johansen & J.S. Boyer
- Chaetoceros vanheurckii H.H. Gran
- Chaetoceros vermiculus F. Schütt
- Chaetoceros villosus Kützing
- Chaetoceros vistulae C. Apstein
- Chaetoceros volans F. Schütt
- Chaetoceros weissflogii F. Schütt
- Chaetoceros wighamii Brightwell
- Chaetoceros willei Grunow
- Chaetoceros zachariasi var. longus H.L. Honigmann
- Chaetoceros zachariasii var. variatus H.L. Honigmann
- Chaetoceros zachariasii var. latus H.L. Honigmann
- Chaetoceros zachariasii Honigmann
- Chaetoceros ziwolkii A. Henckel

== See also ==
Viruses associated with Chaetoceros species

- Chaetoceros tenuissimus RNA virus 01
- Chaetoceros salsugineum DNA virus 01
- Chaetoceros socialis f. radians RNA virus 01
