= Friedrich Hustedt =

German teacher and botanist

Friedrich Hustedt (1886 – 1 April 1968) was a German teacher and botanist, best known for his diatom systematics research.

He was born and grew up in Bremen, Germany. He taught school for 32 years, in 1924 becoming the head teacher of the school at Hauffstraße in Bremen. Hustedt initially pursued his interest in diatoms as a hobby, but his standing in the scientific community grew rapidly; thus, in 1939 he left school to study diatoms full-time. He described over 2000 diatom taxa and eventually amassed the largest private diatom collection in the world which is currently housed at the Alfred Wegener Institute for Polar and Marine Research in Bremerhaven, Germany.

The phycological genera Hustedtia and Hustedtiella commemorate his name.
