= George Charles Wallich =

British biologist

George Charles Wallich (16 November 1815 – 31 March 1899) was a British medical doctor, marine biologist and professional photographer. He was born in Calcutta where his father, the Danish naturalist Nathaniel Wallich, was Superintendent of the Royal Botanical Gardens. As a Surgeon-Major in the Indian Medical Service, he served 'during the Sutlej and Punjab campaigns, and also during the Santhal rebellion of 1855–56. He retired from the service in 1858.' In 1860 he accompanied Sir Leopold M'Clintock aboard the Bulldog on a voyage across the North Atlantic to survey the sea-bottom for the laying of the proposed trans-Atlantic cable. He won the Linnean Medal in 1898 'in recognition of the valuable work accomplished by him in connection with the exploration of the fauna of the deep sea' (St James's Gazette, 16 April 1898).

== See also ==
- European and American voyages of scientific exploration
