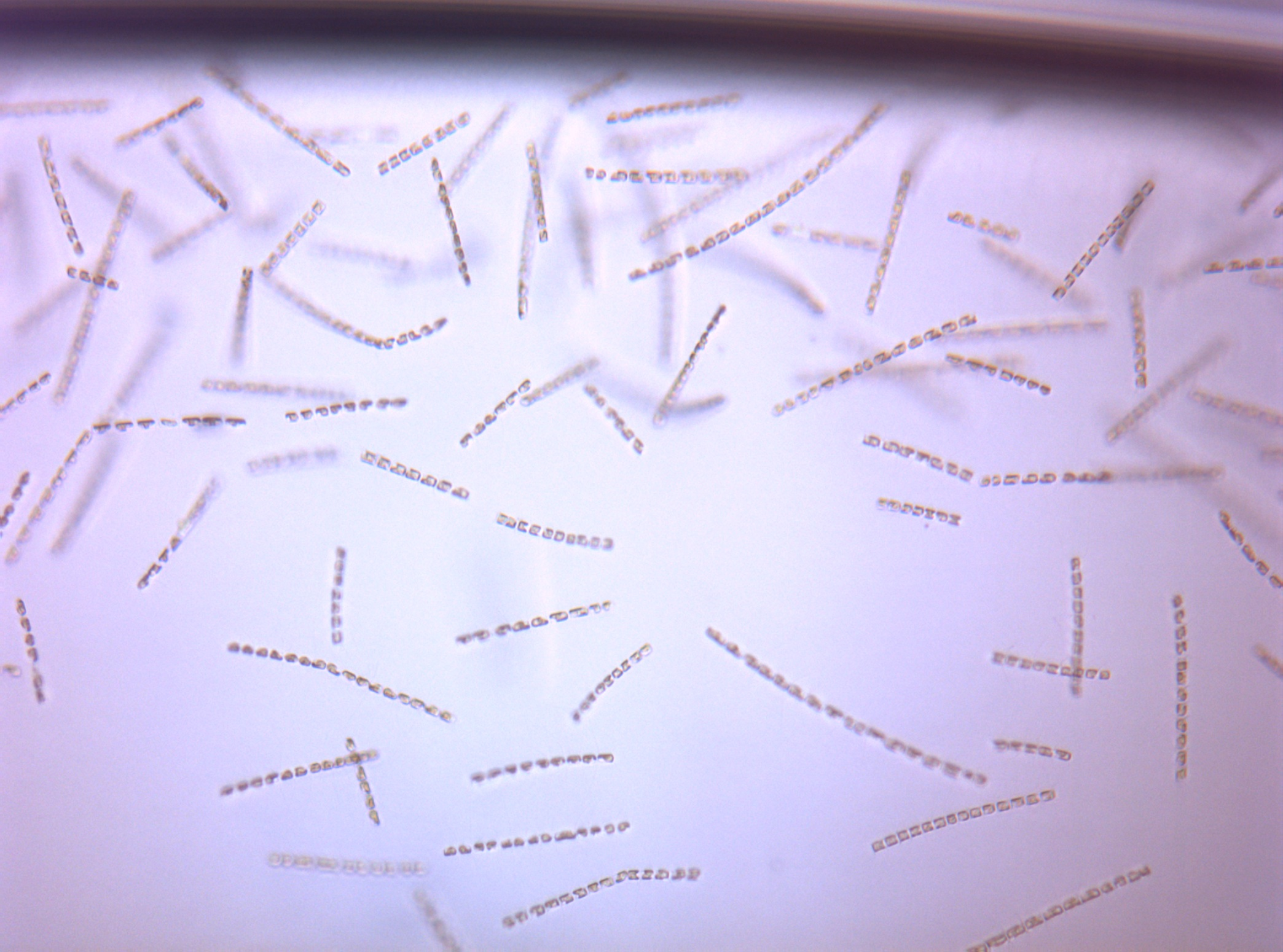
- Chaetoceros furcellatus

Scientific classification
- Domain: Eukaryota
- Clade: Sar
- Clade: Stramenopiles
- Division: Ochrophyta
- Clade: Bacillariophyta
- Class: Thalassiosirophyceae
- Subclass: Chaetocerotophycidae
- Order: Chaetocerotales
- Family: Chaetocerotaceae; Ralfs in Pritchard 1861

Genera
- Acanthoceras Honigm., 1910; Bacteriastrum Shadbolt; Chaetoceros Ehrenberg; Gonioceros H. Peragallo in H. Peragallo & M. Peragallo, 1907; Miraltia D. Marino, M. Montresor & A. Zingone, 1987; Peripteropsis I. Suto, 2005; Vallodiscus I. Suto, 2005

= Chaetocerotaceae =

Family of diatoms

Chaetocerotaceae is a diatom family. Chaetoceros is perhaps the largest and most species rich genus of marine planktonic diatoms. The taxonomic status within Chaetocerotaceae at present is somewhat unclear.

== Description ==
The cells have valves with long setae. Cells are often in unseparable chains, but may appear as solitary cells in some species. Chains are formed by fusion of silica between the setae. Endogenous resting spores are common and very different from normal vegetative cells.
