= Resting spore =

A resting spore is a resistant cell, adapted to survive adverse environmental conditions. Resting spore is a term commonly applied to both diatoms and fungi.

== In fungi and oomycetes ==
A resting spore can be a spore created by fungi which is thickly encysted (has a thick cell wall) in order to survive through stressful times, such as drought. It protects the spore from biotic (microbial, fungal viral), as well as abiotic (wind, heat, xeric conditions) factors. Resting spores of a particular oomycete species are important in causing late potato blight. They can lie dormant within the soil of a field for decades until the right conditions occur for viability (plant host present, rain, fire etc.).

== In diatoms ==
A similar resting spore life stage is also present in diatoms, and in such case, is also often referred to as the hypnospore. Importantly, the resting spore of marine diatoms is not an obligate stage of the life cycle, except in the minority of studied taxa, where spore production immediately follows the first cellular product of sexual reproduction, the auxospore. Generally, resting spore formation in diatoms is primarily considered a survival tactic for adverse conditions by producing dense spores with thick silica frustules that can sink cells out of the surface, typically high in light and temperature, into the cooler, darker and nutrient rich depths. Spores have been observed to last decades in such conditions that reduce metabolic demand, awaiting mixing events that may carry them back into favorable environmental conditions where they may germinate.

=== Formation, morphology and germination ===
The formation of resting spores is considered to be the consequence of environmental stress. Spore formation has been described immediately proceeding bloom formation although there are a variety of potential causes for spore formation in blooms. Studies of resting spore formation in diatoms have found that nitrogen limitation, temperature, and light limitation are all capable drivers of spore formation.

The differences in resting spore formation reflects the immense diversity in the phylogeny of diatoms. Notably, resting spores are not a feature of all diatoms. Although they can be found in freshwater varieties, and pennate diatoms, they are considered most prevalent in marine centric diatoms. Within marine centric diatoms, resting spore formation has been most commonly observed from a vegetative parent cell, but some species have been noted to require an auxospore parent cell, which is the product of sexual reproduction.

The formation of resting spores is product of two acytokinetic divisions of the parent cell, wherein the cytoplasm of the daughter cells is shared. The resting spores produced may be either exogeneous (mature spore has no contact with parent cell), endogenous (completely enclosed within the parent cell), or semi-endogenous (only the hypovalve of the resting spore enclosed within the parent thecae). The common characteristic of diatom resting spores is a thick silica frustule. Generally, the frustule will be morphologically similar to the vegetative cell, but it can differ greatly. The frustule itself may be with or without a cell girdle, which dictate alternate germination processes, whereby the thecae of resting spores with girdles become the hypotheca and both valves are shed when the girdle is absent.

=== Ecological significance ===
Resting spore formation plays an important role in the survival of diatoms through periods of adverse environmental conditions. The formation of a spore with a thick frustule increases the density of the diatom, allowing a drop in the water column to the sediment or pycnocline where reduced light, and potentially cooler temperatures may increase the lifespan of the spore by reducing the metabolic imbalance between demand and resource availability. Dropping deeper into the water column may also put the resting spore in a place where nutrient availability is greater. The thick silica frustule can also serve during period as a resting spore to enhance the resistance to zooplanktonic grazers, which are known to be a frequently dominant source of mortality for many marine phytoplankton.

Ultimately, the resting spore relies that it will be mixed back up to the surface at a time when conditions for growth are favorable and it can germinate. This suggests that generally, a shallow neritic habitat is needed to be able to mix back into the photic zone. If the spore is an obligate part of the life cycle, shallow depth requirement can limit range unless the pycnocline is sufficient to suspend the spore. Resting spores are believed to last potentially decades with germination remaining viable. Resting spores may allow diatoms to survive environmental variability from weekly and seasonal scale to decadal patterns like the NAO. This can allow diatoms to survive in areas where they cannot grow year-round or perhaps even every year. It has even been proposed that the resting spore stage of diatoms has aided survival through mass extinction events including the cretaceous extinction, which brought an estimated three quarters of all plant and animal life to extinction. This extinction was also characterized by its limitation to solar radiation, necessary for diatoms which are photosynthetic. However, as laboratory experiments have shown, light limitation could trigger resting spore formation, which might have allowed many spore forming diatoms to survive a mass extinction event such as the cretaceous.

In conjunction with survival through adverse environmental conditions, the resting spore is considered important for seeding with cells that can await opportune conditions and start a population. This is believed to be important in regions like the North Atlantic where deep winter mixing is then stabilized and a shallower, nutrient rich mixed layer develops. In such regions, seeding by resting spores could provide competitive advantage through founder's effect. Simply, if a diatom has a competitive growth rate, and is among the first to pioneer a newly available resource, it may have a competitive advantage. For the purposes of seeding, a spore sinking to the benthos has also been hypothesized to reduce the likelihood of advective transport outside the habitable range, meaning by sinking to the sediment of an area that previously had favorably growth conditions, fewer cells will be transported outside the habitable range they will ever be able to grow in.

While these are important advantages to spore formation, the mortality rate is presumably high, particularly in oceanic zones, where pycnoclines may suspend spores, but presumably many resting spores are lost beyond the reach of the mixing zone. While from the standpoint of diatoms this is disadvantageous, it has been evidenced that rapid sinking and sedimentation of resting spores, particularly in large events after blooms, may represent an important export of nutrients to the deep ocean. Resting spores may be particularly important, because of their rapid sinking rate, which might reduce the opportunity for being recycled back into the food web of the photic zone.

== See also ==
- Chlamydospore
- Endospore
