= Hexacontium pachydermum =

Scientific classification
- Domain: Eukaryota
- Clade: Sar
- Clade: Rhizaria
- Phylum: Retaria
- Class: Polycystina
- Order: Spumellaria
- Family: Actinommidae
- Genus: Hexacontium
- Species: H. pachydermum

Binomial name
- Hexacontium pachydermum (Jφrgensen, 1899)

Species of single-celled organism

Hexacontium pachydermum is a species in the genus Hexacontium of the family Actinommidae. It was described by Eugen Honoratius Jørgensen in 1899.
