= Cladococcus viminalis =

Scientific classification
- Domain: Eukaryota
- Clade: Sar
- Clade: Rhizaria
- Phylum: Radiolaria
- Class: Polycystina
- Order: Spumellaria
- Family: Actinommidae
- Genus: Cladococcus
- Species: C. viminalis

Binomial name
- Cladococcus viminalis Haeckel, 1860

Species of single-celled organism

Cladococcus viminalis is a species of radiolarian.

== Anatomy ==
This radiolarian, like all other radiolarians, can produce extremely complex silica tests of pores and spines that are laid down in an obvious geometric shape. The spines give this species buoyancy, while the pores provide a way for cell material called pseudopodia to escape this species's body. The pseudopodia engulf any food that gets trapped on the spines and carry it to the middle of the cell to be digested. This species is also a polycystine radiolarian.

== Habitat ==
This species can be found in the Mediterranean Sea, near the surface of the ocean, in the fjords of Norway, and in the central Pacific Ocean. It is one of the most commonly fossilized radiolarian, frequently discovered in limestone and chalk rocks.
