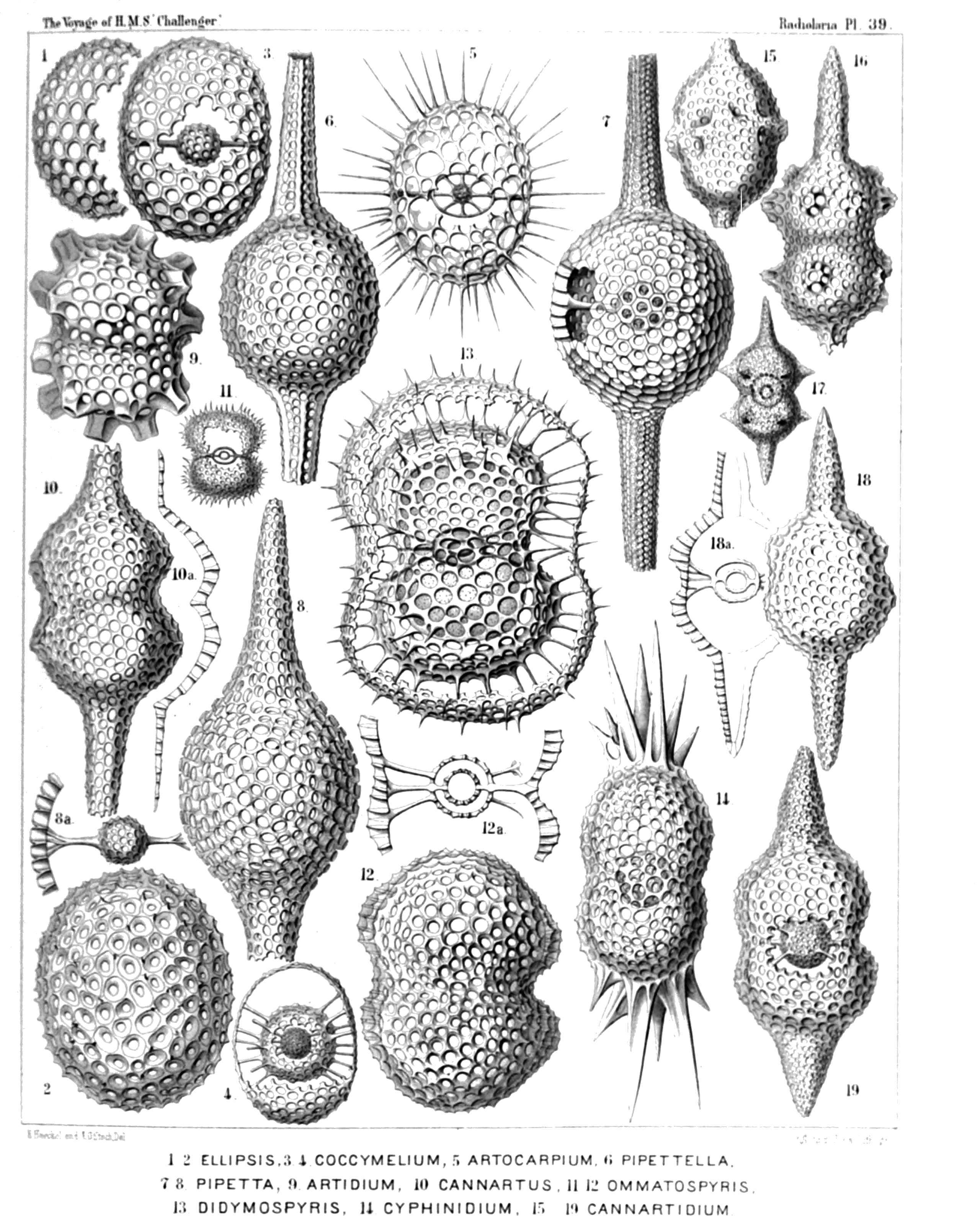
- Illustration from Report on the Radiolaria collected by H.M.S. Challenger during the years 1873-1876. Part III. Plate 39. Ellipsida, Druppulida, Artiscida et Cyphinida. Fig. 1. Cenellipsis faceta, n. sp. (vel Ellipsis faceta), ×300; Fig. 2. Cenellipsis infundibulum, n. sp. (vel Ellipsis infundibulum), ×300

Scientific classification
- Domain: Eukaryota
- Clade: Sar
- Clade: Rhizaria
- Phylum: Retaria
- Class: Polycystina
- Order: Spumellaria
- Genus: Cenellipsis; Haeckel, 1887a

Species
- Several, including: Cenellipsis elegans Borissenko, 1958; Cenellipsis faceta (type); Cenellipsis heterophoris Campbell & Clark, 1944; Cenellipsis infundibulum

Synonyms
- Ellipsis Haeckel, 1887

= Cenellipsis =

Genus of single-celled organisms

Cenellipsis is a genus of radiolarians in the order Spumellaria. The genus is extant but there are also fossil species.

Cenellipsis Rüst, 1885b, p. 286 is a Nomen Nudum (no description).
