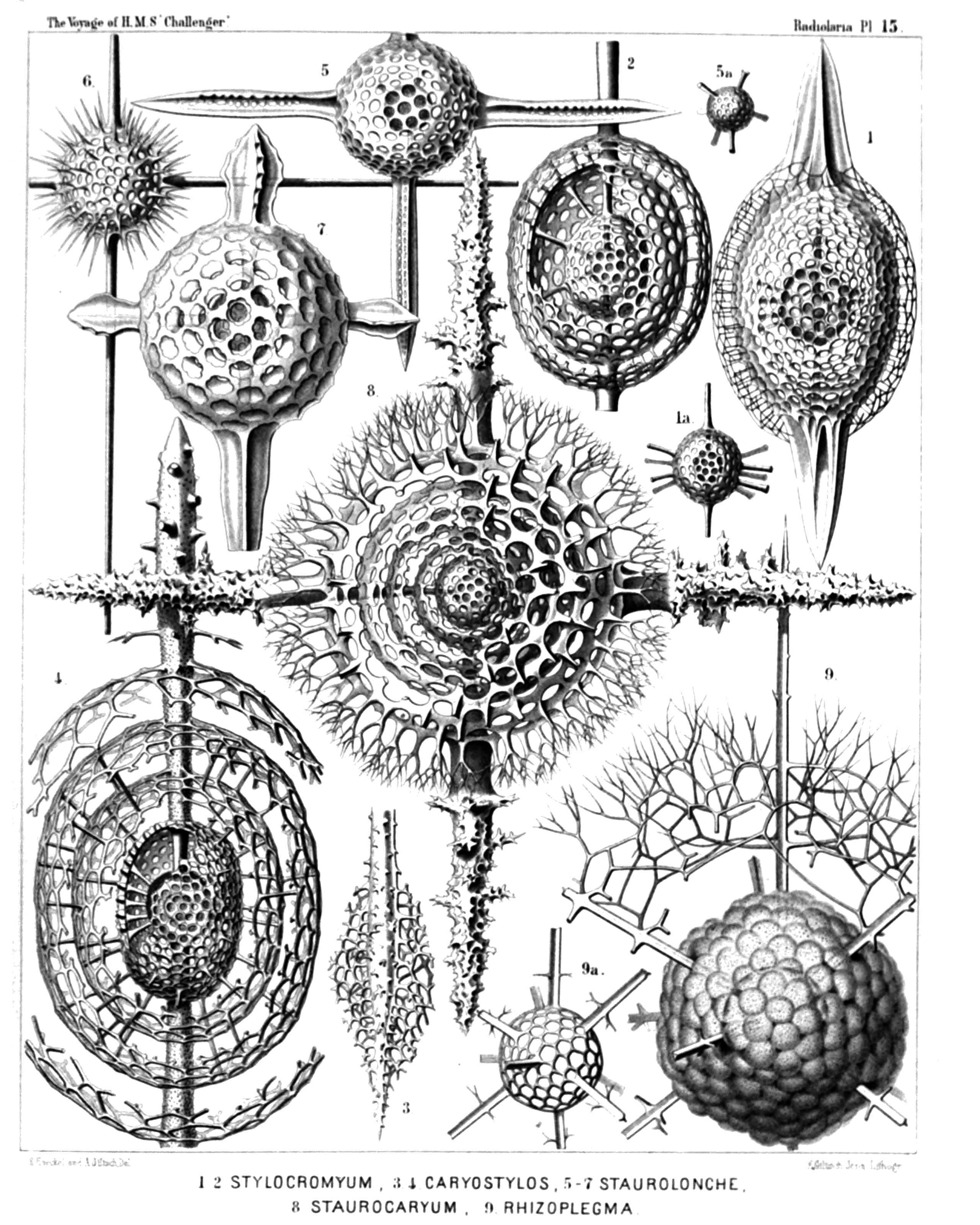
- Illustration from Report on the Radiolaria collected by H.M.S. Challenger during the years 1873-1876. Part III. Plate 15. Staurosphærida et Druppulida. Fig. 1. Cromyatractus tetracelyphus, n. sp., ×300; Fig. 2. Cromyatractus tetraphractus, n. sp., ×300; Fig. 3. Cromyatractus cepicius, n. sp., ×300; Fig. 4. Cromyatractus ceparius, n. sp. (vel Caryostylus ceparius), ×300

Scientific classification
- Domain: Eukaryota
- Clade: Sar
- Clade: Rhizaria
- Phylum: Retaria
- Class: Polycystina
- Order: Spumellaria
- Genus: Cromyatractus; Haeckel, 1887

Species
- Cromyatractus ceparius; Cromyatractus cepicius; Cromyatractus elegans; Cromyatractus tetracelyphus; Cromyatractus tetraphractus (type)

= Cromyatractus =

Genus of single-celled organisms

Cromyatractus is a genus of radiolarians in the order Spumellaria.
