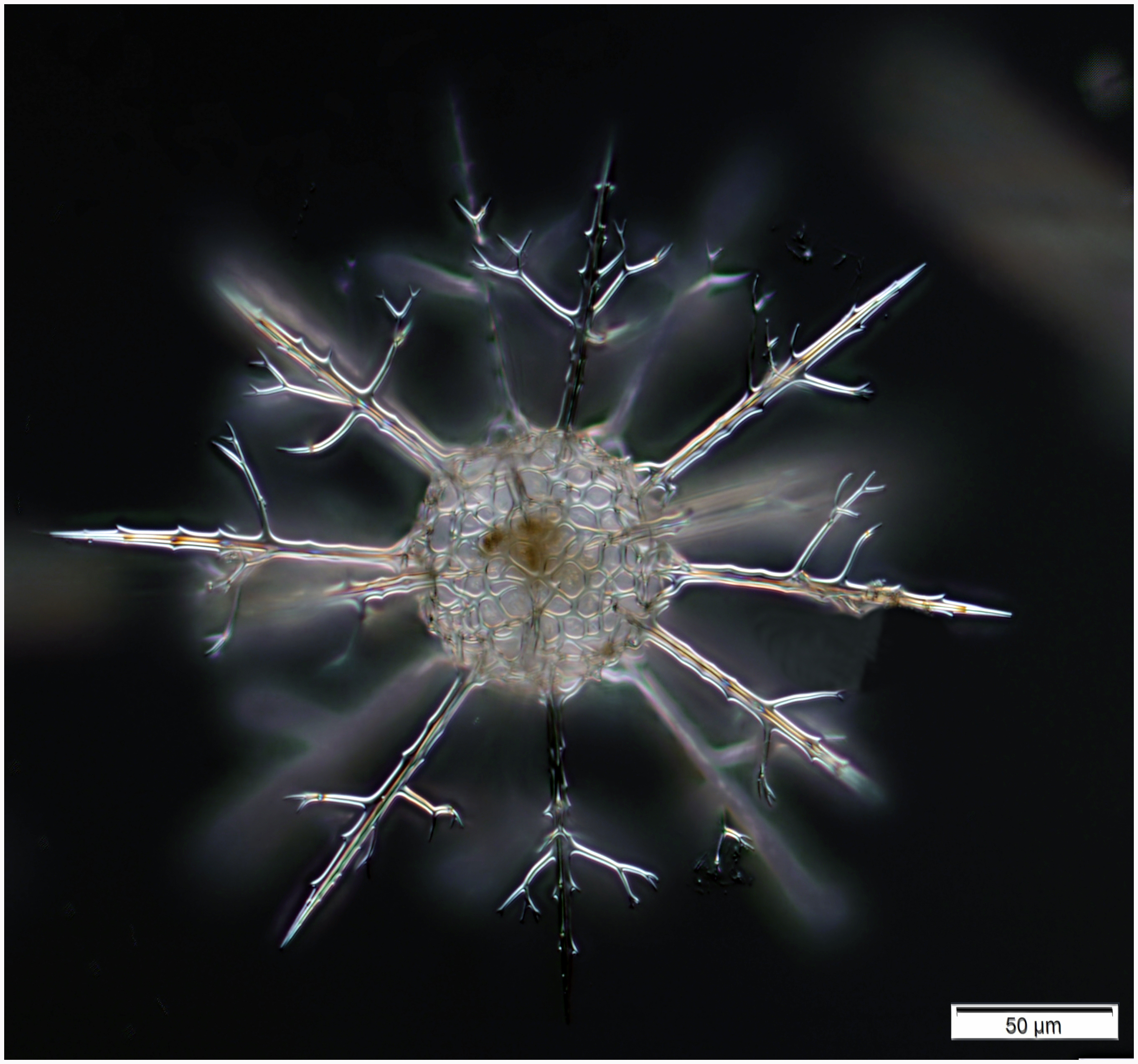
- Cladococcus abietinus

Scientific classification
- Domain: Eukaryota
- Clade: Sar
- Clade: Rhizaria
- Phylum: Retaria
- Class: Polycystina
- Order: Spumellaria
- Family: Actinommidae
- Genus: Cladococcus; Müller, 1857

Species
- See text

= Cladococcus =

Genus of single-celled organisms

Cladococcus is a genus of radiolarians.

== Species ==
- Cladococcus abietinus Haeckel, 1887
- Cladococcus cervicornis Haeckel, 1860
- Cladococcus leptus Hülsemann, 1963
- Cladococcus megaceros Boltovskoy & Riedel, 1980
- Cladococcus scoparius Haeckel, 1887
- Cladococcus viminalis Haeckel, 1860
