= Hexacontium =

Scientific classification
- Domain: Eukaryota
- Clade: Sar
- Clade: Rhizaria
- Phylum: Retaria
- Class: Polycystina
- Order: Spumellaria
- Family: Actinommidae
- Genus: Hexacontium; Haeckel, 1881

Genus of protists

Hexacontium is a genus of protists belonging to the family Actinommidae.

The genus has cosmopolitan distribution.

== Species ==
Species:

- Hexacontium arachnoidale Hollande, 1960
- Hexacontium aristarchi (Haeckel) Boltovskoy & Riedel, 1980
- Hexacontium armatum-hostile
- Hexacontium pachydermum
