= Cromyatractus elegans =

Scientific classification
- Domain: Eukaryota
- Clade: Sar
- Clade: Rhizaria
- Phylum: Retaria
- Class: Polycystina
- Order: Spumellaria
- Genus: Cromyatractus
- Species: C. elegans

Binomial name
- Cromyatractus elegans Dogel in Petrushevskaya, 1969

Species of single-celled organism

Cromyatractus elegans is a species of radiolarian in the order Spumellaria. The holotype is on a slide n°1066 kept at the Marine Dept., Zoological Institute, Acad. of Sc., St Petersburg, Russia. The type locality is the North Western Pacific Ocean and it was found during an expedition of Vityaz in 1961.
