= Stylodictya =

Scientific classification
- Domain: Eukaryota
- Clade: Sar
- Clade: Rhizaria
- Phylum: Radiolaria
- Class: Polycystina
- Order: Spumellaria
- Family: Spongodiscidae
- Genus: Stylodictya; Ehrenberg, 1847 emend. Kozlova, 1972

Genus of single-celled organisms

The genus Stylodictya belongs to a group of organisms called the Radiolaria. Radiolarians are amoeboid protists found as zooplankton in oceans around the world and are typically identified by their ornate skeletons.

== History ==
Polycistine radiolarians were first popularized by Ernst Haeckel, a German biologist who drew Radiolaria in detail and described 2775 new polycystine species. However the first taxonomic descriptions of Radiolarians were done by Christian Gottfried Ehrenberg from 1838 to 1876. Ehrenberg was the first to describe Stylodictya with what is now the lectotype species Stylodictya gracilis. Early classifications of radiolarians were somewhat arbitrary and have been improved upon since the mid-nineteenth century drawings by Ehrenberg and Haeckel. Improvements in microscopy technology have allowed more specific morphological descriptions of pre-described radiolarian genera. In addition, new species of Stylodictya and other radiolarians are constantly being discovered from both live samples and fossil evidence.

== Ecology ==
Two species of Stylodictya, Stylodictya multispina and Stylodictya validispina, are quite prevalent in ecological literature regarding Radiolarian diversity. These two species are found quite commonly in the western Pacific, particularly extending from equatorial regions east of Java to south of New Zealand. Stylodictya multispina is also known to be found in the central equatorial Pacific and in the Gulf of Mexico, however the full distribution of the genus is not wholly understood. Based on data from the western Pacific correlating Stylodictya distribution with upwelling zones, the appearance of the genus is likely highly dependent on upwelling. Upwelling is known to have a drastic effect on phytoplankton blooms and evidence suggests that Stylodictya is one of the genera of zooplankton that is heavily controlled by upwelling-related phytoplankton blooms.

The cause of Stylodictya’s dependence on upwelling is a result of the vertical distribution of the genus. Stylodictya is a surface-dwelling plankton, reaching at absolute limit as far down as 750 meters, but being heavily concentrated in the upper 200 meters of the photic zone. Being restricted to the upper edge of the vertical column means that Stylodictya’s prey is relatively wealthy in energy from sunlight but is ecologically restricted from population growth by a scarcity of nutrients (e.g. nitrates and phosphates). Therefore, in upwelling zones where nutrients rise to the surface of the ocean, Stylodictya is able to proliferate extensively.

Stylodictya, like other radiolarians, is a particle feeder and a predator of other planktonic organisms such as diatoms. The geologic age of the oldest Stylodictya-type fossils are evidence of the lasting ecological significance of Stylodictya and Radiolarians as a whole on the oceanic ecosystem. Stylodictya is food for a variety of organisms, from other zooplankton to filter feeders.

== Morphology ==
Morphological terms regarding radiolarians have evolved to be more precise since the 19th-century descriptions. Terminology is inconsistent over time, as multiple terms are often used to describe a singular structure. Therefore, each morphological term used here will be accompanied by a description of the structure.

The species Stylodictya gracilis has been described by Ogane and Suzuki and Ogane et al. as a coin-shaped discoidal spumellarian (circular radiolarian, as opposed to the cone-shaped nasselarians). At the center of the disc is a microsphere (sphere of silica that houses the nucleus and endoplasm). Surrounding the microsphere is the biretta, which is a porous rectangular box-shaped shell. Four radial beams connect the microsphere to the biretta. Surrounding the biretta are three hoops, circular rings of silica that are concave toward the center (microsphere) of the skeleton. The three hoops are connected at the top and bottom in equatorial view (viewing the side of the coin-shaped disc instead of the face) by the roof, which is also porous. There are two concentric rings of pores in the roof of each of the three hoops. Ten secondary radial beams connect the biretta through the hoops all the way to the flange (outer edge of the side of the coin shape). Four of those secondary radial beams reach past the flange outside of the rest of the skeleton and act as radial spines. Other species of Stylodictya have a similar overall coin-shaped morphology, but with slightly different characteristics. A common way to tell species of Stylodictya apart is by the number of radial spines that species possesses (e.g. Stylodictya multispina has 16 radial spines).

Being solitary spumellarians, Stylodictya must feed using its many radiating axopodia. When a Stylodictya comes into contact with a bacterium or small algae with one of its axopodia, it contracts that axopodia into its body in order to feed on the prey.

Along with other radiolarians, Stylodictya have bubble-like alveoli outside of the central capsule of the organism. These alveoli are filled with gas and act as buoyancy regulators for the organism, which is weighed down quite heavily by its silicate skeleton.

== Fossils ==
Although the geologic history of Stylodictya is sparse, fossils of Stylodictya have been found in Switzerland that date back to the Jurassic. Stylodictya-type fossils are much more common in the Cenozoic and are found in cherty limestones in New Zealand and in oceanic drill holes around the world's oceans. Even this sparse paleontological evidence suggests that the Stylodictya morphology of spumellarians has been prevalent in oceanic ecosystems for many millions of years. The distribution of Stylodictya in the rock record also gives insight into the paleoclimate at the time of fossilization. This is because the most important rock type lithified from fossil skeletons, limestone, is primarily calcium carbonate, which is not able to lithify under acidic conditions. Stylodictya, like other radiolarians, forms a silicate skeleton, not a carbonate one. Thus whenever Stylodictya-bearing chert becomes more common than limestone in the stratigraphy, that may be evidence of a shifting oceanic climate. This makes radiolarians important indicators of climate change within the stratigraphical record.

Micropaleontology is an extensive and under-studied field, so the fossil evidence that has already been collected on this genus likely only represents a portion of the extent of the genus over geological time and space.

== Significance to humans ==
In addition to the paleoecological implications of Stylodictya fossils, Stylodictya can also be used as an index fossil in stratigraphy. Radiolarians are often used as index fossils, as they are usually instantly recognizable, widespread, and individual species are restricted to a specific time frame. This may not be easy with Stylodictya, however, as the genus has existed over a long period of time and different species of Stylodictya are often not very easy to tell apart, especially in the fossil record. This may not be true in the future, as species are still being discovered, and one may yet prove to be a good index fossil.
