= Cenellipsis elegans =

Cenellipsis elegans Temporal range: Paleocene

Scientific classification
- Domain: Eukaryota
- Clade: Sar
- Clade: Rhizaria
- Phylum: Retaria
- Class: Polycystina
- Order: Spumellaria
- Genus: Cenellipsis
- Species: C. elegans

Binomial name
- Cenellipsis elegans Borissenko, 1958

Species of single-celled organism

Cenellipsis elegans is a species of radiolarians in the order Spumellaria. It is described from the Paleocene of Western Kuban.
