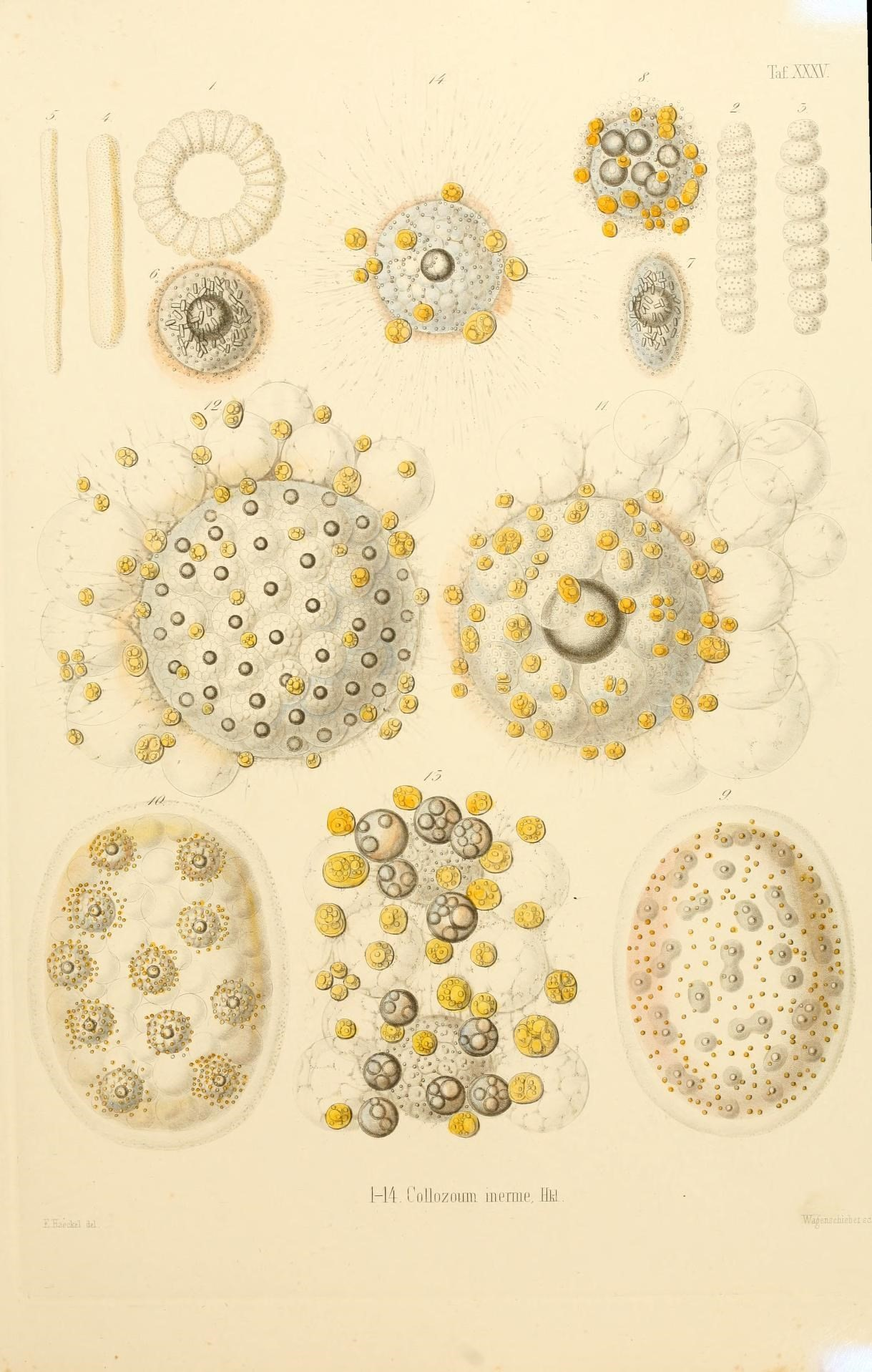
- Illustration of Collozoum inerme

Scientific classification
- Domain: Eukaryota
- Clade: Sar
- Clade: Rhizaria
- Phylum: Retaria
- Class: Polycystina
- Order: Collodaria
- Genus: Collozoum

Species
- 1; see text

= Collozoum =

Genus of radiolaria

Collozoum is a radiolarian genus formerly reported in the subfamily Sphaerozoidae, now reported descending from the order Collodaria. The genus contains bioluminescent species. It is a genus of colonial radiolarians (as opposed to solitary).

== Species ==
The following species are recognized:

- Collozoum inerme (J. Müller, 1856)
