= Patruliidae =

Scientific classification
- Domain: Eukaryota
- Clade: Sar
- Clade: Rhizaria
- Phylum: Retaria
- Class: Polycystina
- Order: Spumellaria
- Family: †Patruliidae; Dumitrica, 1989

Genera
- Patrulius; Tetratholura

Family of single-celled organisms

Patruliidae is a family of radiolarians in the order Spumellaria.

Given its lineage, one could consider that it gave rise to the families Hagiastridae and Veghicycliidae, which are known to first appear in the early Carnian years.
