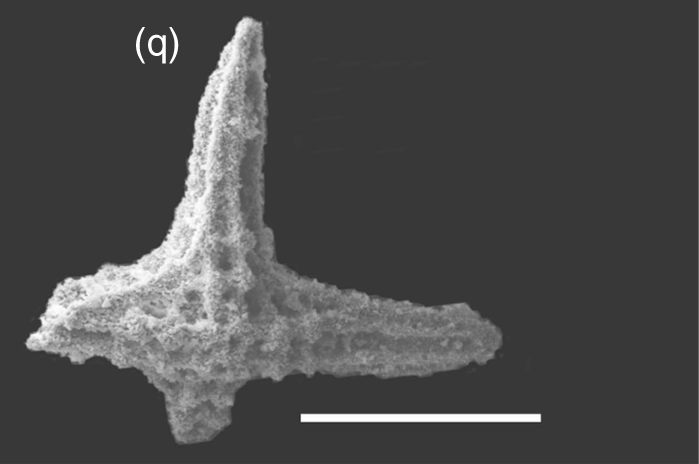
- Emiluvia premyogii

Scientific classification
- Domain: Eukaryota
- Clade: Sar
- Clade: Rhizaria
- Phylum: Retaria
- Class: Polycystina
- Order: Spumellaria
- Family: †Emiluviidae; Dumitrica, 1995

Genera
- Emiluvia; Kreutzstella

= Emiluviidae =

Family of single-celled organisms

Emiluviidae is a family of radiolarians in the order Spumellaria.
