= Tritrabidae =

Scientific classification
- Domain: Eukaryota
- Clade: Sar
- Clade: Rhizaria
- Phylum: Retaria
- Class: Polycystina
- Order: Spumellaria
- Family: †Tritrabidae; Baumgartner, 1980

Genera
- Archaeotritrabs; Ditrabs; Neoparonaella; Tritrabs

Family of single-celled organisms

Tritrabidae is a family of radiolarians in the order Spumellaria. They range in age from 235 to 125 million years.
