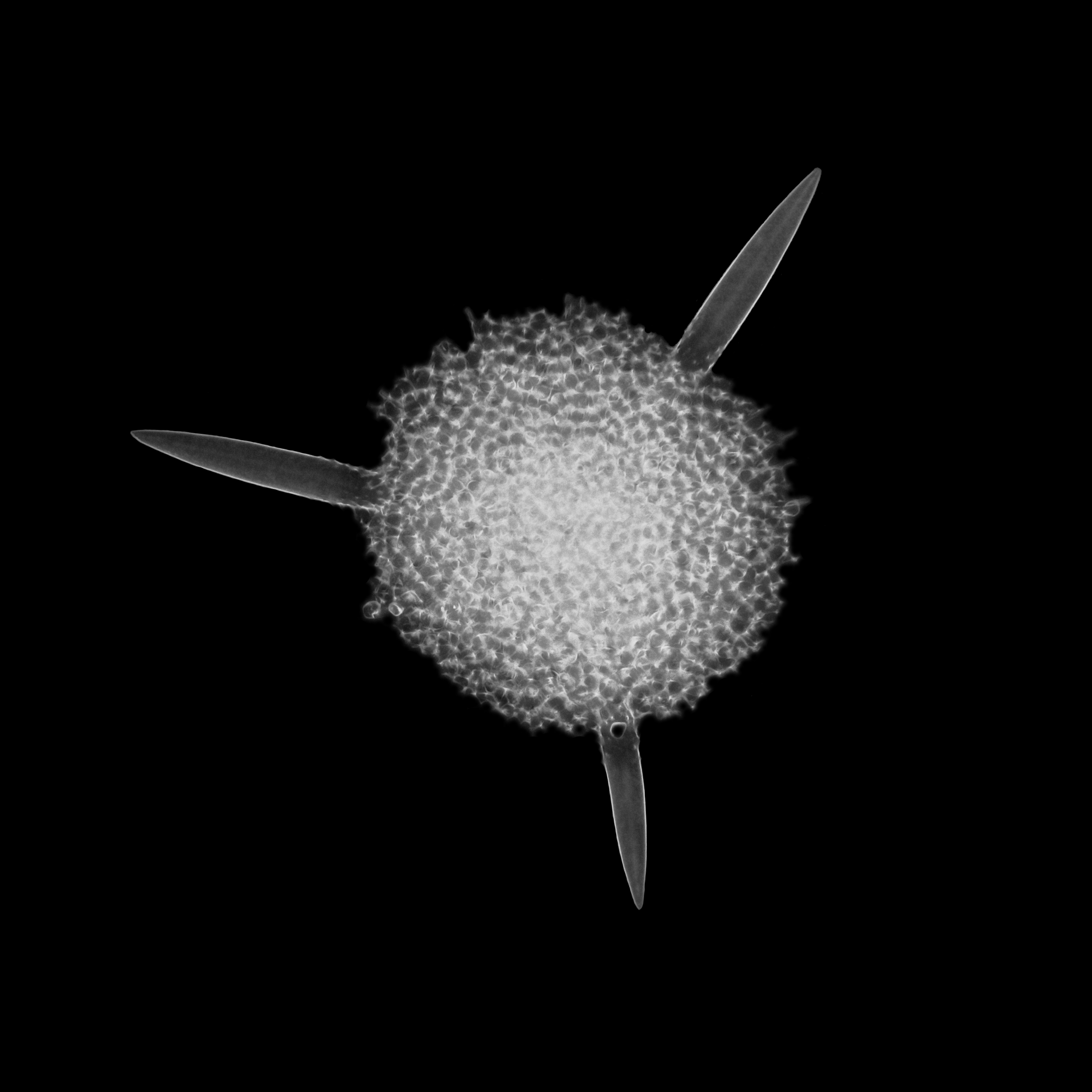
- Spongotrochus rhabdostylus

Scientific classification
- Domain: Eukaryota
- Clade: Sar
- Clade: Rhizaria
- Phylum: Retaria
- Class: Polycystina
- Order: Spumellaria
- Family: Spongodiscidae; Haeckel, 1862 emend. Riedel, 1967

Genera
- Amphirhopalum; Chitonastrum; Dictyocoryne; Euchitonia; Hymeniastrum; Perichlamydium; Porodiscus; Rhopalastrum; Spongaster; Spongodiscus; Spongotripus; Spongotrochus; Stylochlamydium; Stylodictya; Stylospongia; Stylotrochus; Teichertus; Tessarastrum; Tholodiscus; Trigonastrum

= Spongodiscidae =

Family of single-celled organisms

Spongodiscidae is a family of radiolarians in the order Spumellaria. According to the original description by Ernst Haeckel, members of the family have a flat discoidal shell, in which a simple spherical central chamber is surrounded by an irregular spongy framework.
