= Gomberellidae =

Scientific classification
- Domain: Eukaryota
- Clade: Sar
- Clade: Rhizaria
- Phylum: Retaria
- Class: Polycystina
- Order: Spumellaria
- Family: †Gomberellidae; Kozur & Mostler, 1981

Genera
- Bernoullius; Gomberellus; Karnospongella; Tamonella

Family of single-celled organisms

Gomberellidae is a family of radiolarians in the order Spumellaria.
