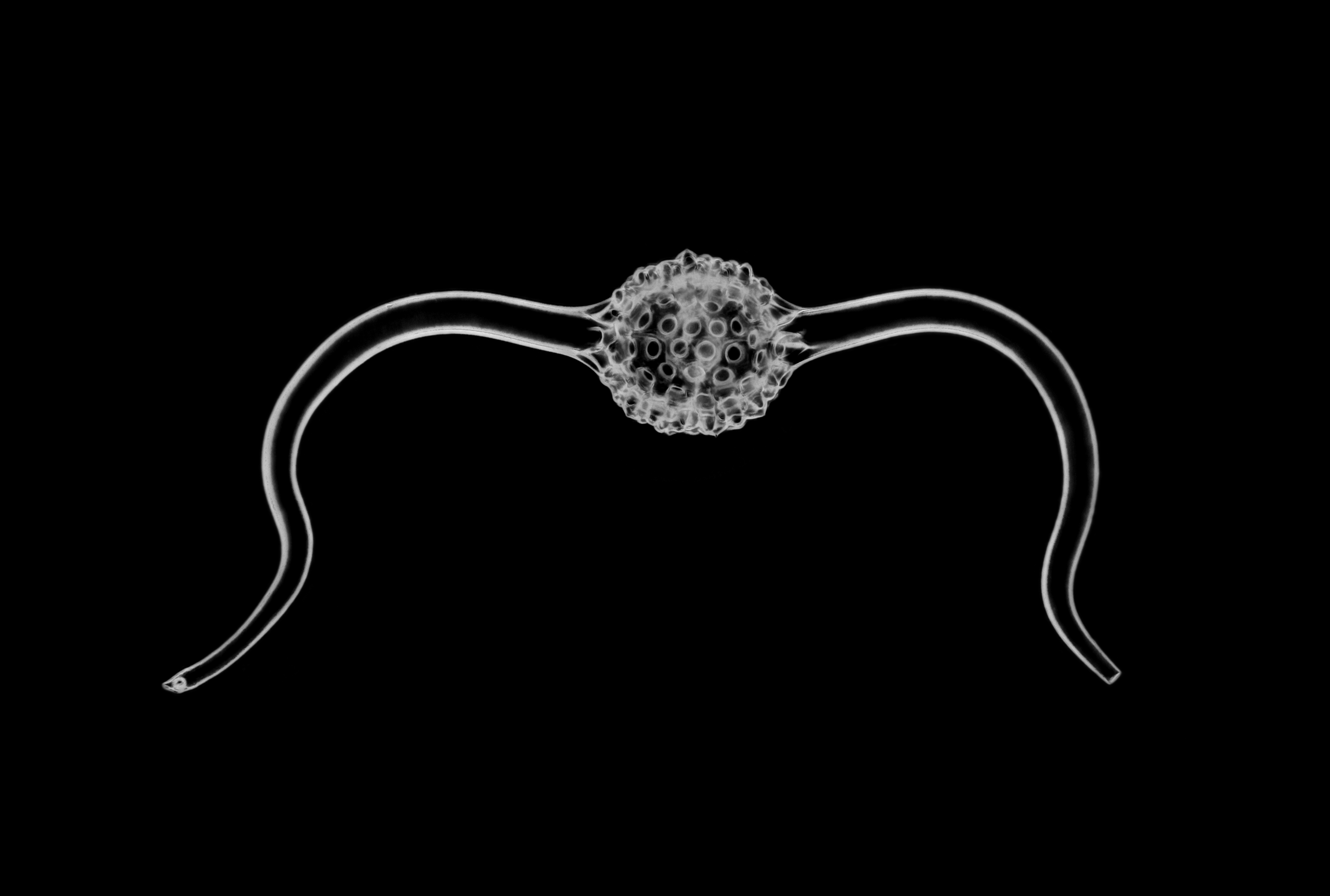
- Stylosphaera flexuosa

Scientific classification
- Domain: Eukaryota
- Clade: Sar
- Clade: Rhizaria
- Phylum: Retaria
- Class: Polycystina
- Order: Spumellaria
- Family: †Stylosphaeridae; Haeckel, 1881

Genera
- Druppatractus; Lithomespilus; Praestylosphaera; Protoxiphotractus; Spongatractus; Spongostylus; Staurolonche; Stylatractus; Stylosphaera; Xiphatractus

= Stylosphaeridae =

Family of single-celled organisms

Stylosphaeridae is a family of radiolarians in the order Spumellaria. According to the original description by Ernst Haeckel, members of the family have a spherical central capsule within a fenestrated spherical siliceous shell, with two radial spines opposite in one axis. They are solitary. i.e. not associated in colonies.
