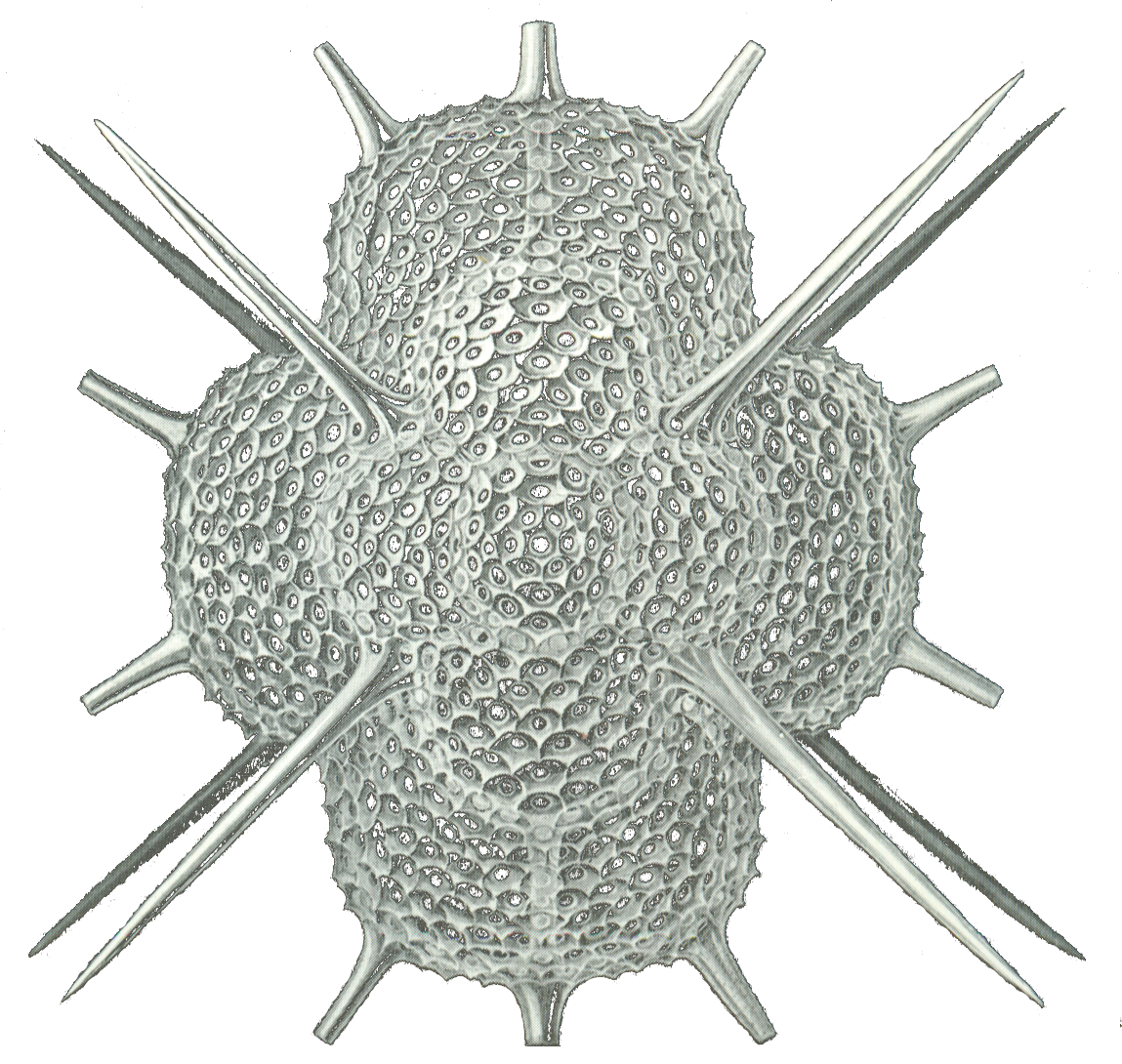
- Drawing of Tholoma metallasson (Haeckel)

Scientific classification
- Domain: Eukaryota
- Clade: Sar
- Clade: Rhizaria
- Phylum: Retaria
- Class: Polycystina
- Order: Spumellaria
- Family: Tholoniidae; Haeckel, 1887

Genera
- Amphitholus; Cubotholus; Tholoma

= Tholoniidae =

Family of single-celled organisms

Tholoniidae is a family of radiolarians in the order Spumellaria.
