= Cavaspongiidae =

Scientific classification
- Domain: Eukaryota
- Clade: Sar
- Clade: Rhizaria
- Phylum: Retaria
- Class: Polycystina
- Order: Spumellaria
- Family: Cavaspongiidae; Pessagno, 1973

Genera
- Cavaspongia; Cavidiscus; Dumitricaia

Family of single-celled organisms

Cavaspongiidae is a family of radiolarians in the order Spumellaria.
