= Catenopylidae =

Scientific classification
- Domain: Eukaryota
- Clade: Sar
- Clade: Rhizaria
- Phylum: Retaria
- Class: Polycystina
- Order: Spumellaria
- Genus: Catenopylidae; Dumitrica, 1989

Genera
- Catenopyle; Praecatenopyle

Family of single-celled organisms

Catenopylidae is a family of radiolarians in the order Spumellaria.
