= Relindellidae =

Scientific classification
- Domain: Eukaryota
- Clade: Sar
- Clade: Rhizaria
- Phylum: Retaria
- Class: Polycystina
- Order: Spumellaria
- Family: †Relindellidae; Kozur & Mostler, 1980

Genera
- Copicyntroides; Pentaspongodiscus; Tetraspongodiscus

Family of single-celled organisms

Relindellidae is a family of radiolarians in the order Spumellaria.
