= Cytocladus =

Scientific classification
- Domain: Eukaryota
- Clade: Sar
- Clade: Rhizaria
- Phylum: Retaria
- Class: Polycystinea
- Order: Spumellarida
- Family: Thalassothamnidae
- Genus: Cytocladus

Species
- 1; see text

Genus of radiolaria

Cytocladus is a radiolarian genus reported in the family Thalassothamnidae. The genus contains bioluminescent species.

== Species ==
The following species are recognized (incomplete list):

- Cytocladus major Schröder, 1907
