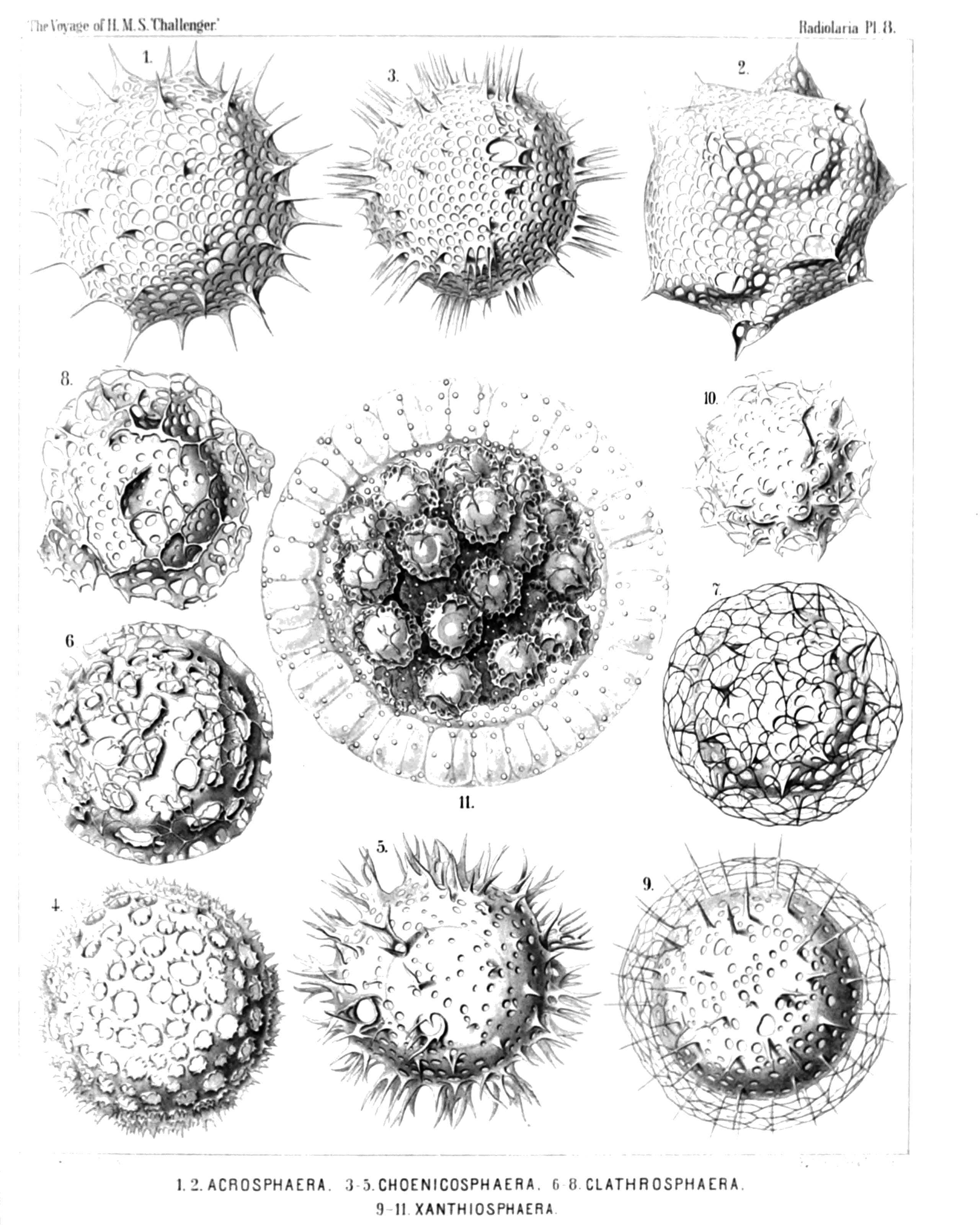
- Collosphærida as illustrated by Adolf Giltsch in Haeckel's Report on the Radiolaria collected by H.M.S. Challenger during the years 1873-1876

Scientific classification
- Domain: Eukaryota
- Supergroup: Rhizaria
- Phylum: Radiolaria
- Class: Polycystina
- Order: Collodaria; Haeckel, 1881

= Collodaria =

Order of single-celled organisms

Collodaria is a unicellular order (organisms within the order are called Collodarians) under the phylum Radiozoa (or Radiolaria) and the infrakingdom Rhizaria. Like most of the Radiolaria taxonomy, Collodaria was first described by Ernst Haeckel, a German scholar who published three volumes of manuscript describing the extensive samples of Radiolaria collected by the voyage of HMS Challenger. Recent molecular phylogenetic studies concluded that Collodaria contains three families, Sphaerozodae, Collosphaeridae, and Collophidilidae.

== Story and origin ==
Ernst Haeckel is the main contributor to species description in the phylum Radiolaria, which contains the order Collodaria. Members of Collodaria were first described in 1862. In 1881, Collodaria was defined by Haeckel in 1881 as "Spumellaria without latticed shell."

The story behind this order involved the historic voyage of HMS Challenger. As recorded in the manuscript of "Report on the Scientific Results of the Voyage of H.M.S. Challenger during the years 1873-1876," HMS Challenger embarked from Portsmouth, England in December 1872. On board this military vessel that had auxiliary steam power were physicists, chemists and biologists led by Captain Wyville Thomson, collaborating in an interdisciplinary venture to discover the diversity of life. With guns removed from the ships and replaced with long sampling rope, wire, thermometers, bottom samplers and water bottles, "naturalists" on board collected samples of marine organisms and fossils throughout the ocean waters. After the death of Wyville Thomson, his successor John Murray supervised the publication and research of collected data from the voyage at which point samples of radiolarians were passed onto Haeckel who was already a professor at the University of Jena, Germany. In the editorial notes of the report, Murray stated that Haeckel's "Report on the Radiolaria collected by H.M.S. Challenger" represents Haeckel's ten years' devotion. In Haeckel's report, all existing knowledge on Radiolaria was recorded, and older species and fossils were redescribed into three volumes.

It is indisputable that Haeckel's contribution built the foundation of morphological knowledge in Radiolaria and its orders including Collodaria. However, research in recent years has found major discrepancies between molecular phylogenetic trees and Haeckel's morphology-based phylogenetic trees. Mistakes in phylogeny were likely made when Haeckel characterized different lifecycles as two species. Some of these discrepancies are addressed in the summary of the most recent research on the phylogenetic relationships within Collodaria found in following section.

== Habitat and ecology ==
Collodarians are found throughout the oceans but high populations of Collodarians aggregate in calm and oligotrophic surface waters. Biard et al. (2015) quoted high densities of Collodarian colonies has been reported in the Gulf of Aden and in the North Pacific Ocean. The diverse distribution and abundance of Collodaria suggest its significance in ecology and the biogeochemical pathways of the oceans. Collodarians are mixotrophs involved in different trophic levels within the ocean food webs since they can actively prey on a variety of organisms including copepods, ciliates, phytoplankton, and bacteria. Collodarians can participate in carbon fixation as most species have acquired intracellular microalgae symbionts (Hollande and Enjumet 1953). Dinoflagellate Brandotodium nutricula is a common endosymbiont of Collodarians.

== Description of morphological diversity ==
Aside from the common morphology shared by radiolarians such as the axopodia, nucleus and metabolic organelles in internal endoplasm and the separation of external and internal endoplasm by the central capsule, most species of Collodaria form colonies in nature. Anderson et al. (1999) observed that the colony shapes are not species-specific. Colonial Collodarian cells can agglutinate in a gelatinous matrix that can be as small as a few mm to as large as 3 m in length. There have been observations of large solitary species (up to a few mm). Three types of skeleton are observed in Collodaria: some species create shell-like skeleton around the central capsule, others form silica spicules or have no mineral structures. The shape of central capsules and density of cytoplasmic vacuoles can vary among species and may serve as a distinguishing taxonomic character such as the separation of the genera Collophidium and Collozoum within the family of Sphaerozoidae.

== Fossil records ==
The siliceous shells of Collodaria are often preserved in sediment for millions of years. Micropaleontologists have utilized the fossil records of Collodaria to describe extinct species and the evolution of extant species through time using various notable features on the skeleton such as the size, number of radiate spines, and the presence of appendages. It was estimated that the lineage of Radiolarians, the ancestors of Collodaria, arose in early Paleozoic era.

== Phylogenetic relationships ==
=== Sister orders of Collodaria ===
In the Haeckel's work, Collodaria was named the first order of Radiolaria, and defined as "Spumellaria without latticed shell." This definition of Collodaria was further expanded to include organisms that either completely lack the skeleton or have numerous spicules that loosely scatter throughout the calymma around the central capsule. In recent literature, the definition of Collodaria has been altered with molecular phylogenetic characteristics. In Haeckel's phylogeny, the second order in Radiolaria, Sphaerellaria, includes all Radiolaria with any trace of latticed or fenestrated shell. In the last decade, Radiolarians are reclassified in five taxonomic orders as characterized by the composition and morphology of the mineral skeletons which include Acantharia with strontium sulphate skeleton, Taxopodida with silica skeleton, Collodaria, Nassellaria and Spumellaria with polycystine silica skeleton. Hence, in the current classification Collodaria now has four sister orders instead of having one sister order as in Haeckel's original tree. Collodaria, Nassellaria and Spumellaria are sometimes called the Polycystines for their shared skeleton composition character.

=== Families within Collodaria ===
Because most Collodaria species are colonial while others appear to be solitary, Collodaria was once divided into three families based on their lifestyle: Thalassicollidae, Collosphaeridae, and Sphaerozoidea. Thalassicollidae is characterized by solitary cells without a silica skeleton. Collosphaeridae and Sphaerozoidea are distinguished from each other based on the morphology of the silica skeleton. In 2012, Ishitan and colleagues performed a phylogenetic analysis and found four novel Collodaria sequences which supported the division of Collodaria into four families: Thalassicollidae, Collozoidae, Collosphaeridae, and Collophidae. However, a recent study published by Baird et al. (2015) refuted this division. In a molecular phylogeny constructed by nuclear ribosomal DNA small and large subunits of Collodaria, the skeleton-lacking and spicule-bearing Sphaerozodae, and its sister clades the skeleton-bearing Collosphaeridae and skeleton-lacking Collophidilidae were found to be monophyletic but Thalassicollidae was found to be paraphyletic. To confirm findings, molecular analyses and morphologies of members were observed. Contrary to previous beliefs, species in Collosphaeridae include solitary, colonial species, skeleton-lacking and skeleton-bearing species. Intraspecific variability in silicified skeletal structures was also observed which emphasized the uncertainty in morphology-based classification.

=== List of related orders and families ===
- Sister Orders: Taxopodida, Nassellaria, Spumellaria.
- Families within Order: Sphaerozoidae, Collosphaeridae, Collophidilidae.
