= Eugen Jørgensen (biologist) =

Norwegian biologist (1862–1938)

Eugen Honoratus Jørgensen (29 November 1862 – 14 May 1938) was a Norwegian teacher, bryophytologist, and plankton biologist. He pioneered the study of the microplankton of the Arctic region. He worked as a high school teacher across Norway before settling in Bergen where he also worked at the museum.

== Life and work ==
Jørgensen was born in Oslo where his father, Hans, was a merchant married to Olea Henriksen Wieborg. After going to the Oslo Cathedral School (Kristiania Katedralskole) he became interested in plants. He graduated in 1880 and received a teaching degree, Candidatus realium, which allowed him to teach in schools. He worked at a middle school in Tromsø. Here he studied the flora of the Kaafjord region. He later at Hammerfest and Sandefjord often shifting jobs and moving across northern Norway. In 1892, he moved back to Oslo at the Christiania Burgher School and in 1894 he moved to the Bergen Cathedral School where he worked until his retirement in 1932.

He produced a monograph of the arctic flora, mainly the mosses, in 1896 in the journal of the Bergen Museum. As a research fellow at the museum he had a space to work and from 1898. The museum had a marine biology station at Puddefjord that had been established through the efforts of Fridtjof Nansen. The station was headed by He received help from the marine station of the museum headed by Ole Nordgaard who specialized on the metazoan zooplankton and he asked Jørgensen to examine the samples and this led to a shift to the study of plankton. His first publication was on the tintinnid ciliates in 1900 and he also began to examine the literature in French, German and English. Nordgaard had samples collected from across Norway and these samples were studied by Jørgensen, who looked at dinoflagellates, radiolaria, and diatoms, which were then termed as "protist-plankton" based on Ernst Haeckel. In 1910, he received a fellowship from the Carnegie Foundation that let him travel and collect in the Gulf of Florida. In 1911 he wrote a monograph in German on Ceratium which made use of collections from around the world. He also worked on the collections made by the Danish Oceanographical Expeditions (1908–1910) under Johannes Schmidt. He published a book on the mosses of Norway in 1934 which won him a Nansen Award.

Jørgensen married Lilly Ivara Sæther in 1892 and they had a daughter. Some of his radiolaria collections are held in Oslo.
