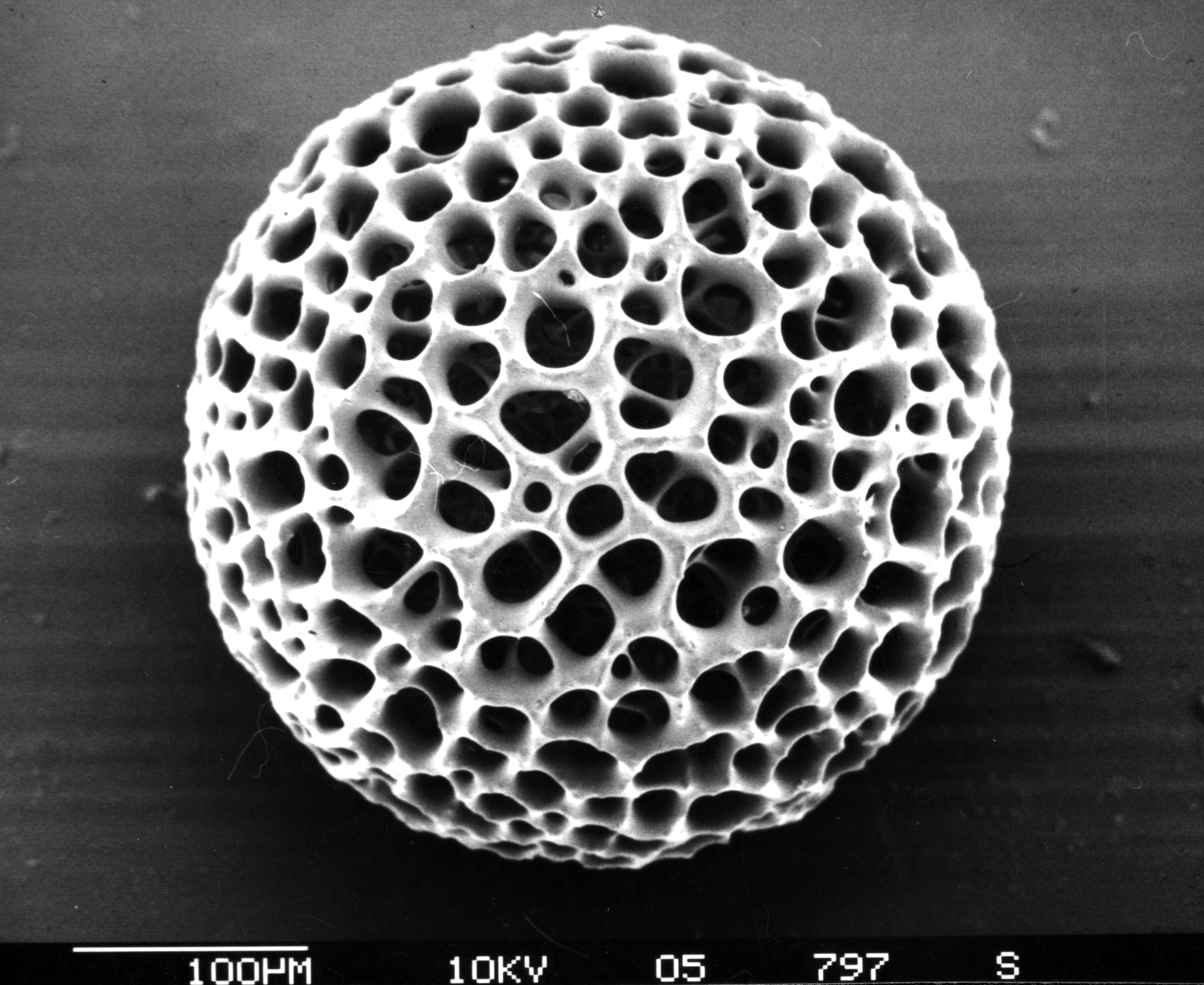
- Actinomma antarctica

Scientific classification
- Domain: Eukaryota
- Clade: Sar
- Clade: Rhizaria
- Phylum: Retaria
- Class: Polycystina
- Order: Spumellaria
- Family: Actinommidae; Actinommidae Haeckel, 1862, emend. Riedel, 1967

Genera
- See text

= Actinommidae =

Family of single-celled organisms

Actinommidae is a family of radiolarians.

== Genera ==
According to the World Register of Marine Species, the following genera are accepted within Actinommidae:

- Acanthosphaera Ehrenberg, 1858
- Actinomma Haeckel, 1860, emend. Nigrini, 1967
- Actinosphaera
- Amphisphaera
- Anomalacantha Loeblich & Tappan, 1961
- Arachnosphaera
- Astrosphaera
- Axoprunum Haeckel, 1887
- Carposphaera
- Cenosphaera Ehrenberg, 1854
- Centracontarium
- Centrocubus
- Centrolonche
- Cladococcus
- Cromyechinus
- Cromyomma
- Cyrtidosphaera
- Diploplegma
- Dorydruppa
- Druppatractus
- Drymosphaera
- Drymyomma
- Echinomma
- Elatomma
- Ellipsoxiphium
- Gonosphaera
- Haeckeliella
- Haliomma Ehrenberg, 1839
- Heliaster Hollande & Enjumet, 1960
- Heliosoma
- Heliosphaera
- Hexacontium Haeckel, 1881
- Hexacromyum
- Hexalonche
- Hexastylus
- Leptosphaera
- Liosphaera
- Lonchosphaera
- Lychnosphaera
- Octodendron
- Ommatartus Haeckel, 1881, emend. Riedel, 1971
- Plegmosphaera
- Rhizoplegma
- Saturnalis
- Sphaeropyle
- Spongodictyon
- Spongodrymus
- Spongoplegma
- Spongosphaera
- Stigmosphaera
- Stylacontarium
- Stylatractus Haeckel, 1887
- Stylosphaera
- Styptosphaera Haeckel, 1887
- Tetrapetalon
- Thecosphaera
- Trilobatum
- Xiphatractus
- Xiphosphaera
