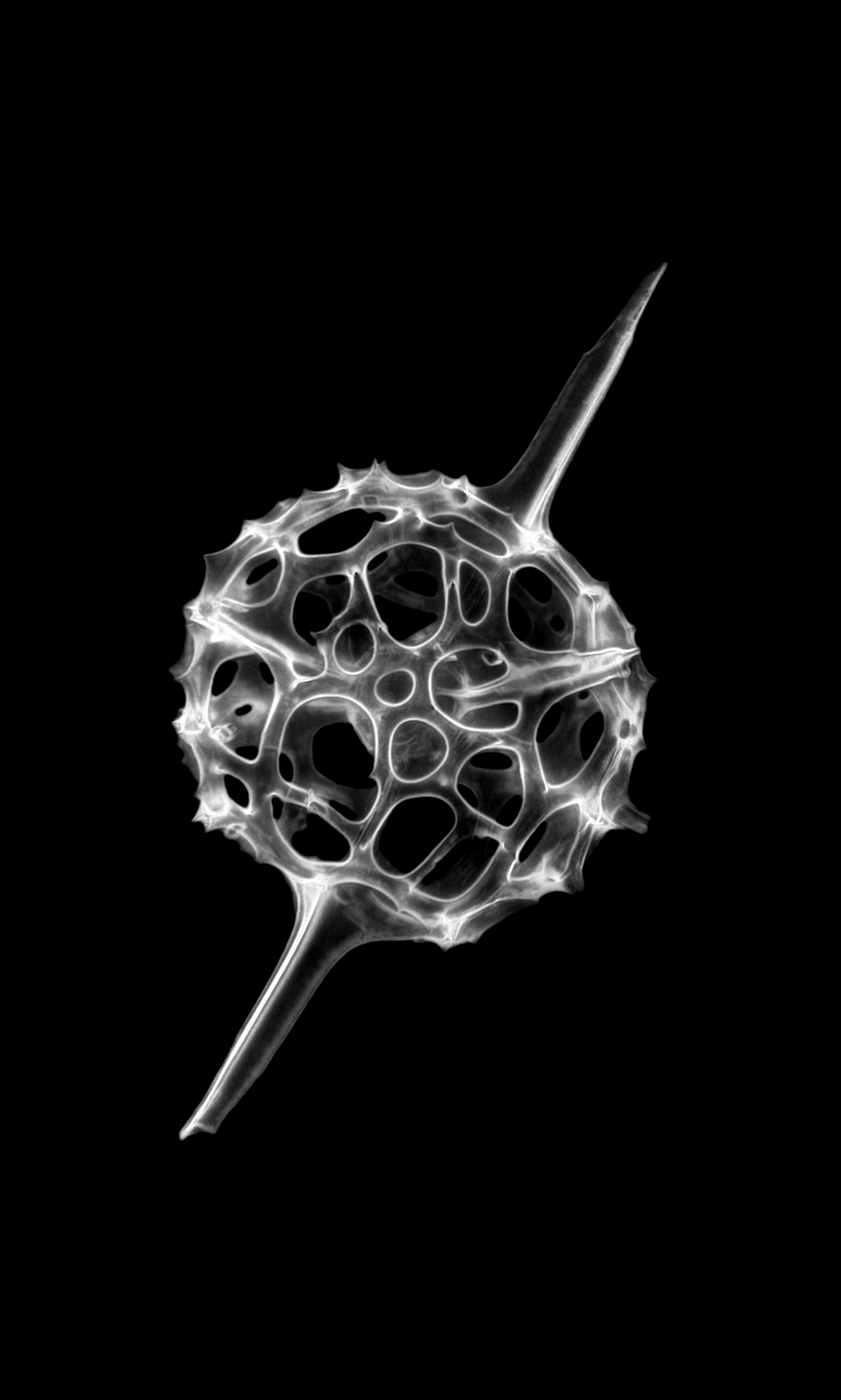
- Shell of a Hexastylus sp.

Scientific classification
- Domain: Eukaryota
- Clade: Sar
- Clade: Rhizaria
- Phylum: Retaria
- Class: Polycystina
- Order: Spumellaria; Ehrenberg, 1875

Families
- Actinommidae Haeckel, 1862, emend. Riedel, 1967; Coccodiscidae Haeckel, 1862; Heliodiscidae; Litheliidae Haeckel, 1862; Orosphaeridae Haeckel, 1887; Pyloniidae Haeckel, 1881; Spongodiscidae Haeckel, 1862 emend. Riedel, 1967; Tholoniidae Haeckel, 1887

= Spumellaria =

Order of single-celled organisms

Spumellaria is an order of radiolarians in the class Polycystinea. They are ameboid protists appearing in abundance in the world's oceans, possessing a radially-symmetrical silica (opal) skeleton that has ensured their preservation in fossil records. They are holoplanktonic, meaning they spend their whole lives classified as plankton. Spumellaria are globally distributed and a big part of our ocean’s silica biogeochemical cycle. Before diatoms, they were the main contributors to siliceous ocean sediments. They belong among the oldest Polycystine organisms, dating back to the lower Cambrian (ca. 515 million years). Their skeletons are easily preserved and therefore are frequently used as tools in paleo-environmental reconstruction studies.

Historically, many concentric radiolarians have been included in the Spumellaria order based on the absence of the initial spicular system, an early-develop structure that, by its lacking, sets them apart from Entactinaria despite their similar morphology. Living exemplars of the order feed by catching prey, such as copepod nauplii or tintinnids, on the adhesive ends of their pseudopodia extending radially from their skeleton; however, some have been observed as mixotrophs living in symbiosis with various photosynthetic algal organisms such as dinoflagellates, cyanobacteria, prasinophytes or haptophytes, which may cause their distribution to center in the greatest abundance and diversity within trophical waters.

== Morphology and shell growth ==
Like other radiolarian groups, morphology has been key to classifying phylogeny, with skeleton symmetry being one of the most important factors for classification. Generally, Spumellaria feature a concentric structure with radial or spherical symmetry, much like other radiolarian orders. Beyond that, however, Spumellaria have high diversity in their shell morphology. They have been found to maintain the shape of their shells by controlling where silification happens on their skeletons. Some species, such as Haliommilla capillacea, have very fragile spherical shells, while other species, like Spongosphaera streptacantha, have very long spines. This diversity includes a variety of strategies for growing shells. There are multiple types of growth: external shell growth, where silica is being deposited on the outside, and the shell is actively getting bigger, and internal growth, where silica is being deposited on the inside and the shell does not outwardly appear to be growing. One species, Spongaster tetras tetras, was found to go through different patterns of silica gain based on life stage (divided into young, progressively growing, and full-grown).

Spumellaria also feature a complex protoplasmic meshwork, which is a system of living protoplasm, like cytoplasm, around the skeleton. With this comes their pseudopodia, which are cytoplasmic prolongations that they use to stick prey.

== Families ==
- Actinommidae
- Anakrusidae
- Angulobracchiidae
- Archaeospongoprunidae
- Astrosphaeridae
- Bolenidae
- Catenopylidae
- Cavaspongiidae
- Coccodiscidae
- Conocaryommidae
- Dactyliosphaeridae
- Emiluviidae
- Entapiidae
- Ethmosphaeridae
- Gomberellidae
- Hagiastridae
- Heliodiscidae
- Hexaporobrachiidae
- Larnacillidae
- Leugeonidae
- Litheliidae
- Miropylidae
- Myelastridae
- Oertlispongidae
- Orbiculiformidae
- Pantanelliidae
- Parasaturnalidae
- Parvivaccidae
- Patulibracchiidae
- Patruliidae
- Phacodiscidae
- Phaseliformidae
- Praeconocaryommidae
- Pseudoacanthocircidae
- Pseudoaulophacidae
- Pyloniidae
- Pyramispongiidae
- Relindellidae
- Spongodiscidae
- Sponguridae
- Stylosphaeridae
- Thalassicollidae
- Tholoniidae
- Tritrabidae
- Veghicycliidae
- Xiphostylidae

In addition, several taxa in this order are still considered incertae sedis.

== Gallery ==
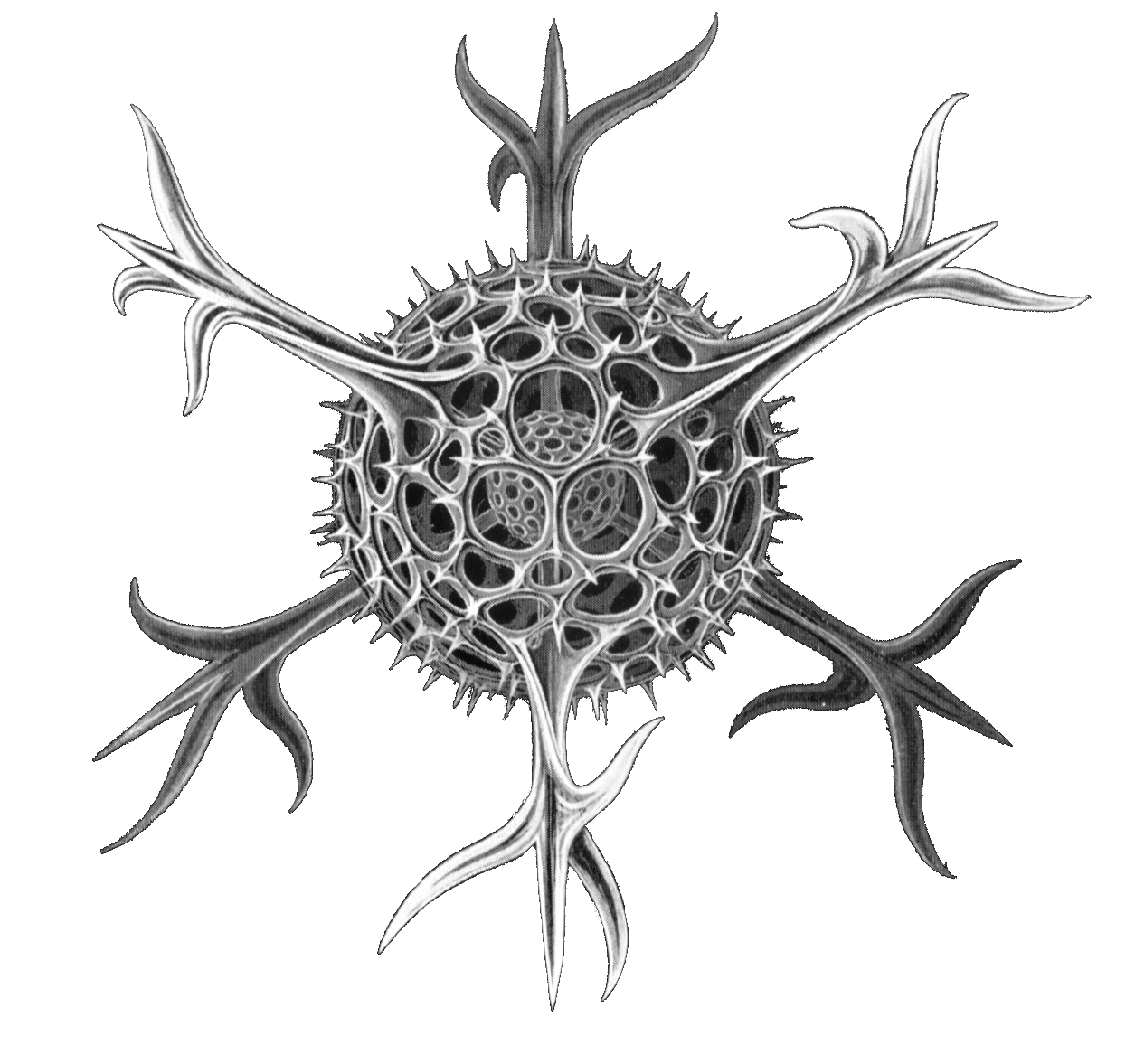
Hexancistra quadricuspis shell (Haeckel)

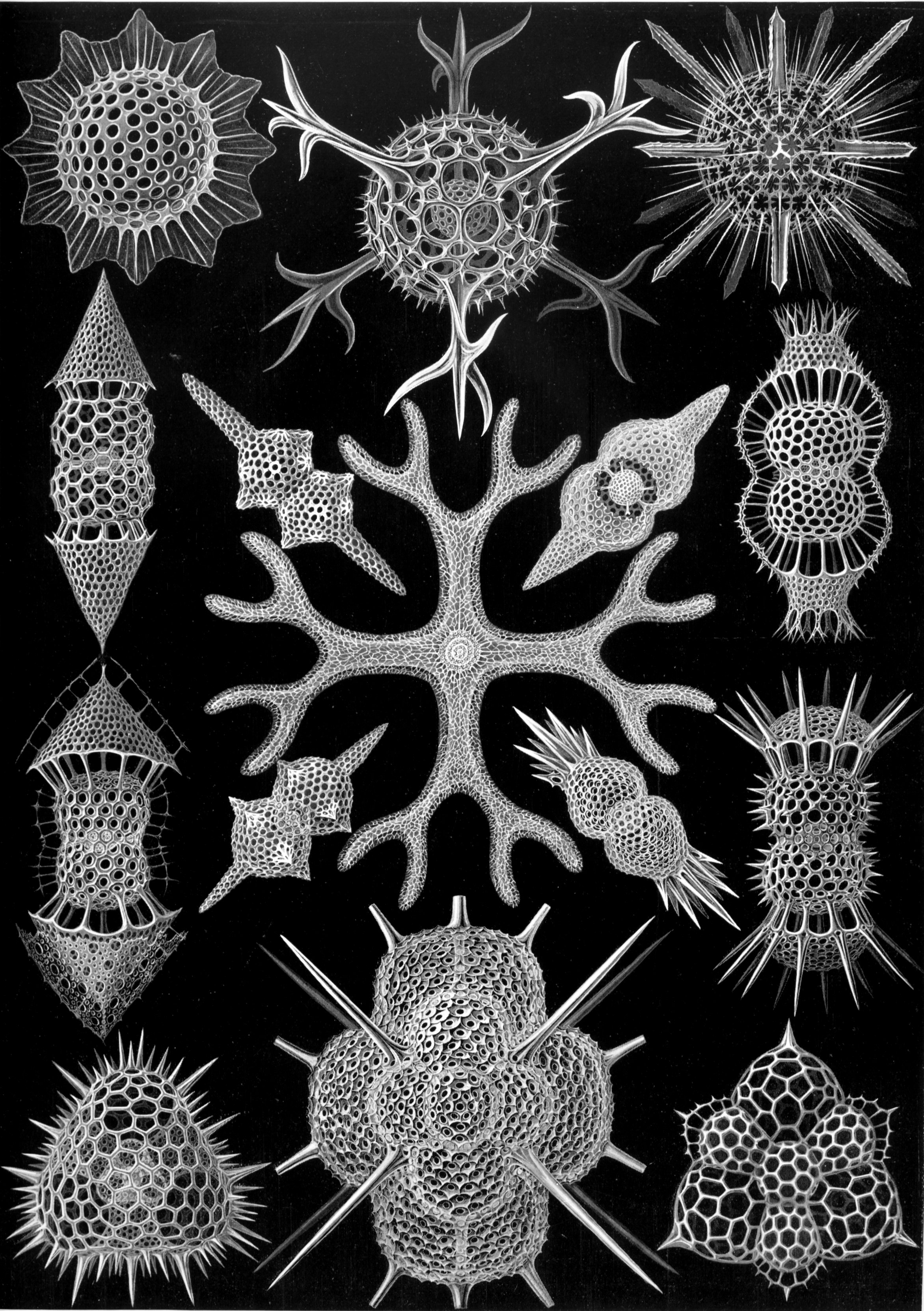
Shells of (mostly) Spumellaria (Haeckel)

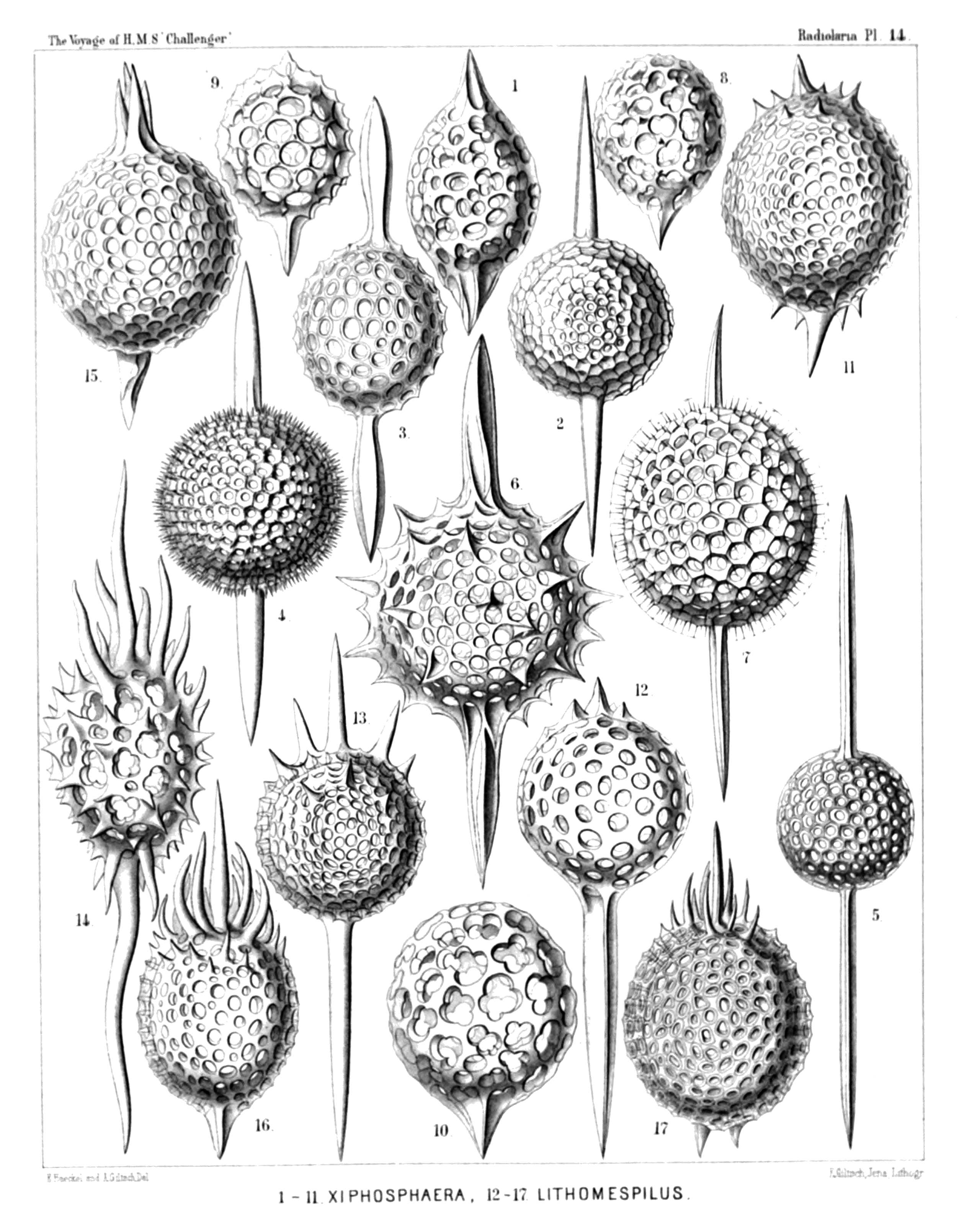
Spumellaria from the Challenger Expedition
