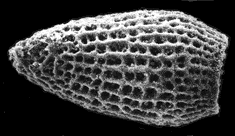
- Skeleton of a polycystine

Scientific classification
- Domain: Eukaryota
- Clade: Sar
- Clade: Rhizaria
- Phylum: Retaria
- Subphylum: Radiolaria
- Class: Polycystina; Ehrenberg, 1838, emend. Haeckel, 1887

Orders
- Collodaria; Nassellaria; Spumellaria

= Polycystine =

Class of single-celled organisms

The polycystines are a group of radiolarians. They include the vast majority of the fossil radiolaria, as their skeletons are abundant in marine sediments, making them one of the most common groups of microfossils. These skeletons are composed of opaline silica. In some it takes the form of relatively simple spicules, but in others it forms more elaborate lattices, such as concentric spheres with radial spines or sequences of conical chambers. Two of the orders belonging to this group are the radially-symmetrical Spumellaria, dating back to the late Cambrian period, and the bilaterally-symmetrical Nasselaria, whose origin is placed within the lower Devonian.

Representation of a whole Polycystine: 1. Spine (silica); 2. Cytokalymma; 3. Axopodium; 4. Filopodium, a cytoplasmic projection; 5. Alveoli, surface cavities or pits; 6. Reticulopodial network; 7. Cortical shell (skeleton); 8. Central capsule; 9. Nucleus; 10. Axoplast; 11. Medullary shell (silica skeleton); 12. Digestive vacuole; 13. Phagocytic vacuoles; 14. Prey; 15. Algal symbiont

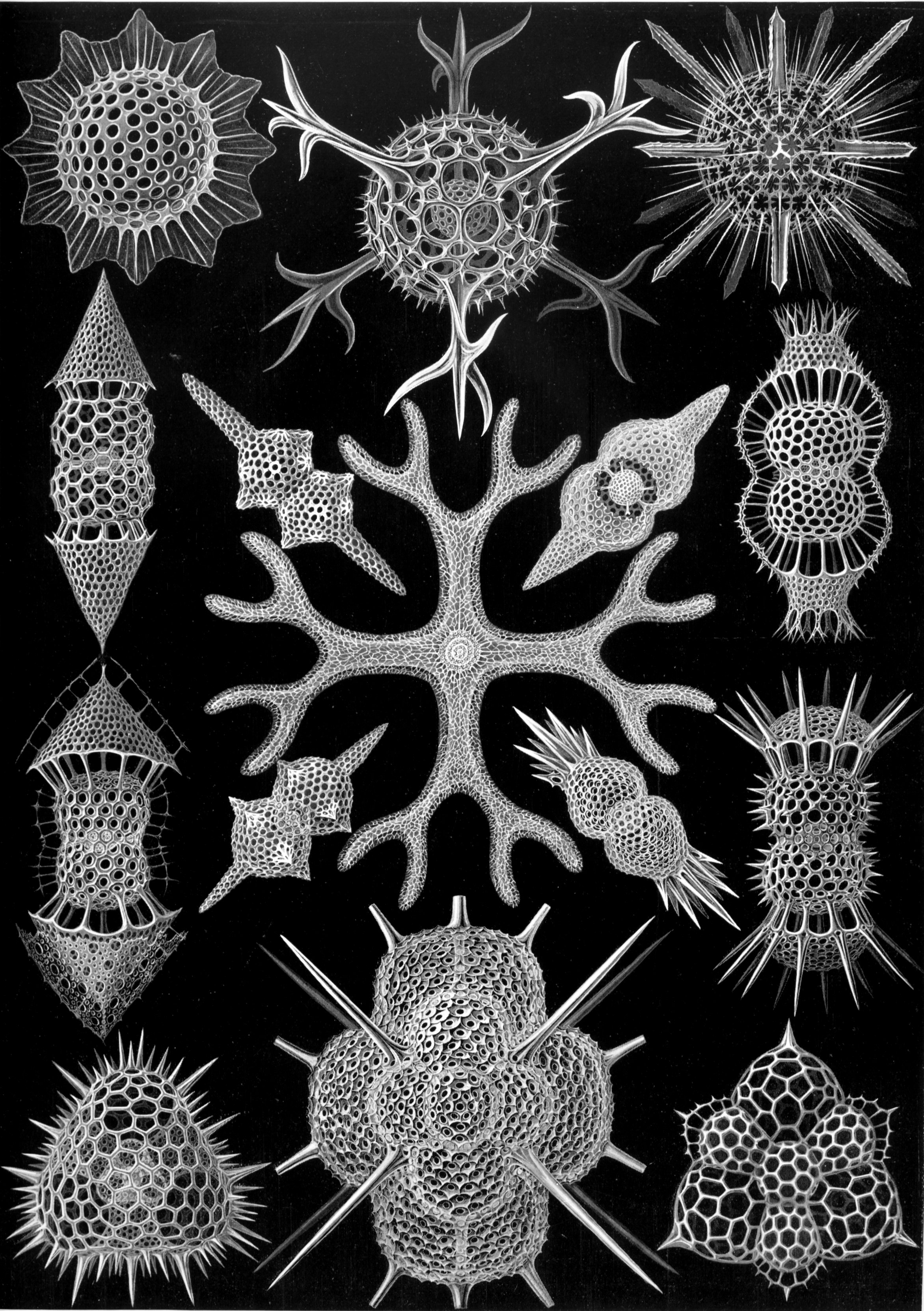
An illustration of polycystines of the subclass Spumellaria, from Ernst Haeckel's 1904 Kunstformen der Natur (Artforms of Nature)
