= Gephyramoeba =

Scientific classification
- Domain: Eukaryota
- Phylum: Amoebozoa
- Class: Tubulinea
- Order: Leptomyxida
- Family: Gephyramoebidae
- Genus: Gephyramoeba; Goodey 1914

Type species
- Gephyramoeunnmbba delicatula Goodey 1914

Species
- G. delicatula Goodey 1914; G. distracta Lepşi 1960

Genus of amoebae

Gephyramoeba is a genus of heterotrophic amoebae, morphologically similar to genera Rhizamoeba and Leptomyxa, although it is not genetically related to either of these genera.

It has been suggested that "Gephyramoeba sp." ATCC 50654 is not truly Gephyramoeba.
