= Leptomyxa reticulata =

Scientific classification
- Domain: Eukaryota
- Phylum: Amoebozoa
- Class: Tubulinea
- Order: Leptomyxida
- Family: Leptomyxidae
- Genus: Leptomyxa
- Species: L. reticulata

Binomial name
- Leptomyxa reticulata Goodey, 1915

Species of Tubulinea

Leptomyxa reticulata is a species of Amoebozoa.

A relationship to Rhizamoeba has been suggested.

== See also ==
- Leptomyxida
