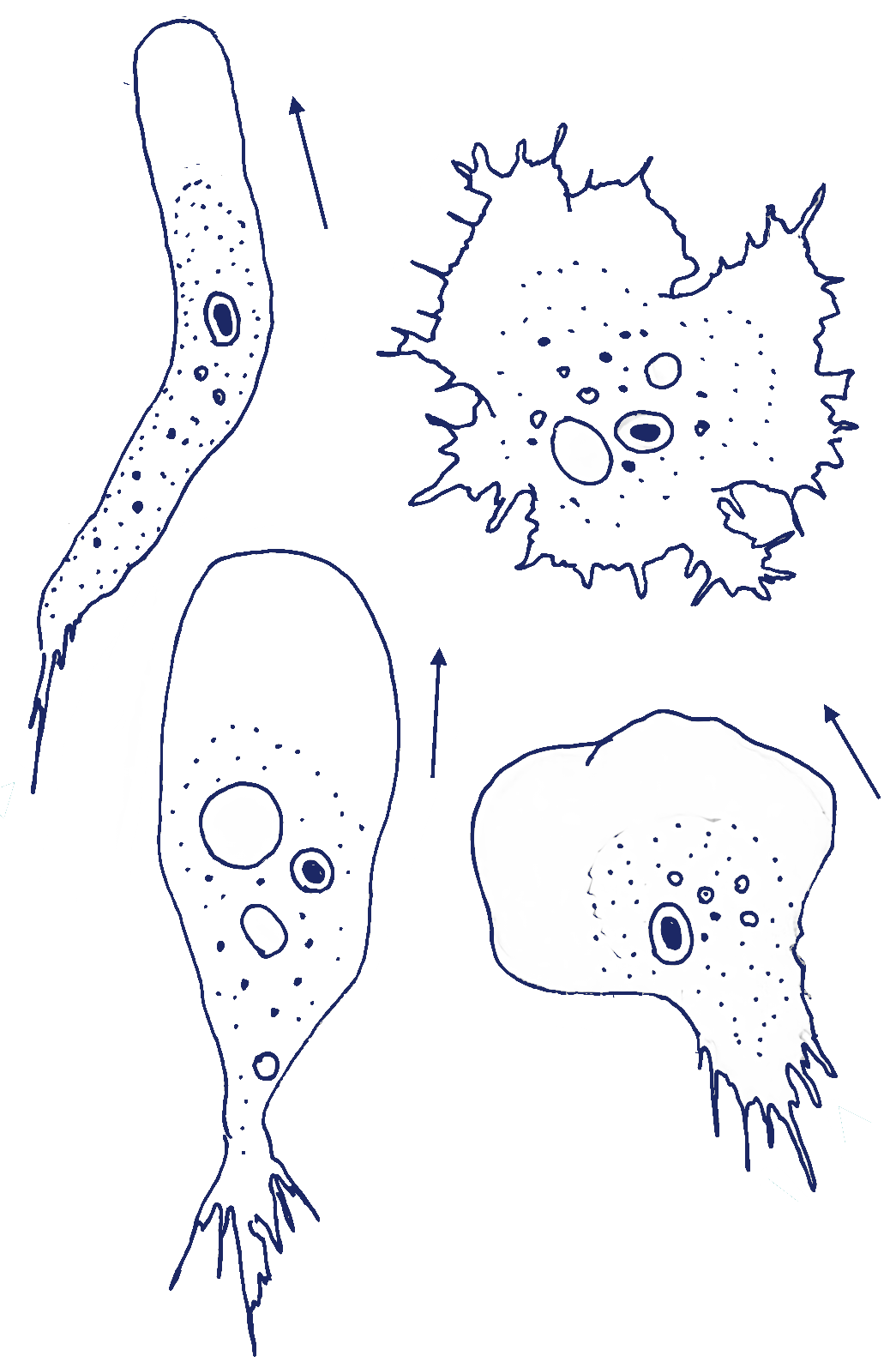
- Rhizamoeba saxonica

Scientific classification
- Domain: Eukaryota
- Phylum: Amoebozoa
- Class: Tubulinea
- Order: Leptomyxida; Pussard & Pons, 1976

Families
- Flabellulidae; Gephyramoebidae; Leptomyxidae; Rhizamoebidae

= Leptomyxida =

Order of amoebae

Leptomyxida is an order of Amoebozoa.

It includes species such as Flabellula citata, Paraflabellula hoguae, Paraflabellula reniformis, Rhizamoeba saxonica and Leptomyxa reticulata.

== Taxonomy ==
The taxonomy of Leptomyxida as revised in 2017 recognizes 23 confirmed species:

- Order Leptomyxida Pussard & Pons 1976 sensu Page 1987
  - Family Flabellulidae Bovee 1970
    - Flabellula Schaeffer 1926, (includes former Paraflabellula Page & Willumsen 1983) — 10 species
  - Family Gephyramoebidae Pussard & Pons 1976
    - Gephyramoeba Goodey 2015 — 1 species
  - Family Leptomyxidae Pussard & Pons 1976
    - Leptomyxa Goodey 1915 — 9 species
  - Family Rhizamoebidae Smirnov et al. 2016
    - Rhizamoeba Page 1972 em. Smirnov et al. 2016 — 3 species
