= Paraflabellula =

Scientific classification
- Domain: Eukaryota
- Phylum: Amoebozoa
- Class: Tubulinea
- Order: Leptomyxida
- Family: Flabellulidae
- Genus: Paraflabellula Page & Willumsen in Page, 1983

Type species
- Paraflabellula reniformis (Schmöller 1964) Page 1983

Species
- P. hoguae (Sawyer 1975) Page 1983; P. kudoi (Singh & Hanumaiah 1979) Page 1983; P. reniformis (Schmöller 1964) Page 1983

Genus of amoebae

Paraflabellula is a genus of Amoebozoa.
