= Leptomyxa =

Scientific classification
- Domain: Eukaryota
- Clade: Amorphea
- Phylum: Amoebozoa
- Class: Tubulinea
- Order: Leptomyxida
- Family: Leptomyxidae
- Genus: Leptomyxa; Goodey, 1915 emend. Smirnov et al., 2017

Type species
- Leptomyxa reticulata Goodey 1915

Species
- See text

Genus of lobose amoebae

Leptomyxa is a free-living genus of lobose naked multinucleate amoebae in the order Leptomyxida that inhabits freshwater, soil and mosses. It is very closely related to the genus Rhizamoeba, and some species have been moved between the two genera due to molecular data.

== Description ==
Members of this genus have loboreticulopodia: wide and smooth cytoplasmic projections (like lobopodia) that can also connect to each other to form a net-like structure (like reticulopodia). They differ from Rhizamoeba not only on a molecular level but also in their morphology: each Leptomyxa cell has usually up to hundreds of nuclei, while Rhizamoeba cells contain between one and up to dozens of nuclei, and the organization of the cell is plasmodial among Leptomyxa while monopodial among Rhizamoeba.

== Classification ==
As of 2017, nine species belong to this genus.

1. Leptomyxa ambigua Smirnov et al. 2017
2. Leptomyxa arborea Berney, Geisen et Burberg in Smirnov et al. 2017
3. Leptomyxa australiensis (Chakraborty et Pussard, 1985 as Rhizamoeba) Smirnov et al. 2017
4. Leptomyxa flabellata Goodey 1915
5. Leptomyxa fragilis (Penard 1904 as Pelomyxa) Siemensma 1987
6. Leptomyxa neglecta (Smirnov, Nassonova, Fahrni et Pawlowski, 2009 as Rhizamoeba) Smirnov et al. 2017
7. Leptomyxa reticulata Goodey 1915 (type species)
8. Leptomyxa valladaresi Del Valle et al. 2017
9. Leptomyxa variabilis Geisen et Burberg in Smirnov et al. 2017
