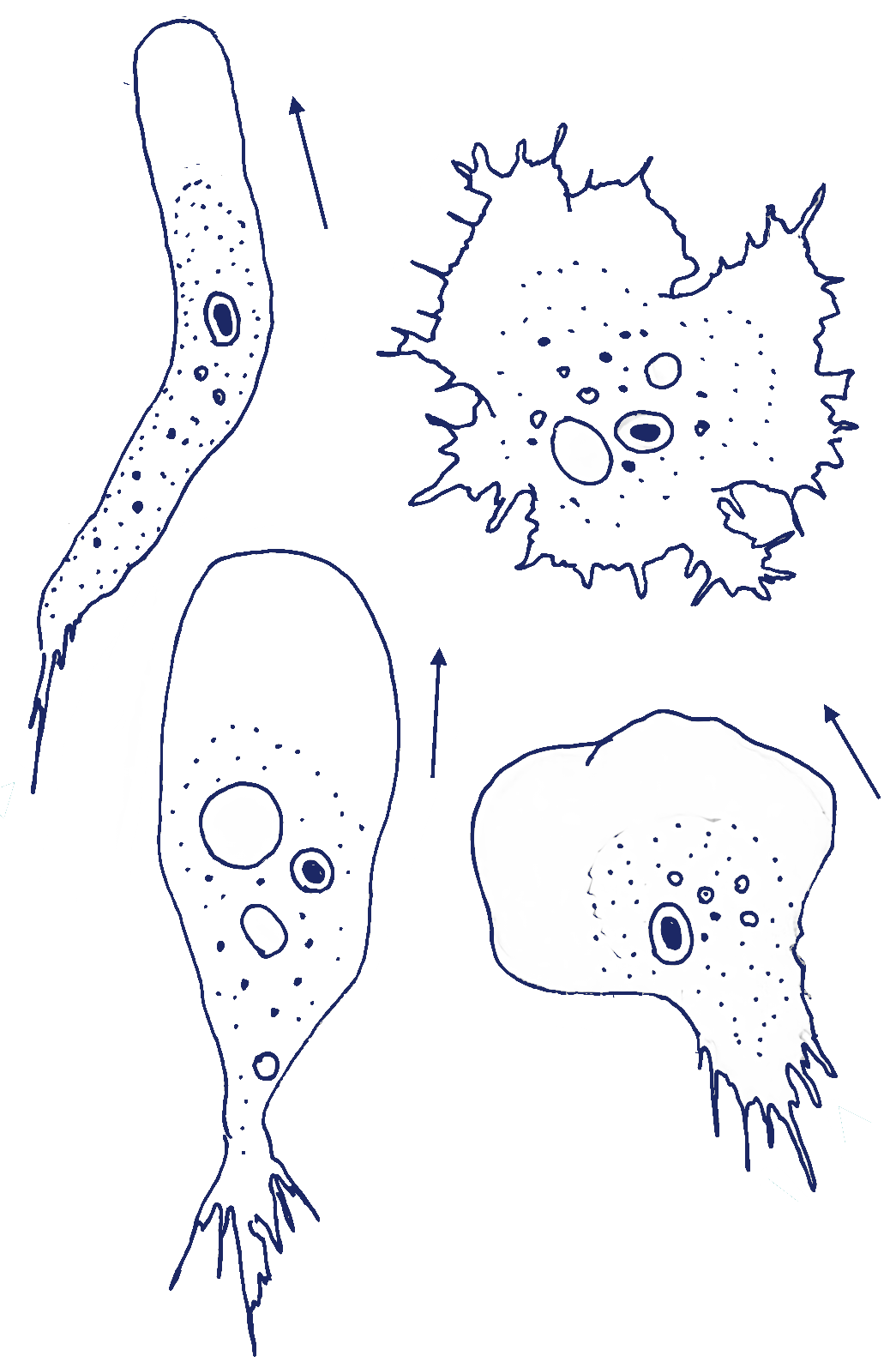
- Different monopodial shapes of Rhizamoeba (clockwise from top left): worm-like, static, flattened, clavate.

Scientific classification
- Domain: Eukaryota
- Clade: Amorphea
- Phylum: Amoebozoa
- Class: Tubulinea
- Order: Leptomyxida
- Family: Rhizamoebidae
- Genus: Rhizamoeba; Page 1972 em. Smirnov et al. 2016

Type species
- Rhizamoeba polyura Page 1972

Species
- See text

= Rhizamoeba =

Genus of marine lobose amoebae

Rhizamoeba is a small genus of free-living marine naked lobose amoebae in the monotypic family Rhizamoebidae in the order Leptomyxida. It is most closely related to Leptomyxa and Flabellula, and some species have been moved to Leptomyxa due to molecular data.

== Morphology ==
Members of Rhizamoeba are characterized by their morphology when they move, which is usually monopodial (with a single ramification), alternating between a slug-like shape and a fan shape. They have either one nucleus or multiple (less than 50) nuclei.

== Classification ==
The paraphyly of the genus caused the transfer of two previously rhizamoeban species into Leptomyxa: R. australiensis and R. neglecta. As a result, only 3 species are currently confirmed as Rhizamoeba:

- Rhizamoeba saxonica Page 1974
- Rhizamoeba polyura Page 1972
- Rhizamoeba matisi Mrva in Smirnov et al. 2017

Other possible species are not yet confirmed due to lack of published data or poor documentation. Some of these are: R. schnepfii Kühn 1996/97 (considered nomen dubium since it has not been deposited to any culture collection), Trichamoeba caerulea Schaeffer 1926 and Trichamoeba clava Schaeffer 1926 (both transferred to Rhizamoeba in 1980 but poorly documented), Amoeba clavarioides Penard 1902 (identified as R. clavarioides through light microscopy), Polychaos timidum Bovee 1972 (identified as R. timidum through light microscopy), etc.
