= Flabellula =

Scientific classification
- Domain: Eukaryota
- Phylum: Amoebozoa
- Class: Tubulinea
- Order: Leptomyxida
- Genus: Flabellula; Schaeffer 1926

Type species
- Flabellula citata Schaeffer 1926

Species
- F. baltica Smirnov 1999; F. calkinsi (Hogue 1914) Page 1983; F. citata Schaeffer 1926; F. crassa Schaeffer 1926; F. demetica Page 1980; ?F. patuxent; ?F. pellucida Schaeffer 1926; F. pomeranica Kudryavtsev 2017; F. sawyeri Tyml et al. 2018; F. schaefferi Tyml et al. 2018; F. trinovanica Page 1980

Genus of protozoans

Flabellula is a genus of Amoebozoa.

It is sometimes spelled "Flabelulla".
