= Legendrea bellerophon =

Scientific classification
- Domain: Eukaryota
- Clade: Sar
- Clade: Alveolata
- Phylum: Ciliophora
- Class: Litostomatea
- Order: Haptorida
- Family: Spathidiidae
- Genus: Legendrea
- Species: L. bellerophon

Binomial name
- Legendrea bellerophon (Penard, 1914)

Synonyms
- Thysanomorpha bellerophon

Species of ciliate

Legendrea bellerophon is a rare species of freshwater anaerobic ciliate.

== Taxonomy ==
"Lengendrea bellerophon" was the first name that L. bellerophon was given. It was named by Eugène Penard, who discovered the species. It was the second species to be added to the genus Legendrea.

=== Classification as Thysanomorpha ===
Legendrea bellerophon was reclassified to a new genus, Thysanomorpha, by A. Jankowski in the abstracts of a publication of Young Moldovan Scientists Symposium in 1967, on account of its morphological differences from Legendrea loyezae. Despite the fact that this classification (as well as the other genera established by Jankowski in the same abstracts) is invalid by the International Code of Zoological Nomenclature, the genera established by Jankowski were used in subsequent publications. After examination and reaffirmation of the similarities of L. bellerophon and L. loyezae in 2022, Weiss et al. proposed that L. bellerophon be moved back to its original genus, Legendrea.

The Thysanomorpha taxon was deleted from the GBIF Backbone Taxonomy on April 13, 2016.

== Description ==
Lengendrea bellerophon are unicellular organisms that are typically 120–150 micrometres (0.0047–0.0059 in) long when in its moving form, though some have been found to reach over 180 micrometres (0.0071 in) in length. The width is about a third of the length. Its body is oval-shaped with a truncated anterior end and longitudinal bands of cilia along its length. The mouth is located in a groove with no cilia and opens into a large cytopharynx lined with trichocysts in the front anterior quarter of the cell. L. bellerophon has a long, C-shaped macronucleus and a posterior contractile vacuole taking up a quarter of its body. L. bellerophon has extendable and retractable tentacles along its dorsal and ventral edges on the posterior two-thirds of its body. When swimming, these appear as retracted trichocyst bumps located on the cell, described by Penard as resembling "sessile pimples".

=== Similar species ===
Legendrea bellerophon closely resembles the related species Legendrea loyezae. L. bellerophon can be distinguished by its larger and proportionally longer body compared to L. loyezae. Additionally, when L. bellerophon moves, the arms along the sides retain their lateral organization, whereas that of L. loyezae trail behind it in a clump.

== Habitat and distribution ==
Legendrea bellerophon occurs in freshwater anoxic (oxygen-free) sediments, such as that found in freshwater ponds. In the first account of their existence, published by Penard, they were discovered in a marsh in Rouelbeau, Geneva. They were found in higher frequency than L. loyezae in samples from this habitat.

== Behavior ==
=== Morphology ===
Like other Legendrea species, L. bellerophon can extend and retract their tentacles. They extend and the cell flattens upon the surface they are on when they are feeding, and contract when the cell is swimming.

=== Ecology ===
Legendrea bellerophon is a free-living, non-parasitic organism. Endosymbiotic or parasitic prokaryotes are present inside its cytoplasm.
