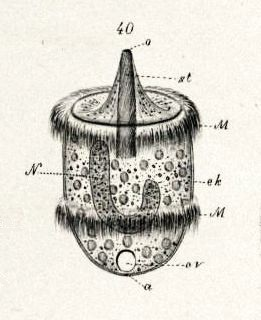
- Didinium nasutum as illustrated by Schewiakoff, 1896

Scientific classification
- Domain: Eukaryota
- Supergroup: Alveolata
- Phylum: Ciliophora
- Class: Litostomatea
- Order: Haptorida
- Family: Didiniidae
- Genus: Didinium; Stein, 1859

= Didinium =

Genus of single-celled organisms

Didinium is a genus of unicellular ciliates with at least ten accepted species. All are free-living carnivores. Most are found in fresh and brackish water, but three marine species are known. Their diet consists largely of Paramecium, although they will also attack and consume other ciliates. Some species, such as D. gargantua, also feeds on non-ciliate protists, including dinoflagellates, cryptomonads, and green algae.

== Appearance and reproduction ==
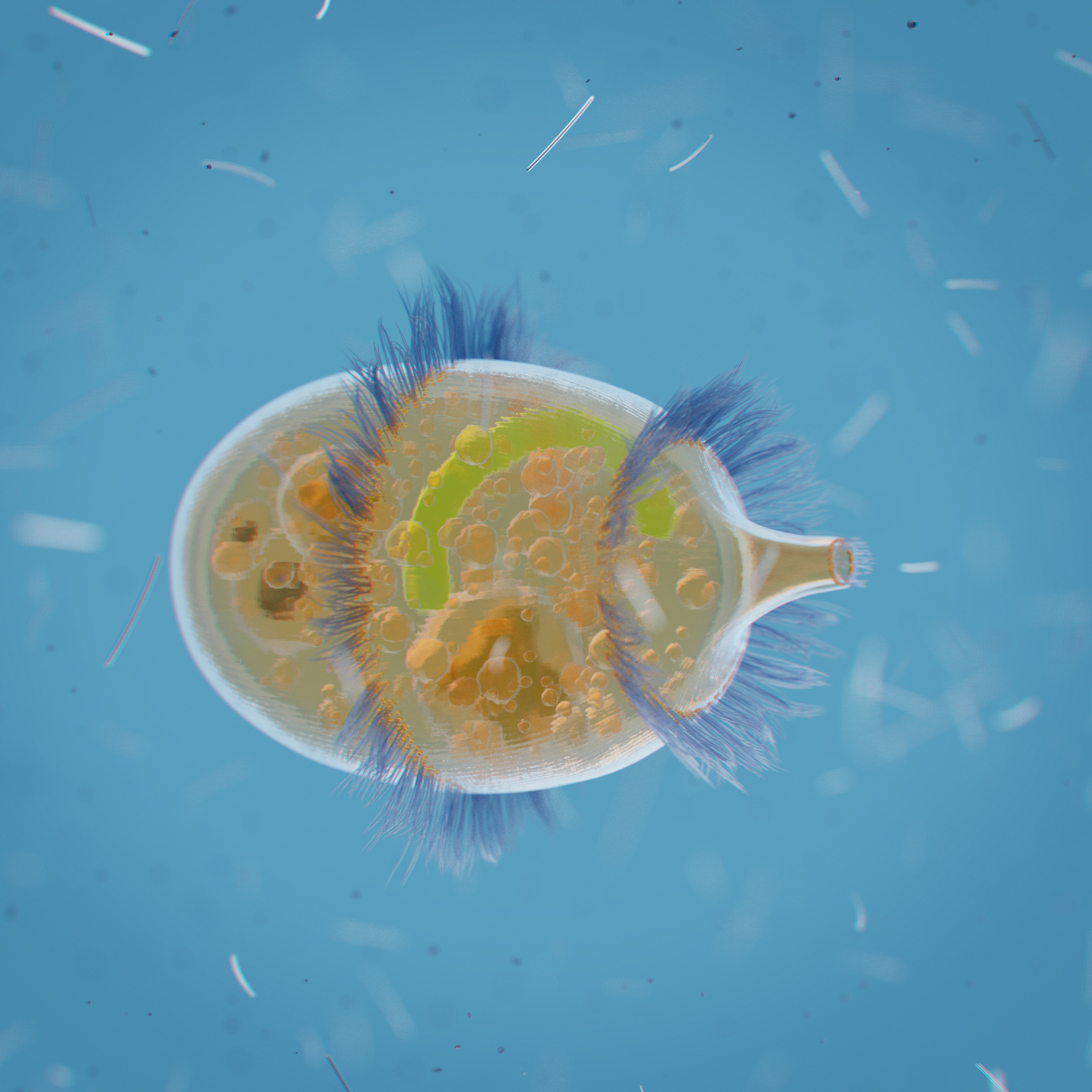
Didinium nasutum CGI illustration by Denis Zarubin, 2021

Didinia are rounded, oval, or barrel-shaped and range in length from 50 to 150 micrometres. The cell body is encircled by two ciliary bands, or pectinelles, an upper band and a lower band just below the midline. This distinguishes them from the related genus Monodinium, which have only a single band, except during cell division. The pectinelles are used to move Didinium through water by rotating the cell around its axis. At the anterior end, a cone-shaped structure protrudes, supported by a palisade of stiff microtubular rods (nematodesmata). This cone encloses the cytostome, or "mouth" opening, as in other haptorian ciliates. The dimensions of this protuberance vary among the different species.

The macronucleus is long and may be curved, horseshoe-shaped, or twisted into a shape resembling a figure eight. A contractile vacuole and anal aperture are in the posterior of the cell.

Like all ciliates, Didinia reproduces asexually via binary fission or sexually after undergoing conjugation.

== Didinium nasutum ==
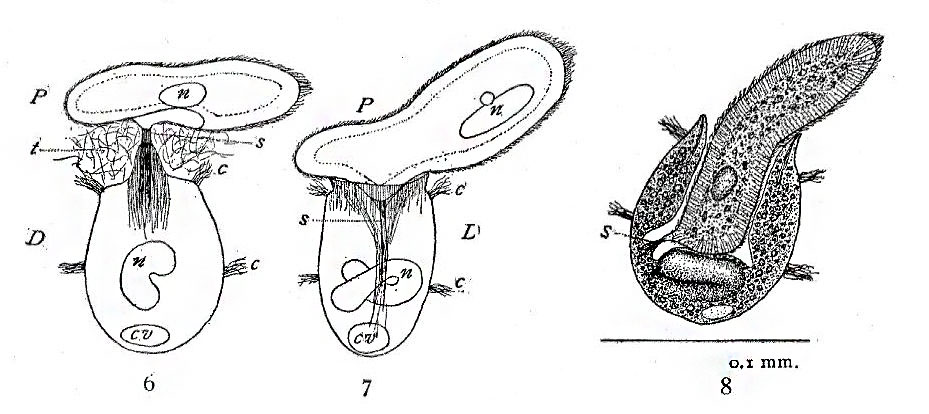
Didinium nasutum consuming a Paramecium. Illustration by S. O. Mast, 1909

Much of what has been published about this genus is based on numerous studies of a single species, Didinium nasutum. A voracious predator, D. nasutum uses specialized structures called toxicysts to ensnare and paralyze its ciliate prey. Once captured, the prey is engulfed by Didinium's expandible cytostome.

While D. nasutum is sometimes described as feeding exclusively upon Paramecium, it has been shown that the organism will readily devour other ciliate species, including Colpoda, Colpidium campylum, Tetrahymena pyriformis, Coleps hirtus, and Lacrymaria olor. Moreover, strains of Didinium raised on a Colpidium campylum will actually show a preference for a diet made up of that species, as well as a diminished ability to kill and ingest Paramecia.

In the absence of food, D. nasutum will encyst, lying dormant within a protective coating. In the laboratory, other environmental stimuli, such as the age of the growth medium or the accumulation of certain metabolic waste products, can also trigger encystment. When the encysted form of D. nasutum is exposed to a vigorous culture of Paramecium, it will excyst, reverting to its active, swimming form.

Didinium cysts have been shown to remain viable for at least 10 years.

== History and classification ==
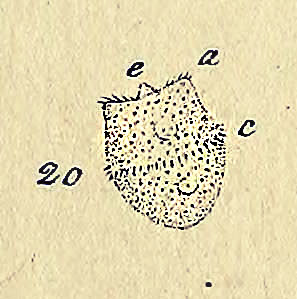
Vorticella nasuta, from O. F. Müller, 1786

In the 18th century, Didinium was discovered by the naturalist O.F. Müller and described in his Animalcula Infusoria under the name Vorticella nasuta. In 1859, Samuel Friedrich Stein moved the species to the newly created genus Didinium, which he placed within the order Peritricha, alongside other ciliates which have a ciliary fringe at the anterior of the cell, such as Vorticella and Cothurnia. Later in the century, under the taxonomical scheme created by Otto Bütschli, Didinium was removed from among the Peritrichs, and placed in the order Holotricha. In 1974, John O. Corliss created the order Haptorida, within the subclass Haptoria, for "rapacious carnivorous forms" such as Didinium, Dileptus, and Spathidium. This group has since been placed in the class Litostomatea Small & Lynn, 1981.

Genetic analysis of Haptorian ciliates has shown that they do not form a monophyletic group.

== List of Species ==
Didinium alveolatum Kahl, 1930
Didinium armatum Penard, 1922
Didinium balbianii Fabre-Domergue, 1888
Didinium bosphoricum Hovasse, 1932
Didinium chlorelligerum Kahl, 1935
Didinium faurei Kahl, 1930
Didinium gargantua Meunier, 1910
Didinium impressum Kahl, 1926
Didinium minimum
Didinium nasutum (Müller, 1773) Stein, 1859
