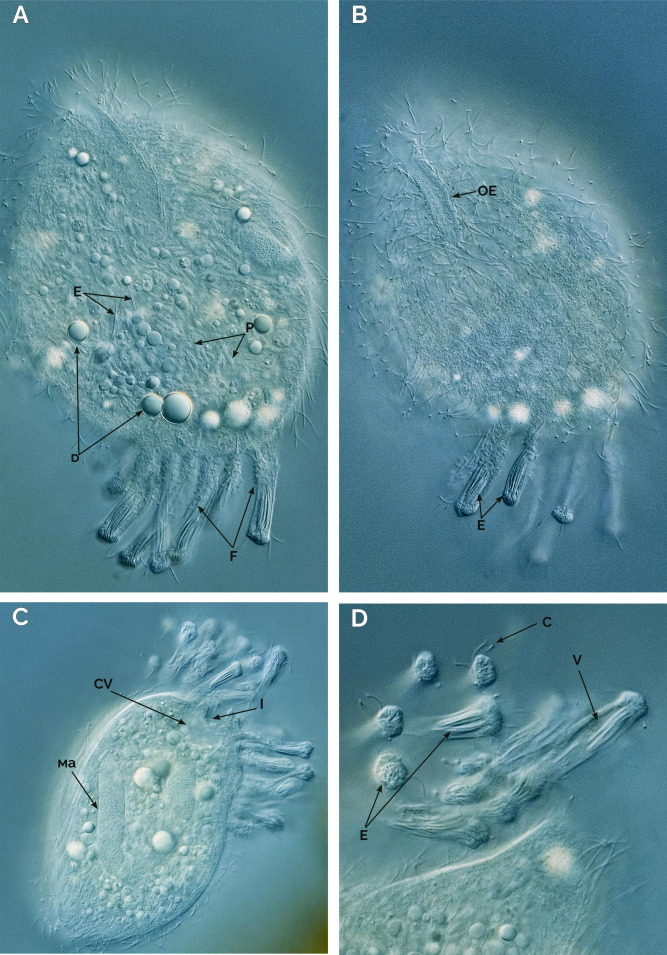

Scientific classification
- Domain: Eukaryota
- Clade: Sar
- Clade: Alveolata
- Phylum: Ciliophora
- Class: Litostomatea
- Order: Haptorida
- Family: Spathidiidae
- Genus: Legendrea
- Species: L. loyezae

Binomial name
- Legendrea loyezae (Fauré-Fremiet, 1908)

= Legendrea loyezae =

Species of freshwater anaerobic ciliate

Legendrea loyezae is a rare species of freshwater anaerobic ciliate. Only six accounts of L. loyezae specimens have been published as of 2022.

== Taxonomy ==
Phylogenetic analysis of a partial L. loyezae 18S ribosomal RNA sequence indicate it is a member of the Family Spathidiidae and Order Haptorida. It is also more closely related to the species Apertospathula oktemae of the family Apertospathulidae and Arcuospathidium sp. than other Spathidiidae. The sequence is also a sister group to a clade of three Epispathidium sequences.

== Description ==
Legendrea loyezae are unicellular organisms 75–120 micrometres (0.0030–0.0047 in) long and 40–55 micrometres (0.0016–0.0022 in) wide, and are ovoid and slightly flattened in shape. It has uniform cilia on its body and a complete oral bulge (bulge located at its mouth) with dense rows of extrusomes. It possesses one elongated, horseshoe-shaped macronucleus and a contractile vacuole at its posterior end.

Legendrea loyezae possesses 15–30 tentacles protruding from an indentation in its posterior, with 5–8 cilia in a ring and densely packed, curved, needle-shaped extrusomes protruding from a vacuole on each tentacle tip. When swimming, these tentacles retract and trail behind the cell, which is heart-shaped due to the indentation; when stationary, the cell flattens against a surface such that it takes on a rounder shape and the tentacles fully extend, becoming narrower and reaching up to twice the length of the body. The vacuole also expands when the tentacles extend.

== Habitat and distribution ==
Legendrea loyezae occurs in freshwater anoxic (oxygen-free) sediments, such as that found in freshwater ponds. Fauré-Fremiet's first account of their existence states they were first found in a pond near Paris, France. In the second account of their existence, published by Eugene Penard, they were discovered in a marsh in Rouelbeau, Geneva. In 2014, specimens were found in freshwater ponds in Germany. In 2021 and 2022, specimens were found in woodland freshwater lakes in Warsaw, Poland.

== Behavior ==
=== Feeding phase ===
When feeding, L. loyezae assumes its stationary form for days at a time to wait for prey. The cilia at the tip of the extended tentacles perform a "beating" motion, while the tip with extrusomes moved like "fish bait". In their 2022 article, Weiss et al. theorized that the tentacles capture prey in the extrusomes, then move it to the cytostome (mouth) to be ingested.

=== Movement ===
During the feeding phase, L. loyezae were observed as not reacting to tapping or short bursts of UV light on the microscope slides they were residing on. However, it did move in response to the nearby presence of Monomorphina sp., a photosynthetic organism, likely in reaction to its production of oxygen. In such an event, L. loyezae can contract its tentacles in about 30 seconds, changing from its stationary form to its swimming form as it moves to an anoxic location where it may resume its feeding phase.

=== Ecology ===
Legendrea loyezae is a free-living, non-parasitic organism. Endosymbiotic prokaryotes are present inside its cytoplasm.
