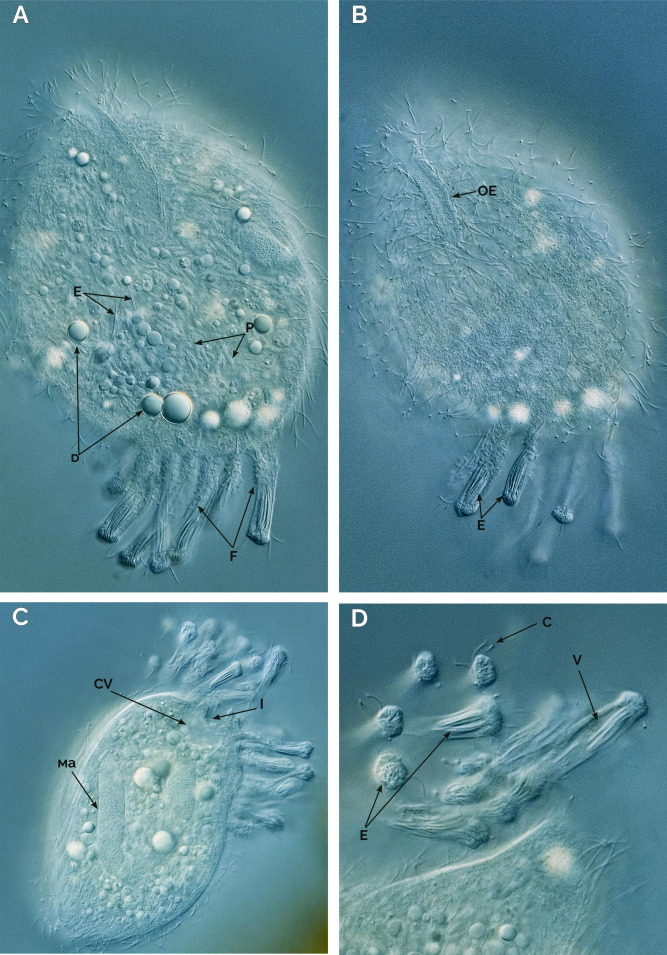
- The type species Legendrea loyezae on differential interference contrast.

Scientific classification
- Domain: Eukaryota
- Clade: Sar
- Clade: Alveolata
- Phylum: Ciliophora
- Class: Litostomatea
- Order: Haptorida
- Family: Spathidiidae
- Genus: Legendrea; Fauré-Fremiet, 1908

Type species
- Legendrea loyezae Fauré-Fremiet, 1908

Species
- See text

Synonyms
- Thysanomorpha Jankowski, 1967; Penardiella Penard, 1922; Lacerus Jankowski, 1967

= Legendrea =

Genus of ciliate protists

Legendrea is a genus of extremely rare ciliates first described by French biologist Emmanuel Fauré-Fremiet in 1908, rediscovered and re-examined in 2022.

== Classification ==
The genus has 5 species including the type species, Legendrea loyezae, described in 1908. Other genera (e.g. Lacerus and Thysanomorpha) were only distinguished from Legendrea by their physical appearance, not affinities. These genera were misidentifications and were synonymised with Legendrea along with their respective species. First true taxonomic assignment of the cilliate was made in December 2022. The current 5 species are:

- Legendrea bellerophon Penard, 1914 [=Thysanomorpha bellerophon (Penard, 1914) Jankowski, 1967]
- Legendrea crassa Penard, 1922 [=Penardiella crassa (Penard, 1922) Kahl, 1930]
- Legendrea interrupta Penard, 1922
- Legendrea loyezae Faure-Fremiet, 1908
- Legendrea pespelicani Penard, 1922 [=Lacerus pespelicani (Penard, 1922) Jankowski, 1967]

== Taxonomic affinities ==
The genus (and species) are distinguishable from one another by the length of their finger-like tentacles. These tentacles are located at the rear end of the cell. Varied descriptions of these tentacles have been attributed to their different morphologies when swimming versus at rest, such as in the case of L. loyezae. Phylogenetic analysis of the 18S rRNA gene within L. loyezae placed the genus within the family Spathidiidae taxonomically ranked under the order of Haptorida. A shorter gene of 18S rRNA was used to classify the species and so its affinity should be carefully interpreted with there being the likelihood of it changing to a new affinity. The sequence used to determine the identity of L. loyezae implies that it forms a sister group with the sequences from the re-identified Epispathidium papilliferum as well as an undescribed species of the same genus. The Epispathidium possessed protruding papillae that are analogous to those found on L. loyezae, although the papillae on Epispathidium were only present on its oral region.

=== Genus divisions ===
Although A. Jankowski did not directly observe any members of Legendrea, Jankowski published a revision of the genus that divided Legendrea into two genera based on morphological differences: Lacerus and Thysanomorpha. Legendrea bellerophon was reclassified to the genus Thysanomorpha and was renamed Thysanomorpha bellerophon, re-described as having a serrated body edge/surface with an uneven series of outgrowths with trichomes. These names of the species and genera were in use by subsequent publications, but were challenged by Weiss et al. in 2022 as misidentifications of Legendrea species.
