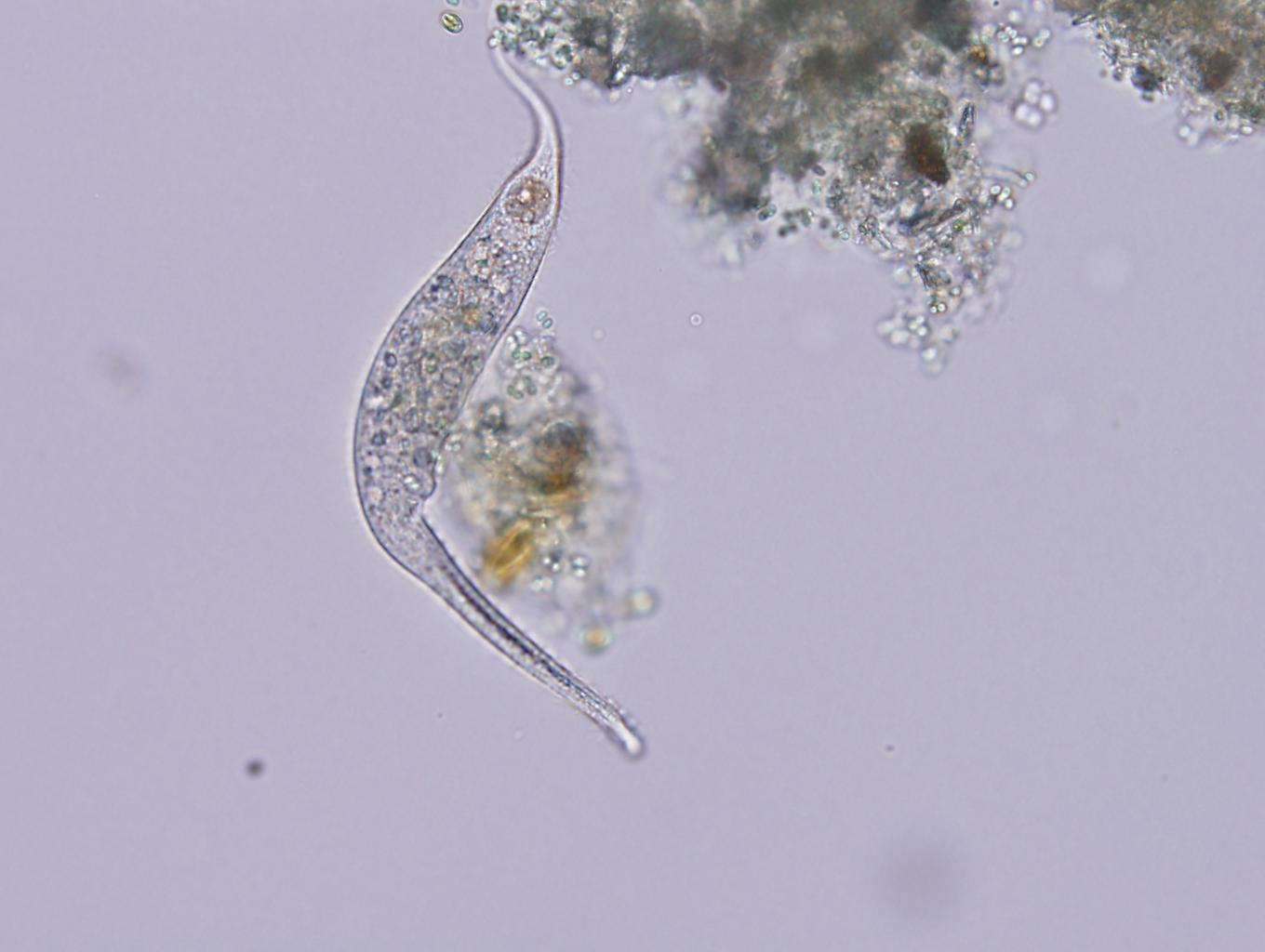
- Dileptus margaritifer

Scientific classification
- Domain: Eukaryota
- Clade: Diaphoretickes
- Clade: Sar
- Clade: Alveolata
- Phylum: Ciliophora
- Class: Litostomatea
- Order: Dileptida
- Family: Dileptidae
- Genus: Dileptus
- Species: D. margaritifer

Binomial name
- Dileptus margaritifer (Ehrenberg, 1834) Dujardin, 1841

= Dileptus margaritifer =

Species of single-celled organism

Dileptus margaritifer is a species of ciliates in the family Dileptidae. It is common in freshwater streams, lakes and ponds, as well as mosses and soil. The species has been found on every continent except Antarctica.

Because of a taxonomic error by one researcher in the 19th century, specimens of Dileptus margaritifer have been misidentified in most studies as Dileptus anser (Müller, 1773).

== Morphology ==
Dileptus margaritifer has a slender body, usually about 450 μm in length and very flexible, narrowing at the posterior into a small, sharp tail. At its front, it has a broad and tapering proboscis, reminiscent of an elephant's trunk in its shape and flexibility, but with a flattened rather than round cross-section. The proboscis is 1/3 to 1/2 of the total body length. The cellular mouth (cytostome) sits at the base of the proboscis within a protuberance called the "oral bulge." The cell has a row of 4-20 contractile vacuoles along the dorsal surface, and at least 200 macronuclei scattered in the cytoplasm, with several spherical micronuclei distributed among them.

== Feeding habits ==
Dileptus margaritifer feeds upon other unicellular organisms, using toxic extrusomes embedded in its proboscis to strike and stun its prey. The tip of the proboscis sometimes adheres to other objects, and can become detached. Most of the proboscis may be lost in this way during a feeding period, but is quickly regenerated. Captured prey is ingested through an oral aperture (cytostome) at the base of the proboscis. In one study, it was found that Dileptus margaritifer fed almost exclusively in the early morning, between 4am and 9am.

== Reproduction ==
Like most ciliates, Dileptus margaritifer reproduces asexually, by transverse division of the cell (fission). Division may be preceded by conjugation, a sexual phenomenon in which two ciliates of compatible mating types exchange genetic material by reciprocal transfer of haploid gametes, derived by meiosis from each cell's micronuclei. The species is known to have three distinct mating types (sexes), conventionally designated I, II, and III. Individuals may cycle through several mating types in the course of their lives. However the final and (usually) stable type is genetically determined by a single genetic locus mat with three alleles, one for each type, with type I being dominant over type II, and II over III.

== History and classification ==
Dileptus margaritifer has had a confusing nomenclatural history. The species was originally described by C. G. Ehrenberg, under the name Amphileptus margaritifer. Eight years later, Félix Dujardin created the new genus Dileptus and placed A. margaritifer within it. In the same work, he misidentified a specimen of Dileptus margaritifer, and published a description and illustration of it under the name Dileptus anser. The error was repeated by later taxonomists, including the influential Alfred Kahl. As a result, Dileptus margaritifer has been widely cultured and studied under the name Dileptus anser.
