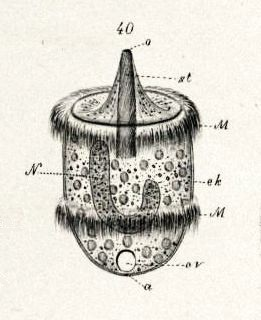
- Illustration of Didinium nasutum

Scientific classification
- Domain: Eukaryota
- Supergroup: Alveolata
- Phylum: Ciliophora
- Class: Litostomatea
- Order: Haptorida
- Family: Didiniidae; Poche, 1913

Genera
- Didinium; Monodinium; Cyclotrichium

= Didiniidae =

Family of ciliates

Didiniidae is a family of ciliates containing three genera, Didinium being the first one formally described.
