= Lacrymaria =

In biology, Lacrymaria is the name of two distinct genera:

- Lacrymaria (fungus), a genus of mushrooms in the family Psathyrellaceae
- Lacrymaria (ciliate), a genus of unicellular protists
