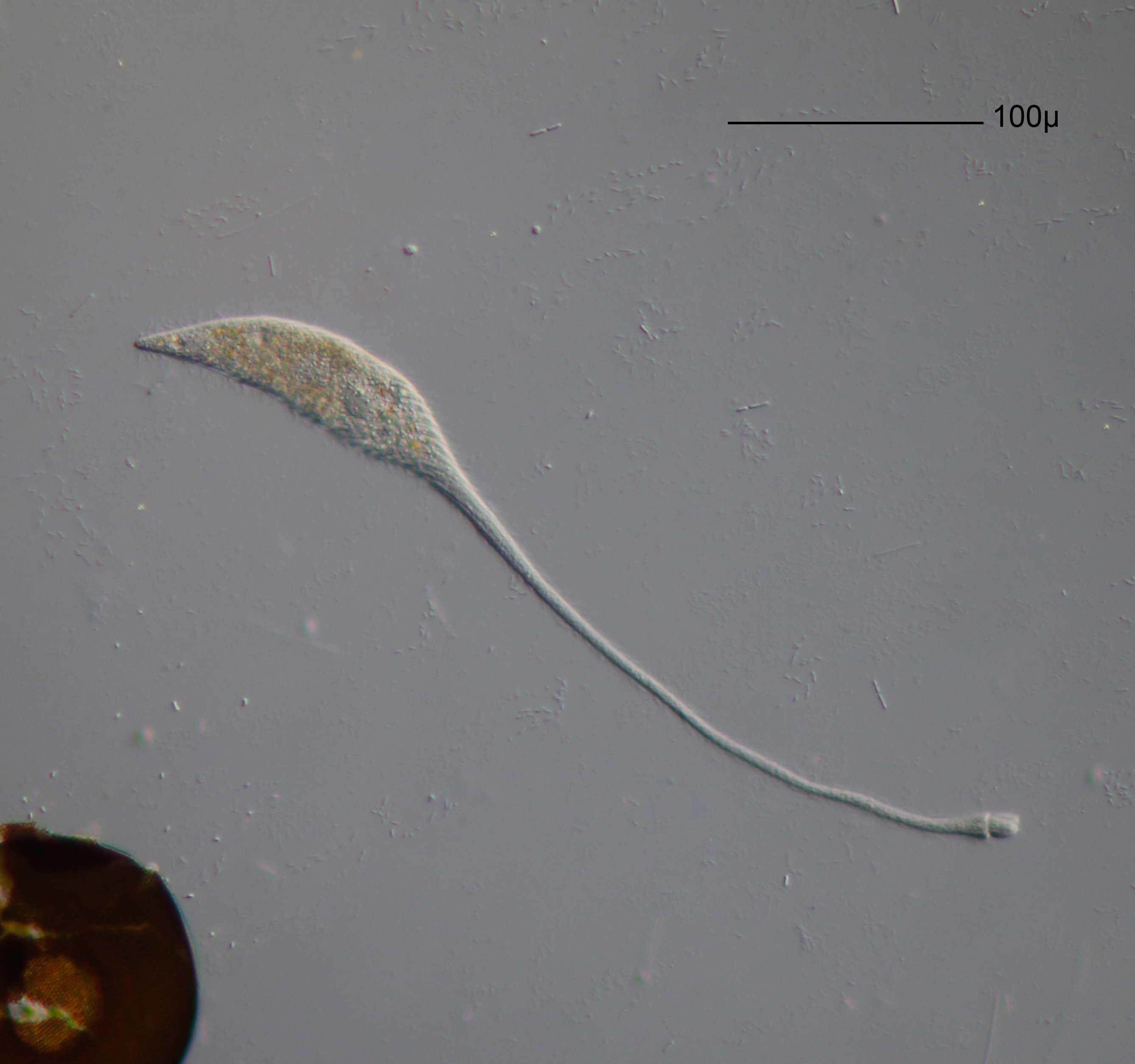
- Lacrymaria olor

Scientific classification
- Domain: Eukaryota
- Clade: Sar
- Superphylum: Alveolata
- Phylum: Ciliophora
- Class: Litostomatea
- Order: Haptorida
- Family: Lacrymariidae
- Genus: Lacrymaria; Bory de St. Vincent, 1824

Species
- See text

= Lacrymaria (ciliate) =

Genus of single-celled organisms

Lacrymaria is a genus of ciliates. Its best known species is the "Tear of Swan", Lacrymaria olor.

== Species ==
The genus includes the following species:

- Lacrymaria aciformis Kahl, 1933
- Lacrymaria acuta Kahl, 1933
- Lacrymaria aquae dulcis (Roux, 1901) Lauterborn, 1915 see Lacrymaria pupula
- Lacrymaria balechi Dragesco
- Lacrymaria caspia Grimm, 1876 see Lacrymaria coronata, Claparede and Lachmann, 1858
- Lacrymaria caudata Kahl, 1932/1933; var. lemani Dragesco, 1960
- Lacrymaria cohni Kent, 1881
- Lacrymaria conifera Burkovsky, 1970
- Lacrymaria coniformis Burger, 1908
- Lacrymaria coronata Claparede and Lachmann, 1858/1859 (= Phialina coronata)
- Lacrymaria coronata var. aquae dulcis Roux, 1901 see Lacrymaria pupula
- Lacrymaria cucumis Penard, 1922 see Lagynus cucumis
- Lacrymaria cupifera Kahl, 1933
- Lacrymaria delamarei Dragesco
- Lacrymaria elegans Engelmann, 1862 see Lagynus elegans, Quennersted, 1867
- Lacrymaria elliptica Burger, 1908 see Lacrymaria pupula
- Lacrymaria filiformis Maskell
- Lacrymaria kahli Dragesco
- Lacrymaria lagenula Claparede and Lachmann, 1858
- Lacrymaria marina Kahl, 1933
- Lacrymaria marinum Kahl, 1933
- Lacrymaria metabolica Burger, 1908 see Lacrymaria vermicularis , O. F. Muller-Ehrenberg, 1831
- Lacrymaria minima Kahl, 1927
- Lacrymaria olor O. F. Muller, 1776/1786, Bory de Saint-Vincent, 1824; var. marina Kahl, 1933
- Lacrymaria proteus Ehrenberg, 1830 see Lacrymaria olor
- Lacrymaria phialina Svec, 1897 see Lacrymaria vermicularis, Muller-Erhenberg, 1831
- Lacrymaria phialina Svec, 1907, Penard, 1922 see Lacrymaria pupula
- Lacrymaria pulchra Wenzel, 1953
- Lacrymaria pumilio Vuxanovici
- Lacrymaria pupula O. F. Muller, 1786
- Lacrymaria pusilla Claparede and Lachmann
- Lacrymaria rostrata
- Lacrymaria rotundata Dragesco
- Lacrymaria salinarum Kahl, 1928
- Lacrymaria sapropelica Kahl, 1927
- Lacrymaria spiralis Kahl, 1926 see Lacrymaria vermicularis O. F. Muller-Ehrenberg, 1831
- Lacrymaria striata Gulati, 1926 see Lacrymaria pupula
- Lacrymaria trichocystus Dragesco
- Lacrymaria truncatum Stokes, 1885 see Spathidium truncatum
- Lacrymaria urnula Kahl, 1930
- Lacrymaria vermicularis O. F. Muller, 1786, O. F. Muller-Ehrenberg, 1831
- Lacrymaria versatilis Quennerstedt, 1867
- Lacrymaria vertens Stokes, 1885
