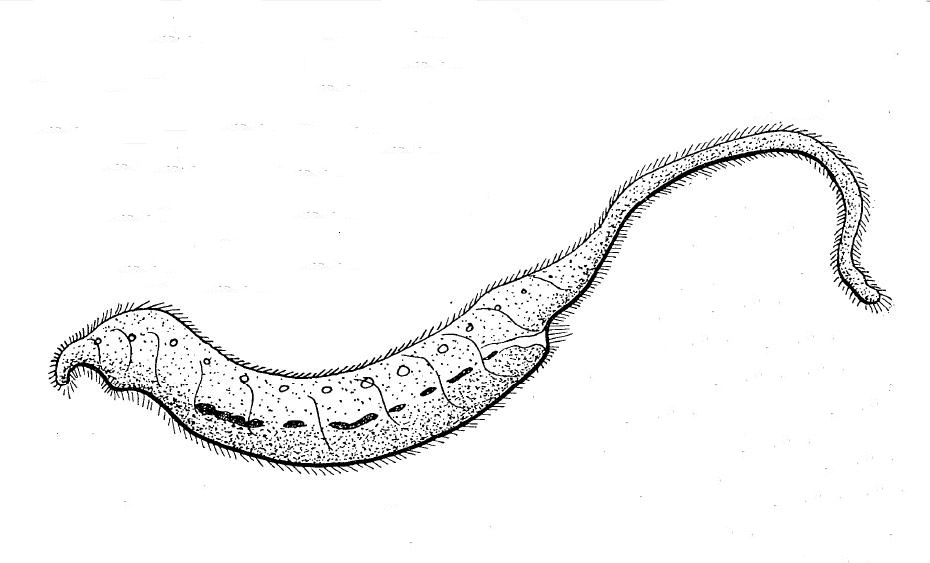

Scientific classification
- Domain: Eukaryota
- Clade: Sar
- Superphylum: Alveolata
- Phylum: Ciliophora
- Class: Litostomatea
- Order: Dileptida
- Family: Dileptidae
- Genus: Pseudomonilicaryon
- Species: P. anser

Binomial name
- Pseudomonilicaryon anser (Müller, 1773) Vďačný & Foissner, 2011

= Pseudomonilicaryon anser =

Species of single-celled organism

Pseudomonilicaryon anser is a species of unicellular ciliates in the family Dileptidae, also known under the names Dileptus anser and Dileptus cygnus. The species is common in fresh water ponds, stagnant pools, mosses and soils.

For nearly a century and a half, the species was classified in the genus Dileptus. In 2012, following a comprehensive review of the dileptid group, it was moved to the genus Pseudomonilicaryon, which is distinguished from Dileptus by the shape of its macronucleus. The macronucleus of Pseudomonilicaryon is arranged like a string of beads, whereas that of Dileptus is composed of small nodules scattered throughout the cytoplasm of the cell.

== History and classification ==
Pseudomonilicaryon anser has had a long and confusing history, complicated by a series of name changes and misidentifications. The species was first described and illustrated by Otto Müller in 1773, under the name Vibrio anser, and redescribed by Ehrenberg in 1838, as Amphileptus anser. In 1841, Félix Dujardin moved the species to the new genus Dileptus. However, Dujardin's Dileptus anser was actually a misidentified specimen of Dileptus margaritifer (Ehrenberg, 1834), a dileptid of similar size with a shorter proboscis and scattered macronucleus. In 1931, Alfred Kahl entrenched the error by treating D. margaritifer as a synonym of D. anser.

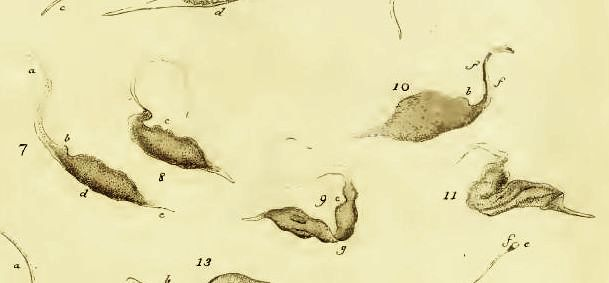
Vibrio anser from Animalcula Infusoria, 1786, by Otto Müller.

The identity of Dileptus anser is also entangled with that of another long-necked dileptid, the nominal species Dileptus cygnus (Clap. & Lach., 1859). Kahl describes and illustrates Pseudomonilicaryon anser under this name, and most studies of the organism have used this nomenclature. In 1984, Dileptus cygnus was formally identified as a junior synonym of Vibrio anser (Müller, 1773).

In 2012, Peter Vďačný and Wilhelm Foissner transferred Dileptus anser to the genus Pseudomonilicaryon Foissner, 1997.

== Morphology ==
Pseudomonilicaryon anser is about .5 mm long, with a narrow, flattened body tapering at the posterior into a distinct tail. At the front end, is a long, extremely mobile proboscis, making up about 55% of the cell's entire length. The oral aperture (cytostome) sits at the base of this proboscis, within a visible swelling called the "oral bulge." The macronucleus is composed of 7 to 25 nodules, like a string of beads. Along the dorsal surface is a row of 15-20 contractile vacuoles.

== Habitat and feeding ==
Pseudomonilicaryon anser is found in mud and soft sediments at the bottoms of stagnant ponds and puddles. A rapacious predator, described by one writer as "surely the king of beasts of the Protozoa," it feeds exclusively on other microscopic organisms. P. anser hunts by clinging to the substrate and waving its long proboscis in a counter-clockwise direction. When the proboscis makes contact with its prey, toxic extrusomes are released, disabling the smaller organism, which is then gathered into the dileptid's cytostome. Smaller prey are swept into the mouth by the movement of cilia, while large organisms are pushed toward the oral bulge by "the writhings of the proboscis."
