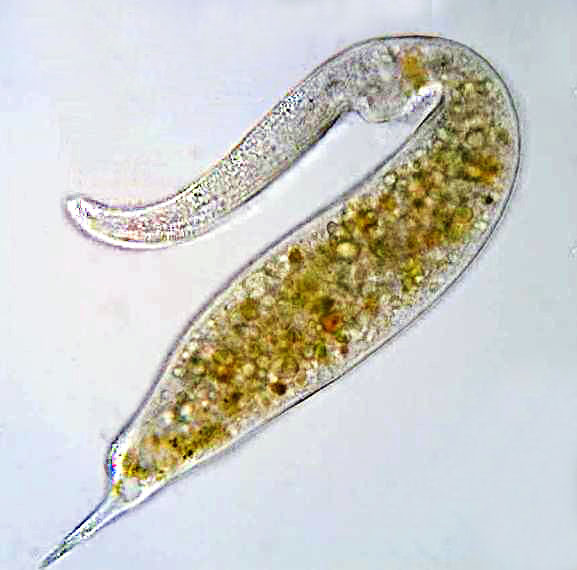
- Dileptus sp.

Scientific classification
- Domain: Eukaryota
- Supergroup: Alveolata
- Phylum: Ciliophora
- Class: Litostomatea
- Order: Dileptida
- Family: Dileptidae
- Genus: Dileptus; Dujardin, 1841

= Dileptus =

Genus of single-celled organisms

Dileptus is a genus of unicellular ciliates in the class Litostomatea. Species of Dileptus occur in fresh and salt water, as well as mosses and soils. Most are aggressive predators equipped with long, mobile proboscides lined with toxic extrusomes, with which they stun smaller organisms before consuming them. Thirteen species and subspecies of Dileptus are recognized.

Dileptus species have served as model organisms used in the study of ciliary patterns, ontogenesis, conjugation and food acquisition.

== Appearance and characteristics ==
Dileptus bodies are typically narrow or cylindrical, and have a macronucleus made up of more than a hundred scattered nodules. During cell division, these nodules divide individually. At the front end of the cell is a mobile proboscis. The cytostome is at the base of this organ and is well fortified with stiff microtubular rods (nematodesmata). The surface of the cell is uniformly covered with cilia arranged in longitudinal rows. The body may taper at the back end, forming something like a tail. Multiple contractile vacuoles lie in a row along the dorsal surface. Most Dileptus are colourless, but two nominal species carry symbiotic green algae in their cytoplasm.

== History and classification ==
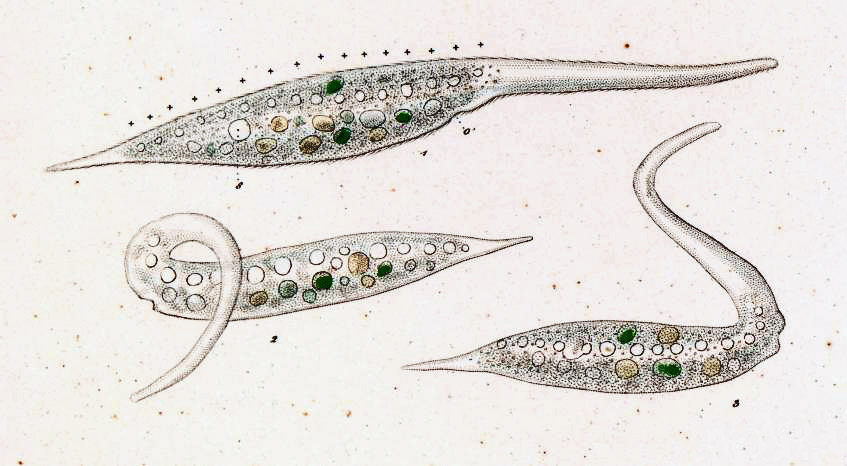
Amphileptus margaritifer (=Dileptus margaritifer) by C. G. Ehrenberg, 1838.

A species of Dileptus was described by C. G. Ehrenberg in 1833, under the name Amphileptus margaritifer. Eight years later, Félix Dujardin created the genus Dileptus and moved Ehrenberg's A. margaritifer to it, along with Dileptus anser Müller 1773 (now classified in Pseudomonilicaryon) and Dileptus folium (now Litonotus cygnus). Over the next century, many new species were described. By 1963, when Jean Dragesco published the first detailed account of the genus, it included about 50 species.

In a comprehensive taxonomic study published in 2012, Peter Vďačný and Wilhelm Foissner restricted the genus Dileptus to dileptids "having more than 50 dispersed macronuclear nodules that divide individually," which left only ten nominal species within the group. Many traditionally recognized members of Dileptus, including the well-known species Dileptus anser, have been moved to other genera, such as Pseudomonilicaryon and Rimaleptus.

== Species of Dileptus ==
- Dileptus anatinus Golińska, 1971
- Dileptus beersi Jones, 1956
- Dileptus costaricanus Foissner, 1995
- Dileptus dubius Vuxanovici, 1959
- Dileptus estuarinus Dragesco, 1960
- Dileptus jonesi Dragesco, 1963
- Dileptus margaritifer (Ehrenberg, 1833)
- Dileptus multinucleatus Vuxanovici, 1959
- Dileptus sphagnicola Vdacny & Foissner, 2011
- Dileptus viridis (Ehrenberg, 1833) Foissner, 1987

== Video Gallery ==
Dileptus sp.

Dileptus sp.
