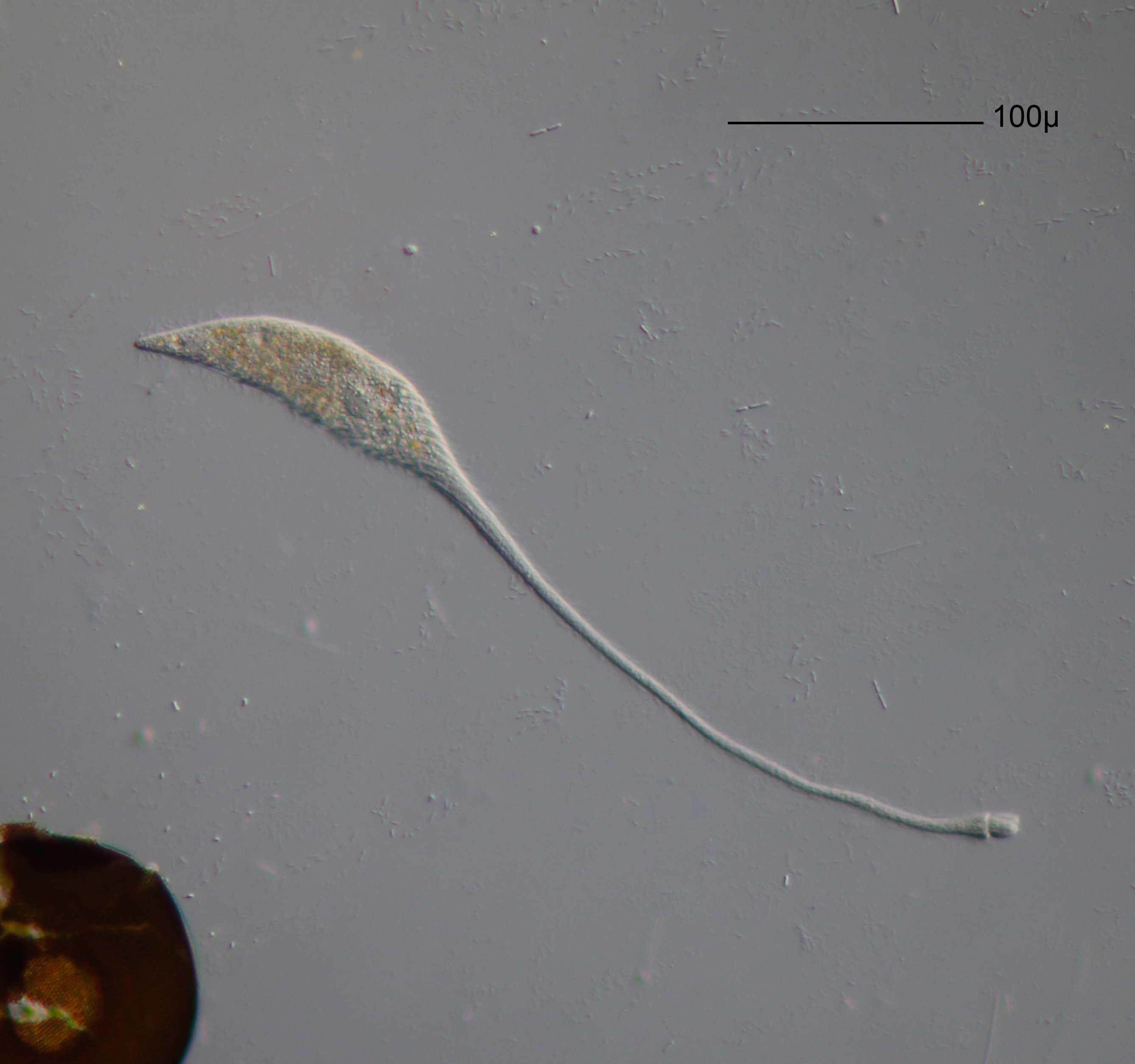
- Lacrymaria olor at 160x magnification

Scientific classification
- Domain: Eukaryota
- Supergroup: Alveolata
- Phylum: Ciliophora
- Class: Litostomatea
- Order: Haptorida
- Family: Lacrymariidae
- Genus: Lacrymaria
- Species: L. olor

Binomial name
- Lacrymaria olor (O. F. Müller, 1786)

Synonyms
- Vibrio olor O. F. Müller, 1786

= Lacrymaria olor =

Species of single-celled organism

Lacrymaria olor is a species of ciliate, typically 100 micrometres (0.10 mm) long, that is found in freshwater ponds. Its name means "swan tear" in Latin, and refers to its general shape: namely, a teardrop-shaped cell with a small "head" at the end of a long slender "neck". The classification has been attributed to Müller (1786).

The protist is notable for its ability to extend its "neck" by up to thirty times the length of its body (about 1.2 mm), and manipulate in many directions very rapidly — even around obstacles — in order to capture its food. Such extension is not in and of itself unique, but the organism's ability to do the extension quickly and repeatedly sets it apart from others. The molecular mechanism underlying L. olor's "cellular origami" appears to be a helical array of microtubules, presently unique among organisms, uncovered in 2024.

The protist usually has two macronuclei and a single micronucleus. Its entire cell body is covered with cilia arranged in spirals. It has two contractile vacuoles, one at each end of the body. It contains small birefringent crystals.

Lacrymaria olor can be easily reproduced in vitro, but cultivated populations are difficult to maintain for long. It can reproduce sexually, with each individual assuming either of two mating types ("sexes") at various times of the day. It can also reproduce asexually, possibly after an internal rearrangement of its genome; but there is evidence that this mechanism stops working after a certain number of consecutive asexual generations. It can also regenerate a new head within minutes, if the original is cut off.

Lacrymaria feed primarily on smaller organisms such as other ciliates, flagellates, and amoeba, but may sometimes tear chunks out of larger ciliates. They display a type of "cellular sentience" in that they actively hunt other microbes.

== Gallery ==
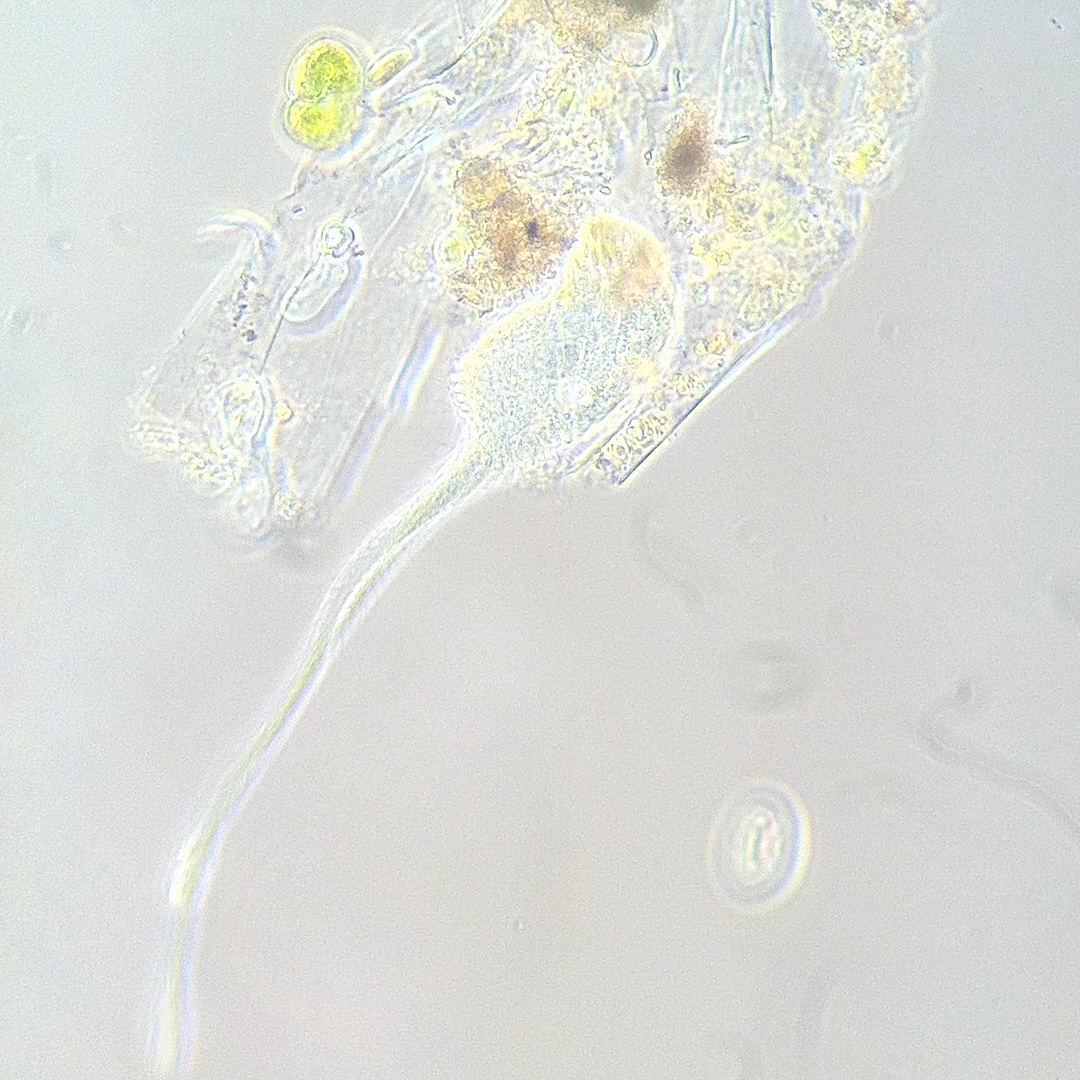

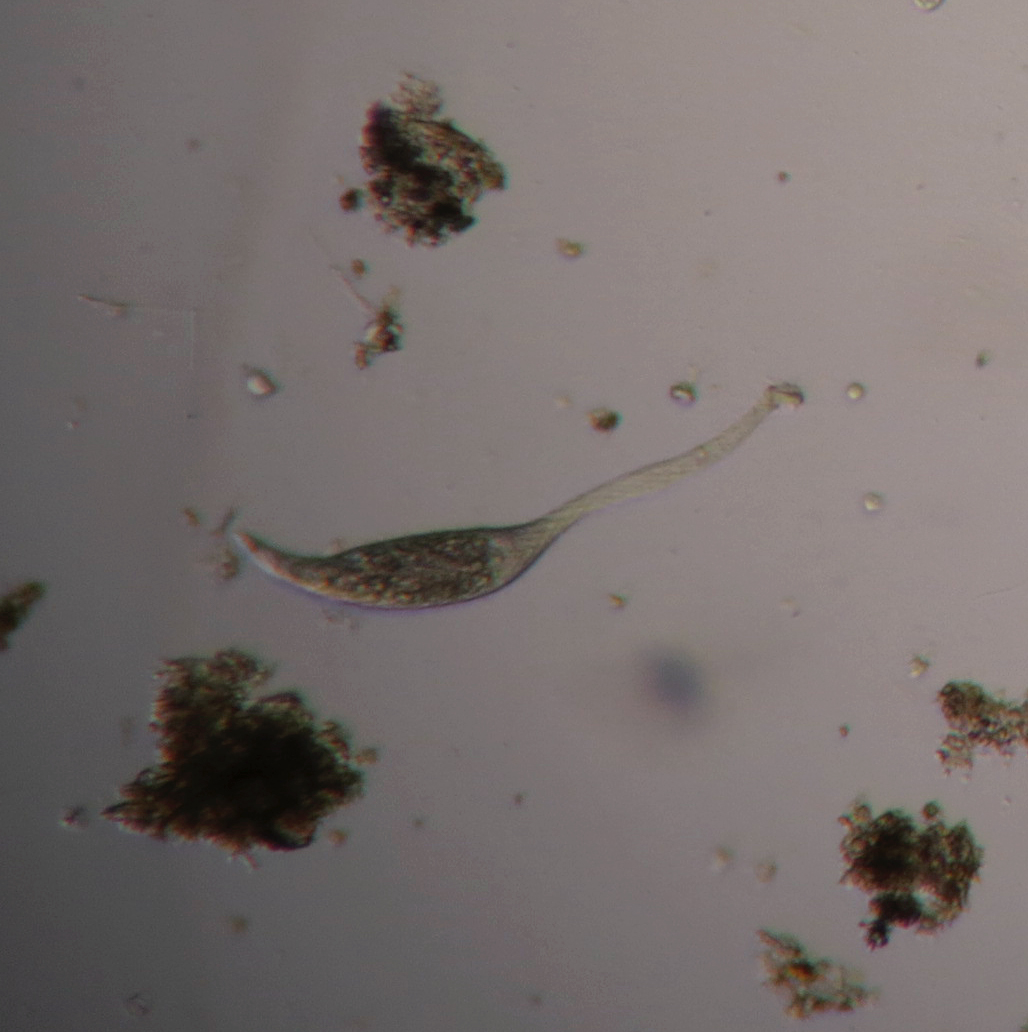
Lacrymaria olor

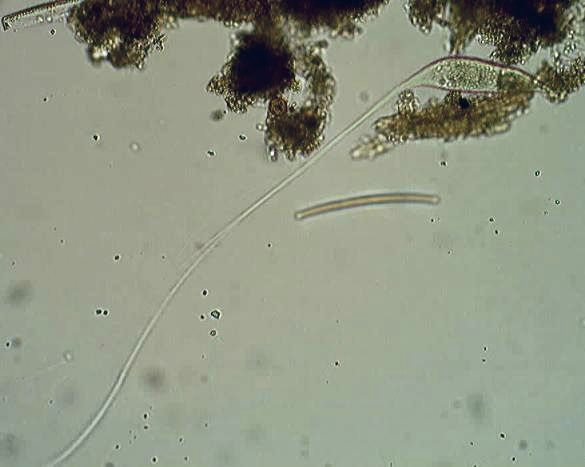
Lacrymaria olor

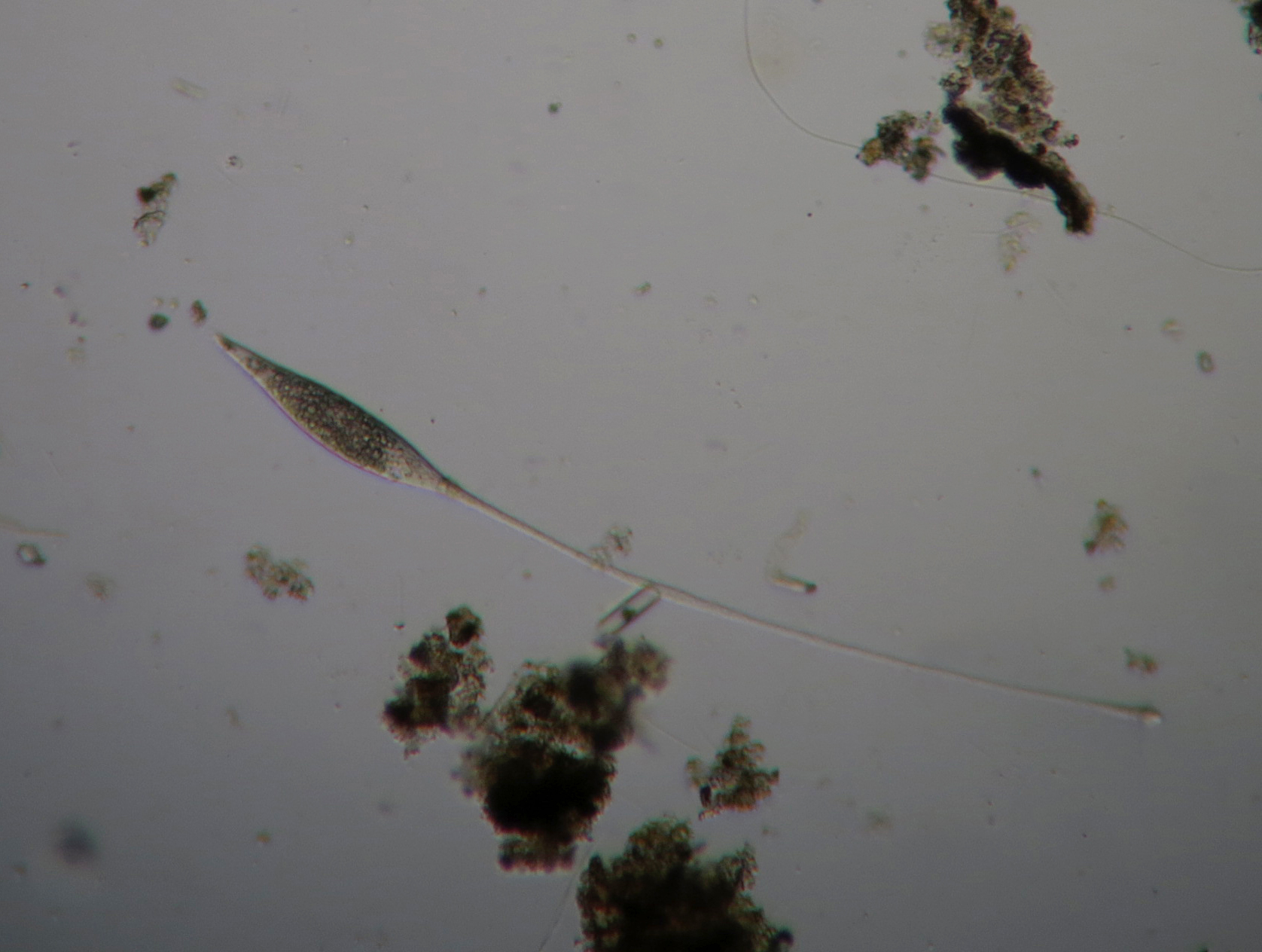
Lacrymaria olor

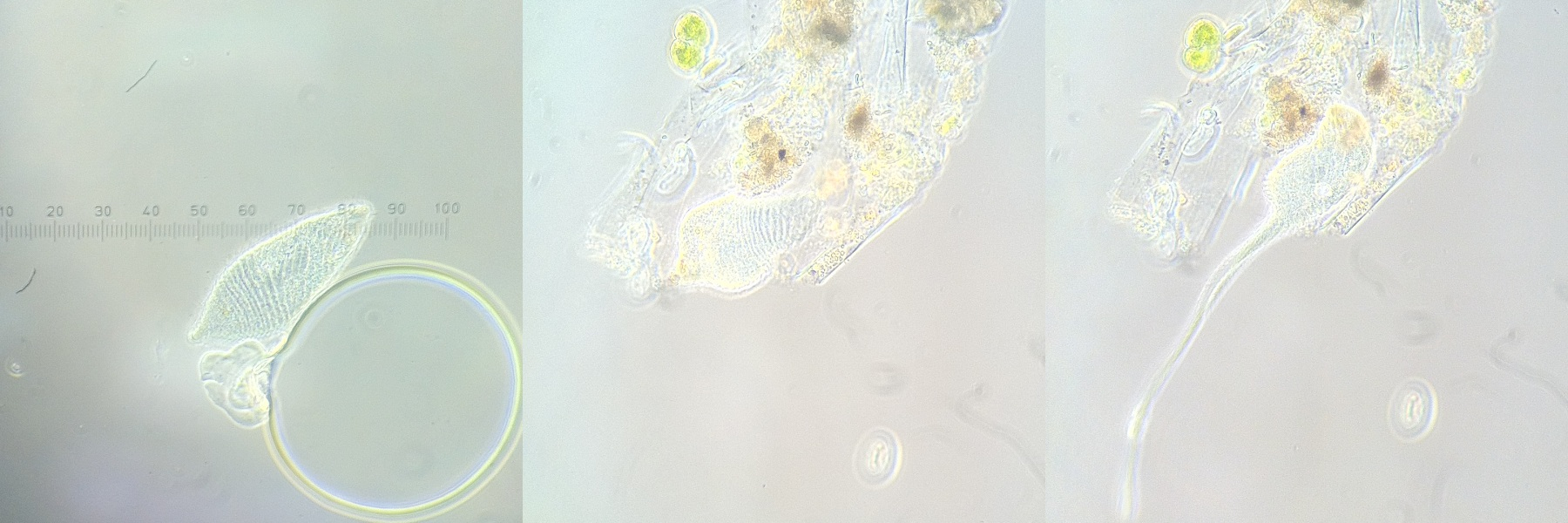
Lacrymaria olor. Left: isolated cell; middle: burrowing in debris with proboscis retracted; right: proboscis extended
