= Emmanuel Fauré-Fremiet =

French biologist (1883–1971)

- Born: 29 November 1883; Paris
- Died: 6 November 1971 (aged 87); Paris
- Awards: Fellow of the Royal Society
- Scientific career
- Institutions: Collège de France; University of Paris

Emmanuel Fauré-Fremiet, ForMemRS, (1883–1971) was a French biologist.

== Early life ==
Fauré-Fremiet was born on 29 December 1883 to the composer Gabriel Fauré and Marie Fremiet, the daughter of the sculptor Emmanuel Frémiet. As a child he had poor health and was privately tutored at home. He was appointed an assistant lecturer in the Museum d'histoire naturelle in 1910, and then lecturer in Comparative embryology at the Collège de France in 1911, working under Louis-Félix Henneguy.

== Career ==
Fauré-Fremiet was a professor at the Sorbonne, and succeeded Henneguy as chair of comparative embryology at the Collège de France from 1928 to 1954. He published extensively on protozoology, especially the ciliates, on embryology, and experimental cell biology. At the Institut de Biologie Physicochimique (the Rothschild Institute), he developed diffraction X-Ray, and electron microscopy with Boris Ephrussi. He described the unusual cilliate genus Legendrea.

== Personal life ==
In March 1913, Fauré-Fremiet married Jeanne, daughter of Louis-Félix Henneguy. The couple had no children, and for many years, her sister Suzanne lived with them. Jeanne died in 1967, and Suzanne in 1970. He later married his former assistant M. Hamard in 1971. Fauré-Fremiet died from bronchitis and emphysema on 6 November 1971.

== Honours ==
Honours and awards received by Fauré-Fremiet included:

- Chevalier de Legion d'Honneur (1936)
- President of the International Society of Cytologists
- President of the Société zoologique de France (1941)
- Honorary foreign member of the American Academy of Arts and Sciences (1938)
- Foreign Member of the Royal Society (1963)
