= Rouelbeau Castle =

Ruined castle in Meinierm Geneva in Switzerland

Rouelebeau Castle
- Château de Rouelebeau
- Meinier in Switzerland
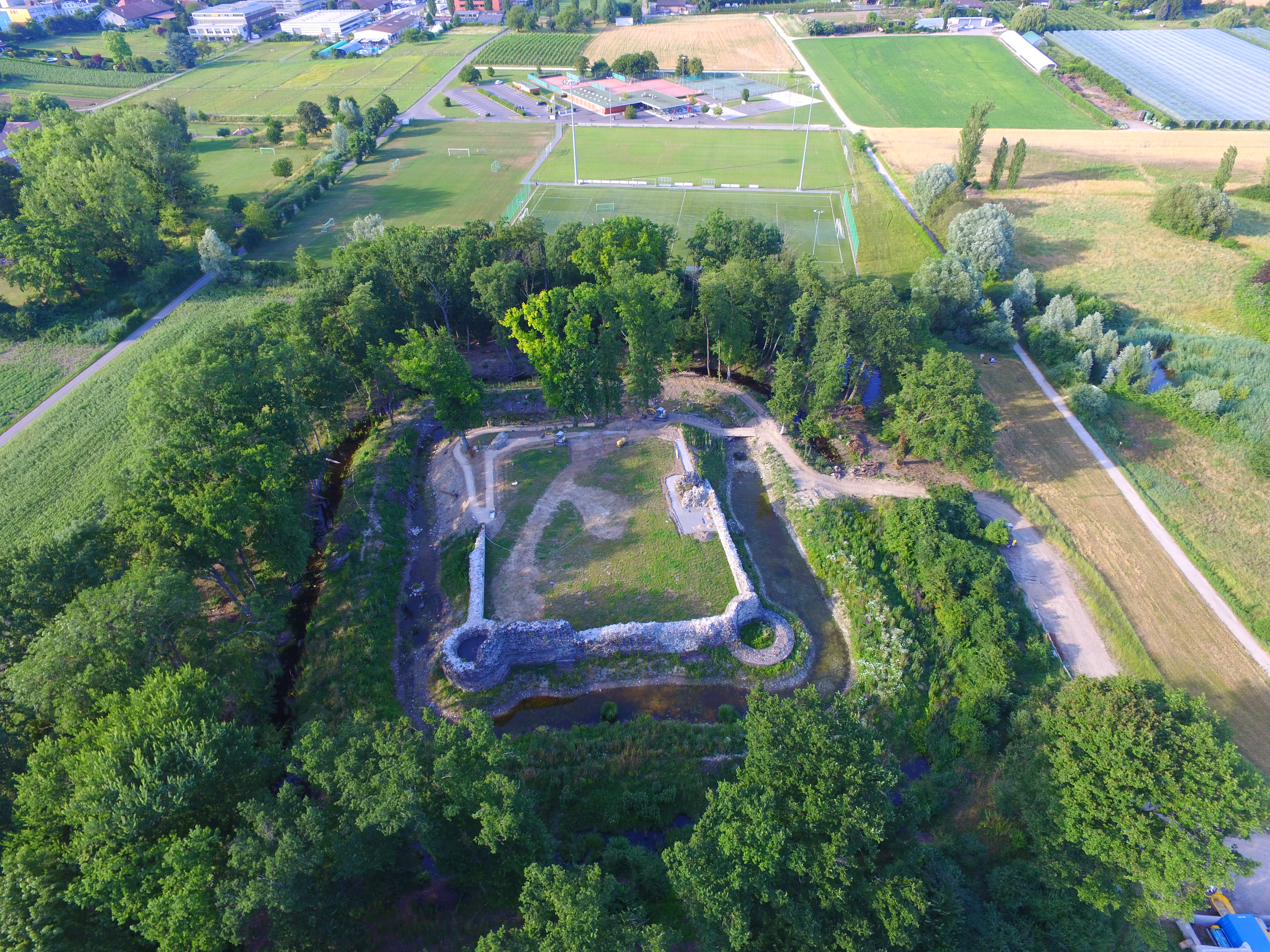
- Rouelbeau Castle, aerial view

Site information
- Type: lowland castle
- Owner: Public
- Open to the public: Yes
- Condition: Ruined
- Website: http://www.batie-rouelbeau.ch

Location
- Coordinates: 46.24205°N 6.21775°E

Site history
- Built: 1318
- In use: 14th century

Rouelbeau Castle is a ruined lowland fortress in the municipality of Meinier and the only comprehensively visible remnant of a medieval castle in the Canton of Geneva in Switzerland. It is a heritage site of national significance.

== Name ==
The site has been known under a variety of names, including Bâtie Compey, Bâtie Cholay, Sonneyro or Sonnoyre, and Soubeyron or Souveyron. The latter ones have been traced by some to the term sous-Voirons ("under-will-see"), but other have doubted that logic. The first mention of the name Roillebot - later transcribed as Rouelbeau - has been dated to 1536:

The name which has been used in modern times is said to be a combination of the French verb roiller and the noun Bot from the old local dialect. The former can be translated with "to rain heavily" and, more specifically, in the old dialect with "to beat" or "to hit". The latter means "frog". One explanation for the meaning of Rouelbeau is hence that the lords of the castle had difficulties to sleep at nights because of the loud noise from the croaking frogs and therefore had their servants beat on the water with sticks.

== Description ==
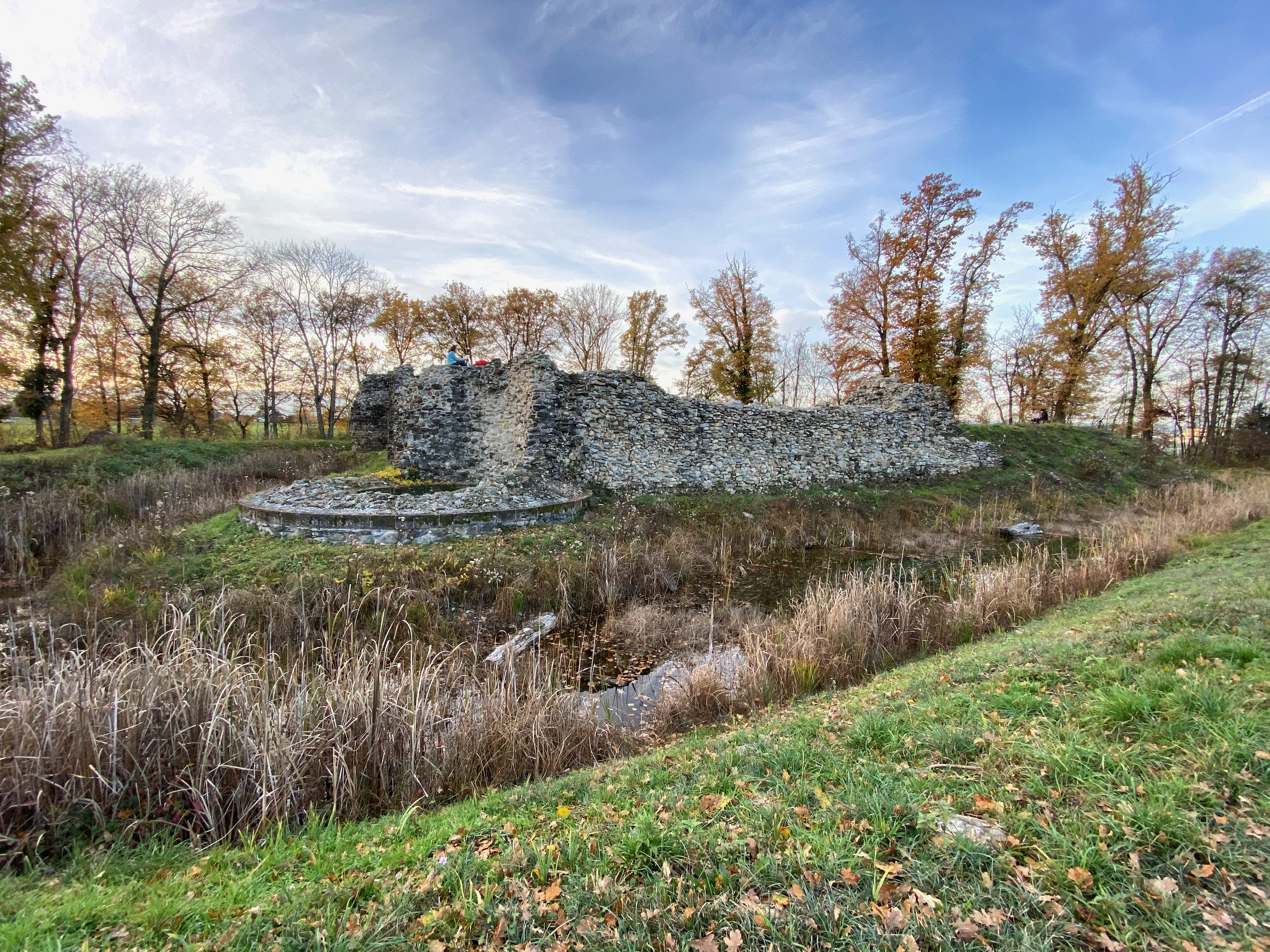
Ruins of the castle's south-eastern tower, eastern wall and moat.

The ruins are situated in a marshland close to the sources of the Seymaz river.

The layout shows that Rouelbeau was a rectangular castle, 52 m (171 ft) in length and 39 m (128 ft) in width. Its four corners were formed by circular towers with a diameter of 9 m (30 ft), whose walls were 2.3 m (7.5 ft) thick. At the entrance stood a rectangular tower. It was surrounded by a moat, which is still visible and partly filled with water today.

== History ==
=== Ancient times ===
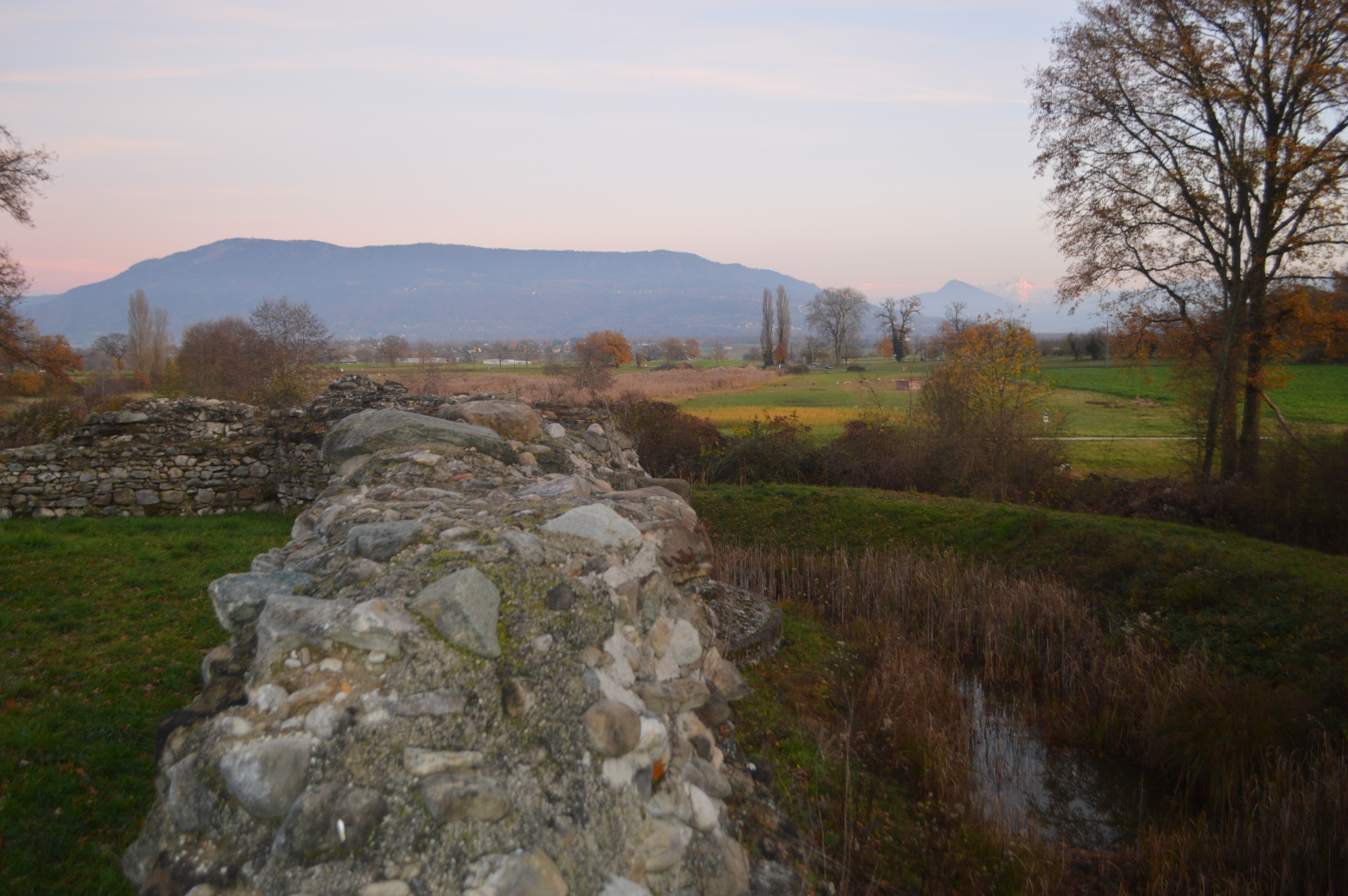
View towards Upper Savoy, the Mont Blanc in the background on the right

Scattered archaeological finds in the (former) marshes give evidence that there were already settlements during the Roman times some two millennia ago, despite - or because of - the swampy conditions.

A picture, which the Swiss polymath Hans Conrad Escher von der Linth drew in 1785, says in its caption that the castle was built in the fifth century CE by Gundobad, King of the Burgundians. While there is no evidence for that claim, it may be an indication that the site continued to be settled during Late Antiquity and the Early Middle Ages.

The same goes for a thesis which was commonly accepted in the 19th century and claimed that Rouelbeau was Quadruvium, the royal residence of Gundobad's son Sigismund of Burgundy. That place was later located in Carouge.

=== Medieval times ===
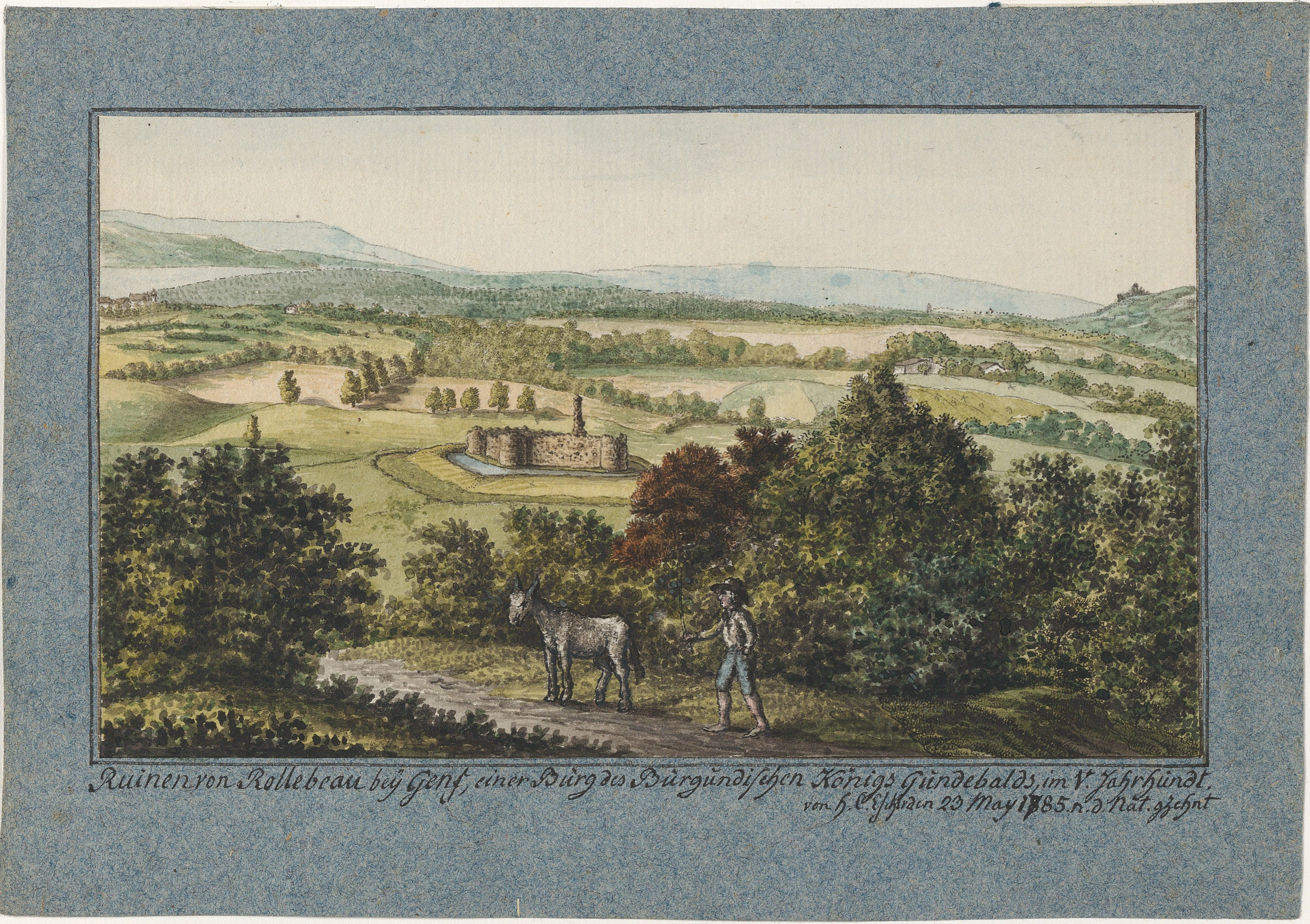
Escher's drawing from 1785

The fortress, whose ruins can be seen today, was founded at the beginning of the 14th century in the context of the decades-long power-struggle between the lords of Faucigny and the House of Savoy for the rule over Geneva's countryside. Its strategic location secured access to the newly founded settlement of Hermance on the southeastern shore of Lake Geneva to the house of Faucigny. It was their only outlet to Lake Geneva, as their lands were surrounded by the County of Geneva. Along with further fortresses in Hermance, Nernier and Allinges it formed a defense chain against the Savoyard ambitions.

Records from the Saint-Victor Priory indicate that the construction of the military installation, identified by later sources as a wooden fortified house, was completed on the castle's site on 7 July 1318 under the leadership of the knight Humbert de Choulex, who was a vassal of the Faucigny-Baron Hugues de La Tour et de Coligny, better known as Hugues Dauphin. Already in the following year, the Baron purchased the site from the knight of Choulex.

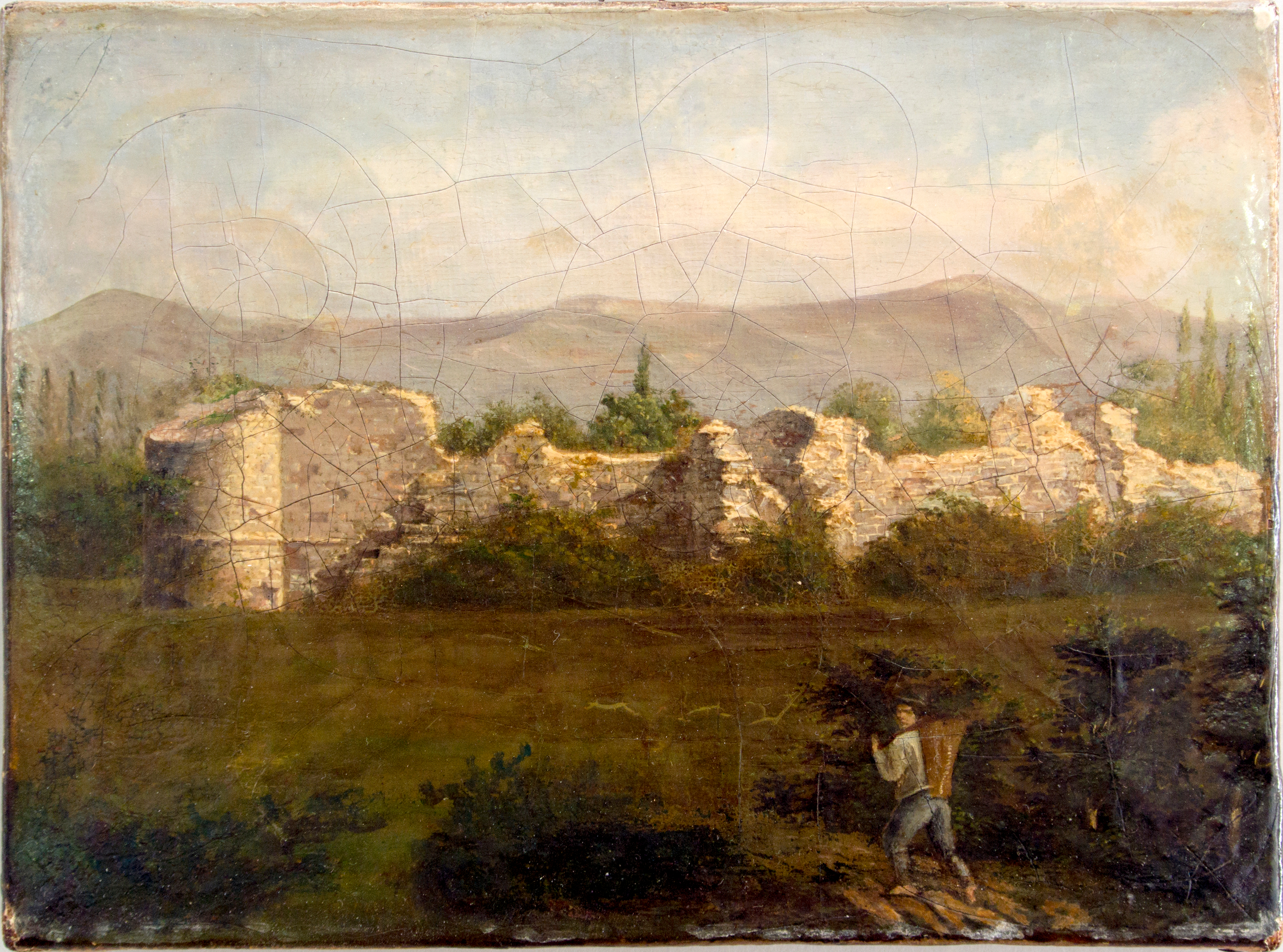
Oil painting by an unknown artist, probably from 1808 (private collection)

The garrison was apparently manned by two to three infantrymen during peace times and by about ten foot soldiers and six cavalrymen during war times. A paved path connected it with the surrounding hamlets. Already three years after its inauguration the castle had to fend off an attack by Amadeus V, Count of Savoy, surnamed the Great. After his death in 1323 more assaults by his successors Edward, surnamed the Liberal, and Aymon, nicknamed the Peaceful, followed. In 1334, the Baron of Faucigny entrusted Humbert de Choulex again with the command of the fortress. A detailed survey, which was prepared for the planned sale of some of the area of Dauphiné to the pope and has been kept in the Vatican Apostolic Archive ever since, mentions that in that year Rouelbeau was still made of wood. In 1339, the Baron of Faucigny handed it over to Hugues de Genève, Baron of Gex, and in the same year it was fortified by the piling up of an artificial hill, according to the afore-mentioned document. The fortress was then protected by a double-moat.

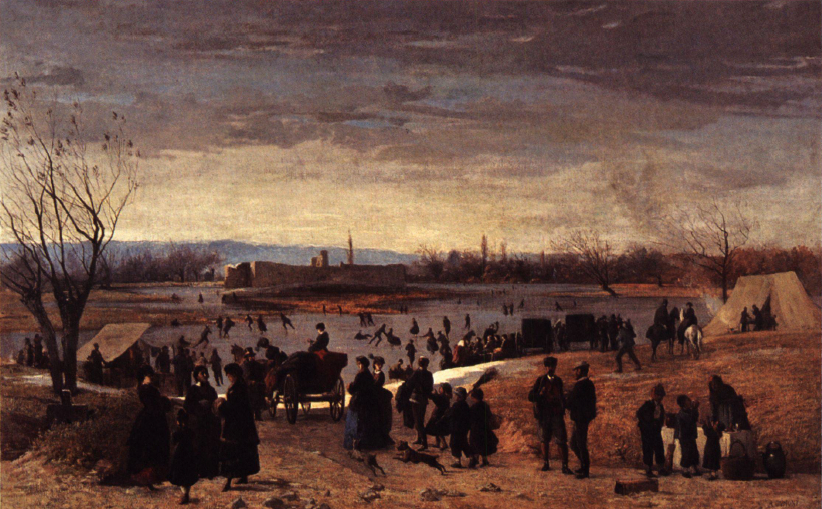
Ice skating around the ruins at the Pallanterie - oil painting by Geneva-artist Alfred Dumont from 1870 (private collection)

In 1341, the lords of Faucigny once again returned the fortress to Humbert de Choulex. The construction of the stonework structure whose ruins remain today took place in subsequent years, probably under the leadership of the knight Nicod de Ferney. He inherited the estate in 1345 from Humbert who did not have any children.

The stone walls did not hold for long against the invaders from Savoy. In 1355, the troops of Amadeus, nicknamed the Green Count, conquered Rouelbeau Castle and the area was integrated in the County of Savoy. Thus, the castle lost much of its strategic importance after just less than half a century and it was apparently turned into a prison.

The estate continued to be owned by the house of Ferney until 1420, when it became the property of the barons of Genève-Lullin through marriage. They apparently used it as a hunting lodge.

=== Modern times ===
Flyover of the castle

After the end of the medieval era the decay of the building just accelerated. When Geneva joined the Protestant Reformation in 1536 and declared itself an independent republic, its allies from Bern and Valais rallied their troops to support the Protestant separatists in their armed struggle against the Savoyard dominance. Rouelbeau suffered damages during combat in that context. Following the 1564 Treaty of Lausanne Meinier was jointly administered by the Republic of Geneva and the Dukes of Savoy for more than two centuries.

After the death of the last member of the house of Genève-Lullin in 1664 Rouelbeau was taken over by Claude-Alexandre de Fauchier, Baron de l'Etoile. His son sold it 19 years later to Jacques de Loys, the lord of Bonnevaux and owner of the nearby hamlet of Merlinge. However, the buildings kept on crumbling down for the next century. In 1793, another aristocrat, François Carron, inherited the ruins, but was expropriated after the French invasion of 1798. The state subsequently leased the estate to a number of individuals.

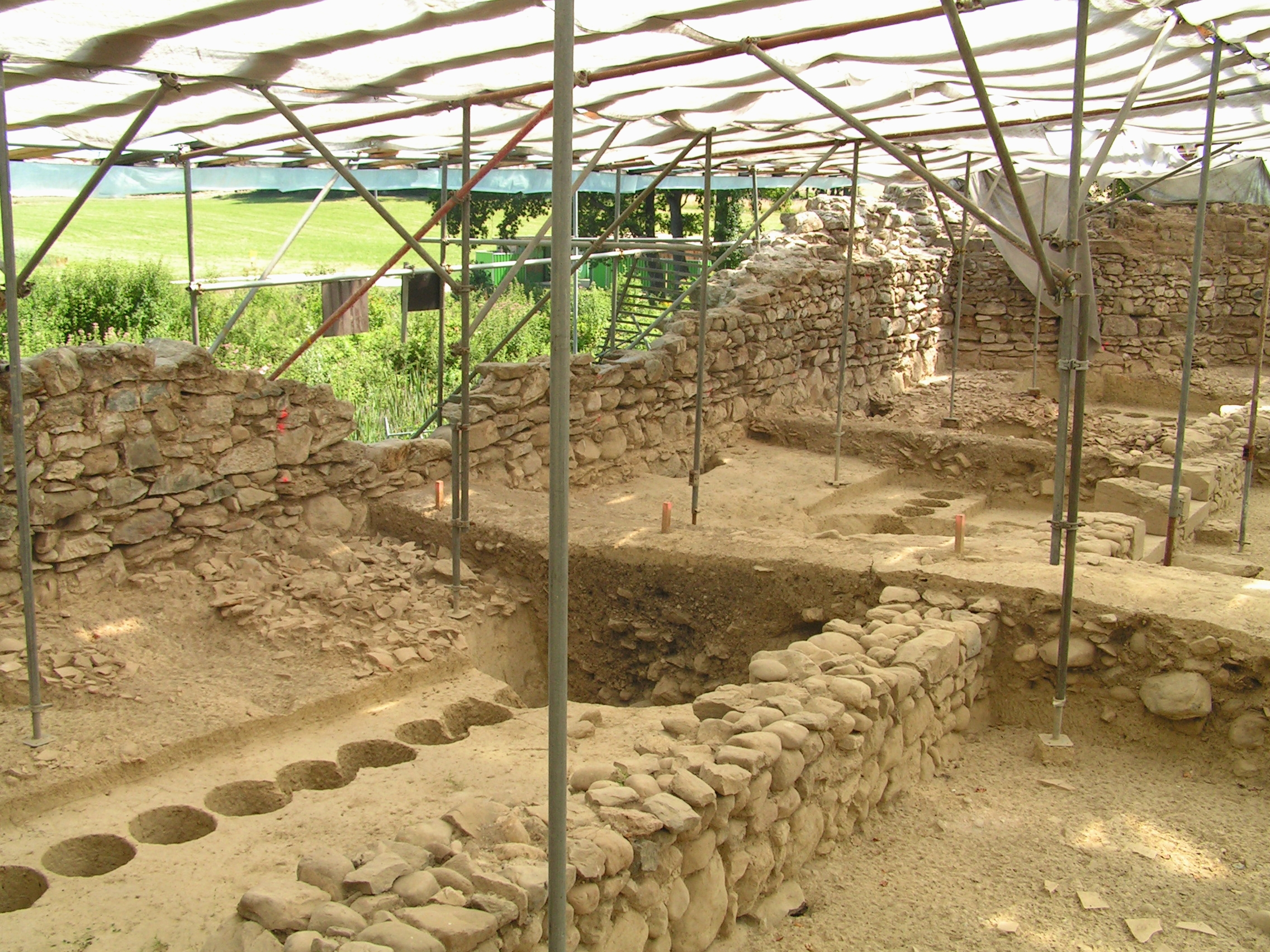
The excavations in 2011 with remnants of the palisades

The site basically served as a quarry during the course of the 19th century. Contemporary illustrations show that it also became a popular destination for the urban population of Geneva on day vacations. From 1915 onwards the marshes of Rouelbeau were systematically drained by channeling the Seymaz in order to counter the rural depopulation in the area. In 1921, the ruins were inscribed into the very first cantonal registry of historical monuments as the last traces of a medieval castle in the canton altogether. However, they remained basically unprotected from the forces of nature and were overgrown by trees during the course of the 20th century.

The renaissance of Rouelbeau started in 2000 with the land restoration of the Seymaz marsh. The project triggered archaeological excavations and preservation measures by the Cantonal Archaeological Services, which discovered evidence of the wooden construction underneath the stone walls as well as a papal bull by Innocent IV. The works started in 2001 and lasted for twelve years. Based on 3D-photography of the area, a miniature model of the ruins was made from bronze, which in addition to numerous info plates provides the visitors with an overview.

The site was opened to the public again in September 2016 with a two-day festival which saw many participants performing medieval reenactments in costumes, including a group of women from Meinier who dressed up as "White Ladies".

== Popular myths and legends ==
=== "The White Lady of Rouelbeau" ===
A popular legend has been associated for centuries with the ruins. It centers around a woman without a name, supposedly the first wife of Humbert de Choulex, the first lord of the castle. He reportedly repudiated her when she did not give birth to a son. According to the saga, she has been haunting the area as a White Lady. Proponents of the legend argue that the ghost has been linked to the disappearance of people and deaths from unexplained causes, and that Christmas Eve is her preferred timing. It is alleged that on some occasion, the whole castle, along with its former inhabitants, was resurrected in its old glory for the night. La Dame Blanche herself is said to be of striking beauty and wearing a diadem.

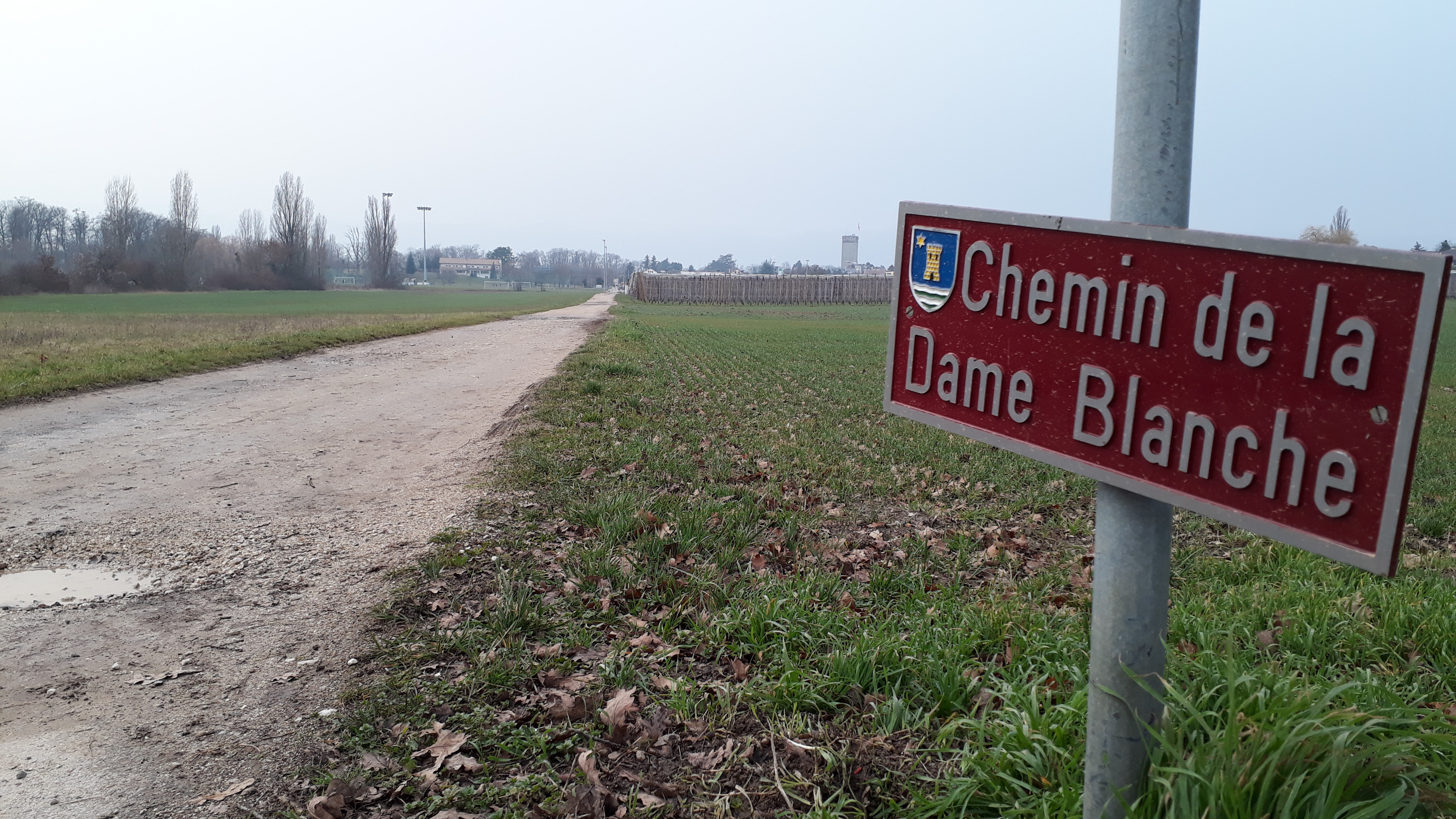
The ruins are behind the trees, left

In a version from 1870, which was published in 1902, a certain Jean Bahut told the story that he went out to the castle ruins on Christmas Eve as a sixteen-year-old during the French occupation of Geneva at the beginning of the 19th century to shoot some wild animals for dinner with his widowed and impoverished mother. He was hit by an ice-cold breath of air which made him shudder, his blood clot and his hair stand on end. In the darkness a white shadow came out of the tower uttering hollow groans. It touched him and disappeared. The young man tried to flee, but could not lift his feet from the ground. While the White Lady rewarded his commitment to his mother with a treasure of gold and silver, she punished his wealthy and greedy relative one year later in a deadly way by tricking and locking him into the vaults.

A dirt road through the fields next to the ruins is named Chemin de la Dame Blanche. In addition, a street about one kilometer to the North of the ruins bears the name Chemin de la Dame, a bus stop at its junction with the main street is called Vésenaz, La Dame. Some two and a half kilometers to the South in the municipality of Vandœuvres another street is named Chemin de la Blanche. The neighbouring municipality of Choulex still bears the name of the family, whose lineage Humbert as the first lord of the castle was from and which was first mentioned in a document almost nine hundred years ago as Cholay.

In late September 2019, the Geneva Chamber Orchestra performed a series of five live-concerts in the inner court of the castle ruins. The collaboration by four Geneva-born and/or -based artists, included a video installation and was titled Who is Afraid of the White Lady? (Qui a Peur de la Dame Blanche?).

=== "The Black Cat of Rouelbeau" ===
A second legend that has been associated with the ruins centers around a black tomcat - le chat noir - with fluorescent eyes. He is said to roam around the marsh on foggy days just before nightfall. Residents of the area feared him for sudden assaults with his razor-sharp claws which would tear his victims apart. Some would claim that it was the devil himself, who could only be fended off by dealing him one firm blow with a heavy club. However, they warned against dealing a second beating as a coup de grace, since the tomcat would in that case only recover its full power to throw its victim into hell.

The saga may be seen in the context of a troubling incident from 1567: during that year, the brothers Claude and Jenon Dexert, who lived at the fringes of the swamp, were accused of witchcraft. They confessed under torture to having consulted the devil and were executed. The black tomcat is supposedly their avenging angel.

== Galleries ==
=== Photographs by Frédéric Boissonnas from 1922 ===
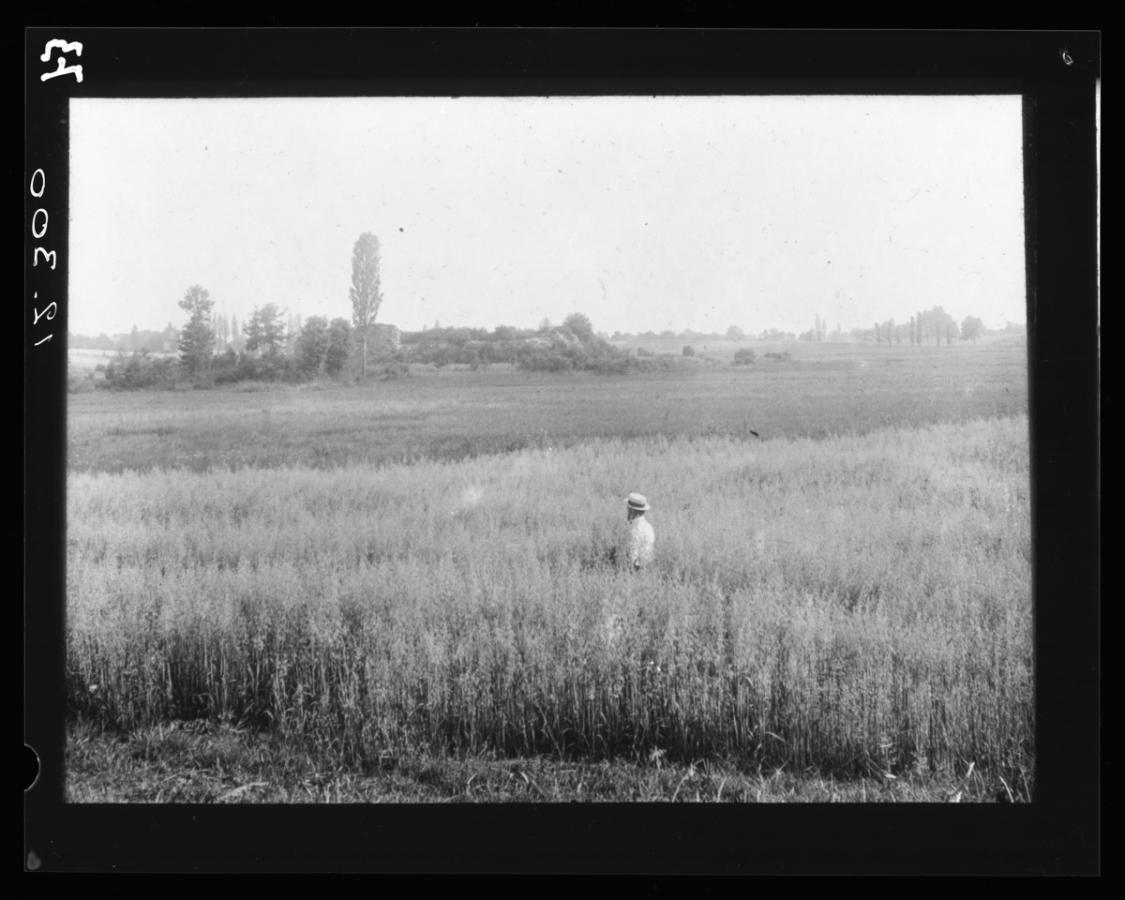

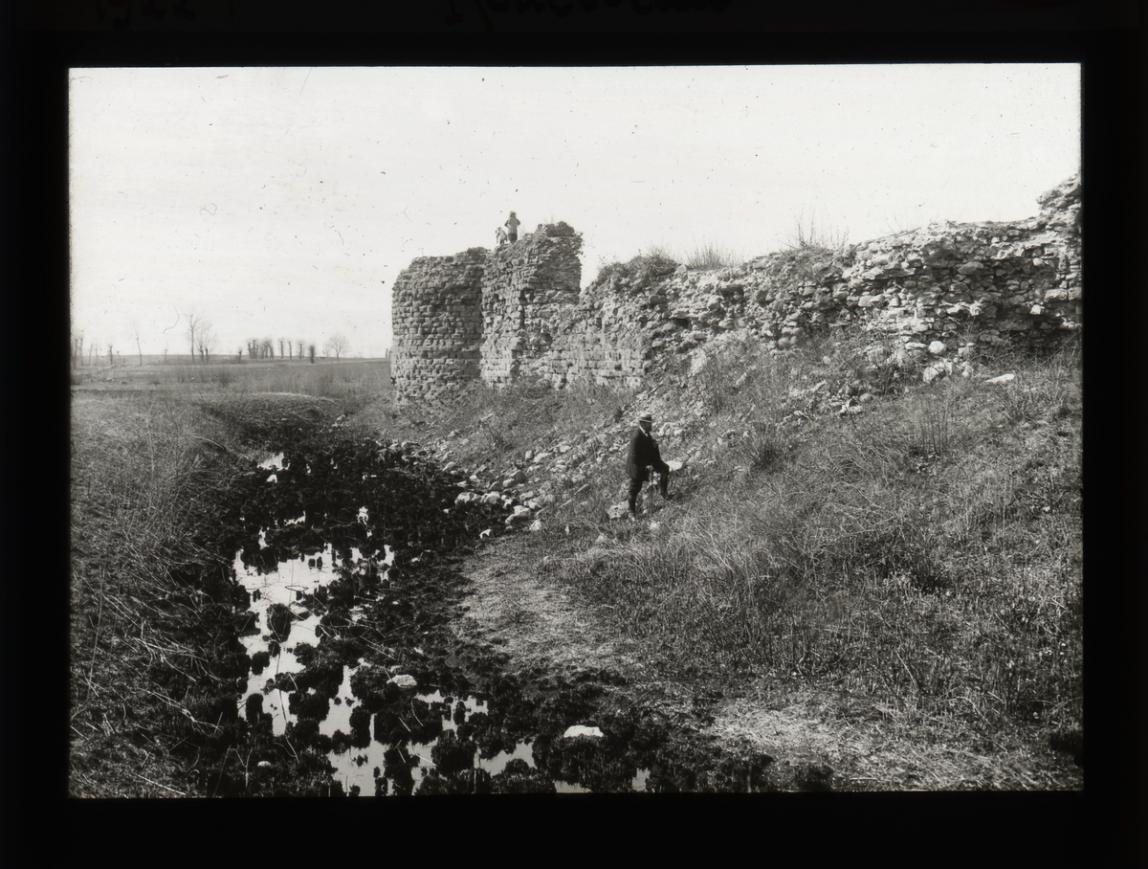

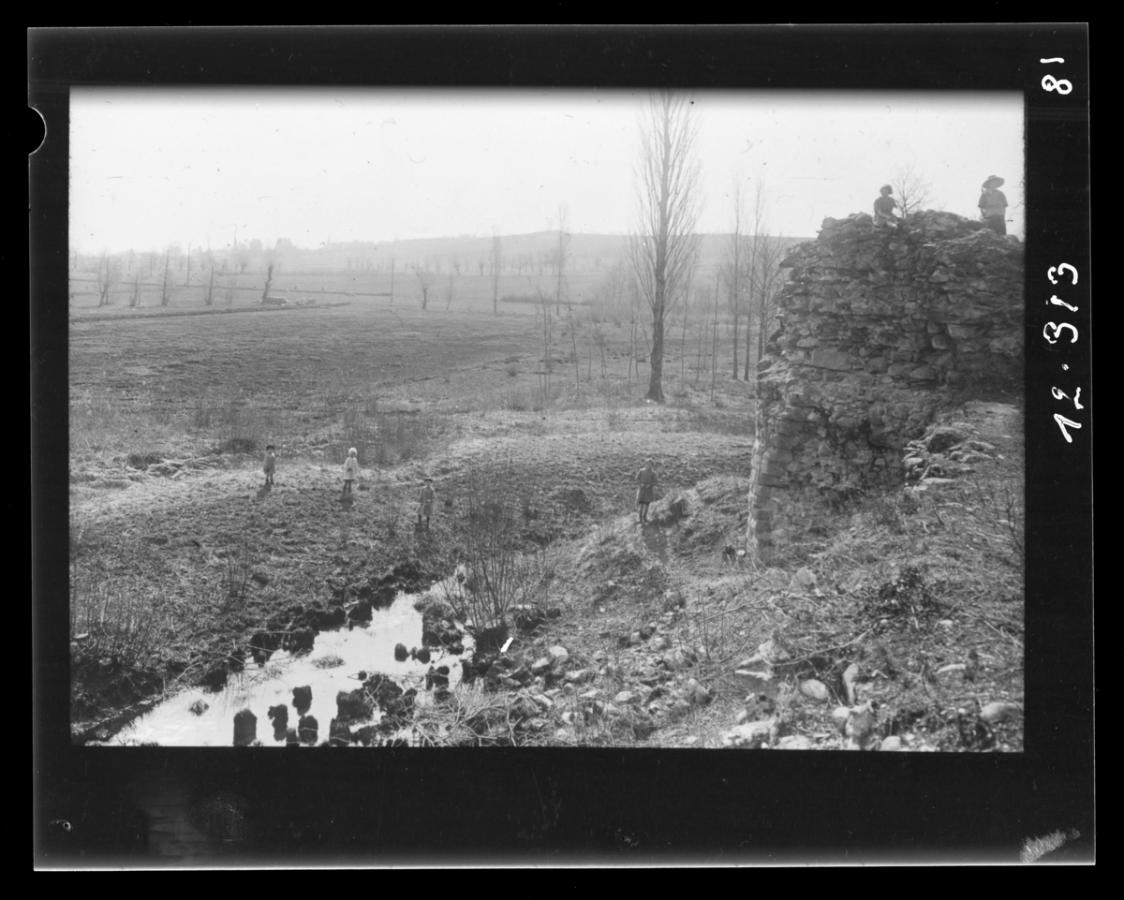

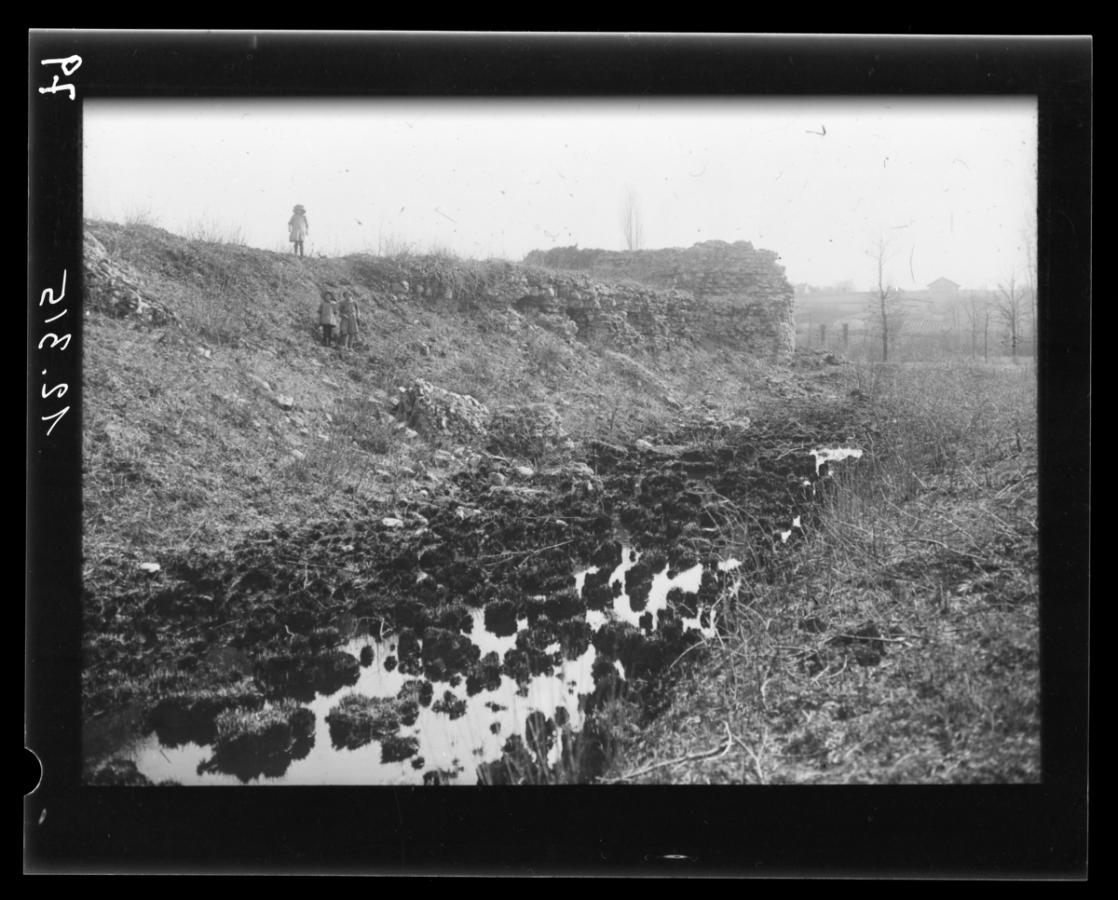

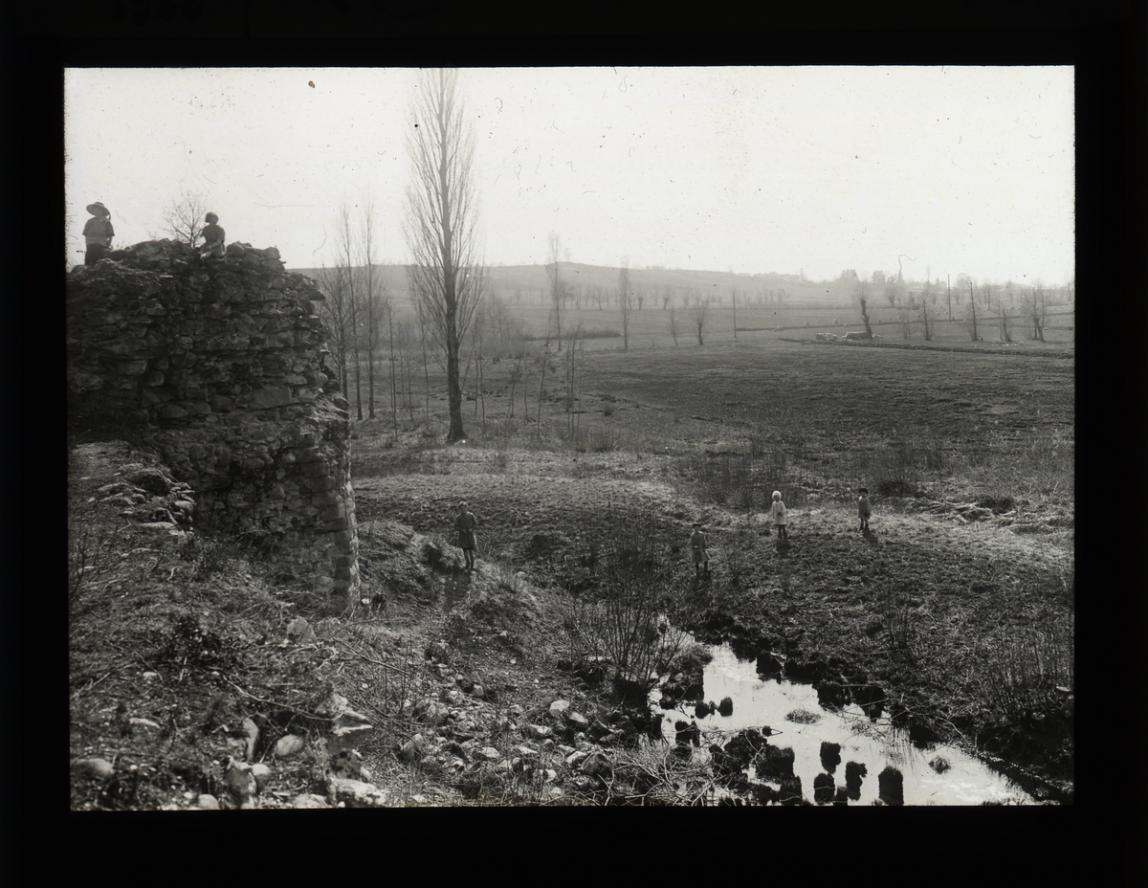

=== Photographs from 2020 ===
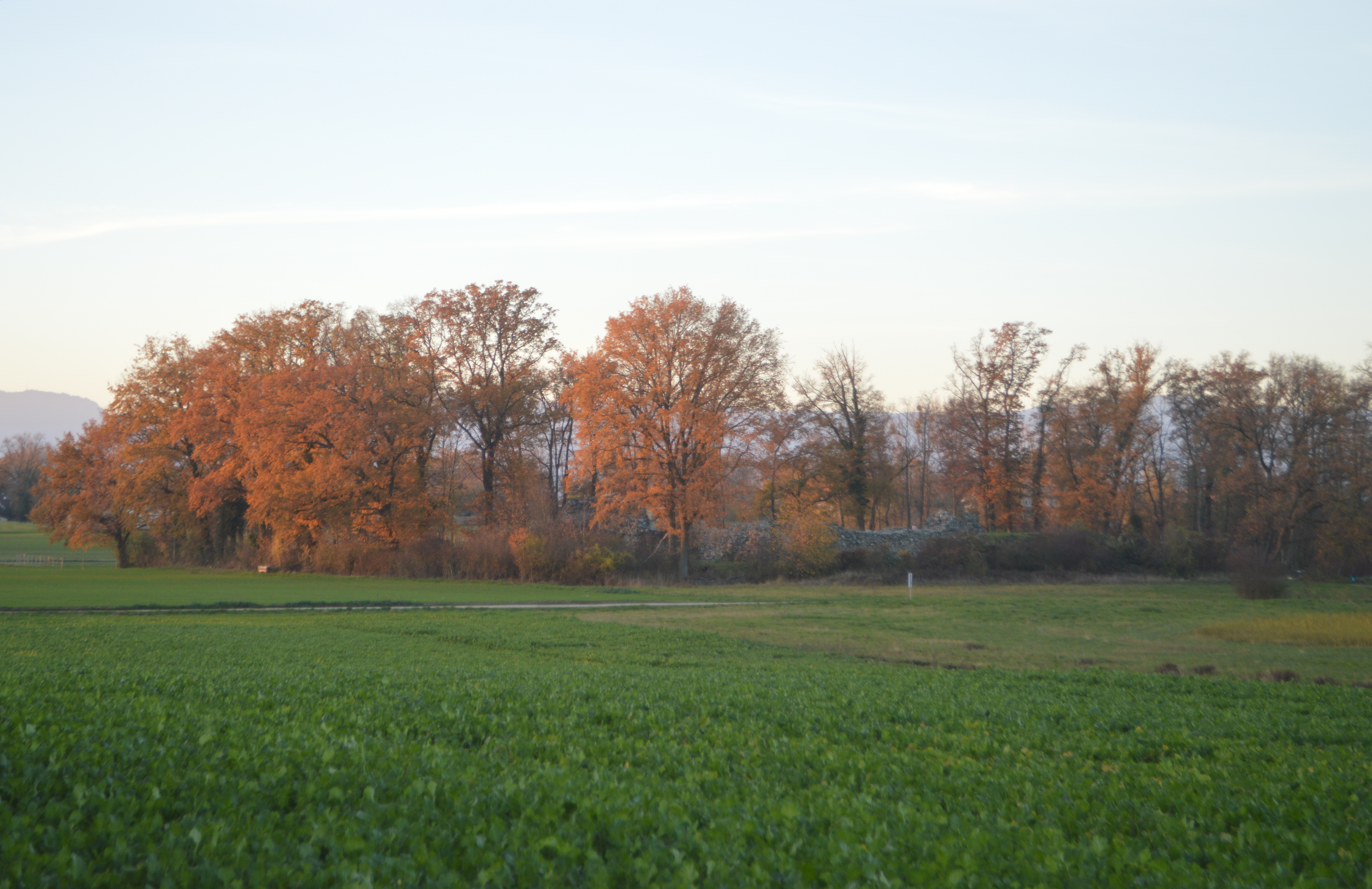

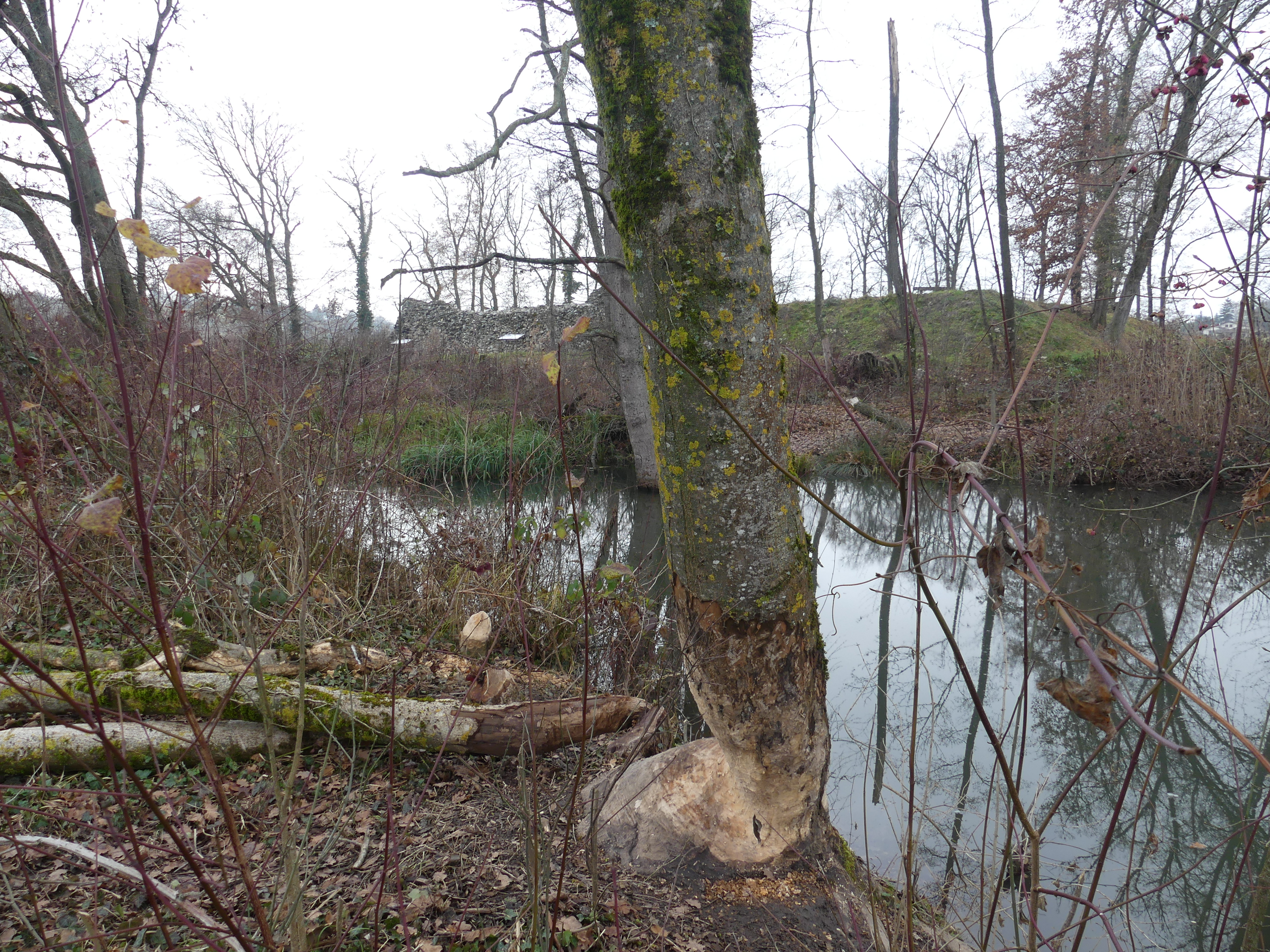

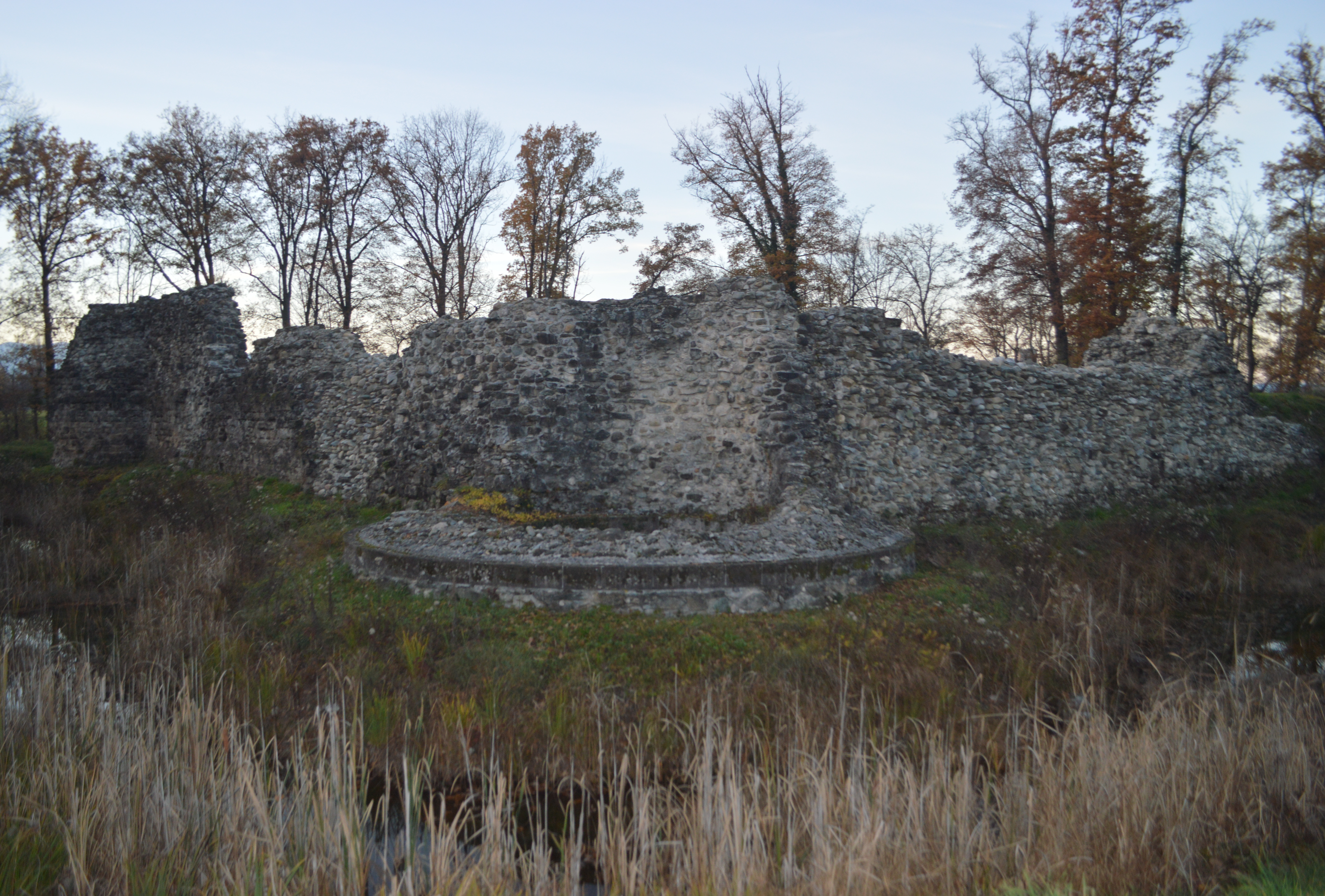

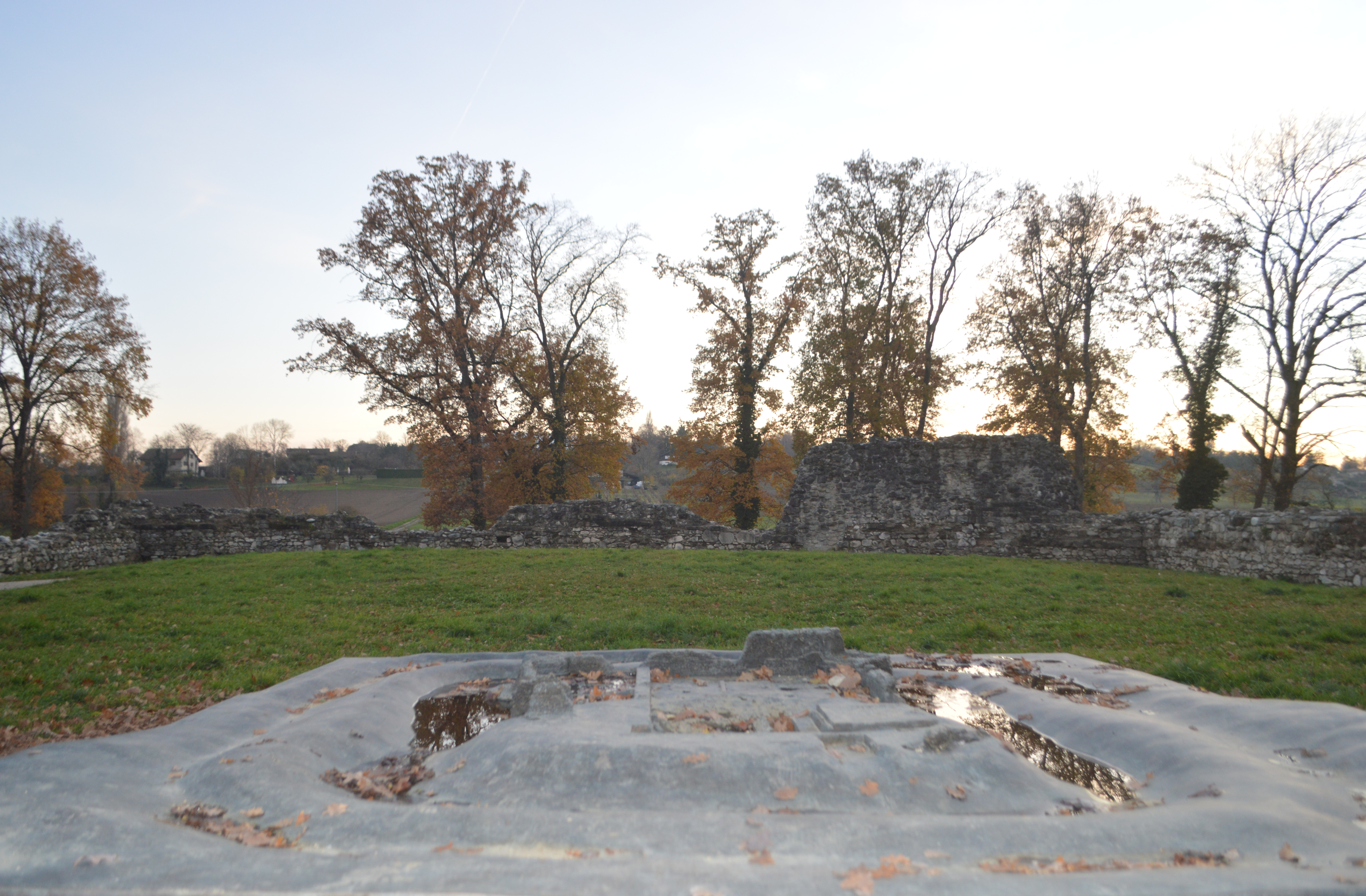

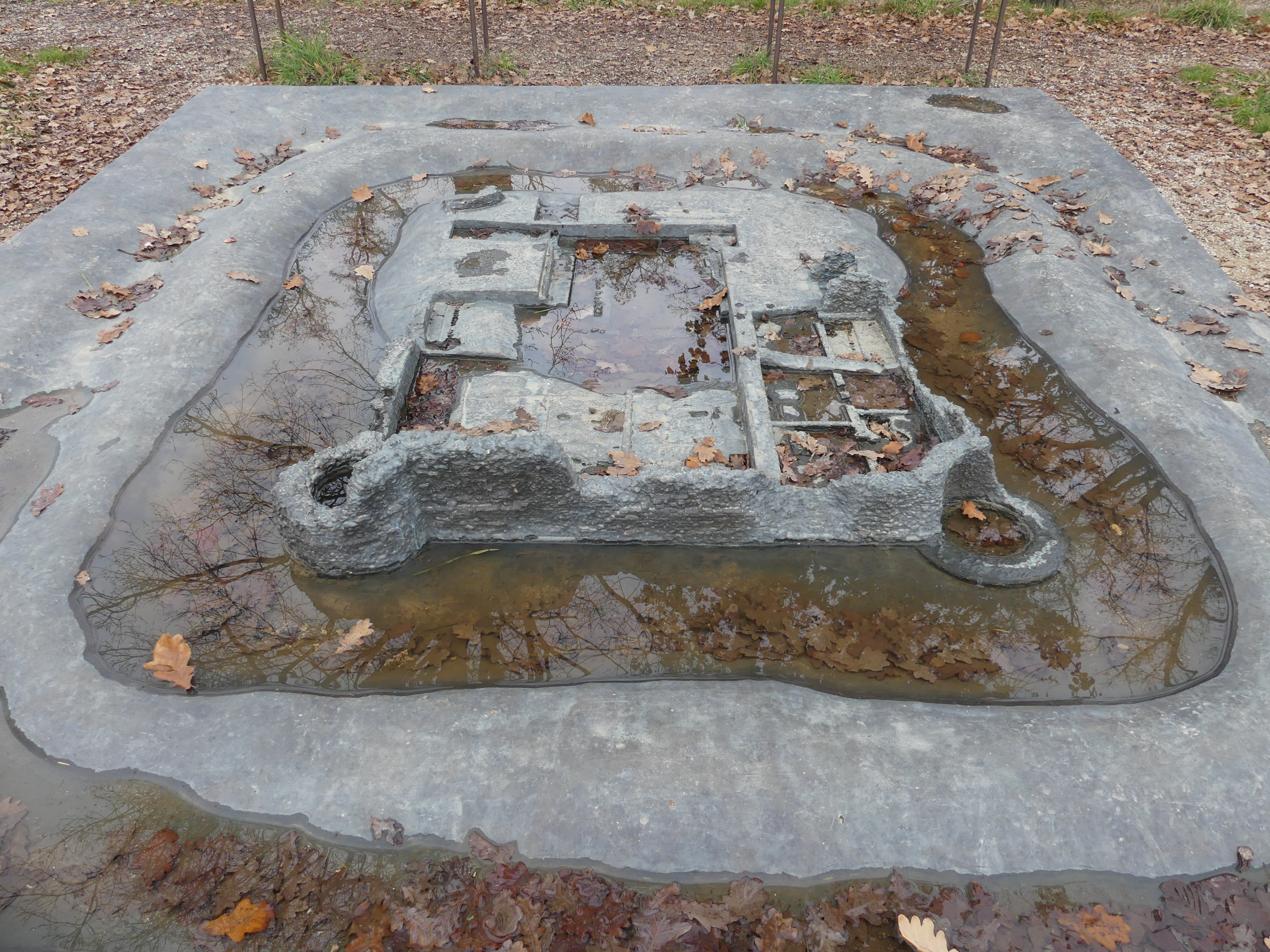

== See also ==
- List of castles in Switzerland
- Meinier
- Choulex
- House of Savoy

== Notes and references ==
=== References ===
- Blondel, Louis (1956). Châteaux de l'ancien diocèse de Genève. Mémoires et documents, 7th tome (in French). Geneva: Société d'histoire et d'archéologie.
- Montelle, Edith; Waldmann, Richard; Brüsch, Béat (1987). Die schönsten Märchen der Schweiz (in German). Vevey: Mondo Verlag.
- Jacquat-Morisod, Anne (2005). Choulex - 850 ans d'histoire. Yens sur Morges: Editions Cabédita. ISBN 978-2-88295-402-2.
- Terrier, Jean; Joguin Regelin, Michelle (2016). Aballéa, Sylvie (ed.). Châteaux forts et chevaliers, Genève et la Savoie au XIVe siècle (in French). Lausanne: Éditions Favre. ISBN 978-2-8289-1585-8.
- Terrier, Jean; Joguin Regelin, Michelle (2009a). "Rouelbeau: un château en bois édifié en 1318 au sommet d'un tertre artificiel". Archéologie Suisse: Bulletin d'Archéologie Suisse (in French). 32 (2): 54–63.
- Terrier, Jean; Joguin Regelin, Michelle (2009b). "Le château de Rouelbeau: une bâtie en bois édifiée au bas Moyen Âge dans les environs de Genève". Mittelalter (in French). 14 (4): 113–134.
- Vellas, Christian (2007). Légendes de Genève et du Genevois (in French). Geneva: Éditions Slatkine. ISBN 978-2-8321-0269-5.
