= Haptorida =

- A specimen from the genus Actinobola

Scientific classification
- Domain: Eukaryota
- Clade: Sar
- Clade: Alveolata
- Phylum: Ciliophora
- Class: Litostomatea
- Subclass: Haptoria
- Order: Haptorida; Corliss, 1974

Families
- Didiniidae; Spathidiidae; Spathidiidae incertae sedis (temporary name, contains nothing but the genus Proboscidium); Enchelyidae; Acropisthiidae; Helicoprorodontidae; Homalozoonidae; Lacrymariidae; Pseudotrachelocercidae; Tracheliidae; Trachelophyllidae

Order of ciliate protists

Haptorida is an order of ciliates. They may also be referred to as haptorids.
