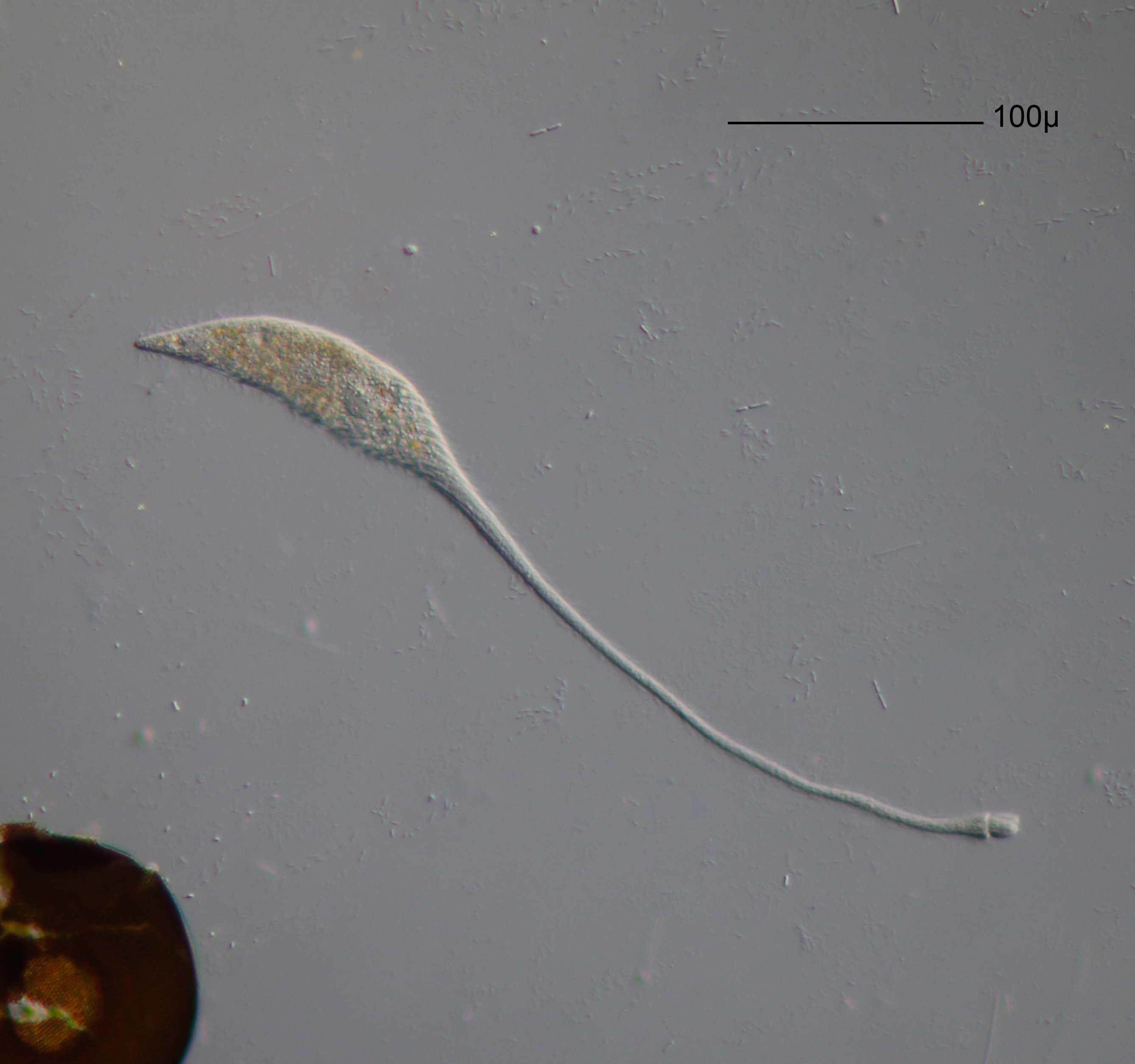
- Lacrymaria olor (Haptorida)

Scientific classification
- Domain: Eukaryota
- Clade: Sar
- Clade: Alveolata
- Phylum: Ciliophora
- Subphylum: Intramacronucleata
- Infraphylum: Rhabdophora
- Class: Litostomatea; Small & Lynn 1981

Typical orders
- Subclass Haptoria; Haptorida; Pleurostomatida; Subclass Trichostomatia; Vestibulifera; Entodiniomorphida; Subclass Rhynchostomatia; Dileptida; Tracheliida

= Litostomatea =

Class of single-celled organisms

The Litostomatea are a class of ciliates. The group consists of three subclasses: Haptoria, Trichostomatia and Rhynchostomatia. Haptoria includes mostly carnivorous forms such as Didinium, a species of which preys primarily on the ciliate Paramecium. Trichostomatia (trichostomes) are mostly endosymbionts in the digestive tracts of vertebrates. These include the species Balantidium coli, which is the only ciliate parasitic in humans. The group Rhynchostomatia includes two free-living orders previously included among the Haptoria, but now known to be genetically distinct from them, the Dileptida and the Tracheliida.

== Morphology ==
In litostomes, the body cilia arise from structures in the cell cortex called monokinetids, which are made up of a single cilium and its associated structures, such as basal bodies and microtubular fibres. These have an ultrastructural arrangement characteristic to the group.

The cell "mouth" (cytostome) is apical or subapical. In trichostomes it lies in a depression, or vestibule, containing modified somatic cilia. In one order, the Entodiniomorphida, the cilia are arranged into tufts or bands, and may be packed together to form syncilia, resembling the membranelles and cirri of spirotrichs (with which they were originally classified) and other ciliates. However, no true compound cilia occur.

In haptorians the mouth is typically surrounded by a ring of coronal cilia, arising from dikinetids derived from the anterior of the body kineties, and a ring of characteristic extrusomes called toxicysts. These discharge on contact with prey, penetrating and immobilizing them, and beginning digestion. In some forms the mouth is formed only during feeding, and everts to assist in capture. The cytopharynx takes the form of a straight tube, supported by rods or nematodesmata, which dilates greatly during ingestion. This structure is called a rhabdos, and is functionally and structurally distinct from the cyrtos found in several other classes.
