= Holotricha =

Order of single-celled organisms

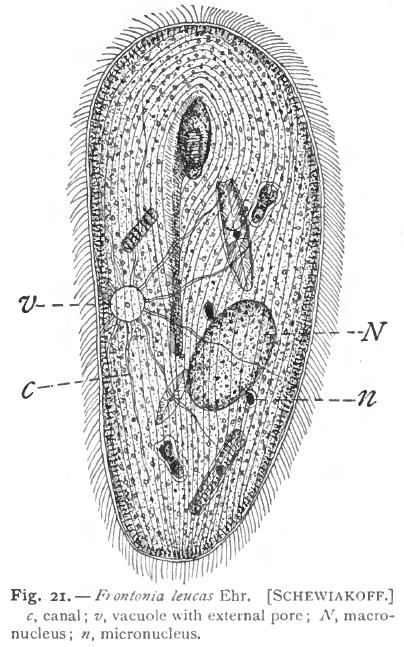
Holotrich, Frontonia leucas, by Schewiakoff, from Gary N. Calkins, The Protozoa 1910

Holotricha was an order of ciliates. The classification has fallen from use as a formal taxon, but the terms "holotrich" and "holotrichous" are still applied descriptively to organisms with cilia of uniform length distributed evenly over the surface of the body.

== Etymology ==
The term holotrich derives from the Ancient Greek ὅλος (hólos), meaning "whole, entire", and θρίξ,τριχός (thríx, trikhós), meaning 'hair', because of the even distribution of cilia over the surface of the cell.

== Classification ==
The order Holotricha was erected in 1859 by Friedrich Stein, who developed a system of classification in which ciliates were categorized according to the type and distribution of their cilia. The four major subdivisions of Stein's Ciliata were: Heterotricha, Peritricha, Hypotricha and Holotricha. The latter was reserved for organisms with cilia covering the entire surface of the body. The order included five families, within which a very diverse collection of genera were grouped. Among the better-known ciliates in Stein's Holotricha were Coleps, Nassula, Lacrymaria, Loxodes, Colpoda, Glaucoma and Paramecium.

Stein's scheme was amended in 1889 by Otto Bütschli, who divided the Ciliata into two orders: Holotricha and Spirotricha. Bütschli's Holotricha were described much as Stein's had been, as ciliates with relatively uniform somatic cilia. The other three orders of Stein's Ciliata were placed in a lower rank under the new order Spirotricha: ciliates possessing a well-developed structure of spiralling membranelles around the oral cavity.

Versions of Bütschli's two-order scheme were used by taxonomists throughout the first half of the twentieth century, although many adjustments were made to the arrangement of families and genera within those groups. Meanwhile, improved laboratory methods and the advent of the electron microscope began to reveal inadequacies in the old scheme; and, as inconsistencies accumulated, dissatisfaction with the system grew. Nonetheless, Holotricha remained in use as a high-level taxon until 1974, when John Corliss proposed a complete revision of the phylum Ciliophora. In his system, Spirotricha is retained as an order, under the class Polyhymenophora, but Holotricha does not appear at any rank. Recent systems of classification, including an influential scheme proposed by Pierre de Puytorac in 1994, and Denis Lynn's revision of 2002, make no mention of Holotricha.
