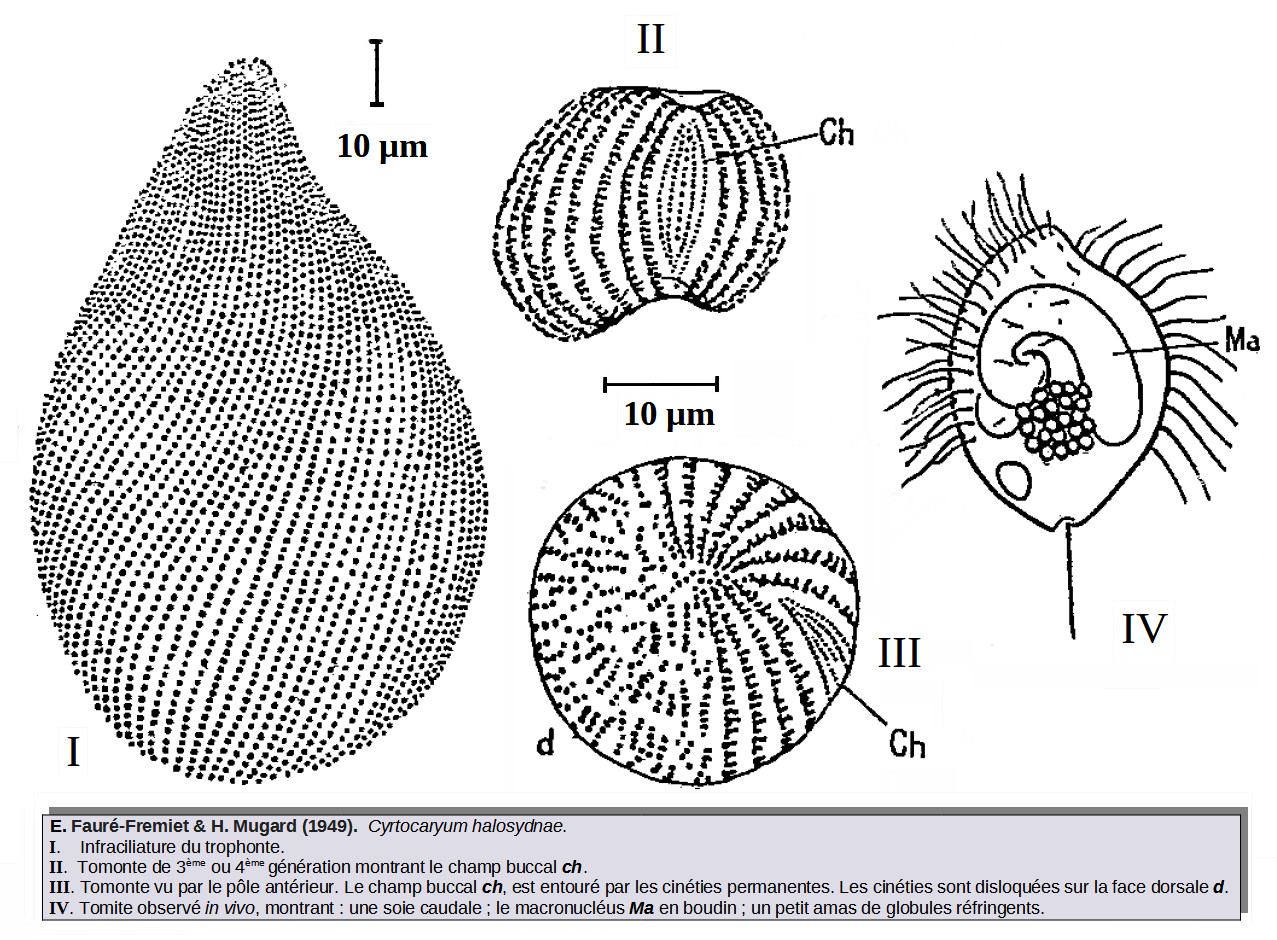
- Cyrtocaryum halosydnae of the order Apostomatida

Scientific classification
- Domain: Eukaryota
- Clade: Sar
- Superphylum: Alveolata
- Phylum: Ciliophora
- Class: Kinetofragminophora de Puytorac et al., 1974

= Kinetofragminophora =

Kinetofragminophora is a class of Ciliophora. WoRMS said that they will disuse this classification.

== Taxonomy ==
Kinetofragminophora contained the following orders:

- Apostomatida Chatton & Lwoff, 1928: Now belongs to Oligohymenophorea;
- Plagiopylida Jankowski, 1978
- Suctorida Claparède & Lachmann, 1858
- Trichostomatida Bütschli, 1889

But WoRMS further classify the class into the following three subclasses:

- Subclass Gymnostomata (disused)
  - Order Primociliatida accepted as Karyorelictea (junior synonym)
- Hypostomata (disused)
  - Order Chonotrichida (disused): becomes Chonotrichia of Phyllopharyngea
  - Order Cyrtophorida (disused)
- Subclass Vestibulifera (disused)
  - Order Trichostomatida (disused)
