= Endosphaera =

Scientific classification
- Domain: Eukaryota
- Clade: Sar
- Clade: Alveolata
- Phylum: Ciliophora
- Class: Phyllopharyngea
- Order: Endogenida
- Family: Endosphaeridae
- Genus: Endosphaera; Engelmann 1876

Type species
- Endosphaera engelmanni Entz 1896

Genus of ciliates

Endosphaera is a genus of suctorian ciliates described by George Engelmann in 1876. Species of Endosphaera are found in freshwater and seawater as either parasitic or commensal endosymbionts of other ciliates.

== Description ==
Members of the genus Endosphaera are symbiotic suctorian ciliates. Suctorians commonly have permanent adhesive organelles, but Endosphaera cells also exhibit a "perforatium", a temporary structure used for attachment to their host. They lack the typical stalks or tentacles found in other suctorians. Their life cycle is characterized by a free-swimming infective stage, or swarmer, and an adult intracellular stage that infects other ciliates.

Endosphaera species are among the most common suctorian symbionts of ciliates in both freshwater and seawater. They are mainly observed as endoparasites or endocommensals of peritrich ciliates, such as the genera Trichodina, Trichodinella and Mantoscyphidia, but also other ciliates such as the vorticellid Spongostena and the suctorian Dendrocometes.

== Classification ==
The genus Endosphaera was described in 1876 by German-American biologist George Engelmann, initially without designating any species. Later, four species were described, distinguished by the morphology of their swarmer stage: E. engelmanni, E. multifiliis, E. elisabetharum, and E. terebrans. In 1978, the family Endosphaeridae was created to accommodate Endosphaera and two similar genera, Parendosphaera and Acoelophthirius.
