= Chlamydonella apoprostomata =

Scientific classification
- Domain: Eukaryota
- Clade: Sar
- Clade: Alveolata
- Phylum: Ciliophora
- Class: Phyllopharyngea
- Order: Chlamydodontida
- Family: Lynchellidae
- Genus: Chlamydonella
- Species: C. apoprostomata

Binomial name
- Chlamydonella apoprostomata Wilbert & Song, 2008

Species of single-celled organism

Chlamydonella apoprostomata is a species of littoral ciliates, first found near King George Island.
