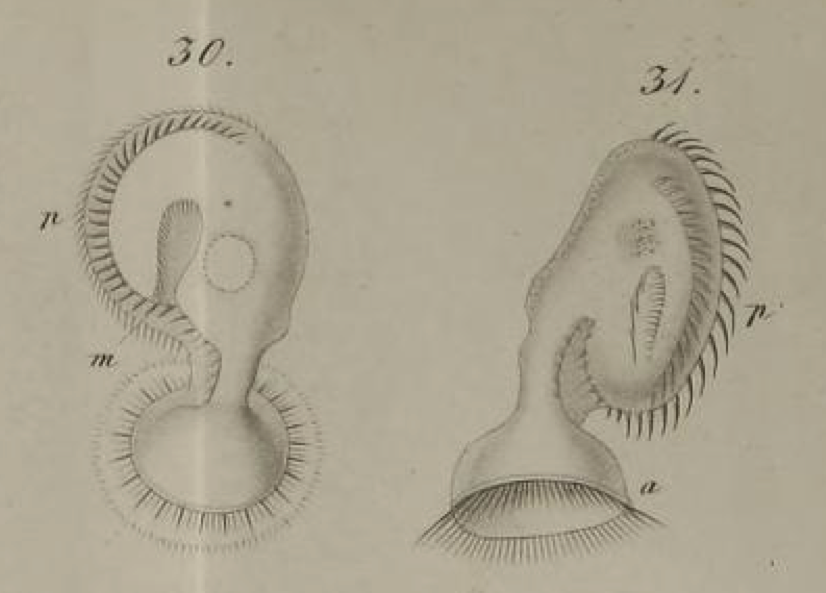
- Drawing of Licnophora (originally Trichodina) auerbachii by Cohn (1866), showing attachment disk (a), mouth (m), and adoral zone (p).

Scientific classification
- Domain: Eukaryota
- Clade: Sar
- Superphylum: Alveolata
- Phylum: Ciliophora
- Class: Spirotrichea
- Subclass: Licnophoria; Corliss, 1957
- Order: Licnophorida; Corliss, 1957
- Family: Licnophoridae; Bütschli, 1887
- Genus: Licnophora; Claparède, 1867

= Licnophora =

Genus of single-celled organisms

Licnophora is a genus of ciliates in the family Licnophoridae and order Licnophorida. They typically have an hourglass-like shape and live as ectocommensals on marine animals.

== Description ==
The cell body of most Licnophora species is shaped like an hourglass. The oral region is on one end, and is surrounded by specialized cilia (the adoral zone of oral polykinetids). The other end contains a circular attachment disk (or basal disk) that is used to attach to the substratum, a feature unique to licnophorids, although they can also be free-swimming.

Licnophora are ectocommensals, living attached to different kinds of marine animals, including gastropods, bivalves, polychaetes, and seahorses. One species was found attached to algae. Heavy infections of Licnophora auerbachii have been known to damage the eyes of the scallop Chlamys opercularis, by abrading the animal tissue when they attach to it.

== Systematics ==
The genus Licnophora was first defined by René-Édouard Claparède in 1867. He transferred the species Trichodina auerbachii Cohn, 1866 to this genus, and also named a new species L. cohnii in honor of Ferdinand Cohn. The genus was formerly classified as a heterotrich. More recent classification systems place it within the Spirotrichea, because of evidence from molecular phylogenetics and some morphological features of the macronucleus. However, another analysis has found that it is an "isolated branch" within the subphylum Intramacronucleata that is most closely related to the Spirotrichea, Armophorea, and Clevelandellidae.

=== Etymology ===
The name means "fan-bearer".

=== List of species ===
As of 2000, eleven species of Licnophora have been described:

- Licnophora auerbachii (Cohn, 1866)
- Licnophora bassoni L. L. van As & J. G. Van As, 2000
- Licnophora biecheleri Villeneuve-Brachon, 1940
- Licnophora bullae Dustin, 1915
- Licnophora chattoni Villeneuve-Brachon, 1939
- Licnophora cohnii Claparéde, 1867
- Licnophora conklini Stevens, 1904
- Licnophora hippocampi Meng and Yu, 1985
- Licnophora limpetae Van As, Van As and Basson, 1999
- Licnophora lyngbycola Fauré-Fremiet, 1937
- Licnophora macfarlandi Stevens, 1901
