= Parablepharismea =

Scientific classification
- Domain: Eukaryota
- Supergroup: Alveolata
- Phylum: Ciliophora
- Subphylum: Intramacronucleata
- Class: Parablepharismea; Rotterová et al., 2020
- Order: Parablepharismida; Rotterová et al., 2020
- Family: Parablepharismidae; Campello-Nunes et al., 2020

Genera
- Kahlium; Parablepharisma

Class of single-celled organisms

Parablepharismea is a class of free-living marine and brackish anaerobic ciliates that form a major clade of obligate anaerobes within the SAL group (Spirotrichea, Armophorea, and Litostomatea), together with the classes Muranotrichea and Armophorea.

Parablepharismea are medium to large, elongated ciliates with navicular outline and holotrichous somatic ciliature composed of dikinetids without postciliodesmata. Their oral ciliature is composed of bipartite paroral membrane and adoral zone of membranelles. They host a thick coat of prokaryotic ectosymbionts and cytoplasmic endosymbionts. They are found in micro-oxic marine to brackish habitats.

Parablepharismea may be related to the deep sea Cariacotrichea ciliates.

This class contains a single order, Parablepharismida, and family Parablepharismidae. The genus Parablepharisma includes five species. The genus Kahlium includes a single species K. chlamydophorum with segmented paroral area and a twisted posterior.
