= Metopus murrayensis =

Scientific classification
- Domain: Eukaryota
- Clade: Sar
- Clade: Alveolata
- Phylum: Ciliophora
- Class: Armophorea
- Order: Metopida
- Family: Metopidae
- Genus: Metopus
- Species: M. murrayensis

Binomial name
- Metopus murrayensis Vďačný & Foissner, 2016

Species of single-celled organism

Metopus murrayensis is a species of metopid first found in soil from the Murray River floodplain, Australia, after which it is named. It can be distinguished by having a globular macronucleus surrounded by many refractive granules and a big preoral dome.
