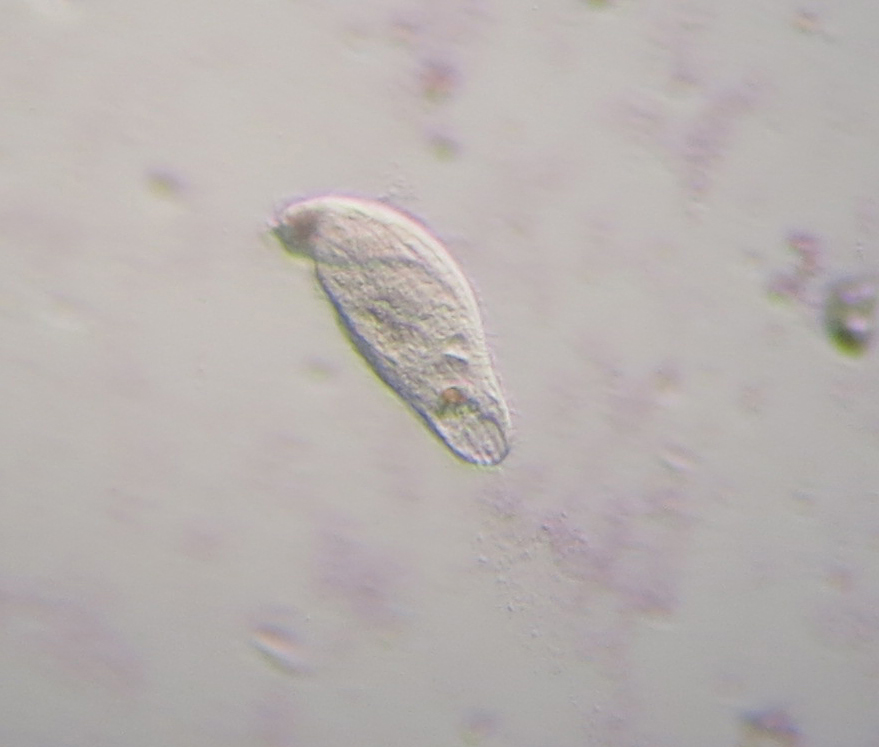

Scientific classification
- Domain: Eukaryota
- Clade: Sar
- Clade: Alveolata
- Phylum: Ciliophora
- Class: Armophorea
- Order: Metopida
- Family: Metopidae
- Genus: Metopus; Claparède & Lachmann, 1858

Species
- Metopus brachoni Metopus brevicristatus Metopus contortus Metopus es Metopus extensus Metopus filum Metopus fuscus Metopus halophilus Metopus histophagus Metopus hyalinus Metopus jankowskii Metopus lemani Metopus magnus Metopus major Metopus murrayensis Metopus nivaaensis Metopus palaeformides Metopus pellitus Metopus rotundus Metopus setosus Metopus spiralis Metopus rex Metopus verrucosus Metopus vestitus

= Metopus =

Genus of single-celled organisms

Metopus is a genus of anaerobic organisms from the family of Metopidae.
