= Dendrocometes =

Scientific classification
- Domain: Eukaryota
- Clade: Diaphoretickes
- Clade: SAR
- Clade: Alveolata
- Phylum: Ciliophora
- Class: Phyllopharyngea
- Family: Dendrocometidae
- Genus: Dendrocometes; F. Stein

Genus of single-celled organisms

Dendrocometes is a genus of suctorian infusoria, characterized by the repeatedly branched attached body; each of the lobes of the body gives off a few retractile tentacles. It is epibiotic on the gills of the so-called freshwater shrimp Gammarus pulex.
