= Cavichona =

Scientific classification
- Domain: Eukaryota
- Supergroup: Alveolata
- Phylum: Ciliophora
- Class: Phyllopharyngea
- Order: Exogemmida
- Family: Spirochonidae
- Genus: Cavichona; Jankowski, 1973

Species
- Cavichona cincinnata Jankowski, 1973 (type); Cavichona elegans Swarczewsky 1929

Genus of single-celled organisms

Cavichona is a genus of ciliates in the family Spirochonidae.
