= Muranotrichea =

Scientific classification
- Domain: Eukaryota
- Clade: Diaphoretickes
- Clade: SAR
- Clade: Alveolata
- Phylum: Ciliophora
- Subphylum: Intramacronucleata
- Class: Muranotrichea; Rotterová et al., 2020
- Order: Muranotrichida; Rotterová et al., 2020
- Family: Muranotrichidae; Rotterová et al., 2020

Genera
- Muranothrix; Thigmothrix

Class of single-celled organisms

Muranotrichea is a class of free-living marine anaerobic ciliates, that, together with the classes Parablepharismea and Armophorea, form a major clade of obligate anaerobes within the SAL group (Spirotrichea, Armophorea, and Litostomatea).

Muranotrichea are medium to large, elongated holotrichous ciliates with contractile body and somatic ciliature composed of dikinetids. Their oral ciliature includes an elongated key-hole shaped peristome, an adoral zone of membranelles spiraling rightward around distinctly neck-like anterior body part; and heteromorphic paroral membrane . They inhabit micro-oxic marine to brackish sediments and host prokaryotic ectosymbionts and endosymbionts.

The class contains a single order Muranotrichida and family Muranotrichidae.

Muranotrichidae include two species, Muranothrix gubernata and Thigmothrix strigosa.

Muranotrichea together with Parablepharismea was described by Rotterova et al. in 2020.
