= Cavichona elegans =

Scientific classification
- Domain: Eukaryota
- Supergroup: Alveolata
- Phylum: Ciliophora
- Class: Phyllopharyngea
- Order: Exogemmida
- Family: Spirochonidae
- Genus: Cavichona
- Species: C. elegans

Binomial name
- Cavichona elegans Swarczewsky, 1929

Species of single-celled organism

Cavichona elegans is a species of ciliate in the family Spirochonidae.
