= Plagiopyla =

Scientific classification
- Domain: Eukaryota
- Clade: Sar
- Superphylum: Alveolata
- Phylum: Ciliophora
- Class: Plagiopylea
- Order: Plagiopylida
- Family: Plagiopylidae
- Genus: Plagiopyla; Stein, 1860

Species
- Plagiopyla binucleata Agamaliev, 1978; Plagiopyla cucullio Quennerstedt, 1867; Plagiopyla simplex Wetzel, 1928; Plagiopyla frontata Kahl, 1935; Plagiopyla marina Kahl 1933; Plagiopyla megastoma (Smith, 1898); Plagiopyla minuta Powers, 1933; Plagiopyla nasuta Stein, 1860; Plagiopyla ovata Kahl, 1931; Plagiopyla vestita Kahl, 1935; Plagiopyla nyctotherus Poljansky & Golikova, 1959; Plagiopyla stenostoma Alekperov & Asadullayeva, 1996; Plagiopyla ramani Nitla et al., 2019; Plagiopyla narasimhamurtii Nitla et al., 2019; Plagiopyla mystax comb. nov. Nitla et al., 2019

Genus of single-celled organisms

Plagiopyla is a genus of ciliates. It includes nine species:
