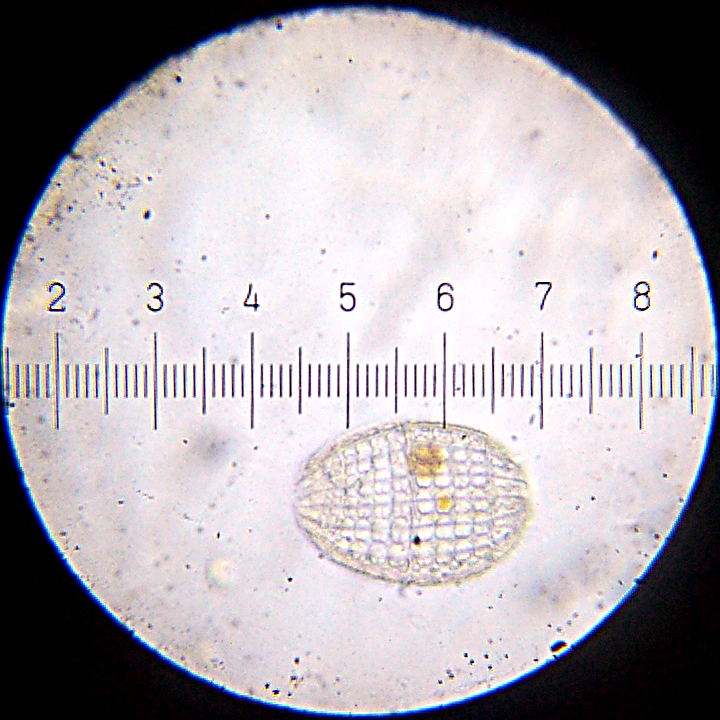
- Coleps

Scientific classification
- Domain: Eukaryota
- Clade: Sar
- Clade: Alveolata
- Phylum: Ciliophora
- Class: Prostomatea
- Order: Prorodontida
- Family: Colepidae; Ehrenberg, 1838

Genera
- Coleps; Plagiopogon; Tiarina

= Colepidae =

Family of single-celled organisms

Colepidae is a family of ciliates comprising the genera Coleps, Plagiopogon and Tiarina.

The family was named by Christian Ehrenberg as Colepina in 1838, with the latin description: Animalia polygastrica, enterodela (tubo intestinali distincto instructa), oris anique aperturis in corporis axi longitudinali oppositis, terminalibus (enantiodreta), et lorica involuta. (= Enchelia loricata.) In a free translation, he described Colepina as "polygastric animals, with a distinct intestinal tube, mouth and anus openings on the longitudinal axis of the body opposite each other, terminal (enantiodromic), and with an enveloped lorica."
