= Metopus magnus =

Scientific classification
- Domain: Eukaryota
- Clade: Sar
- Clade: Alveolata
- Phylum: Ciliophora
- Class: Armophorea
- Order: Metopida
- Family: Metopidae
- Genus: Metopus
- Species: M. magnus

Binomial name
- Metopus magnus Vďačný & Foissner, 2016

Species of single-celled organism

Metopus magnus is a species of metopid first found in soil from the Murray River floodplain, Australia. This species can be distinguished from its congeners by its large body size and the shape of the macronucleus; this species' micronucleus is located situated in a small macronuclear concavity.
