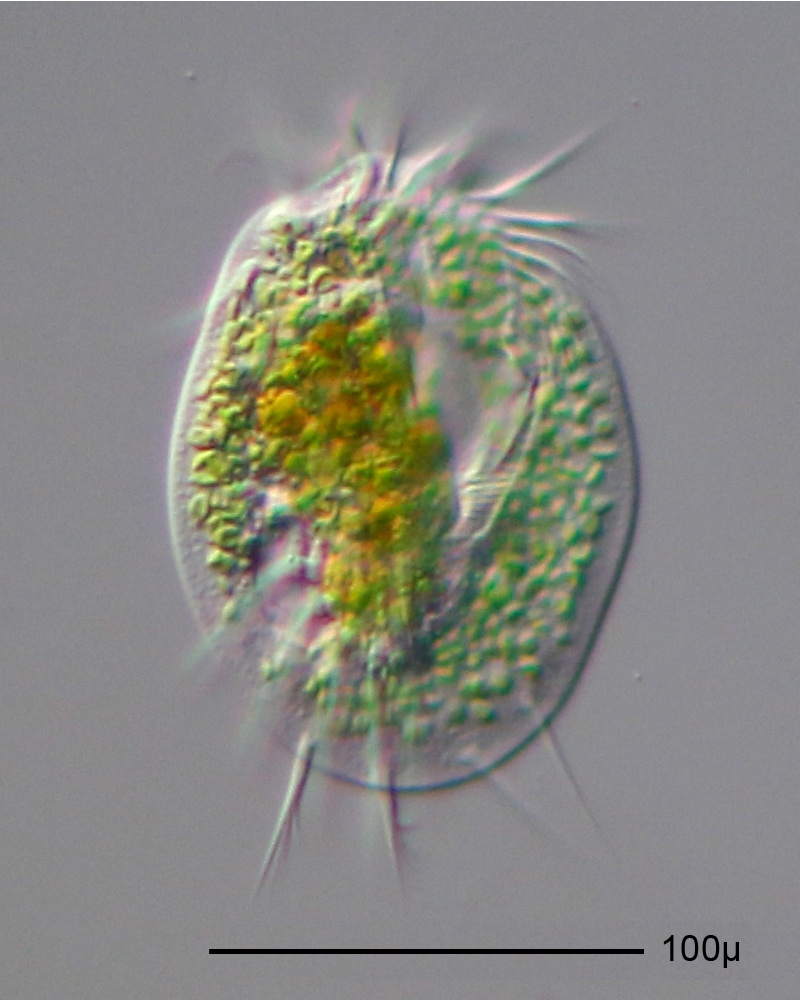
- Euplotes sp.

Scientific classification
- Domain: Eukaryota
- Clade: Sar
- Clade: Alveolata
- Phylum: Ciliophora
- Class: Spirotrichea
- Order: Euplotida
- Family: Euplotidae
- Genus: Euplotes; Ehrenberg, 1830

Species
- Many, including: Euplotes charon; Euplotes dragescoi; Euplotes elegans; Euplotes patella; Euplotes petzi

= Euplotes =

Genus of single-celled organisms

Euplotes is a genus of ciliates in the subclass Euplotia. Species are widely distributed in marine and freshwater environments, as well as soil and moss. Most members of the genus are free-living, but two species have been recorded as commensal organisms in the digestive tracts of sea urchins.

== Description ==
Euplotes cells are inflexible, dorsoventrally flattened, and roughly ovoid, with a very large oral region (peristome) bordered on the left by a long "adoral zone of membranelles" (AZM). Like other spirotrich ciliates, Euplotes move and feed with the help of compound ciliary organelles called "cirri," made up of thick tufts of cilia sparsely distributed on the cell. Strong cirri on the ventral surface of the cell enable Euplotes to walk or crawl on submerged detritus and vegetation. All species of Euplotes have a group of stiff bristles (caudal cirri), which protrude from the posterior of the cell. The number of caudal cirri varies, even within a species, but it is most common for Euplotes to have 4 or 5. The macronucleus is typically long and narrow, and approximately horseshoe-shaped, C-shaped, or resembling the number 3.

== History and classification ==
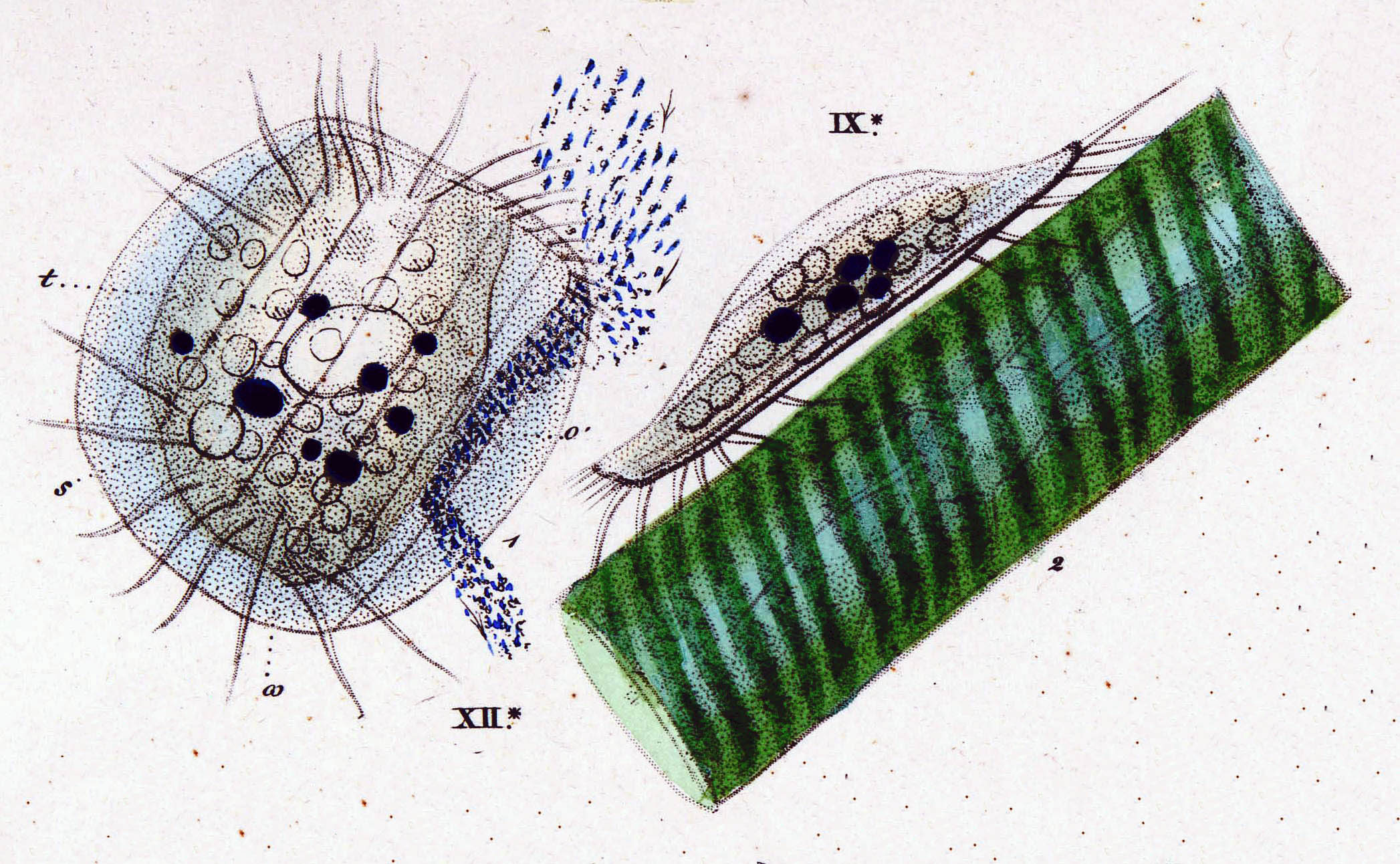
Euplotes patella, as depicted by C.G. Ehrenberg in 1838

Species of Euplotes were first recorded in 1773 by the Danish naturalist O.F. Müller, who placed them in the genus Trichoda. In 1830, German microscopist C.G. Ehrenberg created the genus Euplotes. By 1975, over 80 species and varieties had been described and assigned to Euplotes.

In older classification schemes, Euplotes is usually placed among hypotrichs, either in the order Hypotrichida, the subclass Hypotrichia or the class Hypotrichea. In current classification, Euplotes is placed apart from the other traditional hypotrichs, in the subclass Euplotia.
