= Chlamydonella =

Scientific classification
- Domain: Eukaryota
- Clade: Sar
- Clade: Alveolata
- Phylum: Ciliophora
- Class: Phyllopharyngea
- Order: Chlamydodontida
- Family: Lynchellidae
- Genus: Chlamydonella; Petz, Song & Wilbert 1995

Species
- Chlamydonella apoprostomata Chlamydonella derouxi Chlamydonella monostyla Chlamydonella prostomata Chlamydonella pseudochilodon

Genus of single-celled organisms

Chlamydonella is a genus of marine ciliates found in the seas around Antarctica.
