= Euplotes elegans =

Scientific classification
- Domain: Eukaryota
- Clade: Sar
- Clade: Alveolata
- Phylum: Ciliophora
- Class: Spirotrichea
- Order: Euplotida
- Family: Euplotidae
- Genus: Euplotes
- Species: E. elegans

Binomial name
- Euplotes elegans Kahl, 1932

Species of single-celled organism

Euplotes elegans is a species of marine ciliates. It has been isolated from the anoxic Mariager Fjord.
