= Urotricha antarctica =

Scientific classification
- Domain: Eukaryota
- Supergroup: Alveolata
- Phylum: Ciliophora
- Class: Prostomatea
- Order: Prorodontida
- Family: Urotrichidae
- Genus: Urotricha
- Species: U. antarctica

Binomial name
- Urotricha antarctica Wilbert & Song, 2008

Species of single-celled organism

Urotricha antarctica is a species of littoral ciliate, first found near King George Island.
