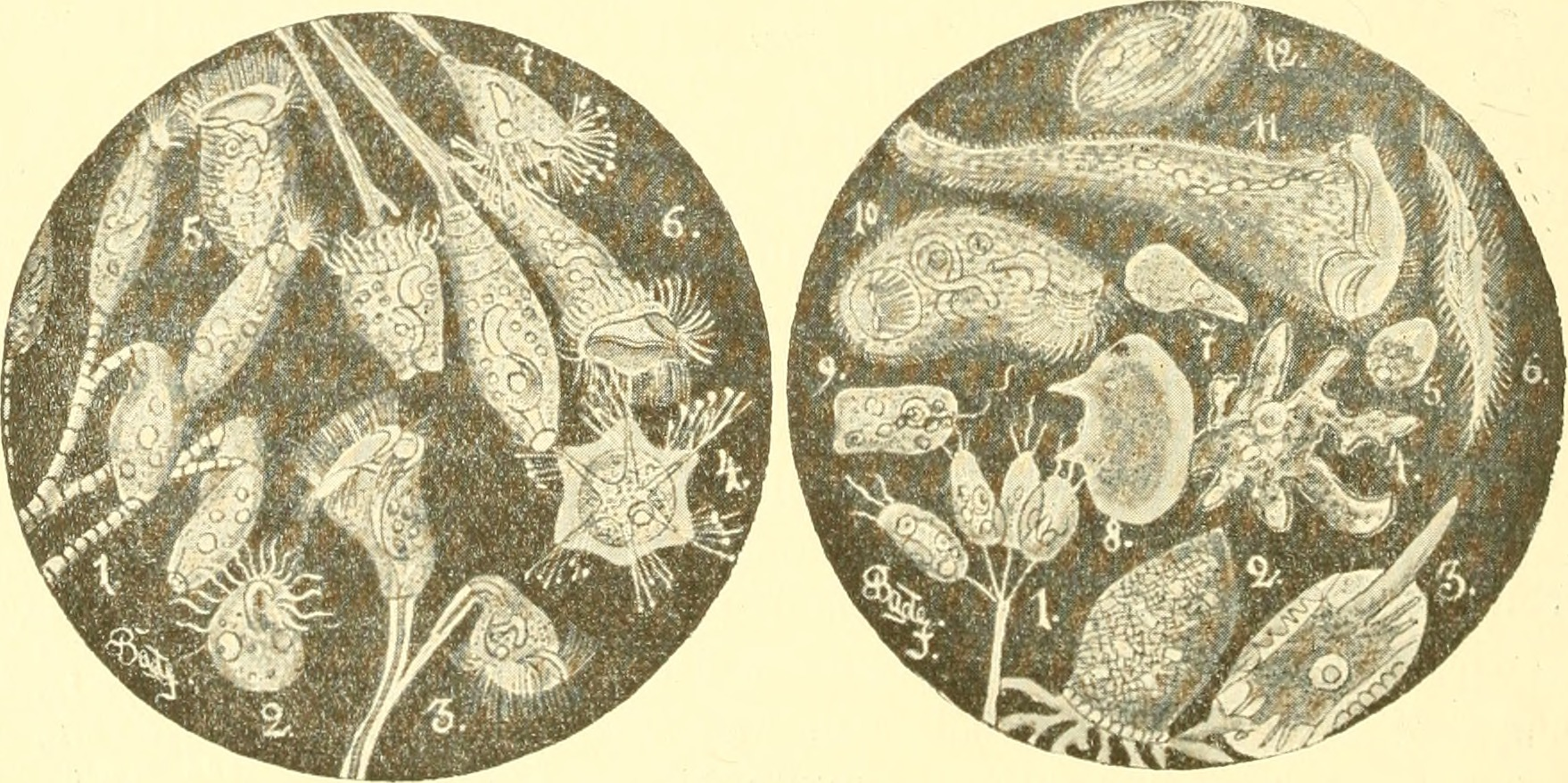
- Tokophrya quadripartita (left image, figure 7)

Scientific classification
- Domain: Eukaryota
- Supergroup: Alveolata
- Phylum: Ciliophora
- Class: Phyllopharyngea
- Order: Endogenida
- Family: Tokophryidae
- Genus: Tokophrya; Bütschli, 1889

= Tokophrya =

Genus of single-celled organisms

Tokophrya is a genus of suctorians. An example is Tokophrya lemnarum. The genus used to belong to the family Dendrosomatidae, but now has been assigned to the family Tokophryidae.

== Species ==
As of 9 December 2024, ITIS listed only two species of this genus:

- Tokophrya cyclopum
- Tokophrya infusionum
- Tokophrya lemnarum
- Tokophrya quadripartita
