= Euplotes dragescoi =

Scientific classification
- Domain: Eukaryota
- Clade: Sar
- Clade: Alveolata
- Phylum: Ciliophora
- Class: Spirotrichea
- Order: Euplotida
- Family: Euplotidae
- Genus: Euplotes
- Species: E. dragescoi

Binomial name
- Euplotes dragescoi Wilbert & Song, 2008

Species of single-celled organism

Euplotes dragescoi is a species of littoral ciliates, first found near King George Island.
