= Metopus rex =

Scientific classification
- Domain: Eukaryota
- Clade: Sar
- Clade: Alveolata
- Phylum: Ciliophora
- Class: Armophorea
- Order: Metopida
- Family: Metopidae
- Genus: Metopus
- Species: M. rex

Binomial name
- Metopus rex Vďačný & Foissner, 2016

Species of single-celled organism

Metopus rex is a species of metopid first found in soil from the Murray River floodplain, Australia. This species can be distinguished from its congeners by its large body size and the shape of the macronucleus. M. rex exhibits up to 30μm-long endosymbiotic bacteria.
