= Metopus palaeformides =

Scientific classification
- Domain: Eukaryota
- Clade: Sar
- Clade: Alveolata
- Phylum: Ciliophora
- Class: Armophorea
- Order: Metopida
- Family: Metopidae
- Genus: Metopus
- Species: M. palaeformides

Binomial name
- Metopus palaeformides Vďačný & Foissner, 2016

Species of single-celled organism

Metopus palaeformides is a species of metopid first found in soil from the Murray River floodplain, Australia. It closely resembles Heterometopus palaeformis, but can be distinguished from its cogenerate species by the size of its body, number of adoral polykinetids and its oral area pattern.
