= Metopus filum =

Scientific classification
- Domain: Eukaryota
- Clade: Sar
- Clade: Alveolata
- Phylum: Ciliophora
- Class: Armophorea
- Order: Metopida
- Family: Metopidae
- Genus: Metopus
- Species: M. filum

Binomial name
- Metopus filum Vďačný & Foissner, 2016

Species of single-celled organism

Metopus filum is a species of metopid first found in soil from the Murray River floodplain, Australia. It can be distinguished from its congeners by its thin body, an absence of cortical granules, and a low number of ciliary rows and adoral polykinetids.
