= Odontostomatida =

Odontostomes

Scientific classification
- Domain: Eukaryota
- Clade: Diaphoretickes
- Clade: SAR
- Clade: Alveolata
- Phylum: Ciliophora
- Subphylum: Intramacronucleata
- Infraphylum: incertae sedis
- Order: Odontostomatida; Sawaya 1940

Order of single-celled organisms

Odontostomatida is a small order of ciliates, referred to as odontostomes. They use their cilia, or hair-like structures on unicellular organisms, to propel themselves.
