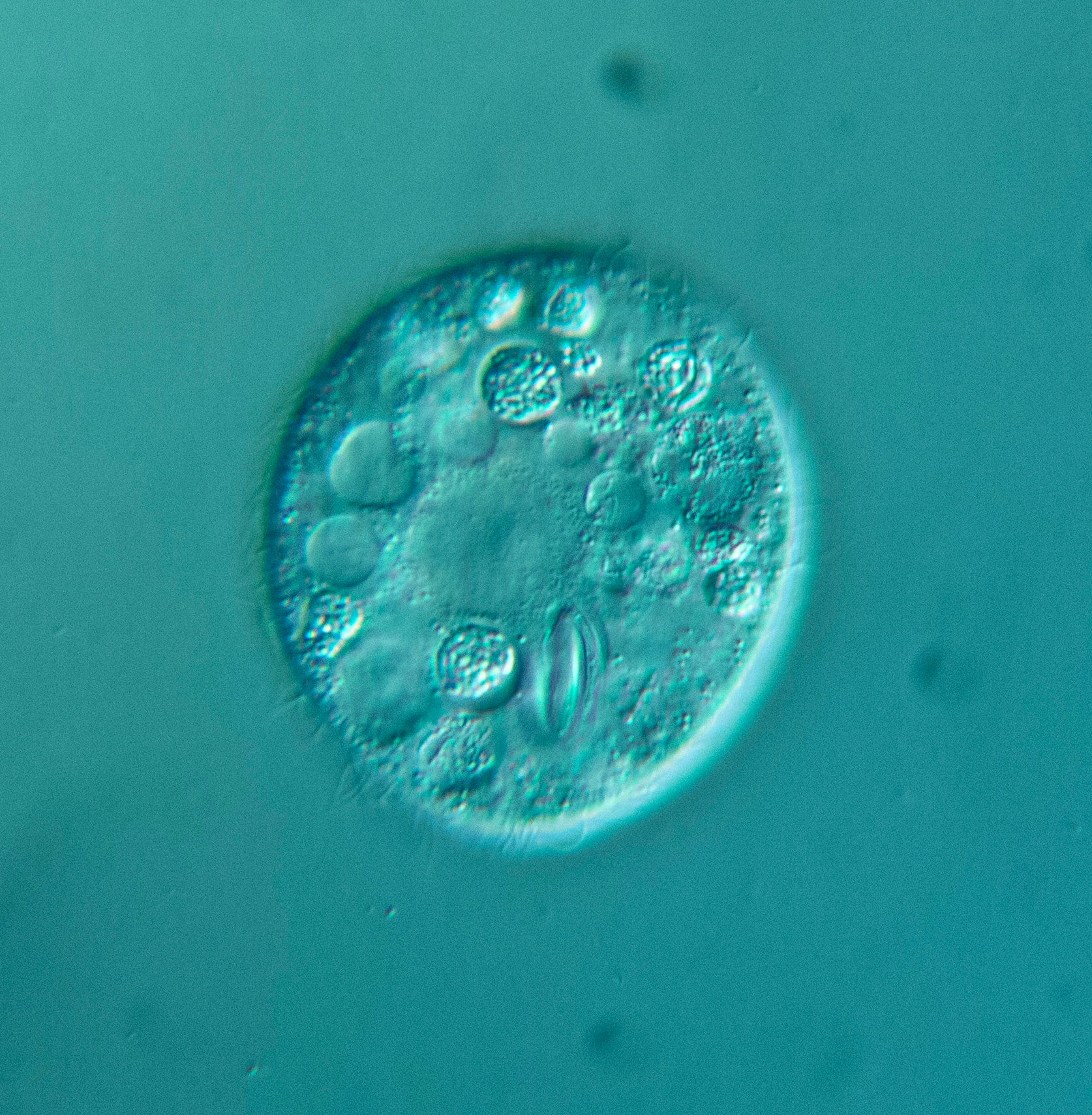
- Glaucoma scintillans

Scientific classification
- Domain: Eukaryota
- Clade: Sar
- Clade: Alveolata
- Phylum: Ciliophora
- Class: Oligohymenophorea
- Order: Tetrahymenida
- Family: Glaucomidae
- Genus: Glaucoma; Ehrenberg, 1830

= Glaucoma (ciliate) =

Genus of single-celled organisms

Glaucoma is a genus of freshwater ciliates in the Oligohymenophorea. Cells in this genus are between 30–150 μm long, and have three membranelles (structures formed from multiple modified cilia) that surround the oral cavity. Two of the membranelles are used to sweep water towards the mouth, while the third acts like a sieve to strain out food particles for ingestion. In contrast, many other filter-feeding oligohymenophoreans use the paroral membrane, also known as an undulating membrane, for this purpose, but the paroral is not well-developed in Glaucoma.
