= Lynchellidae =

Scientific classification
- Domain: Eukaryota
- Supergroup: Alveolata
- Phylum: Ciliophora
- Class: Phyllopharyngea
- Order: Chlamydodontida
- Family: Lynchellidae; Jankowski, 1968

Genus
- Atopochilodon; Chlamydonella; Chlamydonellopsis; Coeloperix; Lynchella

Family of single-celled organisms

12 Lynchella aspidisciformis 16 Lynchella gradata

Lynchellidae is a family of marine ciliates first described in 1968.
