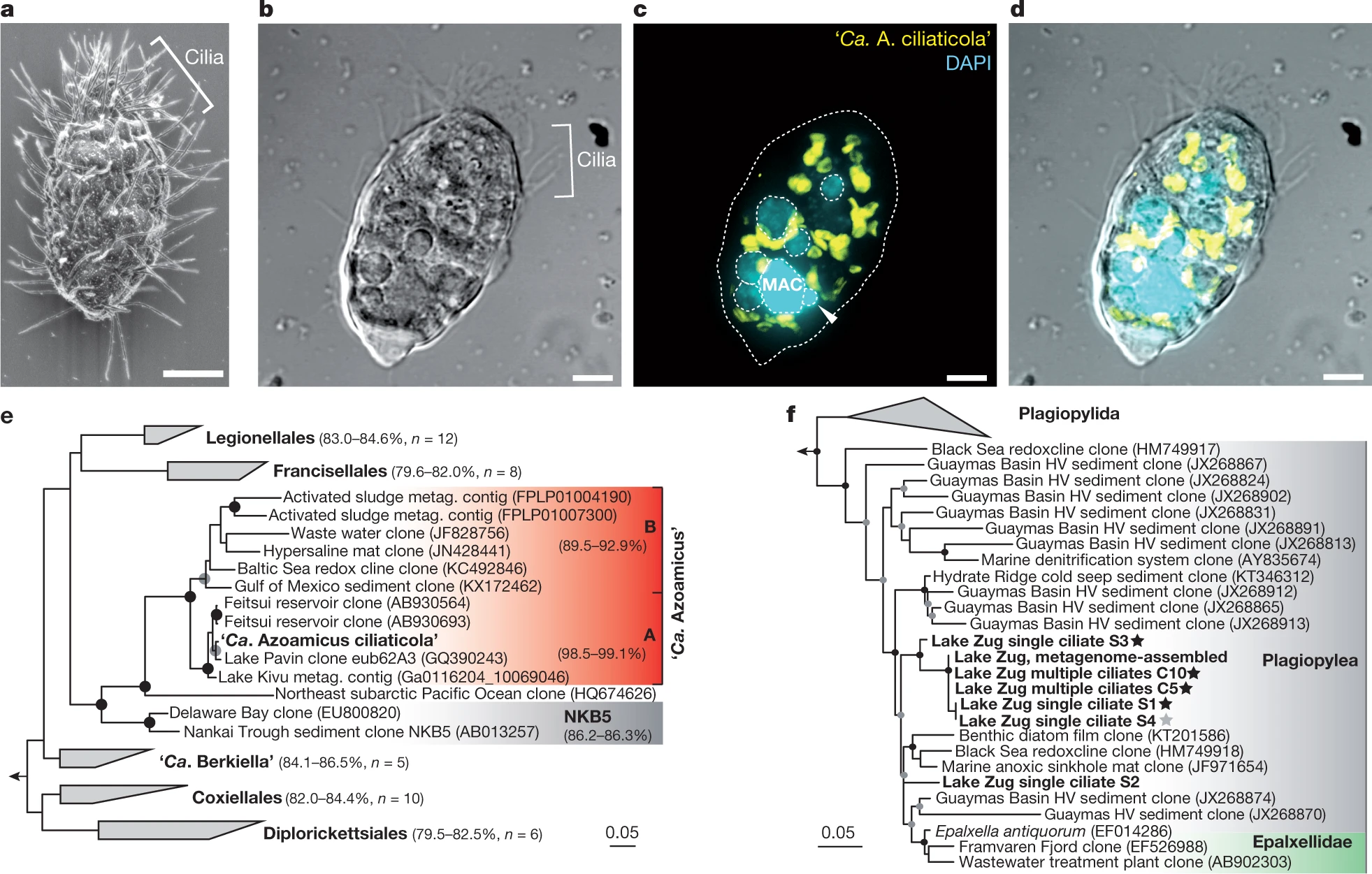

Scientific classification (Candidatus)
- Domain: Bacteria
- Phylum: Pseudomonadota
- Class: Gammaproteobacteria
- Order: incertae sedis
- Family: incertae sedis
- Genus: "Candidatus Azoamicus" Graf et al. 2021
- Species: "Ca. A. ciliaticola"

Binomial name
- "Candidatus Azoamicus ciliaticola" Graf et al. 2021

= Azoamicus =

"Candidatus Azoamicus ciliaticola"

Species of bacterium

"Candidatus Azoamicus ciliaticola" is a candidate species of endosymbiotic bacteria belonging to the eub62A3 group of Gammaproteobacteria, characterized for its capacity to perform denitrification within its ciliate host in anaerobic water environments. It was isolated from Lake Zug in Switzerland and described in 2021.

== Ecology ==
"Ca. A. ciliaticola" is an obligate endosymbiont of an anaerobic freshwater ciliate from the class Plagiopylea. The endosymbiont possesses a highly reduced genome of 0.29 Mbp, with a substantial fraction of its genes dedicated to energy production. "Ca. A. ciliaticola" contains a complete gene set for denitrification and is thus the first observed obligate endosymbiont with such a pathway.

Extensive genetic potential for energy metabolism hints that the main function of the endosymbiont is to generate ATP and provide it to its ciliate host. Ca. A. ciliaticola thus has functions which are similar to mitochondria, although it is not derived from a mitochondrial line of descent.

It provokes the question of whether some other eukaryota are using Prokaryotes to transfer electrons to non-canonical electron acceptors, such as in the case of denitrification.
