= Ciliate MDS/IES database =

MDS_IES_DB

Content
- Description: Database of macronuclear and micronuclear genes in spirotrichous ciliates.

Contact
- Research center: Princeton University
- Laboratory: Department of Ecology and Evolutionary Biology
- Primary citation: PMID 15608224

Access
- Website: http://oxytricha.princeton.edu/dimorphism/database.htm

In bioinformatics, the Ciliate MDS/IES database is a biological database of spirotrich genes.

== See also ==
- Spirotrich
