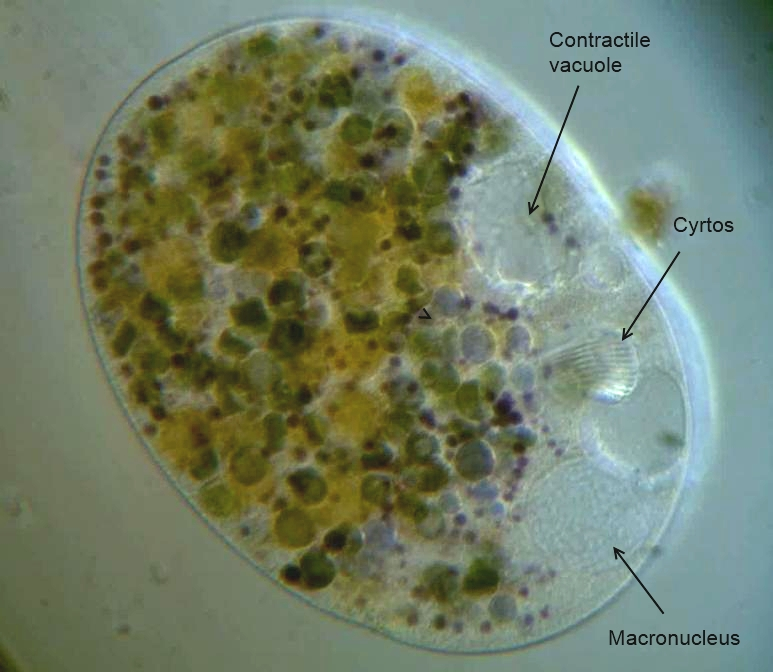
- Nassula sp.

Scientific classification
- Domain: Eukaryota
- Clade: Diaphoretickes
- Clade: SAR
- Clade: Alveolata
- Phylum: Ciliophora
- Subphylum: Intramacronucleata
- Infraphylum: Ventrata
- Class: Nassophorea; Small & Lynn 1981

Orders
- Microthoracida; Nassulida; Synhymeniida

= Nassophorea =

Class of single-celled organisms

The Nassophorea are a class of ciliates. Members are free-living, usually in freshwater but also in marine and soil environments. The mouth is anterior ventral and leads to a curved cytopharynx supported by a prominent palisade of rods or nematodesmata, forming a structure called a cyrtos or nasse, typical of this and a few other classes. When present, extrusomes take the form of fibrous trichocysts. Cilia are usually monokinetids, but vary from order to order.

The Synhymeniida and Nassulida have mostly uniform cilia arising from monokinetids. Among the former, and a few members of the latter, there is a series of small polykinetids running from below the mouth to the left side of the body and sometimes almost circling the cell, called a frange or synhymenium. Other forms only have three oral membranelles, sometimes extending out of the oral cavity, with or without a paroral membrane. These are usually medium in size, sometimes larger, and cylinder shaped.

The Microthoracida typically have three or more oral membranelles, with at least a vestige of the paroral membrane occurring during cell division. The body cilia are sparse, and often arise from dikinetids, with cirrus-like polykinetids occurring in the marine genus Discotricha. These are usually small and ellipsoid or crescent shaped, with the right side of the body curved outward, and generally have a rigid pellicle.

As first defined by Eugene Small and Denis Lynn in 1981, the Nassophorea also included the peniculids and, in a separate subclass, the hypotrichs. More recent schemes restore these to their earlier positions, leaving this group a relatively small collection of less well-known forms.
