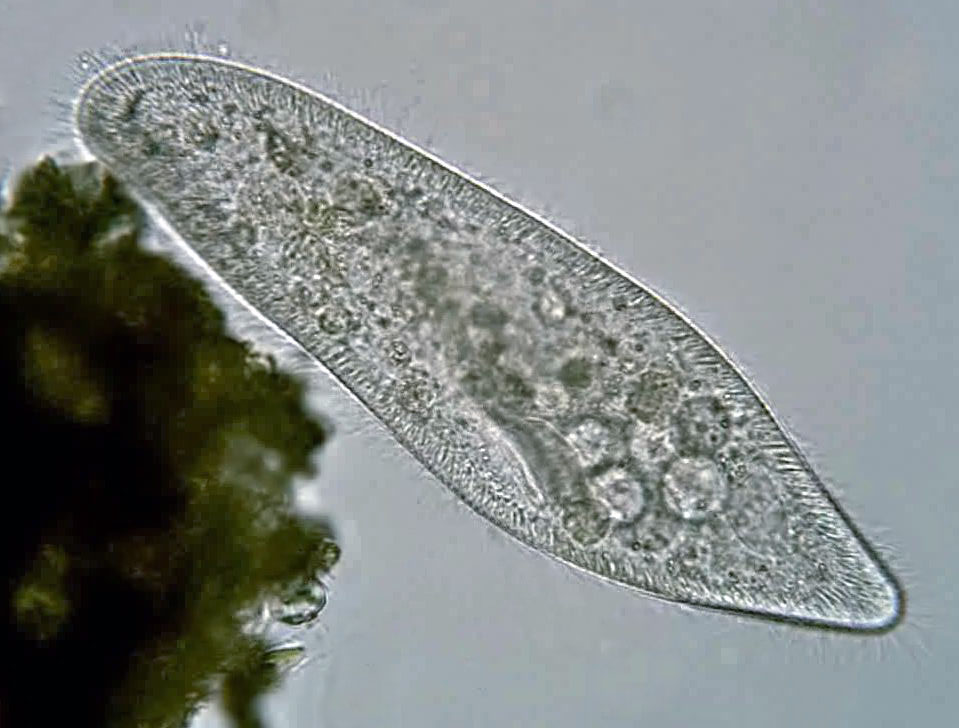
- Paramecium caudatum

Scientific classification
- Domain: Eukaryota
- Clade: Sar
- Clade: Alveolata
- Phylum: Ciliophora
- Subphylum: Intramacronucleata
- Infraphylum: Ventrata; Cavalier-Smith 2004

Classes
- Phyllopharyngea; Colpodea; Nassophorea; Prostomatea; Plagiopylea; Oligohymenophorea

= Ventrata =

Taxon of ciliates

Ventrata is an infraphylum of ciliates inside the subphylum Intramacronucleata that unites the classes Phyllopharyngea, Colpodea, Nassophorea, Prostomatea, Plagiopylea and Oligohymenophorea. It is equivalent to the clade CONthreeP or Conthreep recovered by phylogenetic analyses.

== Description ==
Members of this taxon are characterized by having, ancestrally, a ventral cytopharynx, as the name suggests.

== Phylogeny ==
The monophyly of CONthreeP is well supported, being placed as sister to Protocruziea. The order Discotrichida, belonging to class Nassophorea, has been recovered as the earliest branch of the clade.

- - Protocruziea
  - Ventrata CONthreeP
    - Discotrichida (Nassophorea)
    - - Colpodea
      - - - Nassophorea
          - Phyllopharyngea
        - - Oligohymenophorea
          - - Prostomatea
            - Plagiopylea
