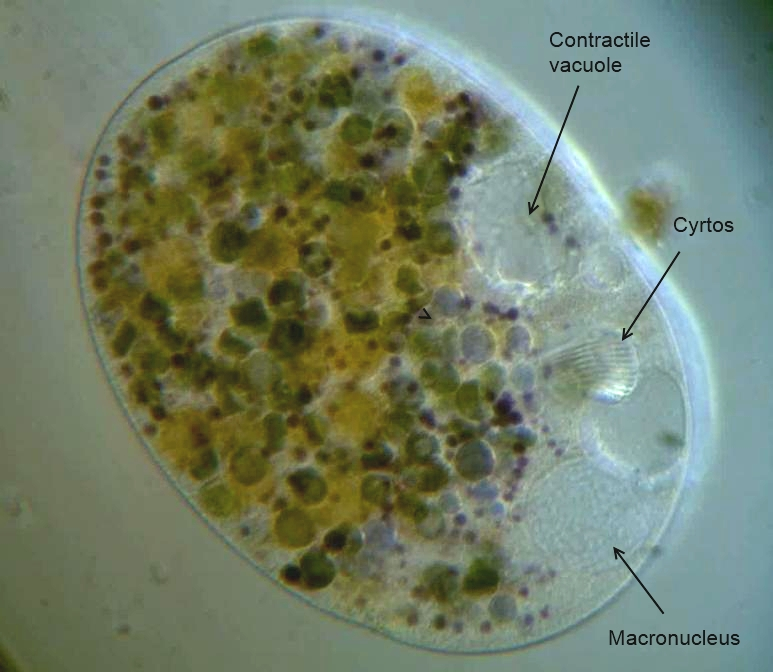
- Nassula sp.

Scientific classification
- Domain: Eukaryota
- Clade: Sar
- Clade: Alveolata
- Phylum: Ciliophora
- Class: Nassophorea
- Order: Nassulida
- Family: Nassulidae de Fromentel, 1874
- Genus: Nassula; Ehrenberg, 1833

= Nassula =

Genus of single-celled organisms

Nassula is a genus of unicellular ciliates, belonging to the class Nassophorea. Like other members of the class, Nassula possesses a basket-like feeding apparatus (nasse, or cyrtos) made up of cytopharyngeal rods (nematodesmata), which are themselves composed of closely packed microtubules. Nassula use this structure to ingest filamentous cyanobacteria, drawing individual strands of blue-green algae through the cytopharynx and into the body of the cell, where they are digested. As the algae are broken down, they can take on a variety of bright colours, which give Nassula a distinctive, variegated appearance under the microscope.

== Description ==
The body is ovoid to elongate, and uniformly ciliated, with a single macronucleus and a partial hypostomial frange (synhymenium) running from the left side of the cell to the oral aperture. When food is scarce, members of the genus have the ability to become dormant by forming a microbial cyst. Excystment can be induced by exposure to a medium inoculated with wild bacteria.

== Reproduction ==
Nassula reproduce asexually, by fission. During reproduction, the cell is divided transversally. As in most ciliates (with the exception of the Karyorelictea) the macronucleus splits, during division, and the micronuclei also undergo mitosis.

While fission is an asexual process, it may be preceded by conjugation, during which compatible mating individuals come together and transfer genetic material across a cytoplasmic link. In conjugation, the micronuclei of each cell undergo meiosis, and haploid micronuclei are then exchanged from one cell to the other. After sexual exchange has occurred, both conjugants will divide by fission.

== Video gallery ==
Nassula cell division

Nassula ornata, showing details of cytopharyngeal basket and macronucleus

Nassula consuming oscillatoria through its cytopharyngeal basket.

Nassula, showing bright colours of partially digested cyanobacteria

== Species list ==
- Nassula ambigua Stein, 1854
- Nassula argentula Kahl, 1930
- Nassula aureola
- Nassula carpathica Lepsi, 1927
- Nassula caudata Ozaki & Yagiu, 1941
- Nassula citrea Kahl, 1931
- Nassula concinna Perty, 1852
- Nassula conica
- Nassula dentata (Dujardin, 1841) Fromentel, 1876
- Nassula depressa
- Nassula derouxi Njine 1979
- Nassula discoidea Dumas, 1929
- Nassula dragescoi Foissner, Agatha & Berger, 2002
- Nassula elongata Dumas, 1930
- Nassula enormis
- Nassula etoschensis Foissner, Agatha & Berger, 2002
- Nassula euglena Dingfelder, 1962
- Nassula exigua Kahl, 1931
- Nassula flava Claparède & Lachmann, 1859
- Nassula gigantea Bullington, 1940
- Nassula gigas
- Nassula granata Foissner, Agatha & Berger, 2002
- Nassula gutturata Gajewskaja, 1927
- Nassula halophila Gurwitsch, 1934
- Nassula hesperidae Entz, 1884
- Nassula lateritia Claparède & Lachmann, 1859
- Nassula leucas
- Nassula longinassa Foissner, 1979
- Nassula longissima Ozaki & Yagiu, 1941
- Nassula magna Smith, 1897
- Nassula microstoma Calkins, 1903
- Nassula microstoma Cohn, 1866
- Nassula microstomata
- Nassula minima Minkiewicz, 1899
- Nassula muscicola Kahl, 1931
- Nassula nahchivanica Alekperov, 1984
- Nassula notata Müller, 1786
- Nassula oblonga Maupas, 1883
- Nassula ornata Ehrenberg, 1834
- Nassula parva Kahl, 1928
- Nassula plantiformis
- Nassula pluvialis Dingfelder, 1962
- Nassula pseudonassula Penard, 1922
- Nassula pusilla Kahl, 1931
- Nassula renalis Ozaki & Yagiu, 1941
- Nassula rostrata Dumas, 1930
- Nassula rotunda Gelei, 1950
- Nassula rubescens Dumas, 1930
- Nassula terminalis Ozaki & Yagiu, 1941
- Nassula terricola Foissner, 1989
- Nassula transpeisonica Löffler, 1979
- Nassula tuberculata Foissner, Agatha & Berger, 2002
- Nassula tumida Maskell, 1887
- Nassula versicolor André, 1916
- Nassula vesiculosaGajewskaja, 1933
