= Multicilia marina =

Scientific classification
- Domain: Eukaryota
- Phylum: Amoebozoa
- Genus: Multicilia
- Species: M. marina

Binomial name
- Multicilia marina Cienkowski, 1881

Species of amoebozoans

Multicilia marina is a flagellated, multi-ciliated, amoeboid protist found in brackish water. It can take on many different morphological characteristics, some dependent on its environment, such as different quantities and orientations of flagella. Leon Cienkowski is credited with the first discovery of this species.

== Taxonomy ==
While some work has been done to determine a more distinct classification above the genus level for M. marina, the placement in Amoebozoa remains.

== Etymology ==
M. marina derives its title from the Latin "marinus," meaning "of the sea", and having multiple cilia.

== Ecology ==
M. marina has been observed interstitially in brackish biotopes, between grains of sand and marine debris. The organism is heterotrophic and feeds on naked amoebae.

== Morphology and behavior ==
M. marina can come in a variety of shapes, which are primarily attributed to the varying salinity of their environments; most are round with between 20 and 30 weak cilia, and they have no polarity. Some tetraflagellar forms can be found, in which there is a central nucleus. In this form, two of the flagella are anterior and functional, while the other two are lateral and have no function. M. marina can also take a biflagellar form, which has locomotion in the direction of the nucleus that can be reversed upon collision with another organism or object.

When five to seven flagella are present, quicker movement is observed than in the biflagellate form. M. marina's flagella are unusually thick and are entirely uncoordinated. This leads to weak, random movements of the cell. The flagellar axoneme has a 9+2 arrangement with single microtubules. The flagella end in a typical kinetosome structure, and the basal component is made up of conical microtubules creating a sheath anchor and a submembrane of inter-kinetosomal fibers. There is some axonemic flagellar loss which causes the weak, uncoordinated movement that the cell displays. The flagellar band is short, and the kinetics are oriented towards the cell surface. With any sharp decrease in salinity, the cell can abandon its typical round shape in favor of a horseshoe shape.

The spherical budding of M. marina can form one giant cell. In all forms, the cell has a plasma membrane and a friable glycocalyx on its surface. The nucleus has a nuclear envelope and pores, and the cytoplasm of the cell is highly vacuolated. Grouped dictyosomes form a perimeter around the interior of the cell, formed by cisternae. There are a few storage granule sites throughout the cell. The cell's mitochondrial cristae are distinctly saccular, and there is no cytosome. The surface of M. marina is covered in pseudopodia used for phagocytic feeding on naked amoebae.

Prey is captured ventrally, and the cell ceases movement and stays motionless until the prey has been completely absorbed before resuming typical behaviors.

== History of knowledge and taxonomy ==
M. marina was first isolated by Leon Cienkowski in 1880 in the White Sea, where it has since been found numerous times, and then by Mylnikov in a brackish biotope of the Baltic Sea. It has been isolated in more recent years in the brackish waters of the Gulf Coast.

M. marina formerly had the classification as a distinct phylum Multiflagellata or lobose amoebae. It is now known that M. marina is an amoeba, branching at the base of Conosea. In 1881, Cienkowski proposed that M. marina lie somewhere between flagellates and heliozoans, based on morphological characteristics. In 1954, Kudo proposed that they were a part of the order Rhizomastigina. From 1996 to 1998, the discovery and documentation of flagellar differences between members of Rhizomastigina and Multicilia marina led to the creation of a new phylum: Multiflagellata. From 1998 into the early 2000s, Cavalier-Smith placed M. marina in the phylum Amoebozoa, claiming that the genus was related to Archamedae and Vanellidae.

No related taxa or ancestors can be identified based on current research. Species within the genus Multicilia include marine Multiciliate marina, discovered by Leon Cienkowski in 1881, and Multiciliate palustris, discovered by Penard in 1903. Some suggest that M. lacustris, discovered by Lauterborn in 1895, maybe a qualifying species, but it has yet to be proven because of a lack of specific data.
