= Anal pore =

Anatomic structure in protozoology and zoology

Labelled diagram of ciliate with highlighted cytoproct (anal pore)

The anal pore or cytoproct is a structure in various single-celled eukaryotes where waste is ejected after the nutrients from food have been absorbed into the cytoplasm.

In ciliates, the anal pore (cytopyge) and cytostome are the only regions of the pellicle that are not covered by ridges, cilia or rigid covering. They serve as analogues of, respectively, the anus and mouth of multicellular organisms. The cytopyge's thin membrane allows vacuoles to be merged into the cell wall and emptied.

== Location ==
The anal pore is an exterior opening of microscopic organisms through which undigested food waste, water, or gas are expelled from the body. The anal pore is located on the ventral surface, usually in the posterior half of the cell. The anal pore itself is actually a structure made up of two components: piles of fibres, and microtubules.

This structure is found in different unicellular eukaryotes like paramecium organelles.

== Function ==
Digested nutrients from the vacuole pass into the cytoplasm, making the vacuole shrink and moves to the anal pore, where it ruptures to release the waste content to the environment outside of the cell. The cytoproct is used for the excretion of indigestible debris contained in the food vacuoles.

Most microorganisms possess an anal pore for excretion, usually in the form of an opening on the pellicle to eject out indigestible debris. The opening and closing of the cytoproct resemble a reversible ring of tissue fusion occurring between the inner and outer layers located at the aboral end. An anal pore is not a permanently visible structure; it appears at the time of defecation and then disappears afterward.

In paramecium, the anal pore is a region of pellicle that is not covered by ridges and cilia, and the area has thin pellicles that allow the vacuoles to be merged into the cell surface to be emptied.

In ciliates, the anal cytostomes and cytopyge pore regions are not covered by either ridges or cilia or hard coatings like the other parts of the organism. As a food vacuole approaches the cytoproct region it actually starts to flatten out the surrounding cells, and a thin-membrane vacuole allows it to be combined in the cell wall. Once the vacuole attaches to the plasma membrane of the cell wall, the vacuole is emptied. The waste excreted by the cell can come as a membrane-bound packaged ball, or as a stream of debris behind the organism.

Directly after secretion of the waste products, deep invagination (deep, canyon-like structure that was the vacuole) is still present. About 10 to 30 seconds after secretion, the vacuole detaches, and a new thin plasma membrane is formed. After a minute has gone by the organism's cytoproct is closed up again and the process is ready to be repeated.

== In marine animals ==
Anatomical diagram of a cydippid comb jelly.

Ctenophores are marine animals which superficially resemble jellyfish, but have biradial symmetry and use eight bands of transverse ciliated plates to swim. All ctenophores possess a pair of small anal pores located adjacent to the apical sensory organ which is thought to control osmotic pressure. These pores have sometimes been interpreted as homologous with the anus of bilaterian animals (worms, humans, snails, fish, etc.). Furthermore, they possess a third tissue layer between the endoderm and ectoderm, another characteristic reminiscent of the Bilateria. Ctenophores possess a functional through-gut from which digested waste products and material distributed via the endodermal canals are expelled to the exterior environment through terminal anal pores, which are specialized to control outflow from the branched endodermal canal system. Ctenophores have no true anus; the central canal opens toward the aboral end by two small pores, through which a small amount of egestion can take place.

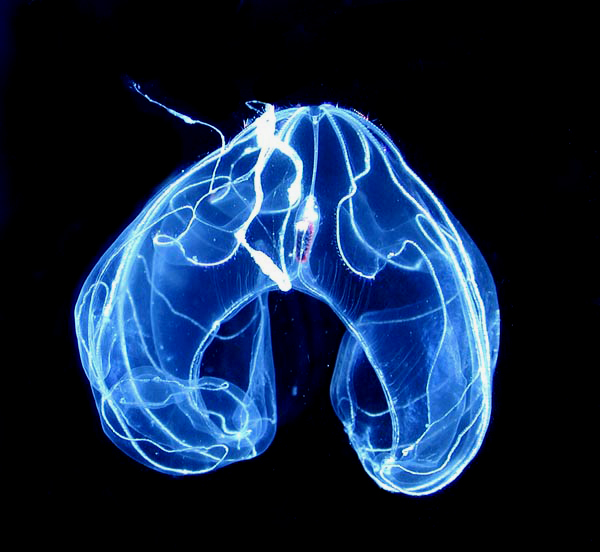
Bathocyroe fosteri with anal pore.

== Bibliography ==
- “Introduction to Ctenophora.” Introduction to the Ctenophora, https://ucmp.berkeley.edu/cnidaria/ctenophora.html.
- Pang, Kevin; Martindale, Mark Q. (December 2008). "Ctenophores". Current Biology. 18 (24): R1119–R1120. Bibcode:2008CBio...18R1119P. doi:10.1016/j.cub.2008.10.004. PMID 19108762.
- Presnell, Jason S.; Vandepas, Lauren E.; Warren, Kaitlyn J.; Swalla, Billie J.; Amemiya, Chris T.; Browne, William E. (October 2016). "The Presence of a Functionally Tripartite Through-Gut in Ctenophora Has Implications for Metazoan Character Trait Evolution". Current Biology. 26 (20): 2814–2820. Bibcode:2016CBio...26.2814P. doi:10.1016/j.cub.2016.08.019. PMID 27568594.
