= Rhynchodia =

Scientific classification
- Domain: Eukaryota
- Clade: Sar
- Superphylum: Alveolata
- Phylum: Ciliophora
- Class: Phyllopharyngea
- Subclass: Rhynchodia; Chatton & Lwoff, 1939

Orders
- Rhynchodida; Hypocomatida

Subclass of single-celled organisms

The Rhynchodia are a subclass of ciliates in the class Phyllopharyngea.
