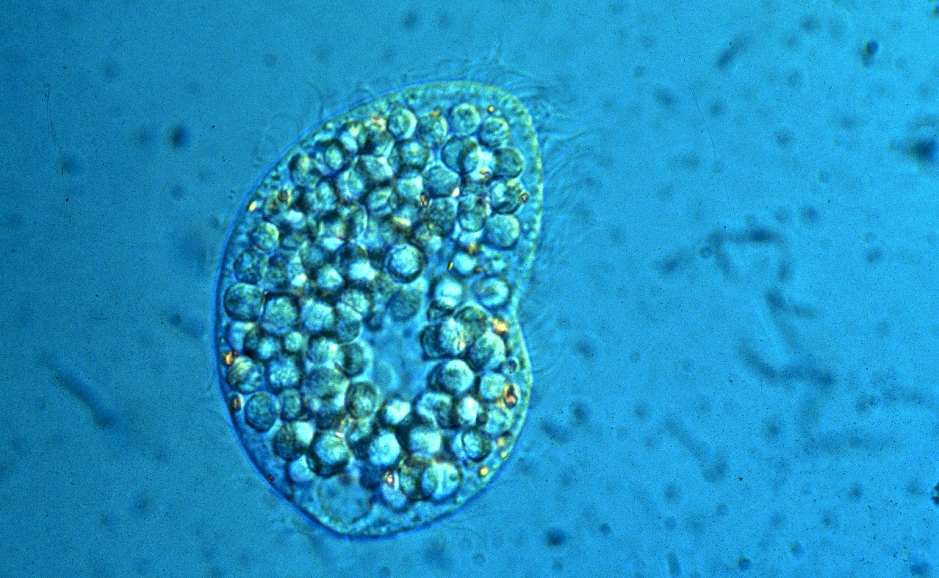
- Colpoda inflata

Scientific classification
- Domain: Eukaryota
- Clade: Sar
- Clade: Alveolata
- Phylum: Ciliophora
- Subphylum: Intramacronucleata
- Infraphylum: Ventrata
- Class: Colpodea; Small & Lynn 1981

Orders
- Bryometopida; Bryophryida; Bursariomorphida; Colpodida; Cyrtolophosida; Sorogenida

= Colpodea =

Class of protists in the ciliates phylum

The Colpodea are a class of ciliates, of about 200 species common in freshwater and soil habitats. The body cilia are typically uniform, and are supported by dikinetids of characteristic structure, with cilia on both kinetosomes. The mouth may be apical or ventral, with more or less prominent associated polykinetids. Many are asymmetrical, the cells twisting sideways and then untwisting again prior to division, which often takes place within cysts. Colpoda, a kidney-shaped ciliate common in organic rich conditions, is representative.

Most ciliates placed here were originally considered advanced trichostomes, on the assumption that they lacked true oral cilia. However the Bursariomorphida, large carnivorous ciliates whose oral cavity forms a deep anterior pocket, were considered heterotrichs because of their prominent oral polykinetids. The modern class was first defined by Small & Lynn in 1981, based mainly on the structure of the body kinetids.
