= Protocruziea =

Scientific classification
- Domain: Eukaryota
- Clade: Sar
- Clade: Alveolata
- Phylum: Ciliophora
- Subphylum: Intramacronucleata
- Class: Protocruziea

Orders
- Protocruziida Jankowski in Small & Lynn, 1985

Synonyms
- Protocruziidia (as a subclass)

Class of single-celled organisms

Protocruziea is a class of ciliates in the subphylum Intramacronucleata.
