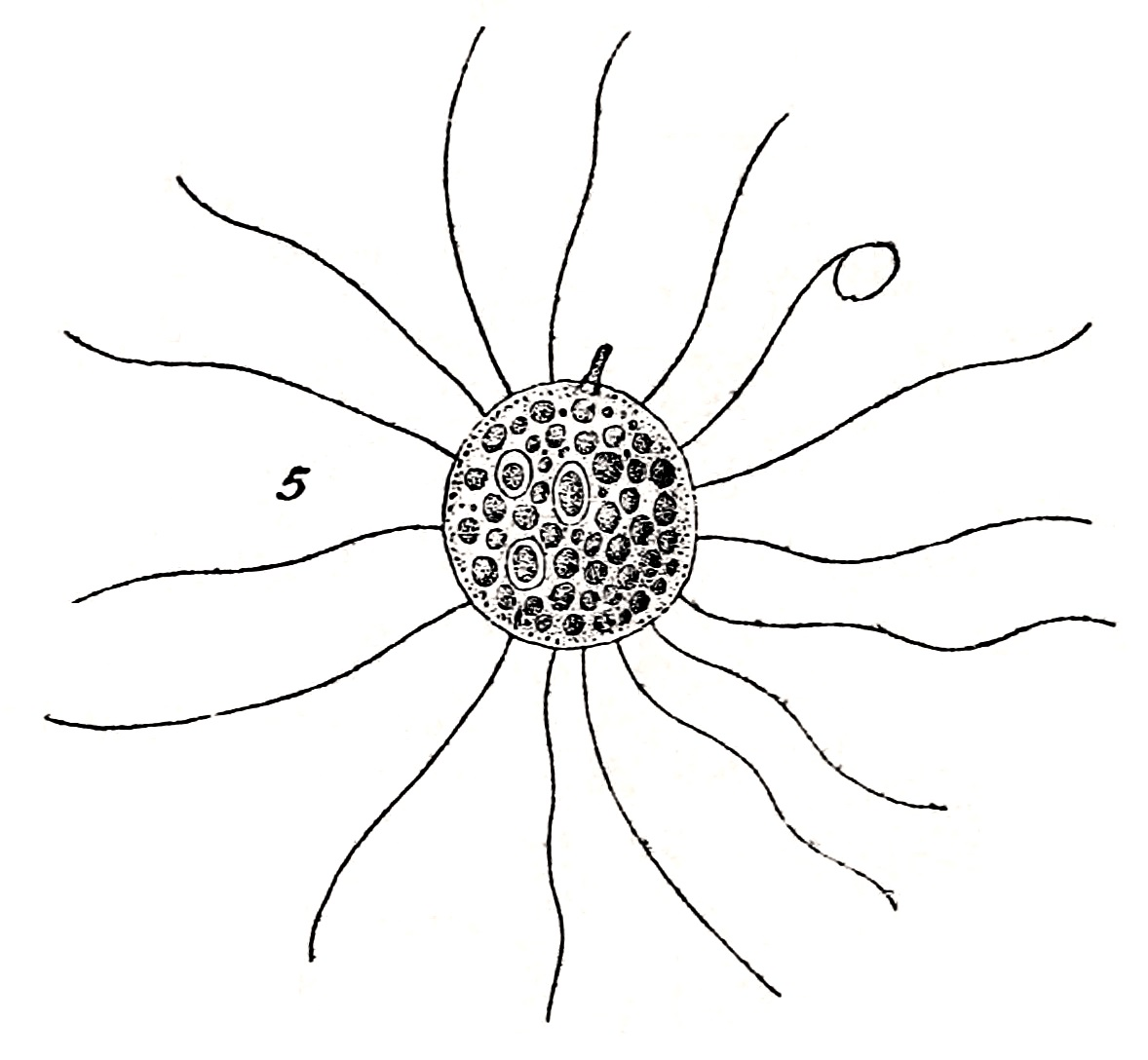
- Multicilia lacustris, fig. 5

Scientific classification
- Domain: Eukaryota
- Phylum: Amoebozoa
- Genus: Multicilia; Cienkowski, 1881

= Multicilia =

Genus of protozoans

Multicilia is a flagellated genus of Amoebozoa.

It includes the species Multicilia marina.
