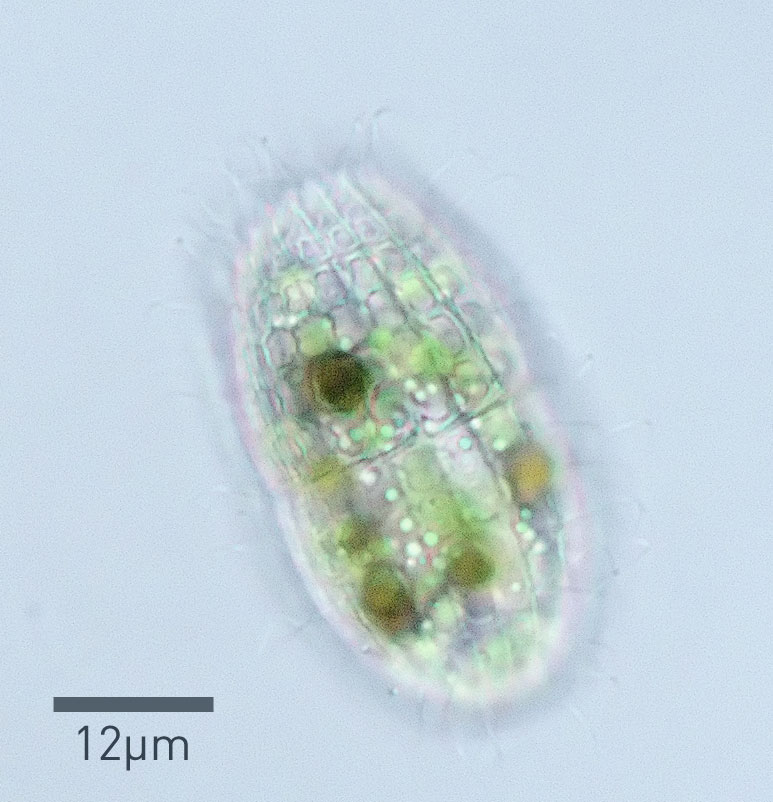
- Coleps sp.

Scientific classification
- Domain: Eukaryota
- Clade: Sar
- Clade: Alveolata
- Phylum: Ciliophora
- Class: Prostomatea
- Order: Prorodontida
- Family: Colepidae
- Genus: Coleps; Nitzsch, 1827

= Coleps =

Genus of single-celled organisms

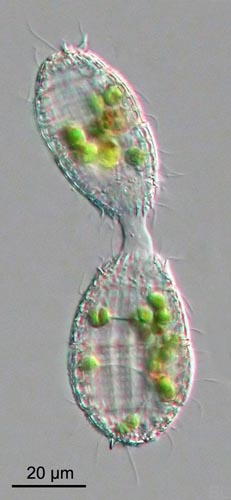
Conjugation of two Coleps sp. Two similar-looking but sexually distinct partners connected at their front ends exchange genetic material via a plasma bridge.

Coleps is a genus of ciliates in the class Prostomatea with barrel-shaped bodies surrounded by regularly arranged plates composed of calcium carbonate.

== Description ==
Species of Coleps can grow up to 250 μm in length, but are usually under 100 μm in their longest axis. Coleps can be taxonomically distinguished by the ornamentation of the ectoplasmic plates which make up their test. These plates are located outside alveolar vesicles of the cell cortex, and contain both organic and inorganic components, the latter of which is mostly amorphous calcium carbonate.

=== Predatory behavior ===
Coleps feeds on bacteria, algae, flagellates, living and dead ciliates, animal and plant tissues. Coleps uses toxicysts, which are organelles containing poison that it uses to capture its prey from its oral area. It extrudes tube-like structures to force toxicysts into its prey and wait until its prey becomes paralyzed. These toxicysts, however, takes about 5–10 minutes to be effective on the prey of the Coleps and it separates itself from the prey during this time. If there are numerous Coleps hunting for the same prey, some Coleps will cling to its prey until the toxicysts become effective and fragment the prey, consuming only a few parts.
