= Chonotrich =

Scientific classification
- Domain: Eukaryota
- Clade: Sar
- Clade: Alveolata
- Phylum: Ciliophora
- Class: Phyllopharyngea
- Subclass: Chonotrichia; Wallengren, 1895

Orders
- Cryptogemmida; Exogemmida

Subclass of single-celled organisms

Chonotrichia is a subclass of ciliates of the class Phyllopharyngea. These single-celled organisms are sessile at maturity and usually live on crustaceans as ectosymbionts.
