= Cariacothrix =

Scientific classification
- Domain: Eukaryota
- Clade: Diaphoretickes
- Clade: SAR
- Clade: Alveolata
- Phylum: Ciliophora
- Subphylum: Intramacronucleata
- Class: Cariacotrichea; Orsi et al, 2011
- Order: Cariacotrichida; Orsi et al, 2011
- Family: Cariacotrichidae; Orsi et al, 2011
- Genus: Cariacothrix; Orsi et al, 2011
- Species: C. caudata

Binomial name
- Cariacothrix caudata Orsi et al, 2011

Synonyms
- (Class): Cariotrichea

Monotypic class of ciliate

Cariacothrix is a genus of ciliates in the subphylum Intramacronucleata. It contains only one species, Cariacothrix caudata, and is the only genus in the monotypic family Cariacotrichidae, order Cariacotrichida, and class Cariacotrichea.
