= Plagiopylida =

Scientific classification
- Domain: Eukaryota
- Clade: Sar
- Clade: Alveolata
- Phylum: Ciliophora
- Subphylum: Intramacronucleata
- Infraphylum: Ventrata
- Class: Plagiopylea; Small & Lynn, 1985
- Order: Plagiopylida; Jankowski, 1978

Families
- Plagiopylidae; Sonderiidae; Trimyemidae

Order of single-celled organisms

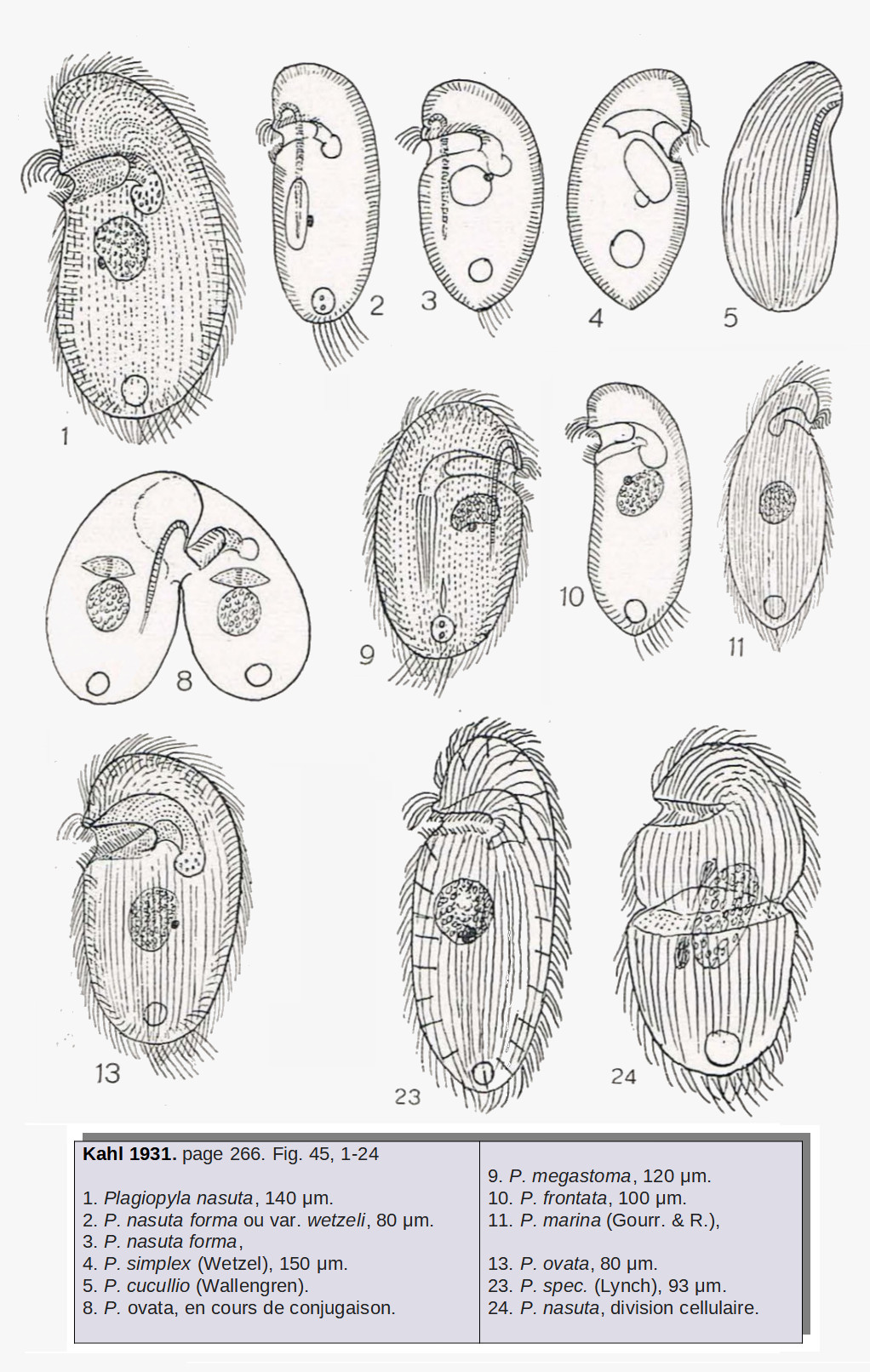
Plagiopyla Stein, 1860 in Kahl 1931

The plagiopylids are a small order of ciliates, including a few forms common in anaerobic habitats.

The body cilia are dense, and arise from monokinetids with an entirely unique ultrastructure; one or two rows of dikinetids run into the oral cavity, which takes the form of a groove, with a deep tube lined by oral cilia leading to the mouth. The order was introduced by Eugen Small and Denis Lynn in 1985, who treated it as a subclass of Oligohymenophorea. Since then they tend to be treated as an independent class, possibly affiliated with the Colpodea. Class Plagiopylea is divided into two clades: one contains members of the order Plagiopylida (like Plagiopyla frontata and Trimyema compressum) and the second clade contains plagiopylean ciliate associated with denitrifying obligate endosymbiont Candidatus Azoamicus ciliaticola.
