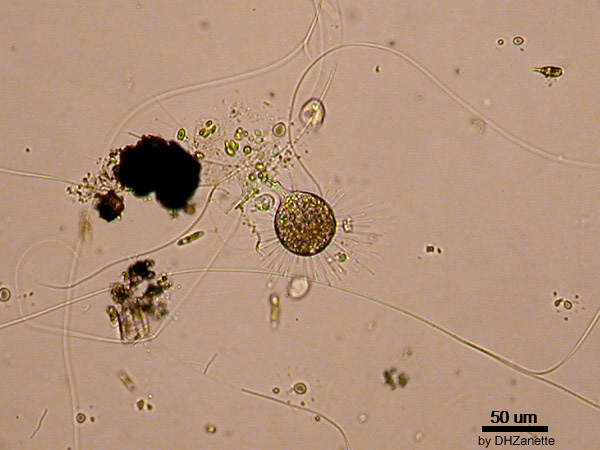

Scientific classification
- Domain: Eukaryota
- Clade: Sar
- Clade: Alveolata
- Phylum: Ciliophora
- Class: Phyllopharyngea
- Subclass: Suctoria; Claparède & Lachmann 1858

Typical orders
- Exogenida; Endogenida; Evaginogenida

= Suctoria =

Subclass of single-celled organisms

Suctoria are ciliates that become sessile in their developed stage and then lose their redundant cilia. They feed by extracellular digestion. They were originally thought to feed by suction – hence their name. In fact, they use specialized microtubules to ensnare and manipulate their prey. They live in both freshwater and marine environments, including some that live on the surface of aquatic animals, and typically feed on other ciliates. Instead of a single cytostome, each cell feeds by means of several specialized tentacles. These are supported by microtubules and phyllae, and have toxic extrusomes called haptocysts at the tip, which they attach to prey. They then suck the prey's cytoplasm directly into a food vacuole inside the cell, where they digest and absorb its contents. Most suctoria are around 15–30 μm in size, with a non-contractile stalk and often a lorica or shell.

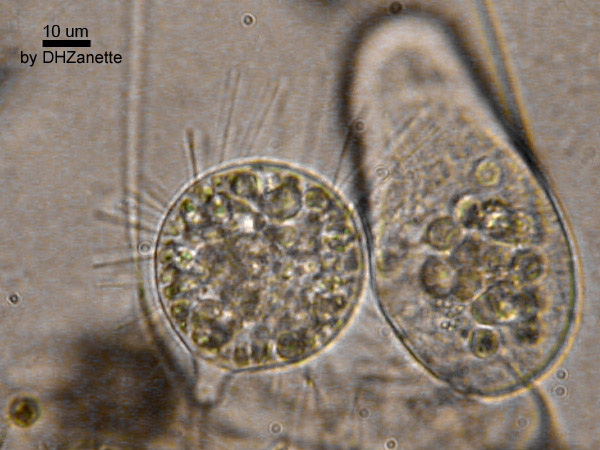
Suctoria sucking a colpidium.

Suctoria reproduce primarily by budding, producing swarmers that lack both tentacles and stalks but have cilia. They may also reproduce through conjugation, which is peculiar in involving cells of different size and often involves total fusion. The way buds form is the primary distinction between different orders of suctoria. Among the Exogenida, including common genera like Podophrya and Sphaerophrya, they appear directly on the cell surface. Among the Endogenida, for instance Tokophrya and Acineta, they form in an internal pouch and escape through an opening—and among the Evaginogenida, they form in a pouch that inverts before they are released.

Once the swarmers have found a place to attach themselves, they quickly develop stalks and tentacles. The cilia are lost, but the underlying infraciliature persists throughout the entire life-cycle. This has a structure that, together with other ultrastructural similarities, places the suctoria within the class Phyllopharyngea.
