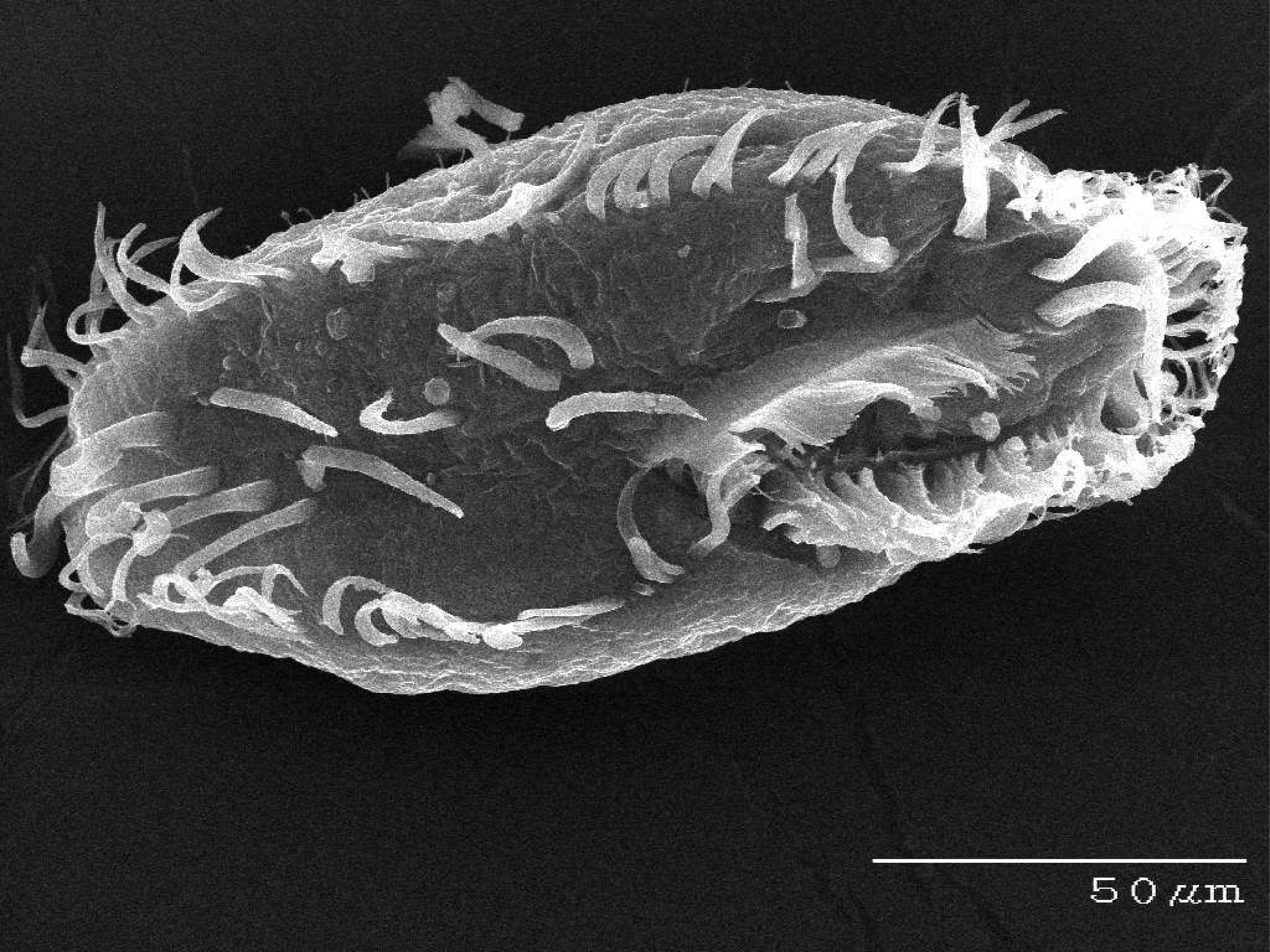
- Oxytricha trifallax

Scientific classification
- Domain: Eukaryota
- Clade: Sar
- Clade: Alveolata
- Phylum: Ciliophora
- Subphylum: Intramacronucleata; Lynn, 1996

Classes
- Armophorea; Litostomatea; Spirotrichea; Cariacotrichea; Odontostomatea; Muranotrichea; Parablepharismea; Protocruziea; Infraphylum Ventrata; Colpodea; Nassophorea; Phyllopharyngea; Prostomatea; Plagiopylea; Oligohymenophorea

= Intramacronucleata =

Subphylum of single-celled organisms

Intramacronucleata is a subphylum of ciliates. The group is characterized by the manner in which division of the macronucleus is accomplished during binary fission of the cell. In ciliates of this subphylum, division of the macronucleus is achieved by the action of microtubules which are assembled inside the macronucleus itself. This is in contrast to heterotrich ciliates of the subphylum Postciliodesmatophora, in which division of the macronucleus relies on microtubules formed outside the macronuclear envelope.
