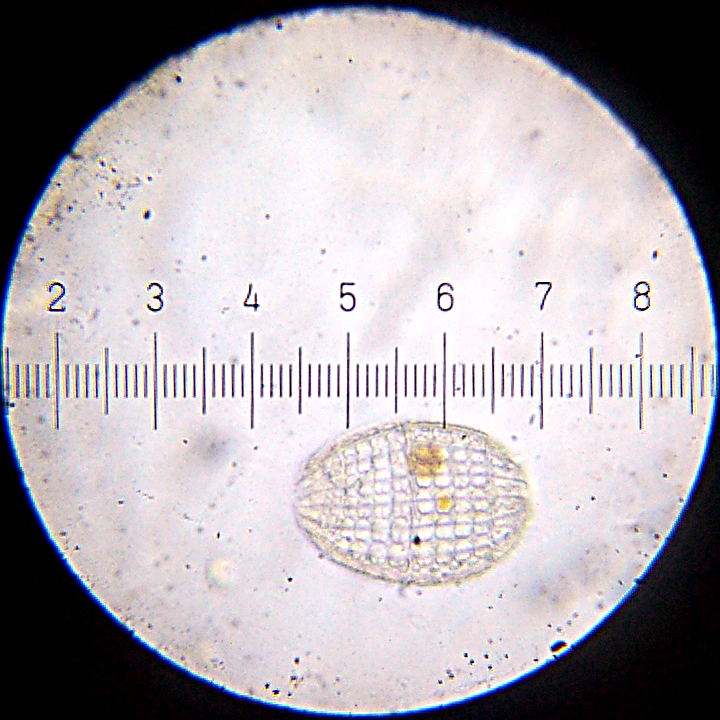
- Coleps

Scientific classification
- Domain: Eukaryota
- Clade: Sar
- Clade: Alveolata
- Phylum: Ciliophora
- Subphylum: Intramacronucleata
- Infraphylum: Ventrata
- Class: Prostomatea

Orders
- Prorodontida; Prostomatida

= Prostomatea =

Class of single-celled organisms

Prostomatea is a class of ciliates. It includes the genera Coleps and Pelagothrix.
