= Spirotrich =

Spirotrich Temporal range: 444–0 Ma
- Euplotes, a spirotrich

Scientific classification
- Domain: Eukaryota
- Clade: Sar
- Superphylum: Alveolata
- Phylum: Ciliophora
- Subphylum: Intramacronucleata
- Infraphylum: Spirotrichia
- Class: Spirotrichea; Bütschli 1889

Subclasses
- Choreotrichia; Euplotia; Hypotrichia; Licnophoria; Oligotrichia; Phacodiniidea; Protohypotrichia

Class of single-celled organisms

The spirotrichs are a large and diverse group of ciliate protozoa. They typically have prominent oral cilia in the form of a series of polykinetids, called the adoral zone of membranelles, beginning anterior to the oral cavity and running down to the left side of the mouth. There may also be one or two paroral membranes on its right side. The body cilia are fused to form polykinetids called cirri in some, and are sparse to absent in others.

Forms with cirri are common throughout soil, freshwater, and marine environments. Individuals tend to be flattened, with cirri confined to the ventral surface. These are variously used for crawling over objects, acting as feet, swimming, or assisting in food capture. They are generally divided into hypotrichs and stichotrichs, but were originally all considered hypotrichs.

Forms with sparse or absent body cilia tend to be smaller and are mostly marine, but a few are common in freshwater. Again, they are generally divided into oligotrichs and choreotrichs, but were originally all considered oligotrichs. The latter group includes the tintinnids, which produce loricae or shells and are the predominant fossil ciliates.

As first defined by Bütschli in 1889 the spirotrichs were one of two orders, together with the now-abandoned holotrichs, and included all ciliates with prominent oral cilia: heterotrichs, hypotrichs, oligotrichs, and peritrichs, although the last were soon separated. The heterotrichs have an adoral zone of membranelles, but molecular and ultrastructure studies have shown they are a separate group that diverged from most other ciliates early on. A few of the smaller groups included with them may be genuine spirotrichs, however, such as the Protocruziida.

The remaining spirotrichs form a monophyletic group, but their relationships are uncertain. For the most part the oligotrichs and choreotrichs appear to form closely related, natural groups. However Halteria and its close relatives, originally considered oligotrichs, form a separate group and may even be modified stichotrichs. Studies also suggest the hypotrichs are paraphyletic to the stichotrichs, and possibly to the oligotrichs and choreotrichs as well. This stands in contrast to the earlier belief that they were the most advanced of all protozoa.

== See also ==
- Ciliate MDS/IES database
