= Membranelle =

Membranelles (also membranellae) are structures found around the mouth, or cytostome, in ciliates. They are typically arranged in series, to form an "adoral zone of membranelles", or AZM, on the left side of the buccal cavity (peristome). The membranelles are made up of kinetosomes arranged in groups to make up polykinetids. The cilia which emerge from these structures appear to be fused and to function as a single membrane, which can be used to sweep particles of food into the cytostome, or for locomotion.
