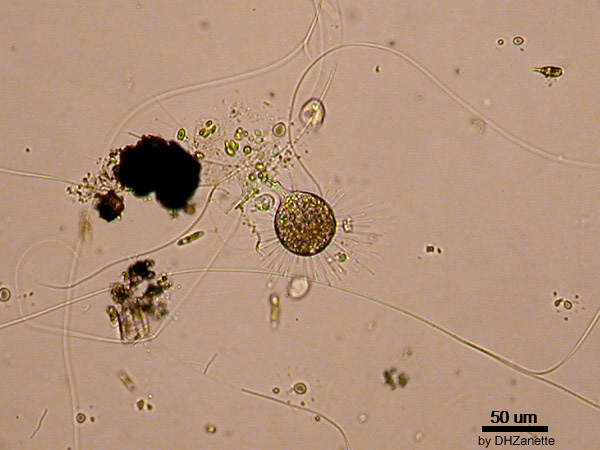
- Suctoria

Scientific classification
- Domain: Eukaryota
- Clade: Sar
- Clade: Alveolata
- Phylum: Ciliophora
- Subphylum: Intramacronucleata
- Infraphylum: Ventrata
- Class: Phyllopharyngea de Puytorac et al. 1974

Typical orders
- Subclass Phyllopharyngia; Chlamydodontida; Dysteriida; Subclass Chonotrichia; Exogemmida; Cryptogemmida; Subclass Rhynchodia; Rhynchodida; Hypocomatida; Subclass Suctoria; Exogenida; Endogenida; Evaginogenida

= Phyllopharyngea =

Class of single-celled organisms

The Phyllopharyngea are a class of ciliates, some of which are extremely specialized. Motile cells typically have cilia restricted to the ventral surface, or some part thereof, arising from monokinetids with a characteristic ultrastructure. In both chonotrichs and suctoria, however, only newly formed cells are motile and the sessile adults have undergone considerable modifications of form and appearance. Chonotrichs, found mainly on crustaceans, are vase-shaped, with cilia restricted to a funnel leading down into the mouth. Mature suctorians lack cilia altogether, and initially were not classified as ciliates.

The mouths of Phyllopharyngea are characteristically surrounded by microtubular ribbons, called phyllae. Nematodesmata, rods found in several other classes of ciliates, occur among the subclass Phyllopharyngia, most of which are free-living. In others, the mouth is often modified to form an extensible tentacle, with toxic extrusomes at the tip. These are especially characteristic of the suctoria, which feed upon other ciliates, and are unique among them in having multiple mouths on each cell. They are also found in many rhynchodids which are mostly parasites of bivalves.
