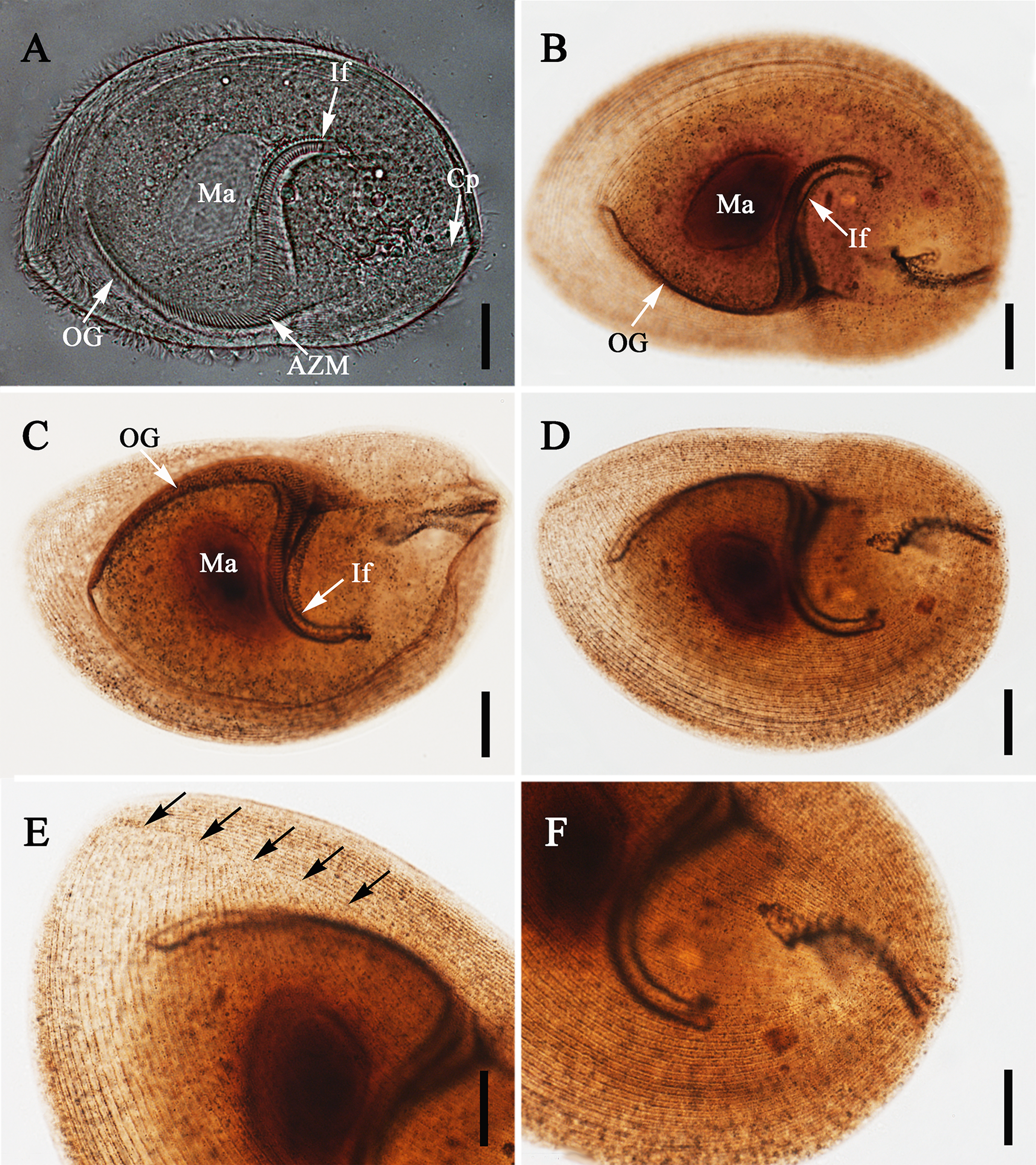
- Sicuophora multigranularis (Clevelandellida)

Scientific classification
- Domain: Eukaryota
- Clade: Sar
- Clade: Alveolata
- Phylum: Ciliophora
- Subphylum: Intramacronucleata
- Class: Armophorea; Lynn, 2004

Orders
- Metopida; Clevelandellida; Armophorida

= Armophorea =

Class of single-celled organisms

Armophorea is a class of ciliates in the subphylum Intramacronucleata. . It was first resolved in 2004 and comprises three orders: Metopida, Clevelandellida, and Armophorida. Previously members of this class were thought to be heterotrichs because of similarities in morphology, most notably a characteristic dense arrangement of cilia surrounding their oral structures. However, the development of genetic tools and subsequent incorporation of DNA sequence information has led to major revisions in the evolutionary relationships of many protists, including ciliates. Metopids, clevelandellids, and armophorids were grouped into this class based on similarities in their small subunit rRNA sequences, making them one of two so-called "riboclasses" of ciliates, however, recent analyses suggest that Armophorida may not be related to the other two orders.

== Etymology ==
The name Armophorea is thought to be derived from the Latin word arma, meaning weapons, or armus, meaning shoulder. This name refers to the caenomorphid members of this class, which have a characteristic military helmet-like morphology, and also a twisted appearance that looks like a shoulder.

== Habitat and ecology ==
Free-living armophoreans live in anoxic or microaerobic habitats, in the sediment or water column where there is reduced or absent oxygen. Thus their distribution is quite limited, although they are found globally in both marine and freshwater habitats, as well as in terrestrial sediment. Clevelandellids live as commensal symbionts inside of the digestive tracts of terrestrial and aquatic animals.

Armophoreans can survive by encystment when in unfavorable environmental conditions. This is quite important for clevelandellids because it facilitates their transmission between hosts.

Like most anaerobic ciliates, armophoreans have mitochondria-derived organelles called hydrogenosomes. These specialized organelles produce energy for the cell in absence of oxygen by the fermentation of pyruvate into acetate and hydrogen. Armophoreans harbor methanogenic endosymbiotic archaea that have been located in the cytoplasm adjacent to their hydrogenosomes. Host cells can contain up to 10,000 methanogens, and they are thought to play roles in host growth and metabolism. It is hypothesized that these symbionts consume the hydrogen that is produced as an end-product of fermentation, making it a more favorable reaction and increasing its energetic yield. Marine armophoreans also harbor ectosymbiotic bacteria that are sulfate reducers, which are thought to play a similar role as the endosymbiotic methanogens in that they also consume hydrogen as a metabolite of host fermentation.

Methanogenesis by these endosymbiotic archaea can contribute substantially to the production of methane in sulfate-rich, anoxic detrital sediments and the anoxic water column, but the contribution is modest (>2%) in sandy sediments where the ciliates are lower in number. This is in contrast to clevelandellids: over 80% of the methane produced by the American cockroach can be attributed to these ciliates via their methanogenic endosymbionts.

== Taxonomy ==
=== Order Clevelandellida (de Puytorac & Grain, 1976) ===
==== Family Clevelandellidae (Kidder, 1938) ====
- Genus Anteclevelandella Pecina & Vďačný 2022
- Genus Clevelandella Kidder, 1938
- Genus Paraclevelandia Kidder, 1937
- Genus Rhynchoclevelandella Pecina & Vďačný 2022

==== Family Nyctotheridae (Amara, 1972) ====
- Genus Nyctotherus Leidy, 1849
