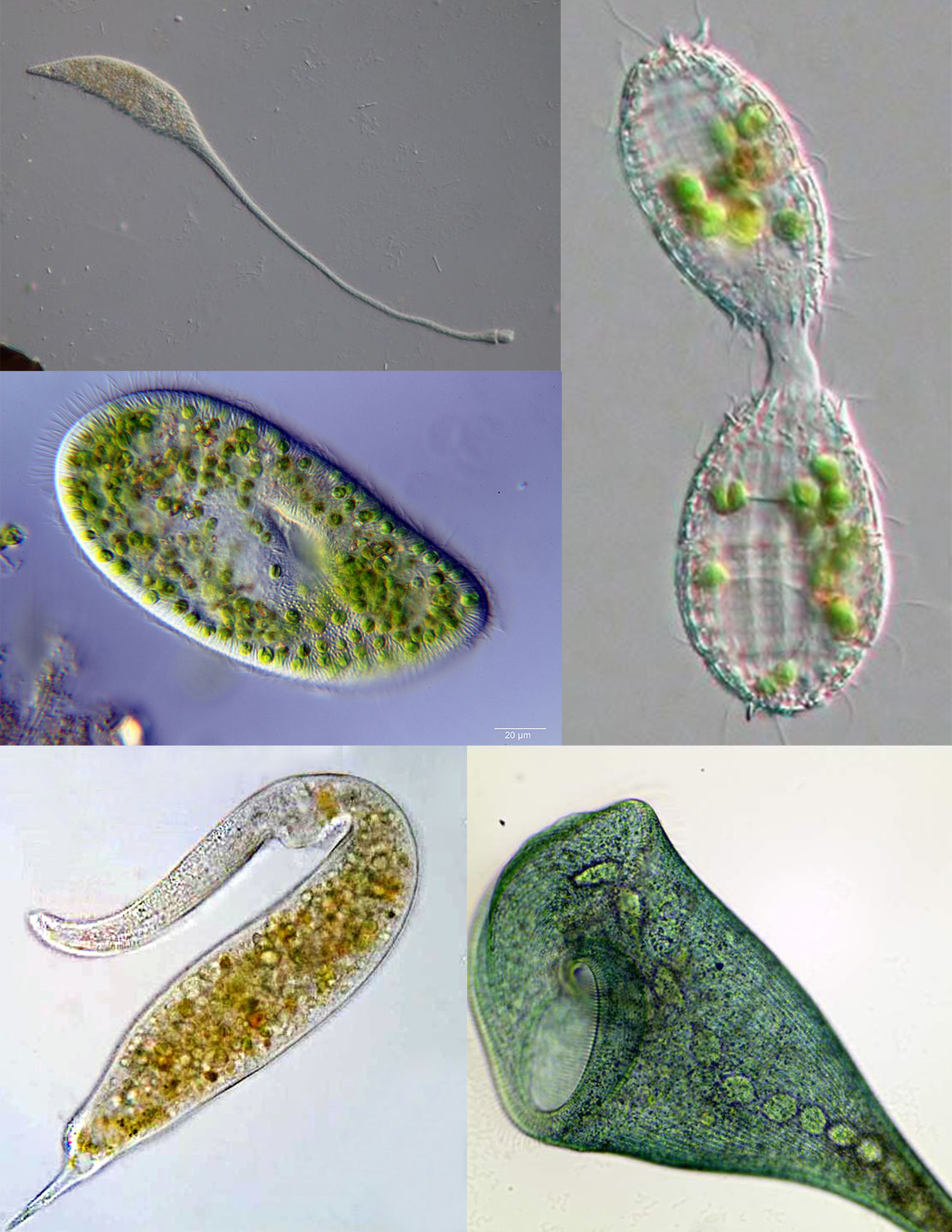
- Some examples of ciliate diversity. Clockwise from top left: Lacrymaria, Coleps, Stentor, Dileptus, Paramecium

Scientific classification
- Domain: Eukaryota
- Supergroup: Alveolata
- Phylum: Ciliophora; Doflein 1901

Subphyla and classes
- Postciliodesmatophora; Heterotrichea; Karyorelictea; Intramacronucleata; Armophorea; Litostomatea; Colpodea; Nassophorea; Phyllopharyngea; Prostomatea; Plagiopylea; Oligohymenophorea; Protocruziea; Spirotrichea; Cariacotrichea; Muranotrichea; Parablepharismea; See text for subclasses.

Synonyms
- Ciliata Perty 1852

= Ciliate =

Ciliate Temporal range: Ediacaran–Recent

Taxon of protozoans with hair-like organelles called cilia

The ciliates are a group of alveolates characterized by the presence of hair-like organelles called cilia, which are identical in structure to eukaryotic flagella, but are in general shorter and present in much larger numbers, with a different undulating pattern than flagella. Cilia occur in all members of the group (although the peculiar Suctoria only have them for part of their life cycle) and are variously used in swimming, crawling, attachment, feeding, and sensation.

Ciliates are an important group of protists, common almost anywhere there is water—in lakes, ponds, oceans, rivers, and wet soils, including anoxic (oxygen-depleted) habitats. About 4,500 unique free-living species have been described, and the potential number of extant species is estimated at 27,000–40,000. Included in this number are many ectosymbiotic and endosymbiotic species, as well as some obligate and opportunistic parasites. Ciliate species range in size from as little as 10 μm in some colpodeans to as much as 4 mm in length in some geleiids, and include some of the most morphologically complex protozoans.

In most systems of taxonomy, "Ciliophora" is ranked as a phylum under any of several kingdoms, including Chromista, Protista or Protozoa. In some older systems of classification, such as the influential taxonomic works of Alfred Kahl, ciliated protozoa are placed within the class "Ciliata" (a term which can also refer to a genus of fish). In the taxonomic scheme endorsed by the International Society of Protistologists, which eliminates formal rank designations such as "phylum" and "class", "Ciliophora" is an unranked taxon within Alveolata.

== Cell structure ==
=== Nuclei ===
Unlike most other eukaryotes, ciliates have two different sorts of nuclei: a tiny, diploid micronucleus (the "generative nucleus", which carries the germline of the cell), and a large, ampliploid macronucleus (the "vegetative nucleus", which takes care of general cell regulation, expressing the phenotype of the organism). The latter is generated from the micronucleus by amplification of the genome and heavy editing. The micronucleus passes its genetic material to offspring, but does not express its genes. The macronucleus provides the small nuclear RNA for vegetative growth.

Division of the macronucleus occurs in most ciliate species, apart from those in class Karyorelictea, whose macronuclei are replaced every time the cell divides. Macronuclear division is accomplished by amitosis, and the segregation of the chromosomes occurs by a process whose mechanism is unknown. After a certain number of generations (200–350, in Paramecium aurelia, and as many as 1,500 in Tetrahymena) the cell shows signs of aging, and the macronuclei must be regenerated from the micronuclei. Usually, this occurs following conjugation, after which a new macronucleus is generated from the post-conjugal micronucleus.

Representation of a ciliate: 1. Cilia; 2. Trichocyst; 3. Alveoli, surface cavities or pits; 4. Contractile vacuole, regulates the quantity of water inside a cell; 5. Contractile vacuole pore; 6. Radial canal; 7. Food vacuoles; 8. Lysosome, holds enzymes; 9. Golgi apparatus; modifies proteins and sends them out of the cell; 10. Micronucleus; 11. Macronucleus, controls non-reproductive cell functions; 12. Vestibulum; 13. Buccal cavity; 14. Quadrulus; 15. Cytostome, cell mouth; 16. Nascent food vacuole; 17. Acidosome, vesicle involved in the acidification of phagocytes; 18. Waste vacuole; 19. Cytoproct, anal pore for waste ejection; 20. Endoplasmic reticulum, the transport network for molecules going to specific parts of the cell; 21. Mitochondrion, creates ATP (energy) for the cell (tubularcristae); 22. Endosymbionts

=== Cytoplasm ===
Food vacuoles are formed through phagocytosis and typically follow a particular path through the cell as their contents are digested and broken down by lysosomes so the substances the vacuole contains are then small enough to diffuse through the membrane of the food vacuole into the cell. Anything left in the food vacuole by the time it reaches the cytoproct (anal pore) is discharged by exocytosis. Most ciliates also have one or more prominent contractile vacuoles, which collect water and expel it from the cell to maintain osmotic pressure, or in some function to maintain ionic balance. In some genera, such as Paramecium, these have a distinctive star shape, with each point being a collecting tube.

=== Specialized structures in ciliates ===
Mostly, body cilia are arranged in mono- and dikinetids, which respectively include one and two kinetosomes (basal bodies), each of which may support a cilium. These are arranged into rows called kineties, which run from the anterior to posterior of the cell. The body and oral kinetids make up the infraciliature, an organization unique to the ciliates and important in their classification, and include various fibrils and microtubules involved in coordinating the cilia. In some forms there are also body polykinetids, for instance, among the spirotrichs where they generally form bristles called cirri.

The infraciliature is one of the main components of the cell cortex. Others are the alveoli, small vesicles under the cell membrane that are packed against it to form a pellicle maintaining the cell's shape, which varies from flexible and contractile to rigid. Numerous mitochondria and extrusomes are also generally present. The presence of alveoli, the structure of the cilia, the form of mitosis and various other details indicate a close relationship between the ciliates, Apicomplexa, and dinoflagellates. These superficially dissimilar groups make up the alveolates.

== Feeding ==
Most ciliates are heterotrophs, feeding on smaller organisms, such as bacteria and algae, and detritus swept into the oral groove (mouth) by modified oral cilia. This usually includes a series of membranelles to the left of the mouth and a paroral membrane to its right, both of which arise from polykinetids, groups of many cilia together with associated structures. The food is moved by the cilia through the mouth pore into the gullet, which forms food vacuoles.

Many species are also mixotrophic, combining phagotrophy and phototrophy through kleptoplasty or symbiosis with photosynthetic microbes.

The ciliate Halteria has been observed to feed on chloroviruses.

Feeding techniques vary considerably, however. Some ciliates are mouthless and feed by absorption (osmotrophy), while others are predatory and feed on other protozoa and in particular on other ciliates. Some ciliates parasitize animals, although only one species, Balantidium coli, is known to cause disease in humans.

== Reproduction and sexual phenomena ==
Most ciliates divide transversally, but other kinds of binary fission occur in some species.

=== Reproduction ===
Ciliates reproduce asexually, by various kinds of fission. During fission, the micronucleus undergoes mitosis and the macronucleus elongates and undergoes amitosis (except among the Karyorelictean ciliates, whose macronuclei do not divide). The cell then divides in two, and each new cell obtains a copy of the micronucleus and the macronucleus.

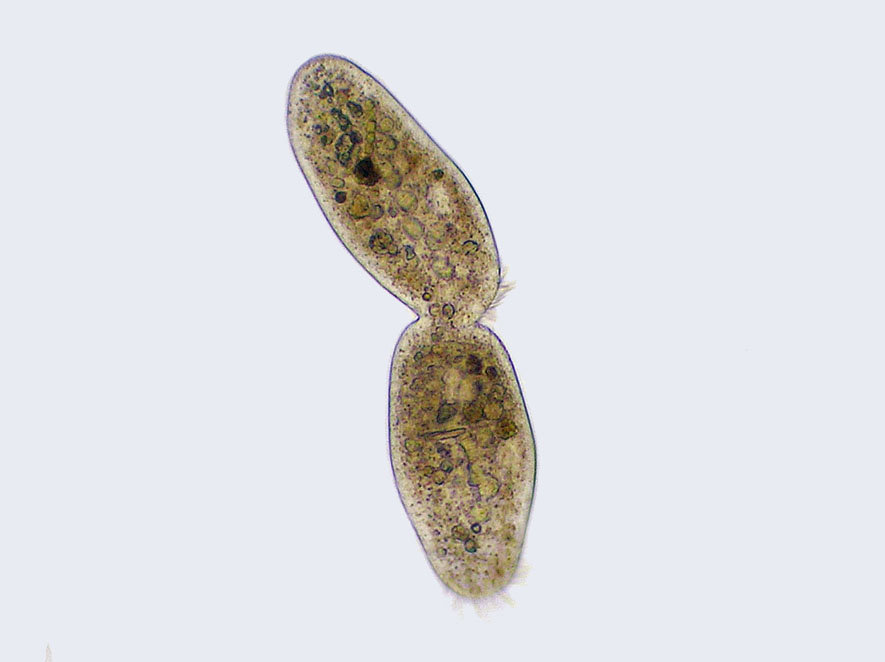
Ciliate undergoing the last processes of binary fission

Division of ciliate Colpidium

Typically, the cell is divided transversally, with the anterior half of the ciliate (the proter) forming one new organism, and the posterior half (the opisthe) forming another. However, other types of fission occur in some ciliate groups. These include budding (the emergence of small ciliated offspring, or "swarmers", from the body of a mature parent); strobilation (multiple divisions along the cell body, producing a chain of new organisms); and palintomy (multiple fissions, usually within a cyst).

Fission may occur spontaneously, as part of the vegetative cell cycle. Alternatively, it may proceed as a result of self-fertilization (autogamy), or it may follow conjugation, a sexual phenomenon in which ciliates of compatible mating types exchange genetic material. While conjugation is sometimes described as a form of reproduction, it is not directly connected with reproductive processes, and does not directly result in an increase in the number of individual ciliates or their progeny.

=== Conjugation ===
Overview

Ciliate conjugation is a sexual phenomenon that results in genetic recombination and nuclear reorganization within the cell. During conjugation, two ciliates of a compatible mating type form a bridge between their cytoplasms. The micronuclei undergo meiosis, the macronuclei disappear, and haploid micronuclei are exchanged over the bridge. In some ciliates (peritrichs, chonotrichs and some suctorians), conjugating cells become permanently fused, and one conjugant is absorbed by the other. In most ciliate groups, however, the cells separate after conjugation, and both form new macronuclei from their micronuclei. Conjugation and autogamy are always followed by fission.

In many ciliates, such as Paramecium, conjugating partners (gamonts) are similar or indistinguishable in size and shape. This is referred to as "isogamontic" conjugation. In some groups, partners are different in size and shape. This is referred to as "anisogamontic" conjugation. In sessile peritrichs, for instance, one sexual partner (the microconjugant) is small and mobile, while the other (macroconjugant) is large and sessile.

Stages of conjugation

Stages of conjugation in Paramecium caudatum

In Paramecium caudatum, the stages of conjugation are as follows (see diagram at right):

1. Compatible mating strains meet and partly fuse
2. The micronuclei undergo meiosis, producing four haploid micronuclei per cell.
3. Three of these micronuclei disintegrate. The fourth undergoes mitosis.
4. The two cells exchange a micronucleus.
5. The cells then separate.
6. The micronuclei in each cell fuse, forming a diploid micronucleus.
7. Mitosis occurs three times, giving rise to eight micronuclei.
8. Four of the new micronuclei transform into macronuclei, and the old macronucleus disintegrates.
9. Binary fission occurs twice, yielding four identical daughter cells.

== DNA rearrangements (gene scrambling) ==
Ciliates contain two types of nuclei: somatic "macronucleus" and the germline "micronucleus". Only the DNA in the micronucleus is passed on during sexual reproduction (conjugation). On the other hand, only the DNA in the macronucleus is actively expressed and results in the phenotype of the organism. Macronuclear DNA is derived from micronuclear DNA by extensive DNA rearrangement and amplification.

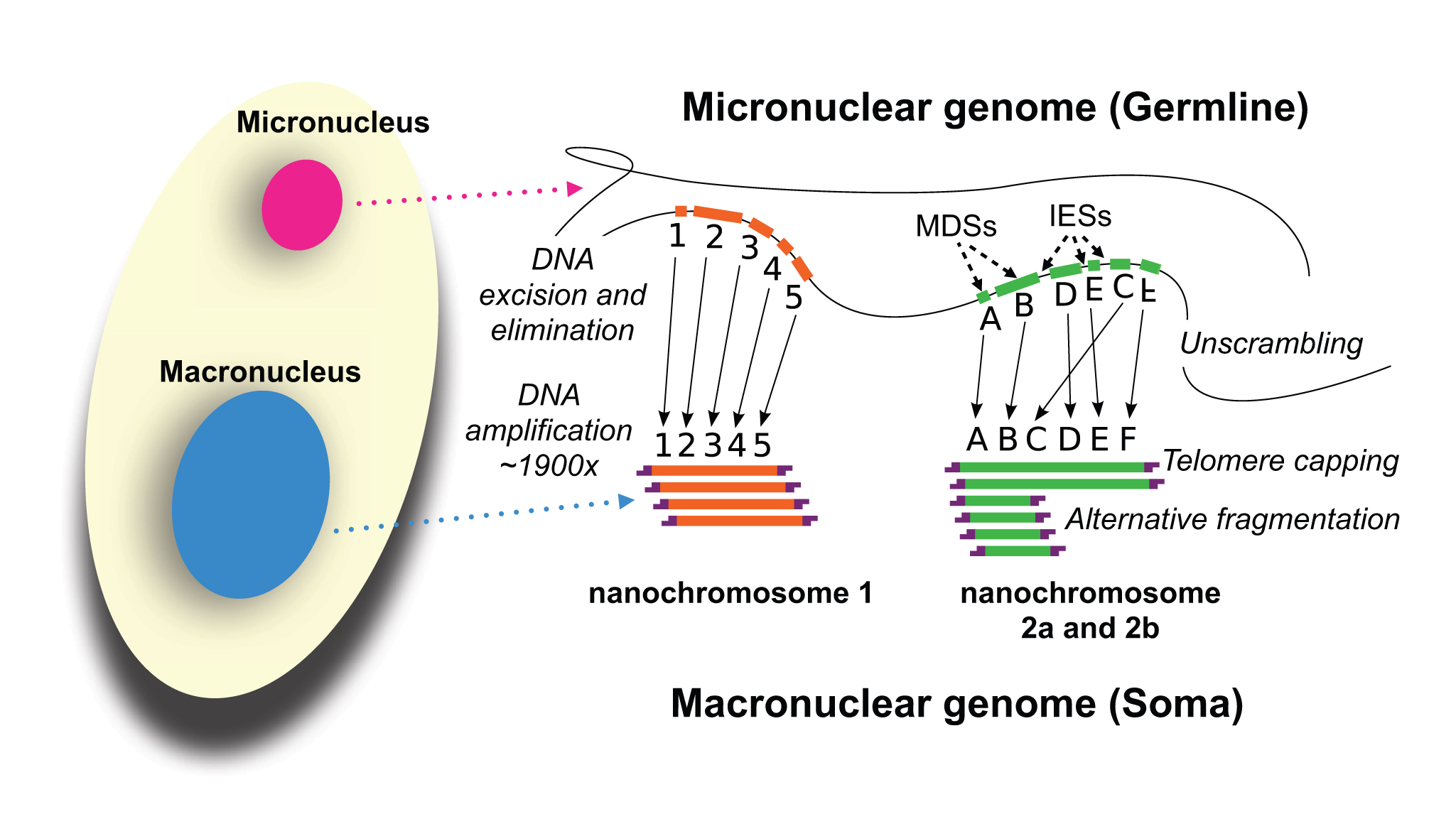
Development of the Oxytricha macronuclear genome from micronuclear genome

The macronucleus begins as a copy of the micronucleus. The micronuclear chromosomes are fragmented into many smaller pieces and amplified to give many copies. The resulting macronuclear chromosomes often contain only a single gene. In Tetrahymena, the micronucleus has 10 chromosomes (five per haploid genome), while the macronucleus has over 20,000 chromosomes.

In addition, the micronuclear genes are interrupted by numerous "internal eliminated sequences" (IESs). During development of the macronucleus, IESs are deleted and the remaining gene segments, macronuclear destined sequences (MDSs), are spliced together to give the operational gene. Tetrahymena has about 6,000 IESs and about 15% of micronuclear DNA is eliminated during this process. The process is guided by small RNAs and epigenetic chromatin marks.

In spirotrich ciliates (such as Oxytricha), the process is even more complex due to "gene scrambling": the MDSs in the micronucleus are often in different order and orientation from that in the macronuclear gene, and so in addition to deletion, DNA inversion and translocation are required for "unscrambling". This process is guided by long RNAs derived from the parental macronucleus. More than 95% of micronuclear DNA is eliminated during spirotrich macronuclear development.

== Aging ==
ln clonal populations of Paramecium, aging occurs over successive generations leading to a gradual loss of vitality, unless the cell line is revitalized by conjugation or autogamy. In Paramecium tetraurelia, the clonally aging line loses vitality and expires after about 200 fissions, if the cell line is not rejuvenated by conjugation or self-fertilization. The basis for clonal aging was clarified by the transplantation experiments of Aufderheide in 1986 who demonstrated that the macronucleus, rather than the cytoplasm, is responsible for clonal aging. Additional experiments by Smith-Sonneborn, Holmes and Holmes, and Gilley and Blackburn demonstrated that, during clonal aging, DNA damage increases dramatically. Thus, DNA damage appears to be the cause of aging in P. tetraurelia.

== Fossil record ==
Until recently, the oldest ciliate fossils known were tintinnids from the Ordovician period. In 2007, Li et al. published a description of fossil ciliates from the Doushantuo Formation, about 580 million years ago, in the Ediacaran period. These included two types of tintinnids and a possible ancestral suctorian. However, a later paper found these to instead be deformed acritarchs. A fossil Vorticella has been discovered inside a leech cocoon from the Triassic period, about 200 million years ago.

== Phylogeny ==
According to the 2016 phylogenetic analysis, Mesodiniea is consistently found as the sister group to all other ciliates. Additionally, two big sub-groups are distinguished inside subphylum Intramacronucleata: SAL (Spirotrichea+Armophorea+Litostomatea) and CONthreeP or Ventrata (Colpodea+Oligohymenophorea+Nassophorea+Phyllopharyngea+Plagiopylea+Prostomatea). The class Protocruziea is found as the sister group to Ventrata/CONthreeP. The class Cariacotrichea was excluded from the analysis, but it was originally established as part of Intramacronucleata.
The odontostomatids were identified in 2018 as its own class Odontostomatea, related to Armophorea.

- Ciliophora
  - Mesodiniea
  - - Postciliodesmatophora
      - Karyorelictea
      - Heterotrichea
    - Intramacronucleata
      - SAL
        - Odontostomatea
        - Armophorea
        - Litostomatea
        - Spirotrichea
      - Cariacotrichea
      - - Protocruziea
        - CONthreeP
          - Discotrichida
          - - Colpodea
            - - - Nassophorea
                - Phyllopharyngea
              - - Oligohymenophorea
                - - Prostomatea
                  - Plagiopylea

== Classification ==
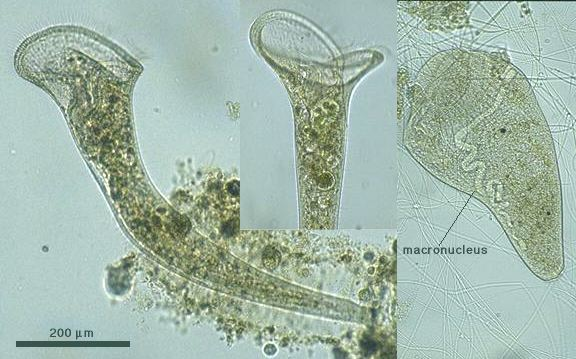
Stentor roeselii

Several different classification schemes have been proposed for the ciliates. The following scheme is based on a molecular phylogenetic analysis of up to four genes from 152 species representing 110 families:

- Class Mesodiniea (e.g. Mesodinium)

=== Subphylum Postciliodesmatophora ===
- Class Heterotrichea (e.g. Stentor)
- Class Karyorelictea

=== Subphylum Intramacronucleata ===
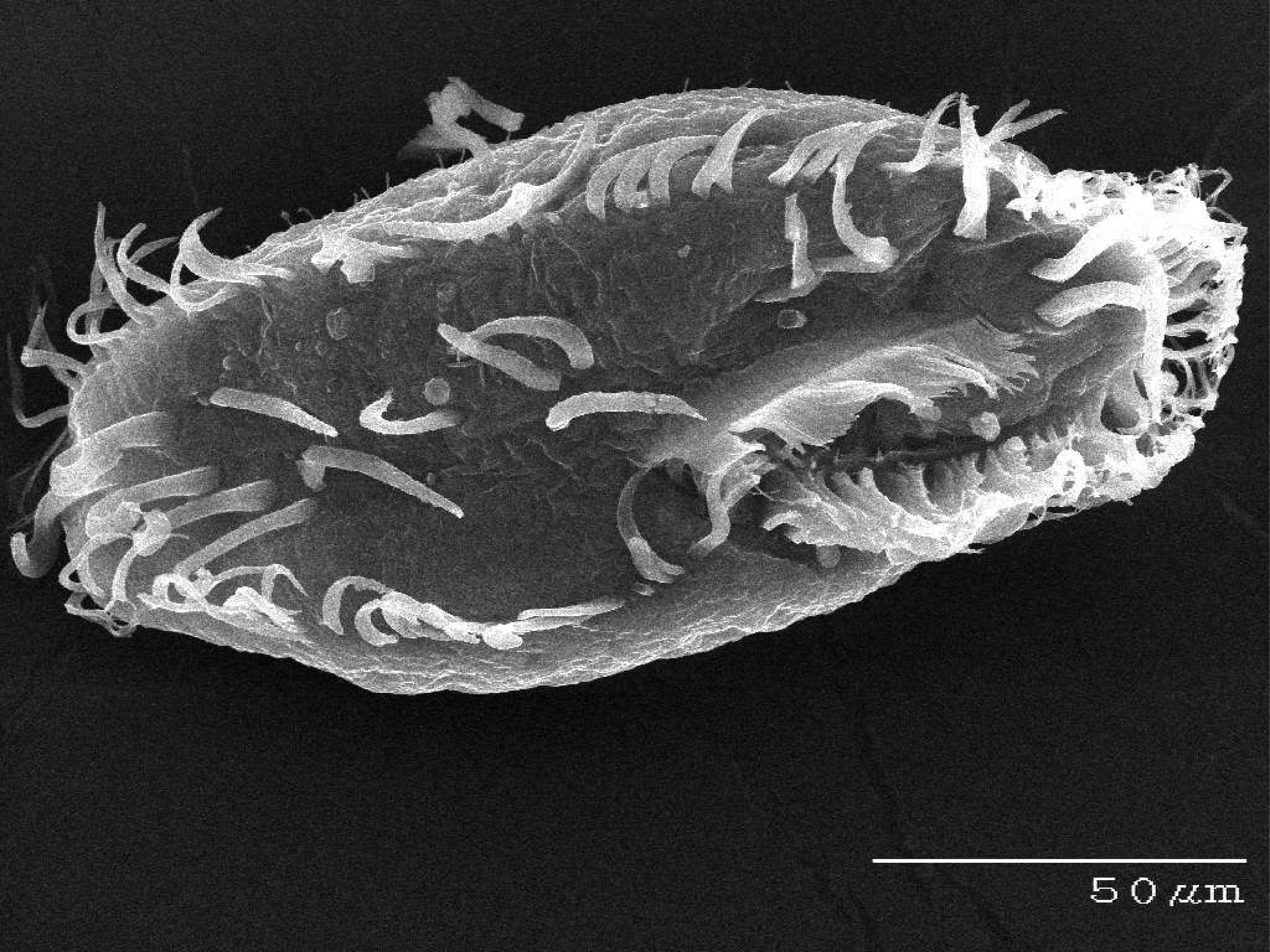
Oxytricha trifallax

- Class Armophorea
- Class Odontostomatea (e.g. Discomorphella, Saprodinium)
- Class Cariacotrichea (only one species, Cariacothrix caudata)
- Class Muranotrichea
- Class Parablepharismea
- Class Colpodea (e.g. Colpoda)
- Class Litostomatea
  - Subclass Haptoria (e.g. Didinium)
  - Subclass Rhynchostomatia
  - Subclass Trichostomatia (e.g. Balantidium)
- Class Nassophorea
- Class Phyllopharyngea
  - Subclass Chonotrichia
  - Subclass Cyrtophoria
  - Subclass Rhynchodia
  - Subclass Suctoria (e.g. Podophyra)
  - Subclass Synhymenia
- Class Oligohymenophorea
  - Subclass Apostomatia
  - Subclass Astomatia
  - Subclass Hymenostomatia (e.g. Tetrahymena)
  - Subclass Peniculia (e.g. Paramecium)
  - Subclass Peritrichia (e.g. Vorticella)
  - Subclass Scuticociliatia
- Class Plagiopylea
- Class Prostomatea (e.g. Coleps)
- Class Protocruziea
- Class Spirotrichea
  - Subclass Choreotrichia
  - Subclass Euplotia
  - Subclass Hypotrichia
  - Subclass Licnophoria
  - Subclass Oligotrichia
  - Subclass Phacodiniidea
  - Subclass Protohypotrichia

=== Other ===
Some old classifications included Opalinidae in the ciliates. The fundamental difference between multiciliate flagellates (e.g., hemimastigids, Stephanopogon, Multicilia, opalines) and ciliates is the presence of macronuclei in ciliates alone.

== Pathogenicity ==
The only member of the ciliate phylum known to be pathogenic to humans is Balantidium coli, which causes the disease balantidiasis. It is not pathogenic to the domestic pig, the primary reservoir of this pathogen.
