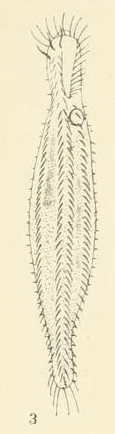

Scientific classification
- Domain: Eukaryota
- Clade: Sar
- Clade: Alveolata
- Phylum: Ciliophora
- Class: Spirotrichea
- Order: Urostylida
- Family: Urostylidae
- Genus: Uroleptus
- Species: U. limnetis

Binomial name
- Uroleptus limnetis Stokes, 1885

= Uroleptus limnetis =

Species of single-celled organism

Uroleptus limnetis is a species of ciliate.

== Description ==
The organism is green coloured, and has a leaf-like shape. Just like Uroleptus musculus, it is U-shaped and has an elongated body with 3 frontals, and 2-4 rows of ventral cirri. It has no transverse cirri, and its "collar" can extend a short distance along the right side of the body.
