= Anteholosticha azerbaijanica =

Scientific classification
- Domain: Eukaryota
- Clade: Sar
- Clade: Alveolata
- Phylum: Ciliophora
- Class: Spirotrichea
- Order: Urostylida
- Family: Holostichidae
- Genus: Anteholosticha
- Species: A. azerbaijanica

Binomial name
- Anteholosticha azerbaijanica (Alekperov & Asadullayeva, 1999)

Synonyms
- Holosticha azerbaijanica Alekperov & Asadullayeva

Species of single-celled organism

Anteholosticha azerbaijanica is a species of hypotrich, a group of protists. It was discovered in Azerbaijan, at the south coast of the Absheron Peninsula. It has three frontal cirri, a slender elongate body 220-300 μm long, with rear portion narrowed tail-like. The body is flattened. The species has been preliminarily assigned to the genus Anteholosticha.
