= Stichotrich =

Historic group of single-celled organisms

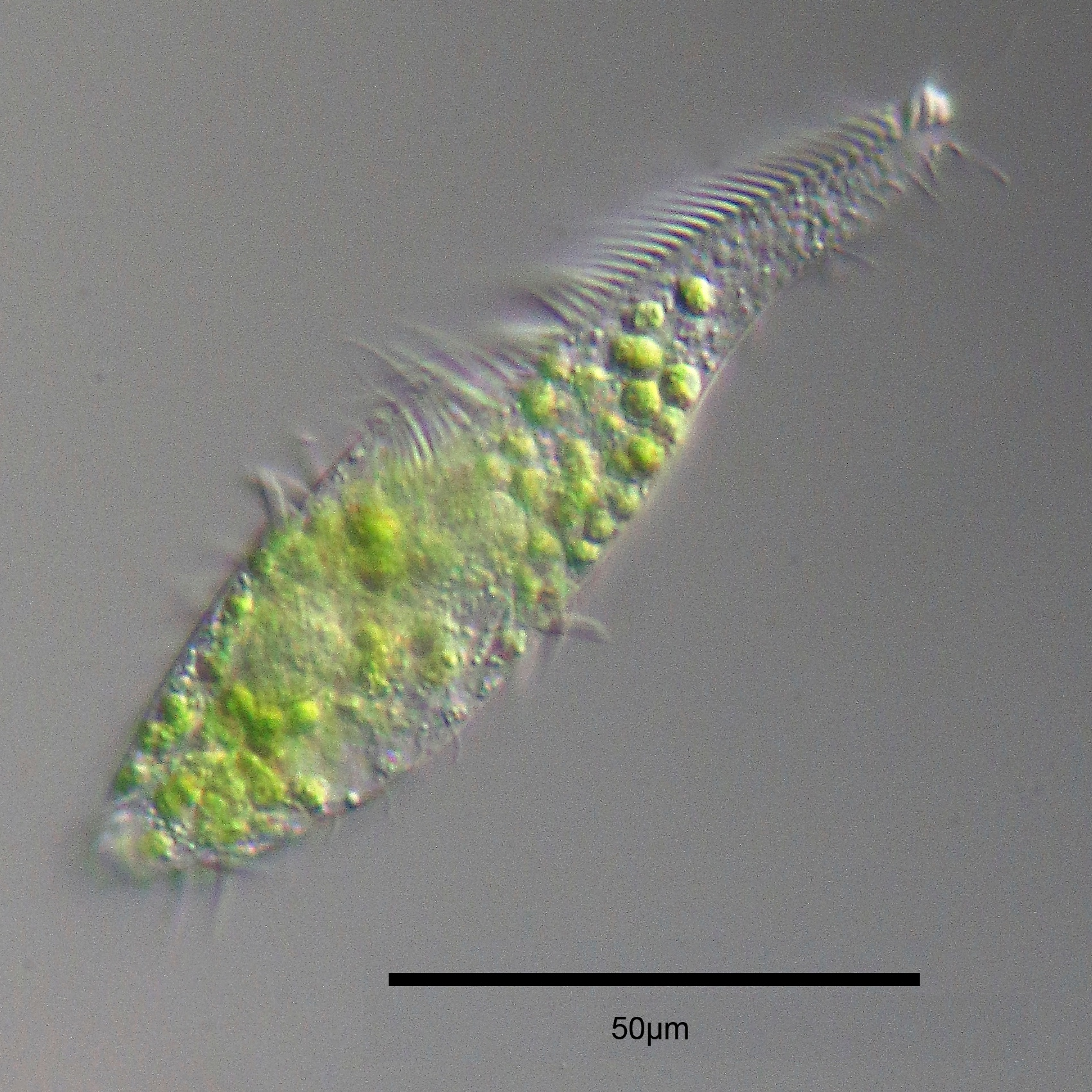
Stichotricha secunda

The stichotrichs were a proposed group of ciliates, in the class Spirotrichea. In a classification system proposed by Eugene Small and Denis Lynn in 1985, Stichotrichia formed a subclass containing four orders: Stichotrichida, Urostylida, Sporadotrichida and Plagiotomida. Although the group was made up of species traditionally classified among the "hypotrichs"—ciliates possessing compound ciliary organelles called cirri—it excluded euplotid ciliates such as Euplotes and Diophrys, which were placed in the subclass Hypotrichia. In later classifications proposed by Denis Lynn, Stichotrichia omits the order Plagiotomida (species in that group were relocated to the order Stichotrichida).

In more recent classifications, members of Stichotrichia, as defined by Small and Lynn., are placed in the subclass Hypotrichia, and euplotid ciliates are placed in the subclass Euplotia.

Like the euplotids, stichotrichs (or hypotrichs, in the sense of Gao et al., 2016) have body cilia fused into cirri, but these are mostly arranged into rows, running along the ventral surface or edges of the cell. Most stichotrichs are flattened and reasonably flexible, although some, such as Stylonychia, have rigid bodies. Characteristic genera include Stylonychia, Oxytricha, Uroleptus and Urostyla.

== Etymology ==
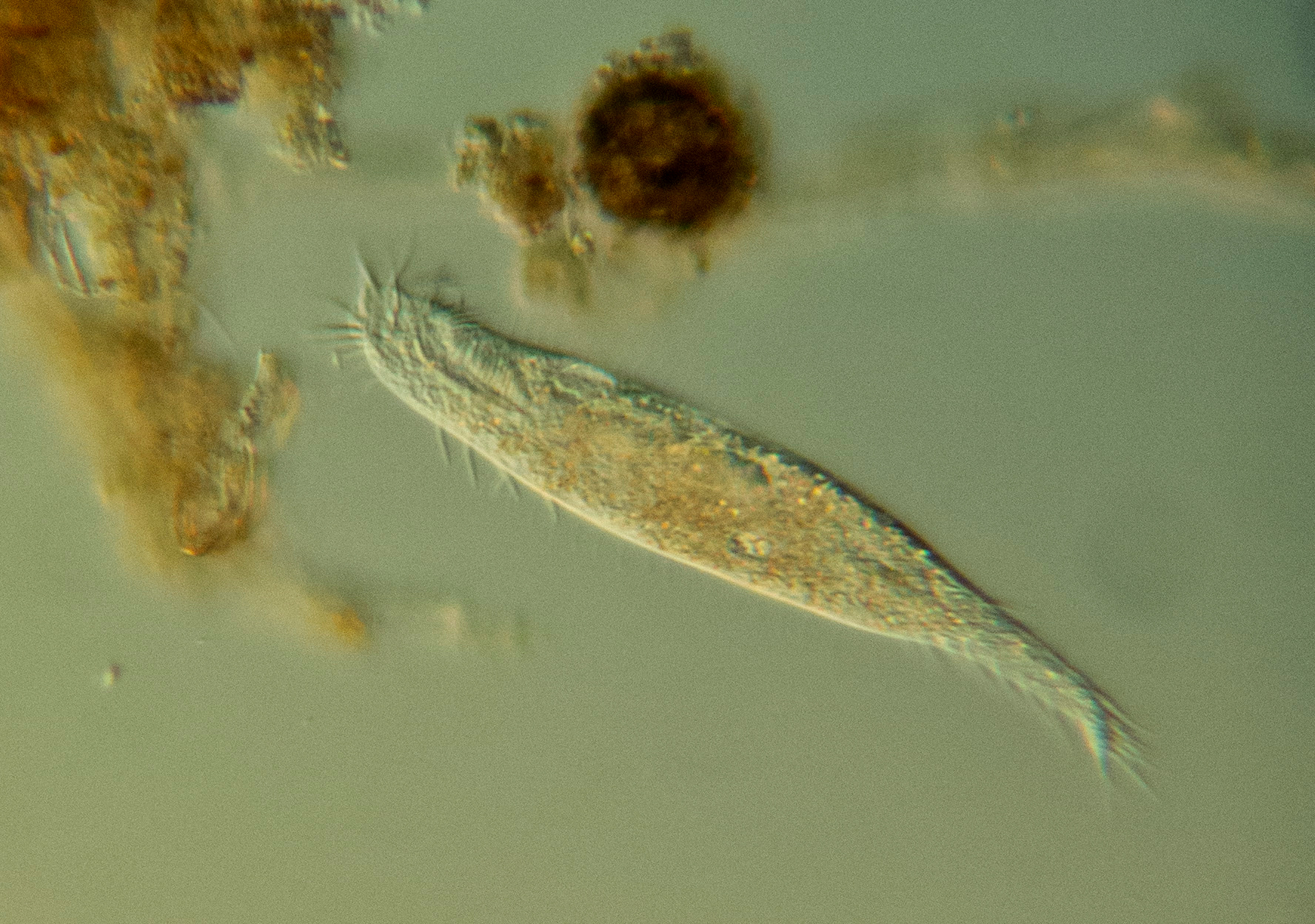
Ciliate Uroleptus piscis categorized in Stichotrichia by Small and Lynn

The term stichotrich derives from the ancient greek στίχος (stíkhos), meaning "row", and θρίξ, τριχός (thríx, trikhós), meaning 'hair', because of the arrangement into rows of the cilia.

== Genomics ==
The draft macronuclear genome of Oxytricha trifallax was published in 2013.
