= Holosticha apodiademata =

Scientific classification
- Domain: Eukaryota
- Clade: Sar
- Clade: Alveolata
- Phylum: Ciliophora
- Class: Spirotrichea
- Order: Urostylida
- Family: Holostichidae
- Genus: Holosticha
- Species: H. apodiademata

Binomial name
- Holosticha apodiademata Wilbert & Song, 2008

Species of single-celled organism

Holosticha apodiademata is a species of littoral ciliates, first found near King George Island.
