= Organisms involved in water purification =

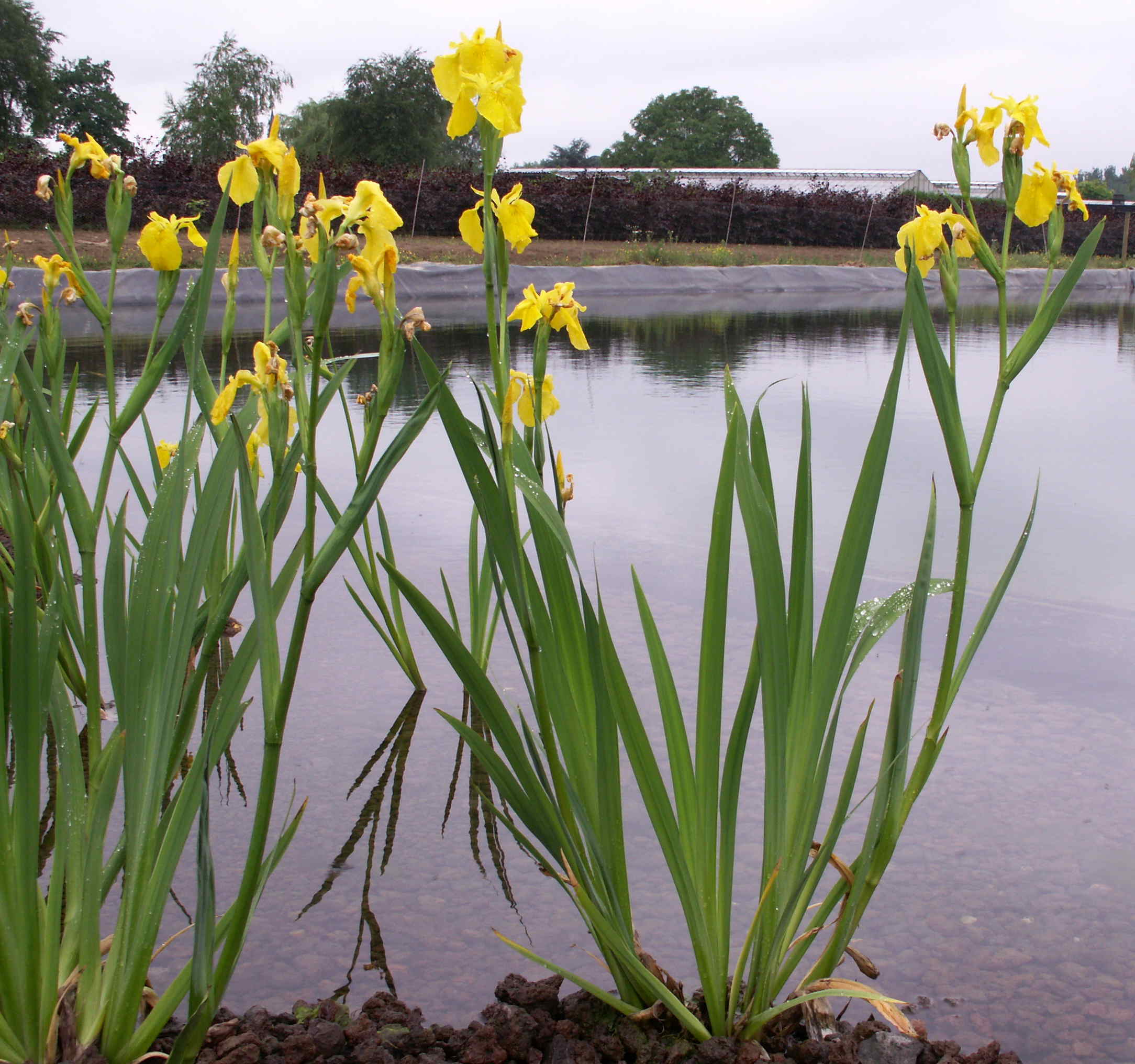
A flowering water-purifying plant (Iris pseudacorus)

Most organisms involved in water purification originate from the waste, wastewater or water stream itself or arrive as resting spore of some form from the atmosphere. In very few cases, mostly associated with constructed wetlands, specific organisms are planted to maximise the efficiency of the process.

== Role of biota ==
Biota are an essential component of most sewage treatment processes and many water purification systems. Most of the organisms involved are derived from the waste, wastewater or water stream itself or from the atmosphere or soil water. However some processes, especially those involved in removing very low concentrations of contaminants, may use engineered eco-systems created by the introduction of specific plants and sometimes animals. Some full scale sewage treatment plants also use constructed wetlands to provide treatment.

== Pollutants in wastewater ==
=== Pathogens ===
Parasites, bacteria and viruses may be injurious to the health of people or livestock ingesting the polluted water. These pathogens may have originated from sewage or from domestic or wild bird or mammal feces. Pathogens may be killed by ingestion by larger organisms, oxidation, infection by phages or irradiation by ultraviolet sunlight unless that sunlight is blocked by plants or suspended solids.

=== Suspended solids ===
Particles of soil or organic matter may be suspended in the water. Such materials may give the water a cloudy or turbid appearance. The anoxic decomposition of some organic materials may give rise to obnoxious or unpleasant smells as sulphur containing compounds are released.

=== Nutrients ===
Compounds containing nitrogen, potassium or phosphorus may encourage growth of aquatic plants and thus increase the available energy in the local food-web. This can lead to increased concentrations of suspended organic material. In some cases specific micro-nutrients may be required to allow the available nutrients to be fully utilised by living organisms. In other cases, the presence of specific chemical species may produce toxic effects limiting growth and abundance of living matter.

=== Metals ===
Many dissolved or suspended metal salts exert harmful effects in the environment sometimes at very low concentrations. Some aquatic plants are able to remove very low metal concentrations, with the metals ending up bound to clay or other mineral particles.

== Organisms ==
Saprophytic bacteria and fungi can convert organic matter into living cell mass, carbon dioxide, water and a range of metabolic by-products. These saprophytic organisms may then be predated upon by protozoa, rotifers and, in cleaner waters, Bryozoa which consume suspended organic particles including viruses and pathogenic bacteria. Clarity of the water may begin to improve as the protozoa are subsequently consumed by rotifers and cladocera. Purifying bacteria, protozoa, and rotifers must either be mixed throughout the water or have the water circulated past them to be effective. Sewage treatment plants mix these organisms as activated sludge or circulate water past organisms living on trickling filters or rotating biological contactors.

Aquatic vegetation may provide similar surface habitat for purifying bacteria, protozoa, and rotifers in a pond or marsh setting; although water circulation is often less effective. Plants and algae have the additional advantage of removing nutrients from the water; but some of those nutrients will be returned to the water when the plants die unless the plants are removed from the water. Because of the complex chemistry of Phosphorus much of this element is in an unavailable form unless decomposition creates anoxic conditions which render the phosphorus available for re-uptake. Plants also provide shade, a refuge for fish, and oxygen for aerobic bacteria. In addition, fish can limit pests such as mosquitoes. Fish and waterfowl feces return waste to the water, and their feeding habits may increase turbidity. Cyanobacteria have the disadvantageous ability to add nutrients from the air to the water being purified and to generate toxins in some cases.

The choice of organism depends on the local climate different species and other factors. Indigenous species usually tend to be better adapted to the local environment.

=== Macrophytes ===
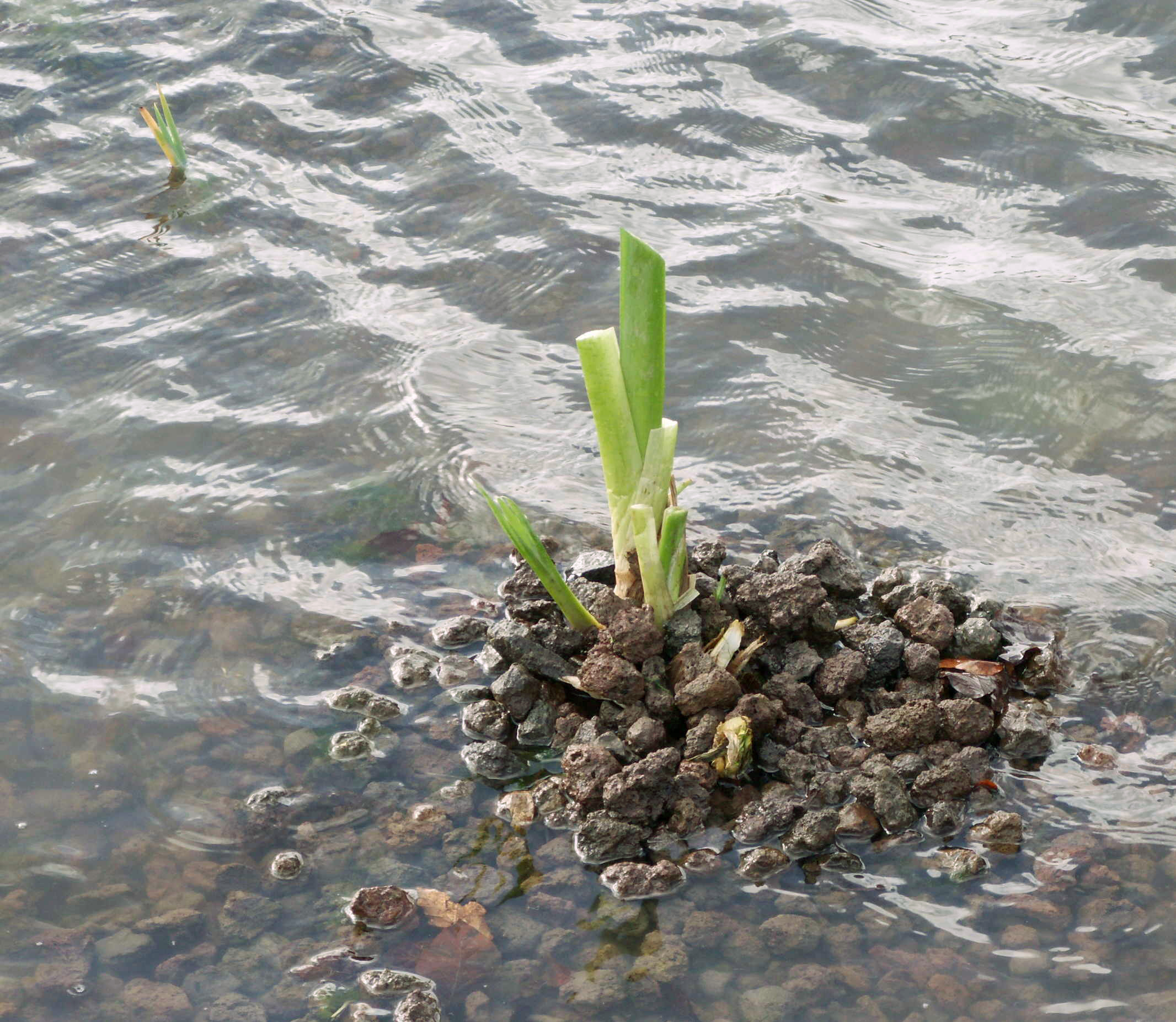
A water-purifying plant (Iris pseudacorus) in growth after winter (leaves die at that time of year)

The choice of plants in engineered wet-lands or managed lagoons is dependent on the purification requirements of the system and this may involve plantings of varying plant species at a range of depths to achieve the required goal.

Plants purify water by consuming excess nutrients and by providing surfaces upon which a wide range of other purifying organisms can live. They also are effective oxygenators in sunlight. They also have the ability to translocate chemicals between their submerged foliage and their root systems and this is of significance in engineered wet-lands designed to de-toxify waste waters. Plants that have been used in temperate climates include Nymphea alba, Phragmites australis, Sparganium erectum, Iris pseudacorus, Schoenoplectus lacustris and Carex acutiformis.

Macrophytes can also remove trace metals and emerging contaminants through adsorption to root surfaces, rhizofiltration, and internal sequestration within plant tissues, often alongside bacteria in the rhizosphere that degrade organic pollutants or alter metal speciation. Constructed or floating wetland systems using species such as Eichhornia crassipes and Lemna minor have shown measurable reductions in metals, pharmaceuticals, and PFAS in lake and reservoir settings by coupling plant uptake with microbial degradation and ion-exchange processes.

Where oxygenation is a critical requirement Stratiotes aloides, Hydrocharis morsus-ranae, Acorus calamus, Myriophyllum species and Elodea have been used. Hydrocharis morsus-ranae and Nuphar lutea have been used where shade and cover are required.

=== Fish ===
Fish are frequently the top level predators in a managed treatment eco-system and in some case may simply be a mono-culture of herbivorous species. Management of multi-species fisheries requires careful management and may involve a range of fish species including bottom-feeders and predatory species to limit population growth of the herbivorous fish.

=== Rotifers ===
Rotifers are microscopic complex organisms and are filter feeders removing fine particulate matter from water. They occur naturally in aerobic lagoons, activated sludge processes, in trickling filters and in final settlement tanks and are a significant factor in removing suspended bacterial cells and algae from the water column.

=== Annelids ===
Annelid worms are essential to the effective operation of trickling filters helping to remove excess bio-mass and enhancing natural sloughing of the bio-film. Supernumerary worms are very commonly found in the drainage troughs around trickling filters and in the final settlement sludge. Annelids also play a key role in lagoon treatment systems and in the effective working or engineered wet-lands. In this environment worms are a principal force in mixing in the upper few centimetres of the sediment layer exposing organic material to both oxidative and anoxic environments aiding the complete breakdown of most organics. They are also a key ingredient in the food-chain transferring energy upwards to fish and aquatic birds.

=== Protozoa ===
The range of protozoan species found is very wide but may include species of the following:

- Amoeba
- Arcella
- Blepharisma
- Didinium
- Euglena
- Hypotrichia
- Paramecium
- Suctoria
- Stylonychia
- Vorticella

=== Insects ===
- Chironomidae bloodworm larva
- Podura aquatica water springtail
- Psychodidae drain fly or filter fly larva

== Bacteria ==
Bacteria are probably the most significant group of organisms involved in water purification and are ubiquitous in all biological purification environments. Some such as Sphaerotilus natans are typically associated with grossly polluted waters, but even in such environments the bacteria are degrading the organic material present.

== See also ==
- Aquatic plant
- Detoxification
- Slow sand filter
- Waste stabilization pond
- Water purification

== Sources ==
- Fair, Gordon Maskew, Geyer, John Charles & Okun, Daniel Alexander Water and Wastewater Engineering (Volume 2) John Wiley & Sons (1968)
- Hammer, Mark J. Water and Waste-Water Technology John Wiley & Sons (1975) ISBN 0-471-34726-4
- Metcalf & Eddy Wastewater Engineering McGraw-Hill (1972)
