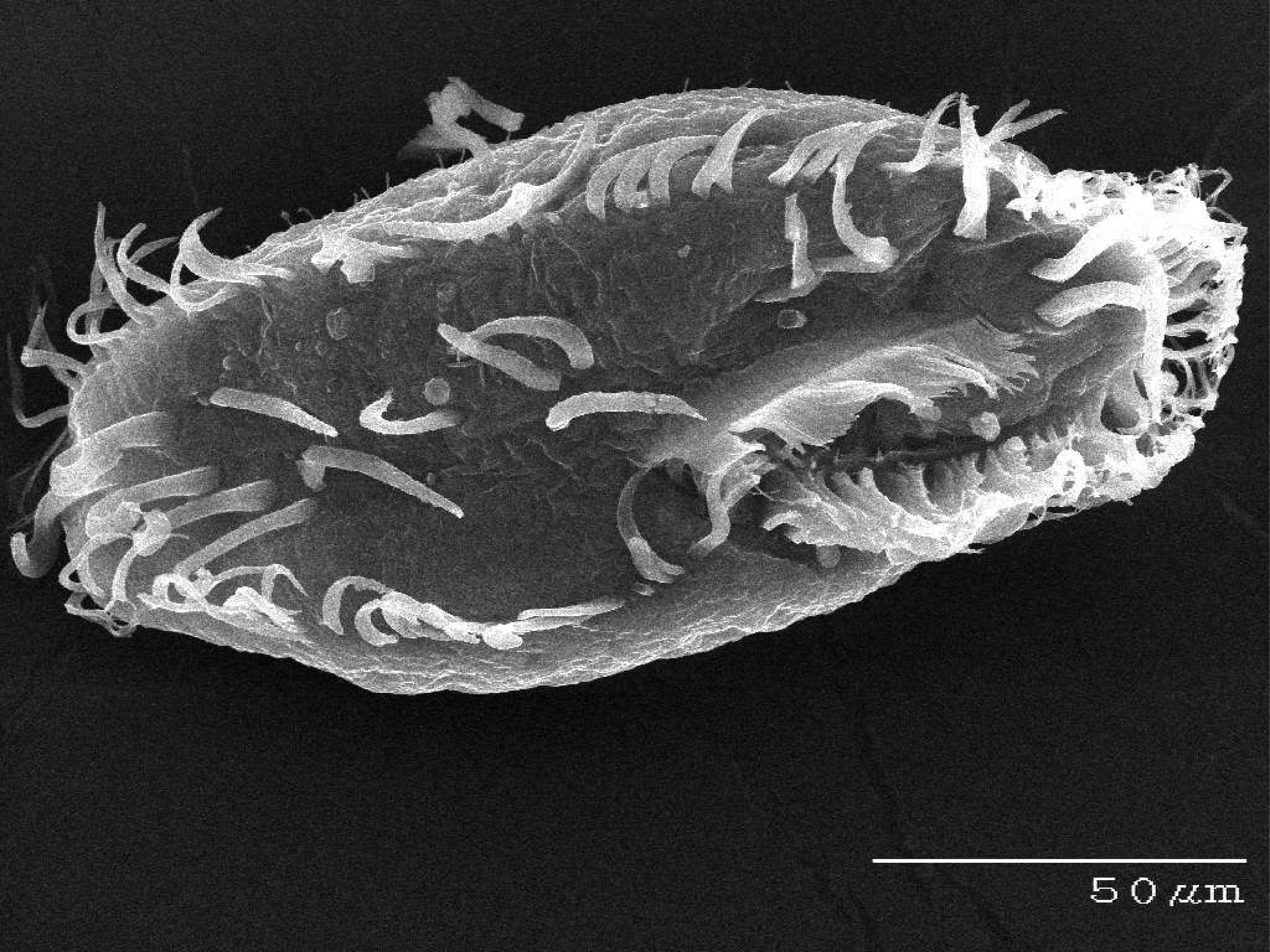
- Oxytricha trifallax

Scientific classification
- Domain: Eukaryota
- Clade: Diaphoretickes
- Clade: SAR
- Clade: Alveolata
- Phylum: Ciliophora
- Class: Spirotrichea
- Subclass: Stichotrichia
- Order: Sporadotrichida; Fauré-Fremiet, 1961

Families
- Oxytrichidae

= Sporadotrichida =

Order of single-celled organisms

Sporadotrichida is an order of ciliates in the subclass Stichotrichia.
