= Anteholosticha =

Scientific classification
- Domain: Eukaryota
- Clade: Sar
- Clade: Alveolata
- Phylum: Ciliophora
- Class: Spirotrichea
- Order: Urostylida
- Family: Holostichidae
- Genus: Anteholosticha; Berger, 2003

Species
- See text

Genus of single-celled organism

Anteholosticha is a genus of hypotrich, a group of protists.

== Species ==
According to the World Register of Marine Species, the following species are accepted within Anteholosticha:

- Anteholosticha arenicola (Kahl, 1932) Berger, 2003
- Anteholosticha azerbaijanica (Alekperov & Asadullayeva, 1999) Berger, 2006
- Anteholosticha eigneri Shao et al., 2009
- Anteholosticha estuarii (Borror & Wicklow, 1983) Berger, 2003
- Anteholosticha extensa (Kahl, 1932) Berger, 2003
- Anteholosticha fasciola (Kahl, 1932) Berger, 2003
- Anteholosticha gracilis (Kahl, 1932)
- Anteholosticha longissima (Dragesco & Dragesco-Kernéis, 1986) Berger, 2006
- Anteholosticha manca (Kahl, 1932) Berger, 2003
- Anteholosticha monilata (Kahl, 1932) Berger, 2003
- Anteholosticha multistilata (Kahl, 1932) Berger, 2003
- Anteholosticha oculata (Mereschkowsky, 1877) Berger, 2003
- Anteholosticha pulchra (Kahl, 1932) Berger, 2003
- Anteholosticha scutellum (Cohn, 1866) Berger, 2006
- Anteholosticha warreni (Song & Wilbert, 1997) Berger, 2003
