= Uroleptus lamella =

Scientific classification
- Domain: Eukaryota
- Clade: Sar
- Clade: Alveolata
- Phylum: Ciliophora
- Class: Spirotrichea
- Order: Urostylida
- Family: Urostylidae
- Genus: Uroleptus
- Species: U. lamella

Binomial name
- Uroleptus lamella Ehrenberg, 1831

Species of single-celled organism

Uroleptus lamella is a species of ciliate.

== Description ==
The organism is green coloured, and is hairy. Just like Uroleptus musculus, it is U-shaped and has an elongated body with 3 frontals, and 2-4 rows of ventral cirri. It has no transverse cirri, and its "collar" can extend a short distance along right side of the body.
