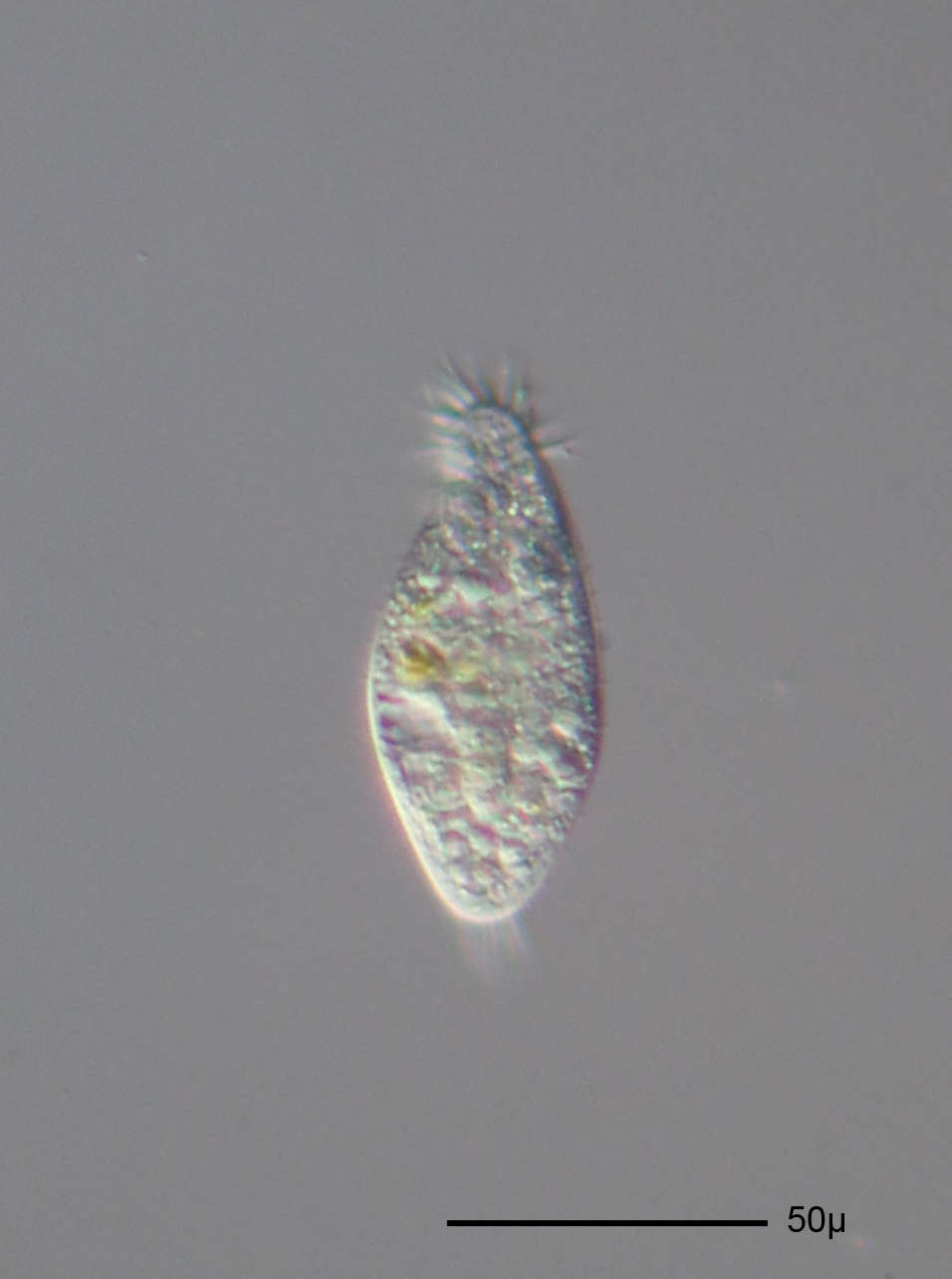
- Holosticha gibba

Scientific classification
- Domain: Eukaryota
- Clade: Diaphoretickes
- Clade: Sar
- Clade: Alveolata
- Phylum: Ciliophora
- Class: Spirotrichea
- Order: Urostylida
- Family: Holostichidae
- Genus: Holosticha; Wrzesniowski, 1877

= Holosticha =

Genus of single-celled organism

Holosticha is a genus of littoral ciliates.

== Species ==
The following 77 species are accepted in the genus Holosticha.

- Holosticha alpestris Kahl, 1932
- Holosticha antarctica Wilbert & Song, 2008
- Holosticha apodiademata Wilbert & Song, 2008
- Holosticha aquarum
- Holosticha arenicola Kahl, 1932
- Holosticha brachysticha Foissner, Agatha & Berger, 2002
- Holosticha bradburyae Gong, Song, Hu, Ma & Zhu, 2001
- Holosticha brevis Kahl, 1932
- Holosticha corlissi
- Holosticha coronata (Vuxanovici, 1963) Buitkamp, 1977
- Holosticha coronata Gourret & Roeser, 1888
- Holosticha crassa Claparède & Lachmann, 1858
- Holosticha danubialis Kaltenbach, 1960
- Holosticha decolor Wallengren, 1900
- Holosticha diademata Rees, 1884
- Holosticha distyla Buitkamp, 1977
- Holosticha dragescoi
- Holosticha estuarii
- Holosticha extensa Kahl, 1932
- Holosticha fascicola
- Holosticha flavicans Kahl, 1932
- Holosticha flavorubra
- Holosticha foissneri Petz, Song & Wilbert, 1995
- Holosticha fontinalis Lepsi, 1926
- Holosticha fossicola Kahl, 1932
- Holosticha gibba Stein, 1859
- Holosticha gibba (Müller, 1786) Wrzesniowski, 1877
- Holosticha globulifera Kahl, 1932
- Holosticha gracilis Kahl, 1932
- Holosticha grisea Kahl, 1932
- Holosticha hamatula Lei, Xu & Choi, 2005
- Holosticha helluo
- Holosticha heterofoissneri Hu & Song, 2001
- Holosticha holomilnei
- Holosticha intermedia Bergh, 1889
- Holosticha islandica Berger & Foissner, 1989
- Holosticha lacteus Kahl, 1932
- Holosticha macronucleata
- Holosticha magnificus Kahl, 1932
- Holosticha manca Kahl, 1932
- Holosticha mancoidea Hemberger, 1985
- Holosticha marioni Gourret & Roeser, 1888
- Holosticha martimum Wang & Nie, 1932
- Holosticha micans
- Holosticha milnei Kahl, 1932
- Holosticha minima
- Holosticha mononucleata Gelei, 1954
- Holosticha multinucleata Maupas, 1883
- Holosticha muscicola Gellert, 1956
- Holosticha muscorum (Kahl, 1932) Foissner, 1982
- Holosticha muscorum Kahl, 1932
- Holosticha musculus Kahl, 1932
- Holosticha mystacea (Stein, 1859)
- Holosticha mystacina Stein, 1859
- Holosticha oblonga Schewiakoff, 1893
- Holosticha oculata Mereschkowsky, 1877
- Holosticha ovalis Kahl, 1932
- Holosticha piscis
- Holosticha polystylata Borror & Wicklow, 1983
- Holosticha pulchra Kahl, 1932
- Holosticha pullaster (Müller, 1773) Foissner, Blatterer, Berger & Kohmann, 1991
- Holosticha punctata Rees, 1884
- Holosticha randani
- Holosticha rhomboedrica (Vuxanovici, 1963) Buitkamp, 1977
- Holosticha scutellum Cohn, 1866
- Holosticha setifera Kahl, 1932
- Holosticha simplex
- Holosticha simplicis Wang & Nie, 1932
- Holosticha sphagni
- Holosticha spindleri Petz, Song & Wilbert, 1995
- Holosticha stagnatilis Stokes, 1891
- Holosticha thiophaga Kahl, 1928
- Holosticha thononensis Dragesco, 1966
- Holosticha velox Quennerstedt, 1869
- Holosticha venalis Stokes, 1887
- Holosticha vernalis Stokes, 1887
- Holosticha violacea Kahl, 1928
- Holosticha wrzesniowskii Mereschkowsky, 1877
