= Nuummite =

Rare metamorphic rock

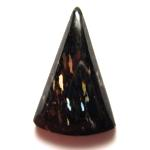

General
- Category: Mineral variety
- Formula: (Mg_{2})(Mg_{5})Si_{8}O_{22}(OH)_{2}

Identification
- Formula mass: 780.82 gm
- Color: Black, grey
- Twinning: None
- Cleavage: Perfect on 210
- Fracture: Conchoidal
- Mohs scale hardness: 5.5 - 6.0
- Luster: Vitreous/glossy
- Diaphaneity: opaque
- Density: 2.85 - 3.57
- Refractive index: 1.598 - 1.697 Biaxial
- Birefringence: 0.0170 - 0.230

Nuummite is a rare metamorphic rock that consists of the amphibole minerals gedrite and anthophyllite. It is named after the area of Nuuk in Greenland, where it was found.

== Description ==
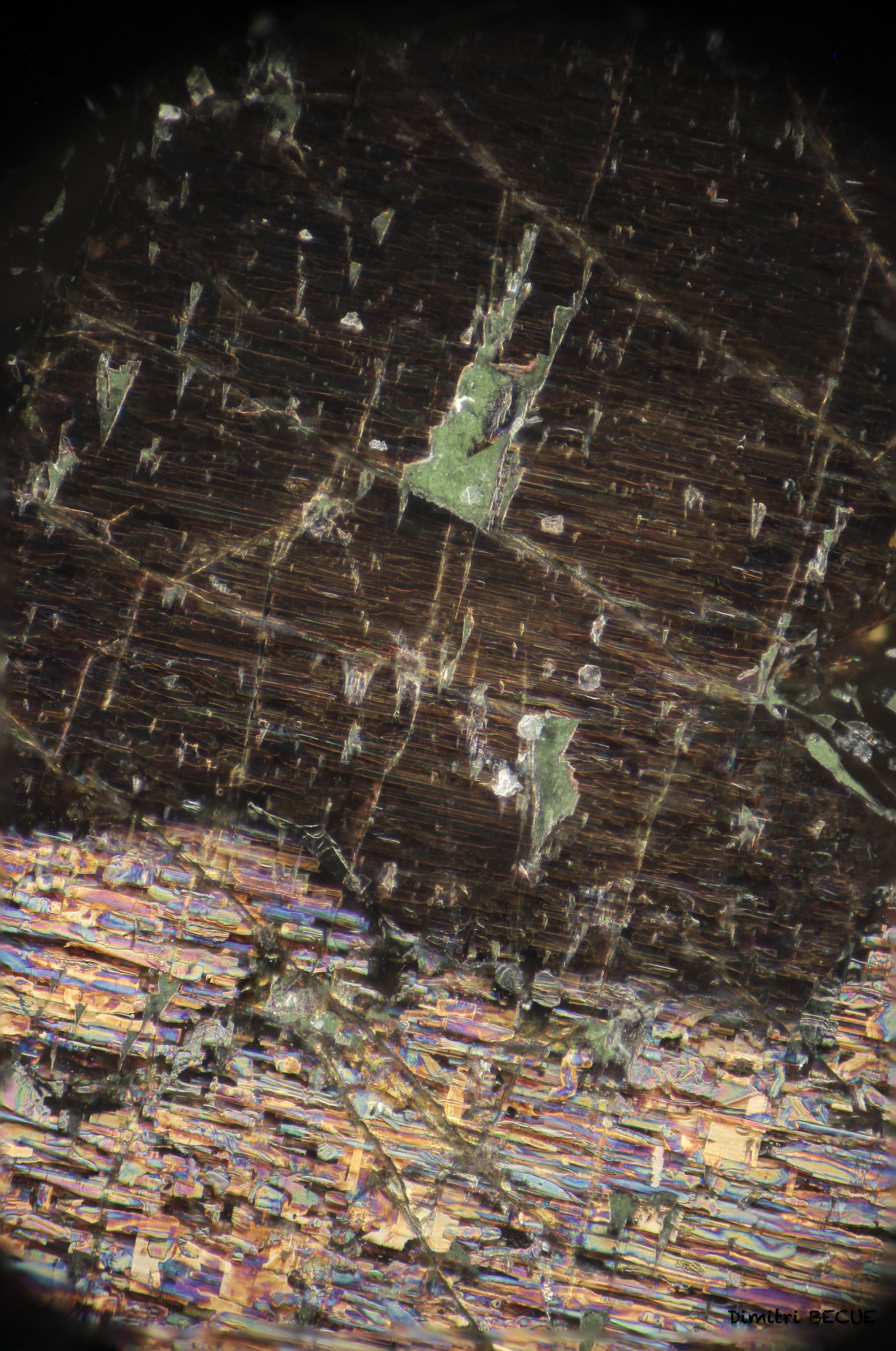
Nuummite under 240x magnification

Nuummite, usually black in colour and opaque, consists of two amphiboles, gedrite and anthophyllite, which form exsolution lamellae that give the rock its typical iridescence. Other common minerals in the rock are pyrite, pyrrhotite and chalcopyrite, which form shimmering yellow bands in polished specimens.

In Greenland the rock formed due to two consecutive metamorphic overprints of an originally igneous rock. The intrusion took place in the Archean around 2800 million years ago, the metamorphic overprints have been dated at 2700 and 2500 million years ago.

== History ==
The rock was first discovered in 1810 in Greenland by the mineralogist K. L. Giesecke. It was defined scientifically by O. B. Bøggild between 1905 and 1924.

In 2009, a new variety of nuummite was discovered in central Mauritania. Under its unofficial name Jenakite, this variety is distinctive due to the presence and high density of blue and green anthophyllite needle-like crystals. It has no golden anthophyllite needle-like crystals.

Nuummite from Greenland predominantly has golden and occasionally blue anthophyllite needle-like crystals.
