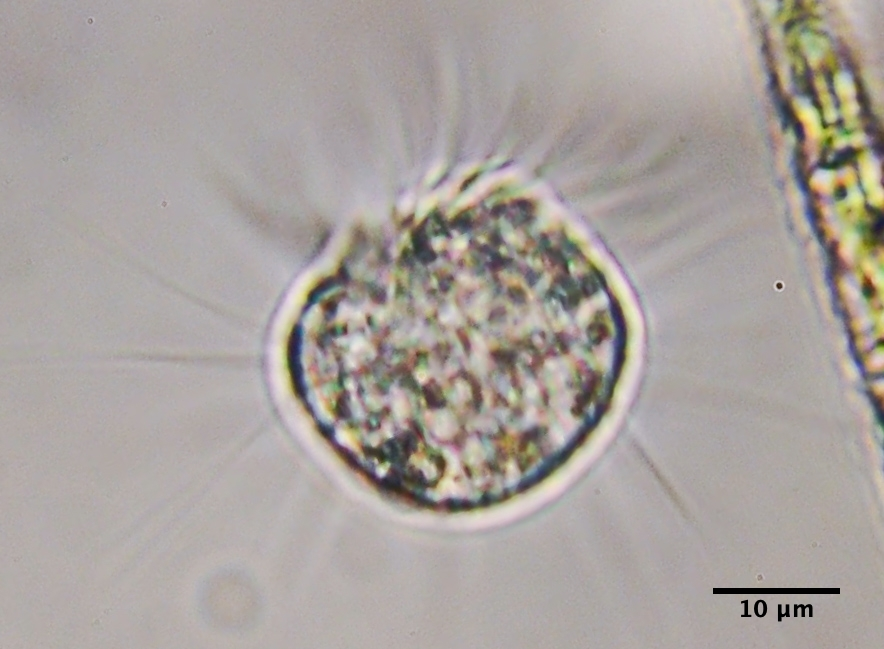

Scientific classification
- Domain: Eukaryota
- Clade: Sar
- Clade: Alveolata
- Phylum: Ciliophora
- Class: Oligotrichea
- Order: Halteriida
- Family: Halteriidae
- Genus: Halteria

Species
- H. grandinella H. bifurcate H. chorelligera H. cirrifera H. decemsulcata H. geleiana H. máxima H. mínima H. minuta H. oblonga H. ovata H. verrucosa H. viridis H. vorax

= Halteria =

Genus of single-celled organisms

Halteria, sometimes referred to as the jumping oligotrich, is a genus of common planktonic ciliates that are found in many freshwater environments. Halteria are easy to locate due to their abundance and distinctive behaviour with observations of Halteria potentially dating back to the 17th century and the discovery of microorganisms. Over time more has been established about their morphology and behavior, which has led to many changes in terms of classification.

Species of Halteria can exist in both a trophic and an encysted form but are most commonly described in the trophic form. Species of Halteria can be identified by their unique jumping movement which is enabled by an equatorial row of stiff cirri that beat in unison, allowing the organism to move very quickly backwards.

Members of the genus Halteria are heterotrophic and serve as important bacterivores in the habitats they occupy as well as being preyed upon primarily by metazoans. One paper published on December 27 2022 identified Halteria sp. as the first identified "virovore", an organism that can feed on virus. The cells of Halteria are roughly dome shaped and in addition to the equatorial cirri, they possess a collar of cilia around the buccal opening used for feeding and locomotion. The important ecological role played by Halteria as well as its unique locomotion strategy, makes Halteria a genus of interest in different areas of protistology research.

== History of knowledge ==
The genus Halteria is abundant in many freshwater environments. The ubiquity of this genus is likely why observations date back hundreds of years. The original description of the genus is not clearly established, but it is possible that observations of Halteria date back to Antony van Leewenhoek's observations in 1675 as the fourth animalcule observed in an earthen pot full of rainwater. The organism he observed was small, swift, and seen to stand still before quickly changing direction and travelling straight, which is consistent with the characteristic movement of Halteria.

The name Halteria is credited to Félix Dujardin in 1840, who reclassified Trichodina grandinella and Trichodina vorax, which had been previously classified by Müller and Ehrenberg respectively, as H. grandinella and H. vorax. Creating the new genus, Halteria, when the two species were found not to fit the subfamily Vorticellina, under which the genus Trichodina fell. Descriptions of Halteria at this time were still rather vague, focusing on the quick jumping movement that results from the beating of its cirri and the presence of oral cilia.

In 1858, Édouard Claparède and Johannes Lachmann described Halteria grandinella in greater detail. Noting explicitly for the first time, that the cirri are only found in an equatorial belt around the cell. New details relating to the buccal cavity were also discovered; Claparède and Lachmann observed that there was an indentation in a portion of the buccal apparatus and that at this site no oral cilia are present. This means that the oral cilia form an incomplete circle around the buccal cavity, and do not surround it completely as was previously assumed.

Questions on the classification of Halteria have arisen again in more recent years. Halteria have been most commonly classified as a member of the oligotrich group of ciliates, because they possess the group's characteristic prominent oral cilia arranged in an incomplete circle. However, recent deep sequencing and RNA analysis of Halteria indicate that Halteria may be more closely related to oxytrichids than oligotrichs, suggesting the similarity in oral apparatus with oligotrichs is the result of convergent evolution.

== Description ==
Halteria can exist in a trophic, ciliated stage or an encysted stage and the morphology of the cells varies significantly between stages.

=== Trophic stage ===
In the trophic stage, Halteria cells are globular and between 15 and 35 μm in size. Cells possess both oral cilia and rigid equatorial cirri. A collar of prominent oral cilia can be found at the anterior end of Halteria cells, partially surrounding the buccal cavity. This oral apparatus consists of fifteen membranelles that encircle the peristome and seven membranelles inside the buccal cavity.

The rigid cirri of Halteria, sometimes referred to as jumping bristles, are each 15-25 μm long. The cirri are organized equatorially around the cells in 7-10 longitudinal rows. Each row is in turn organized into four groups of cirri. When species of Halteria beat these cirri in unison, they generate a characteristic jumping motion sufficiently distinct to Halteria that observation of this movement has been considered sufficient for visual identification of Halteria

The cortex of Halteria is composed of four membranes. Two of these membranes, the inner and outer alveolar membranes, cover the flat alveoli which lie entirely beneath the two remaining membranes. The cell membrane sits directly above the outer alveolar membrane and covers the entire cell including the cilia. The perilemma is the fragile outermost membrane seen covering only small portions of the cell. The fragility of the perilemma may be the cause of this distribution as it would be difficult to preserve. Just beneath the membranes of the cortex, the body shape of Halteria is stabilized by microtubules in a basket configuration.

Within Halteria cells, a contractile vacuole is located approximately midway between the anterior and posterior ends of the cell. The mitochondria of Halteria are usually spherical with tubular cristae. Within the mitochondria of H. geleiana, microorganisms have been observed within the matrix. The microorganisms were rod shaped and observed with various lengths and in different numbers. No function or origin is currently known for these microorganisms or whether they are parasitic or symbiotic. Halteria have one micronucleus and a macronucleus with large band-like nucleoli. The macronucleus is oblong in shape while the micronucleus is more globular.

=== Encystment ===
As Halteria cells transition from the trophic to the encysted stage, initially their globular bodies elongate, primarily at the anterior end, until the length of the cell has nearly doubled. Owing to the uneven elongation, the buccal cavity is flattened, the membranelles of the oral apparatus move closer to the centre of the cell and the rows of cirri move closer to the posterior end of the cell. While the cell stretches, the cytoplasm develops 5 μm long conical structures. After this stage of elongation, the cells become more rounded, and a mucous envelope is extruded. Also during this next stage of encystment, the conical structures formed in the cytoplasm attach to the outer layer of the developing cyst, called the ectocyst. Once attached to the ectocyst, the conical structures are called lepidosomes. After encystment, cysts use the mucous envelope to firmly attach to any available substrate.

== Habitat and ecology ==
The genus Halteria consists of freshwater ciliates that typically live a planktonic lifestyle. The species Halteria grandinella is considered cosmopolitan, meaning that it is found in habitats across the world. Other species are less common and so they are less well defined, however frequent descriptions of Halteria grandinella have provided insight into the genus as a whole. Halteria are heterotrophic and unlike many closely related genera like Pelagohalteria, they have no photosynthetic endosymbionts. Halteria do frequently eat green algae which, when observed in food vacuoles, has led to misclassifications in the past when mistaken for endosymbionts.

Species of Halteria play a particularly large role in many freshwater habitats as bacteriovores. In a study that used fluorescently labelled bacteria in fishponds to observe protistan bacterivory, ciliate grazing accounted for 56% of total protistan grazing and Halteria, along with two other ciliate genera, Pelagohalteria and Rimostrombidium were responsible approximately 71% of the total ciliate bacterivory. Halteria also act as prey for many metazoan predators. It has been proposed that the characteristic jumping behavior of Halteria was evolved as an escape strategy to avoid such predation. Halteria are also able to act as virovores and can consume viruses, such as chloroviruses, to fuel growth and division.

Much of the research related to Halteria is focused on their movement and their ecological roles. Halteria acts as a model organism for the study of their jumping movement through ciliary beating. It can be found in abundance in diverse freshwater habitats interacting with other organisms as both predators and prey.

Halteria spend most of the time either stationary or moving smoothly through water propelled by the cilia at their anterior end. The halting jumping movement most associated with Halteria is the result of external stimulus such as currents, which is known because jumping in Halteria has been induced in a laboratory setting. Jumping behavior in Halteria requires 41% of the organism's total metabolic rate, and so employing it too frequently would be an inefficient use of energy.

== Reproduction ==
=== Asexual reproduction ===
Halteria can reproduce asexually by transverse binary fission. During this replication the majority of the ciliature that will be present on the daughter cells is formed de novo. The only exception to this is the oral ciliature of the parent cell which is inherited by the proter daughter cell. The parental cirri are resorbed by the cell during division and the cirri of both daughter cells are produced de novo from cirral anlagen and the oral ciliature of the opisthe daughter cell is generated de novo through the formation of an oral primordium at the posterior end of the cell. Both the macronucleus and micronucleus divide during the process resulting in two daughter cells that are genetically identical to the parent cell.

=== Conjugation ===
Halteria cells can reproduce sexually through a process that has been studied specifically in H. grandinella. During sexual reproduction, the ventral sides of two Halteria cells fuse. Various changes in morphology then occur through maturation divisions including a decrease in the number of cirri in both cells and the loss of buccal membranelles in one of the pair and the entire oral apparatus disappears in the other. The remaining membranelles are shared between the cells at the anterior end. On a nuclear level, during conjugation the original macronuclei fragment and the micronuclei mature and divide three times, with only one derivative of the first two divisions continuing to divide, forming two pronuclei in the third division. A pronuclei from each cell is exchanged and the two that end up in each cell fuse to form the synkaryon. The synkaryon divides twice with one derivative from each of the second divisions degenerating and the remaining derivatives becoming the new micronucleus and the macronucleus analge. After synkaryon division is complete, conjugates separate, now generating two cells with genetics distinct from the parent cells and from each other.
