= Lamella =

Lamella (pl.: lamellae) means a small plate or flake in Latin, and in English may refer to:

== Biology ==
- Lamella (mycology), a papery rib beneath a mushroom cap
- Lamella (botany)
- Lamella (surface anatomy), a plate-like structure in an animal
- Lamella of osteon, the concentric circles around the central Haversian canals
- Lamella (cell biology):
  - (i) part of a chloroplast (thin extension of thylakoid joining different grana)
  - (ii) the leading edge of motile cells, containing the lamellipodia
- Lamella (crab), a group of land crabs in the family Gecarcinucidae
- Uroleptus lamella, a species of protozoans
- Middle lamella, a pectin layer which cements the cell walls of two adjoining plant cells together
- Lamellae, element of molar teeth in members of Elephantidae

== Other uses ==
- "Lamella", a concept in the psychoanalytic theory of Jacques Lacan
- Lamella (materials), a fine, plate-like structure, usually in a group
- Lamellar armour
- Lamella clarifier, an inclined-plate clarifier used in water treatment systems
- Lamella (structures), used to cover wide, open areas with no supporting members (i.e. arenas, "domes")
- in the archaeology of Classical antiquity, a thin metal sheet with an inscription, usually religious or magical; see Totenpass
- Musical instrument reed
