= Hypotrich =

- Hypotrich ciliate in family Oxytrichidae

Scientific classification
- Domain: Eukaryota
- Clade: Sar
- Clade: Alveolata
- Phylum: Ciliophora
- Class: Spirotrichea
- Subclass: Hypotrichia; Stein 1859

Orders and families
- Stichotrichida Fauré-Fremiet, 1961; Amphisiellidae Jankowski, 1979; Atractosidae Bourland, 2015; Epiclintidae Wicklow & Borror, 1990; Gonostomidae Small & Lynn, 1985 (=Gonostomatidae Small & Lynn, 1985; Halteriidae Claparède and Lachmann, 1858; Holostichidae Fauré-Fremiet, 1961; Kahliellidae Tuffrau, 1979; Keronidae Dujardin, 1840; Oxytrichidae Ehrenberg, 1830; Parabirojimidae Dai and Xu, 2011; Plagiotomidae Bütschli, 1887; Psammomitridae Jankowski, 1979; Pseudoamphisiellidae Song et al., 1996; Psilotrichidae Bütschli, 1889; Schmidingerotrichidae Foissner, 2012; Spirofilidae von Gelei, 1929; Trachelostylidae Small and Lynn, 1985; Uroleptidae Foissner and Stoeck, 2008; Urostylida Jankowski, 1979; Bergeriellidae Liu et al., 2010; Hemicycliostylidae Lyu et al., 2018; Pseudokeronopsidae Borror & Wicklow, 1983; Pseudourostylidae Jankowski, 1979; Urostylidae Bütschli, 1889

Subclass of single-celled organisms

The hypotrichs are a group of ciliated protozoa, common in fresh water, salt water, soil and moss. Hypotrichs possess compound ciliary organelles called "cirri," which are made up of thick tufts of cilia, sparsely distributed on the ventral surface of the cell. The multiple fused cilia which form a cirrus function together as a unit, enabling the organism to crawl along solid substrates such as submerged debris or sediments. Hypotrichs typically possess a large oral aperture, bordered on one side by a wreath or collar of membranelles (small membranous structures made up of fused cilia), forming an "adoral zone of membranelles," or AZM.

== Classification ==
Diagram of the oxytrichid hypotrich Stylonychia mytilus

In older systems of classification, the term hypotrich comprised all ciliates possessing a relatively flattened body shape, strong cirri restricted to the ventral surface, and a large oral region (peristome) partially surrounded by an "adoral zone of membranelles". From a phylogenetic point of view, this historic grouping--which included both euplotid ciliates (such as Euplotes and Aspidisca), and stichotrichian ciliates (such as Oxytricha and Urostyla)--is paraphyletic. Any natural group, or clade, that contains both Euplotes and Oxytricha would also have to include many morphologically dissimilar spirotrich ciliates, such as the tintinnids and the oligotrichs.

In the classification system developed by Denis Lynn in collaboration with Eugene B. Small, the subclass Hypotrichia was restricted to euplotids and one small order of marine ciliates called Kiitrichida, while most of the traditional hypotrichs were placed in the subclass Stichotrichia. However, some prominent researchers—notably, the Austrian ciliatologist Helmut Berger—rejected Lynn's nomenclature, and continued to assign non-euplotid "hypotrich" ciliates, such as oxytrichids and urostyloids, to some variant of Friedrich von Stein's original order Hypotricha.

In their revised classification of the phylum Ciliophora, published in 2016, Gao et al. place the "stichotrichs" of Lynn & Small in the synonymous subclass Hypotrichia, and place all euplotid and discocephalid ciliates in the subclass Euplotia. The same high-level taxa are used, without ranks, by Adl et al. in their "Revised Classification of Eukaryotes" of 2012.

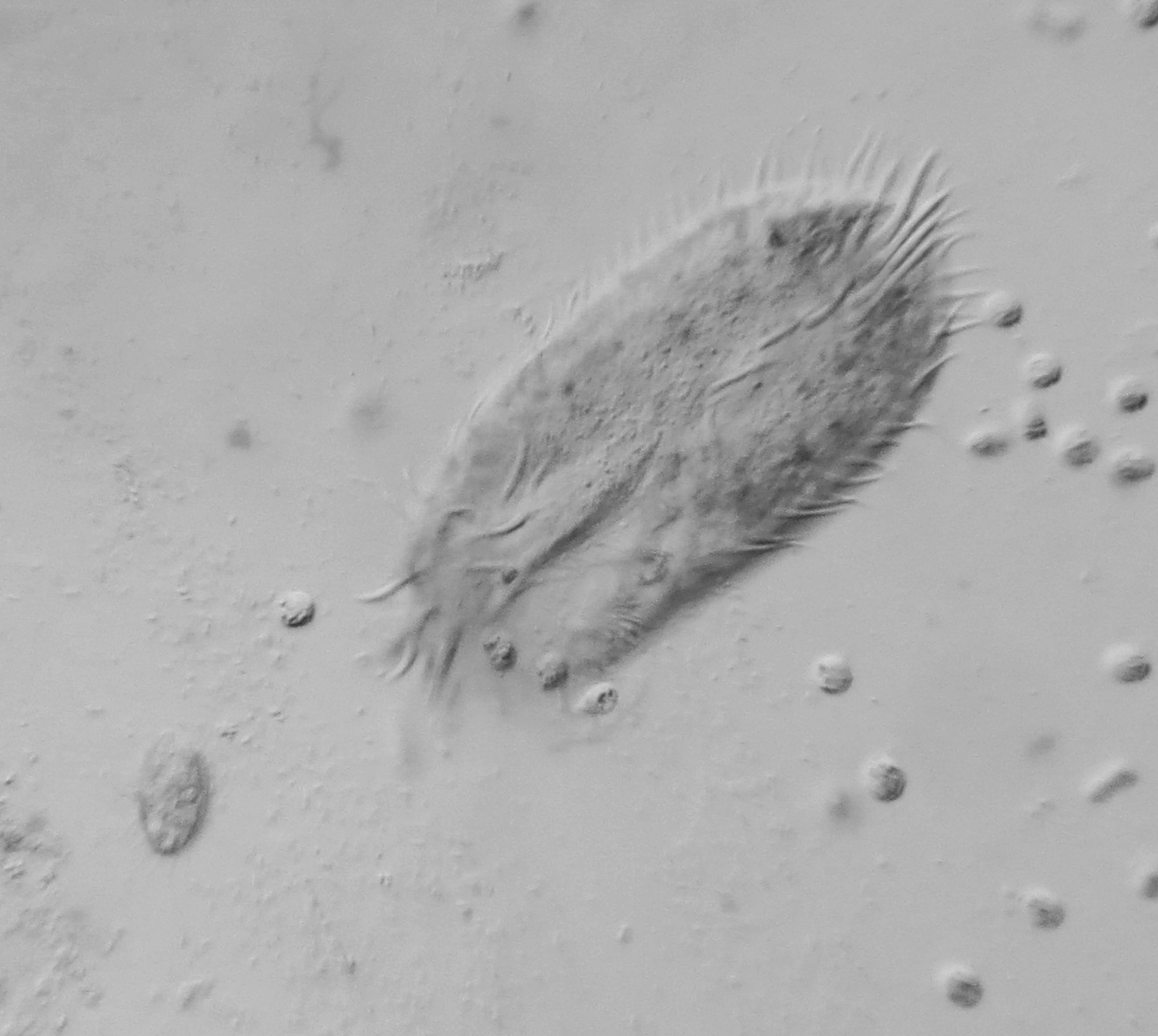
Oxytricha sp.

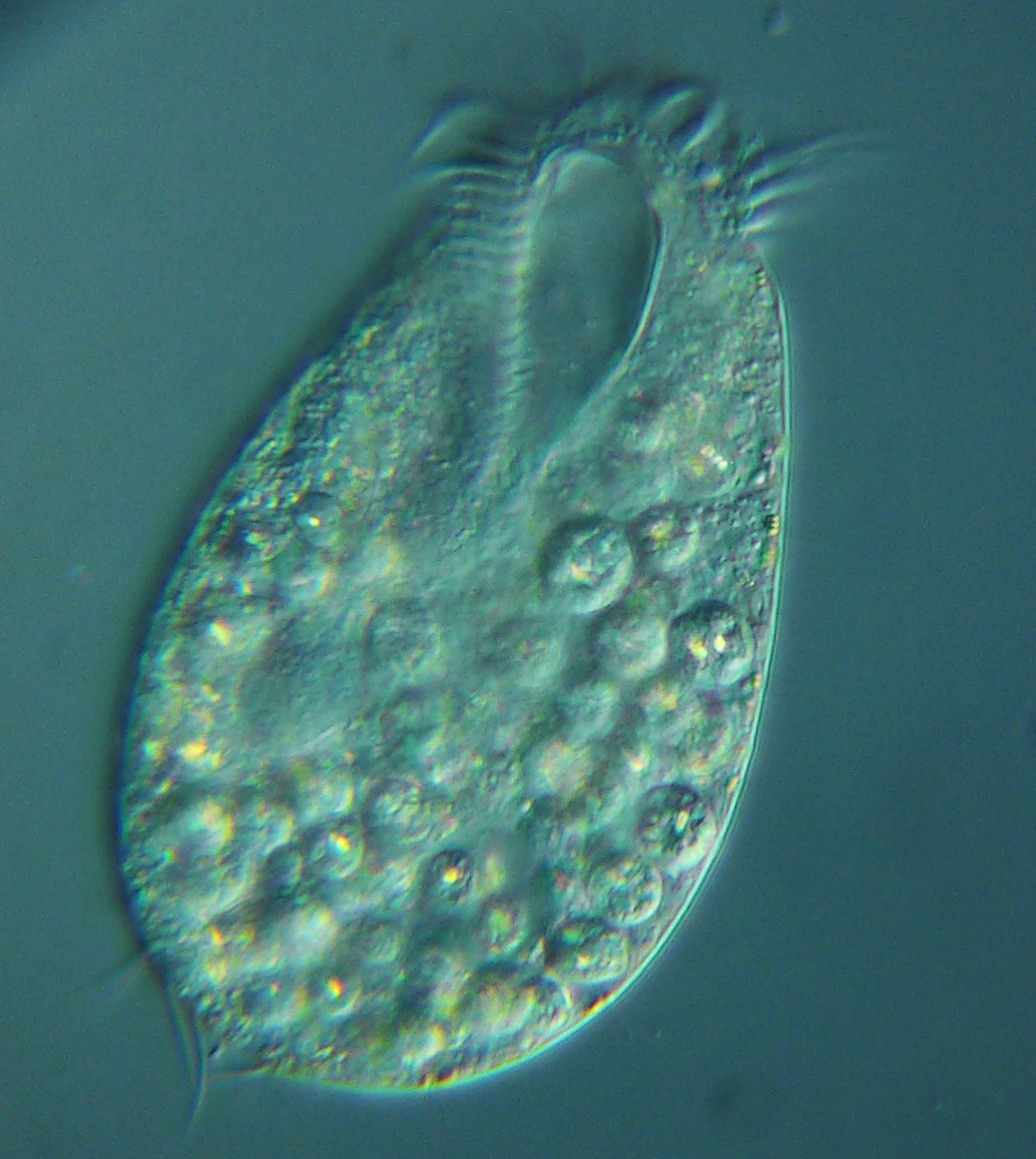
A hypotrich, ventral view

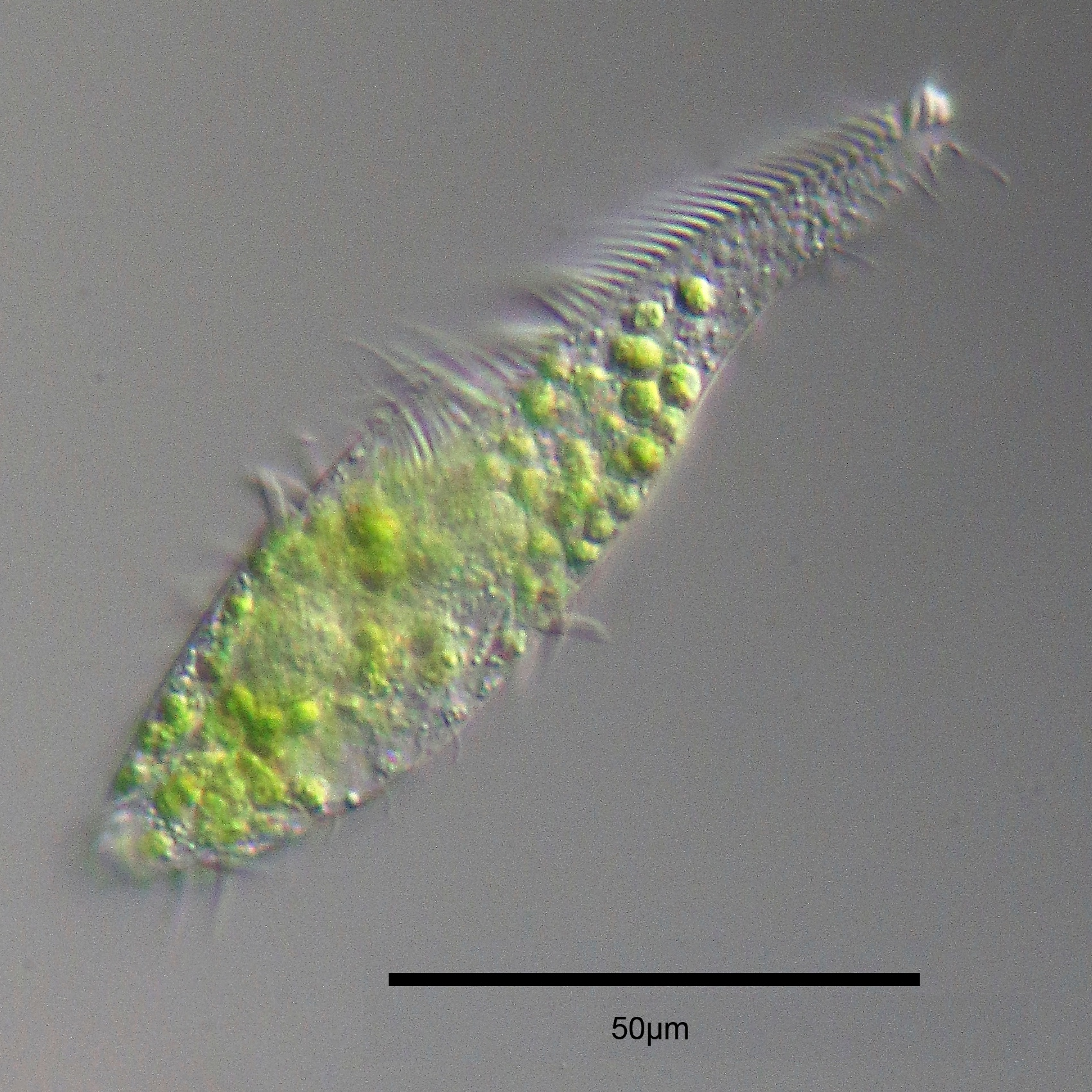
Stichotricha secunda
