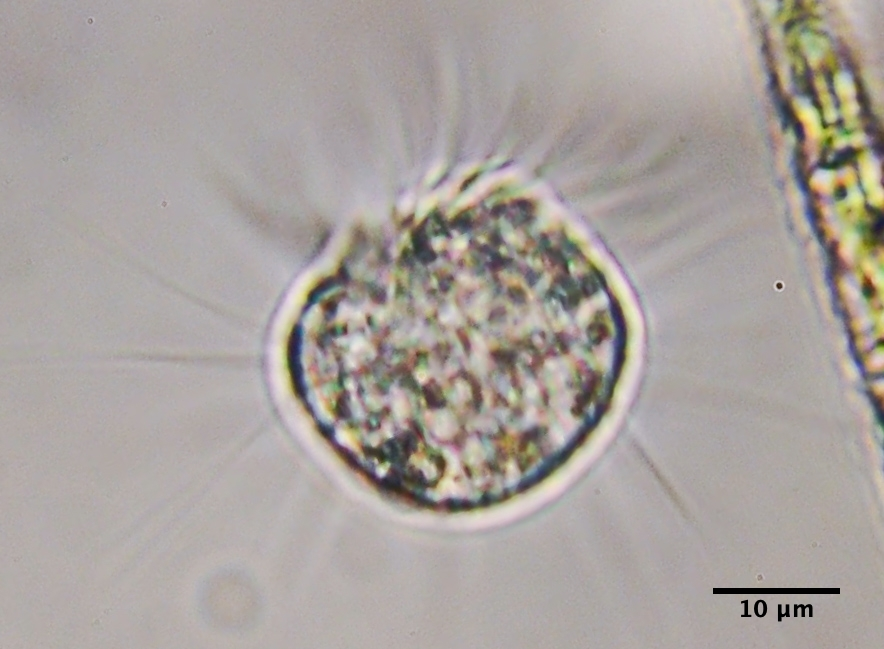

Scientific classification
- Domain: Eukaryota
- Clade: Diaphoretickes
- Clade: Sar
- Clade: Alveolata
- Phylum: Ciliophora
- Class: Oligotrichea
- Order: Halteriida
- Family: Halteriidae; Claparède & Lachmann, 1859

Genera
- Halteria Dujardin, 1841; Pelagohalteria Foissner, Skogstad & Pratt, 1988

= Halteriidae =

Family of single-celled organisms

Halteriidae is a family of planktonic ciliates.
