= Uroleptus musculus =

Scientific classification
- Domain: Eukaryota
- Clade: Sar
- Clade: Alveolata
- Phylum: Ciliophora
- Class: Spirotrichea
- Order: Urostylida
- Family: Urostylidae
- Genus: Uroleptus
- Species: U. musculus

Binomial name
- Uroleptus musculus (Müller, 1786)

Species of single-celled organism

Uroleptus musculus is a species of ciliate.

== Description ==
The organism is either white or rose-coloured. The collar extends from ventral files, that extends a short distance along the right side of the body. The body is also elongated and has a tail-like portion, that has 3 frontals and 2-4 rows of ventral cirri. It has no transverse cirri. The oral area is not U-shaped.
