= Stylonychia =

- Stylonychia mytilus

Scientific classification
- Domain: Eukaryota
- Clade: Sar
- Clade: Alveolata
- Phylum: Ciliophora
- Class: Spirotrichea
- Family: Oxytrichidae
- Genus: Stylonychia; Ehrenberg, 1830

Genus of single-celled organisms

Stylonychia is a genus of ciliates, in the subclass Hypotrichia. Species of Stylonychia are very common in fresh water and soil, and may be found on filamentous algae, surface films, and among particles of sediment. Like other Hypotrichs, Stylonychia has cilia grouped into membranelles alongside the mouth and cirri over the body. It is distinguished partly by long cirri at the posterior, usually a cluster of three. The largest can just be seen at a 25× magnification, and the smallest can just be seen at a 450× magnification.

== Description ==
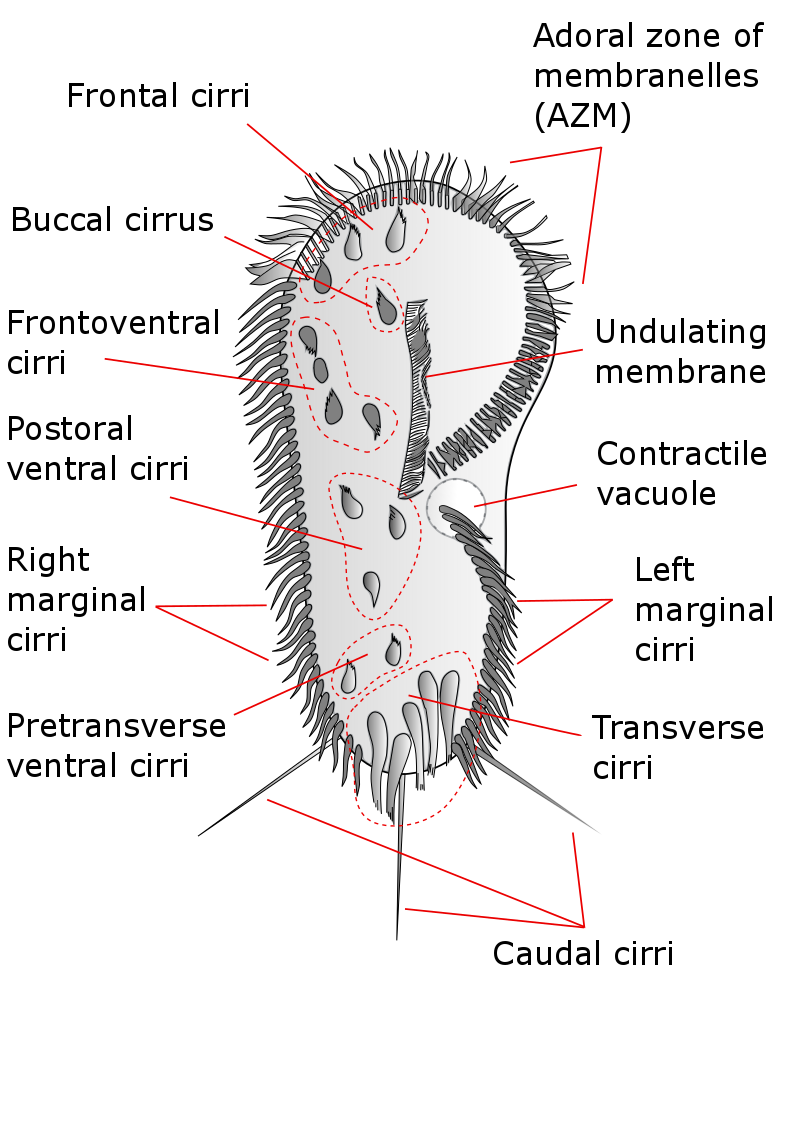
Stylonychia mytilus, with cirri labeled

Stylonychia mytilus, walking on its cirri

Stylonychia cells are roughly oval in shape, inflexible and flattened from back to front. The organism's cilia are grouped into structures called "cirri," tufts of joined cilia that function together as a unit. The cirri on the ventral surface of the cell can function as legs, enabling the organism to walk along solid substrates, such as submerged algae, leaves or debris.

Like other ciliates of the family Oxytrichidae, Stylonychia has a prominent group of eighteen large cirri on its ventral surface, arranged into six smaller groups: the frontal, buccal, frontoventral, postoral, pretransverse and transverse cirri. The region around the cell mouth (cytostome) is partially encircled by a series of compound cilia which make up the "adoral zone of membranelles", or AZM. This structure, which resembles the collar and lapel of a jacket, is used mainly to circulate water and brush particles of food into the organism's cell mouth. On the right side of the oral area are two "undulating membranes", delicate scarf-like structures made up of fused cilia. At the posterior of the cell are three long, stiff "caudal cirri", attached to the body at the lower margin of its dorsal surface.

== Image and video Gallery ==
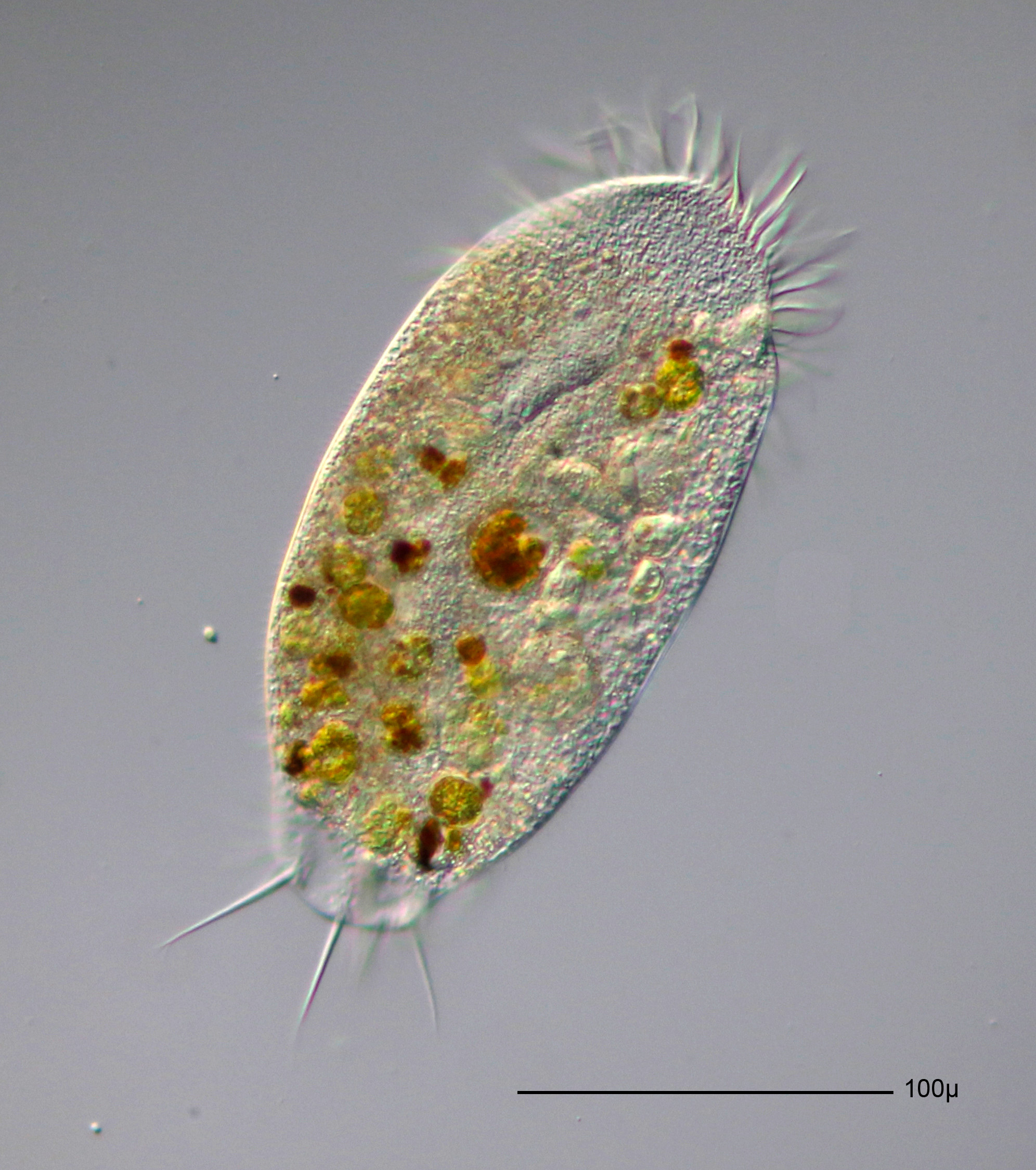
Stylonychia putrina

Stylonychia eating (vacuole formation)

Stylonychia growing a second mouth (stomatogenesis, prior to cell division)
