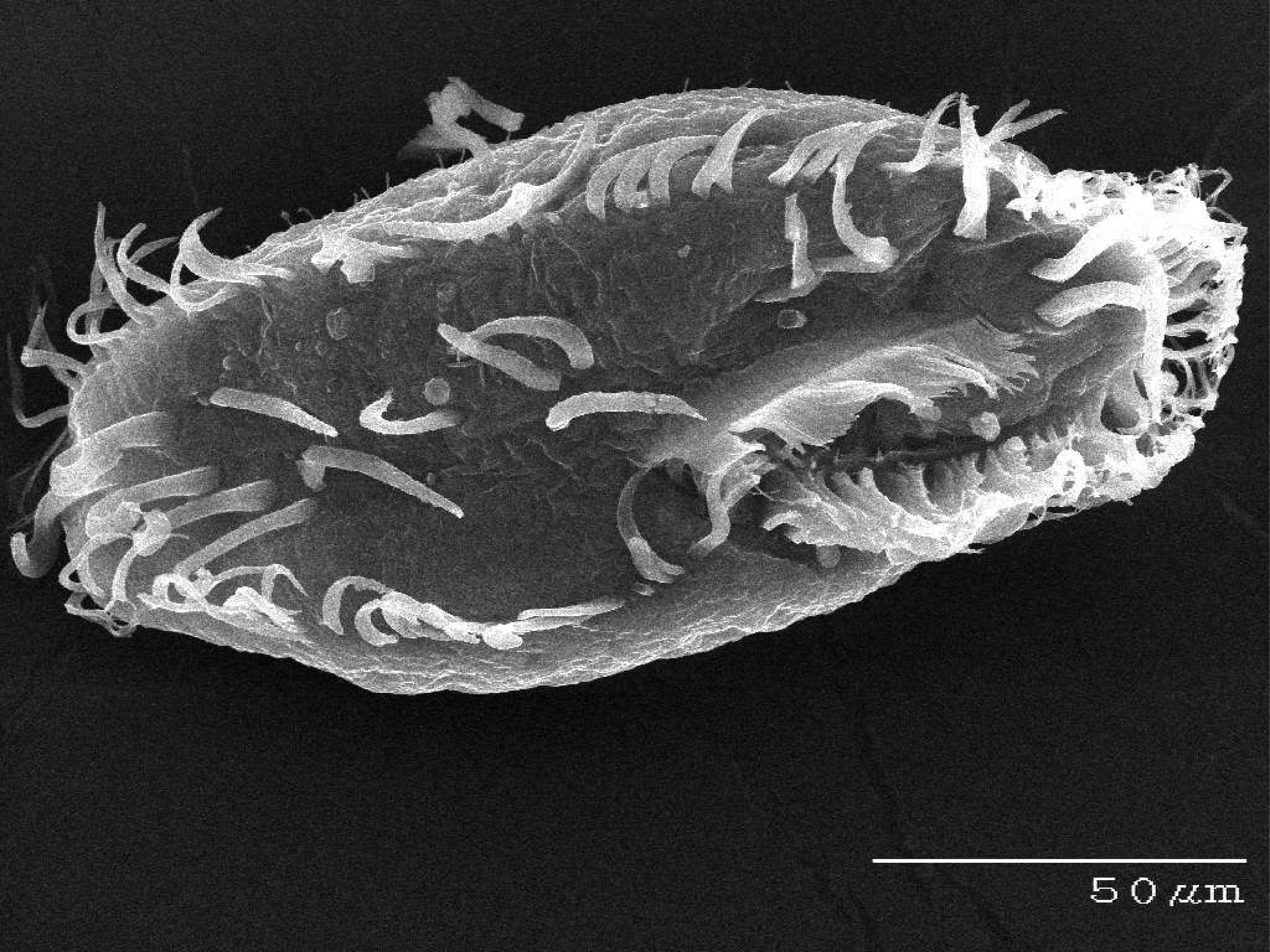
- Sterkiella histriomuscorum, formerly Oxytricha trifallax

Scientific classification
- Domain: Eukaryota
- Clade: Diaphoretickes
- Clade: SAR
- Clade: Alveolata
- Phylum: Ciliophora
- Class: Spirotrichea
- Subclass: Hypotrichia
- Family: Oxytrichidae; Ehrenberg, 1830

= Oxytrichidae =

Family of single-celled organisms

Oxytrichidae is a family of ciliates in the order Sporadotrichida. Oxytrichidae are morphologically diverse, ranging in length from 40 micrometres (e.g. Oxytricha setigera) to 400 micrometers (e.g. Coniculostomum monilata). They are generally elliptical in shape with some very flexible while others are rigid. Like other ciliates, Oxytrichidae have two or more nuclei: a large macronucleus that generally stretches across much of the cell body, and one or more smaller micronuclei.

== Genera ==
The following genera are recognised in the family Oxytrichidae:

- Subfamily Oxytrichinae Ehrenberg, 1838
  - Allotricha Sterki, 1878
  - Australocirrus Blatterer & Foissner, 1988
  - Cyrtohymena Foissner, 1989
  - Notohymena Blatterer & Foissner, 1988
  - Onychodromopsis Stokes, 1887
  - Oxytricha Bory de Saint-Vincent, 1824
  - Parurosoma Gelei, 1954
  - Pseudostrombidium Horváth, 1933
  - Rubrioxytricha Berger, 1999
  - Tachysoma Stokes, 1887
  - Urosoma Kowalewskiego, 1882
  - Urosomoida Hemberger in Foissner, 1982
- Subfamily Stylonychinae Berger & Foissner, 1997
  - Coniculostomum Njiné, 1979
  - Histriculus Corliss, 1960
  - Laurentiella Dragesco & Njine, 1971
  - Onychodromus Stein, 1859
  - Parastylonychia Dragesco, 1963
  - Patersoniella Foissner, 1987
  - Pleurotricha Stein, 1859
  - Rigidocortex Berger, 1999
  - Rigidohymena Berger, 2011
  - Steinia Diesing, 1866
  - Sterkiella Foissner, Blatterer, Berger & Kohmann, 1991
  - Stylonychia Ehrenberg, 1830
- Genera incertae sedis
  - Amphisiellides Foissner, 1988
  - Ancystropodium Fauré-Fremiet, 1907
  - Apoamphisiella Foissner, 1997
  - Gastrostyla Engelmann, 1862
  - Hemigastrostyla Song & Wilbert, 1997
  - Kerona Müller, 1786
  - Neokeronopsis Warren, Fyda & Song, 2002
  - Paraurostyla Borror, 1972
  - Parentocirrus Voß, 1997
  - Ponturostyla Jankowski, 1989
  - Pseudouroleptus Hemberger, 1985
  - Territricha Berger & Foissner, 1988
  - Urostyloides Shi & He, 1989
