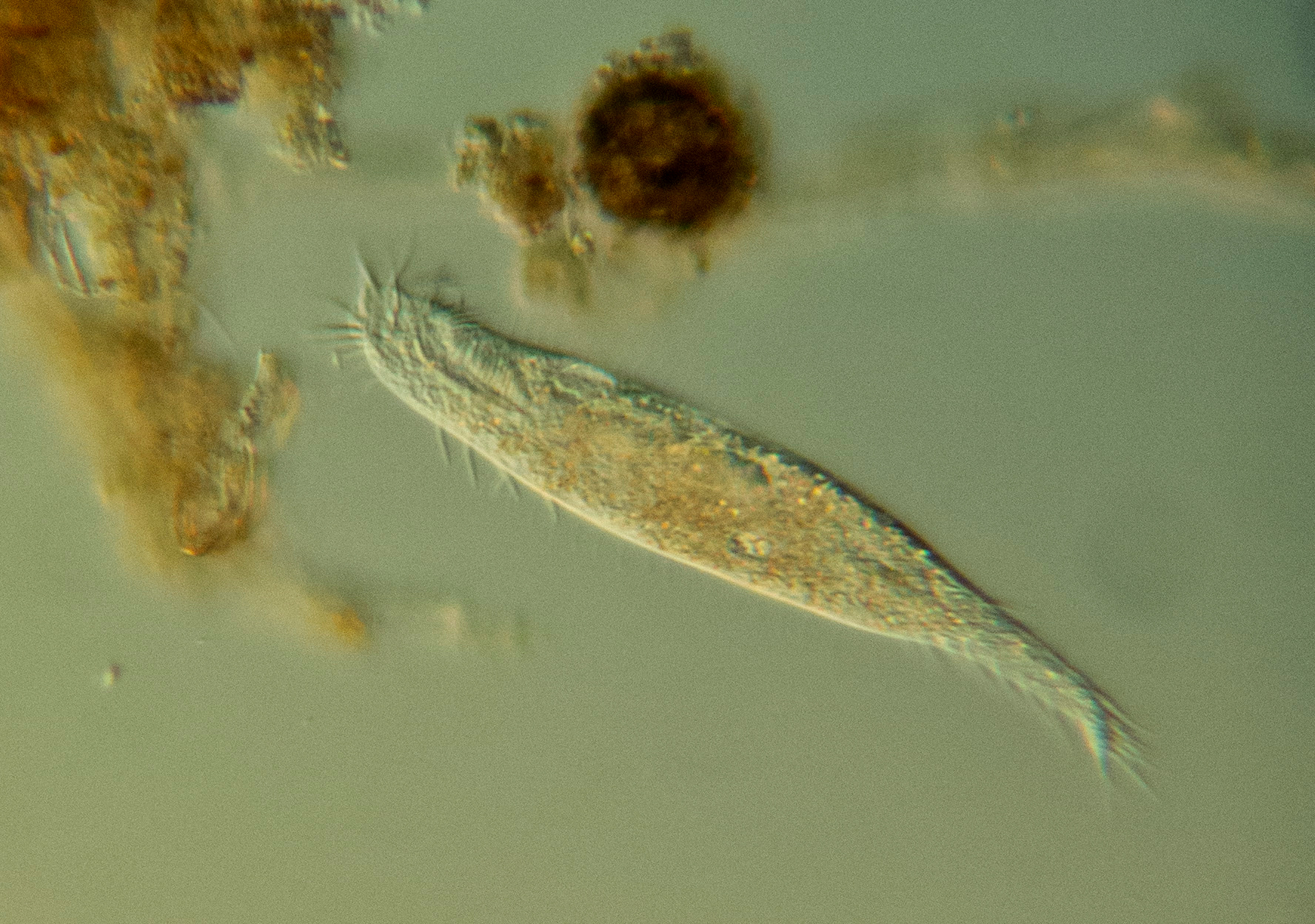
- Uroleptus piscis

Scientific classification
- Domain: Eukaryota
- Clade: Sar
- Clade: Alveolata
- Phylum: Ciliophora
- Class: Spirotrichea
- Order: Urostylida
- Family: Urostylidae
- Genus: Uroleptus; Ehrenberg, 1831

Species
- Uroleptus caudatus (Claparède & Lachmann, 1858) Kahl, 1930-5; Uroleptus elongatus Fernandez-Leborans, 1981; Uroleptus lacteus (Kahl, 1932) Borror, 1972; Uroleptus lamella (Ehrenberg, 1831) Borror, 1972; Uroleptus lepisma (Wenzel, 1953); Uroleptus magnificus (Kahl, 1932); Uroleptus musculus (Kahl, 1932); Uroleptus piscis (O.F. Müller, 1773) Ehrenberg, 1831

= Uroleptus =

Genus of single-celled organisms

Uroleptus is a genus of ciliates found in marine environments.
