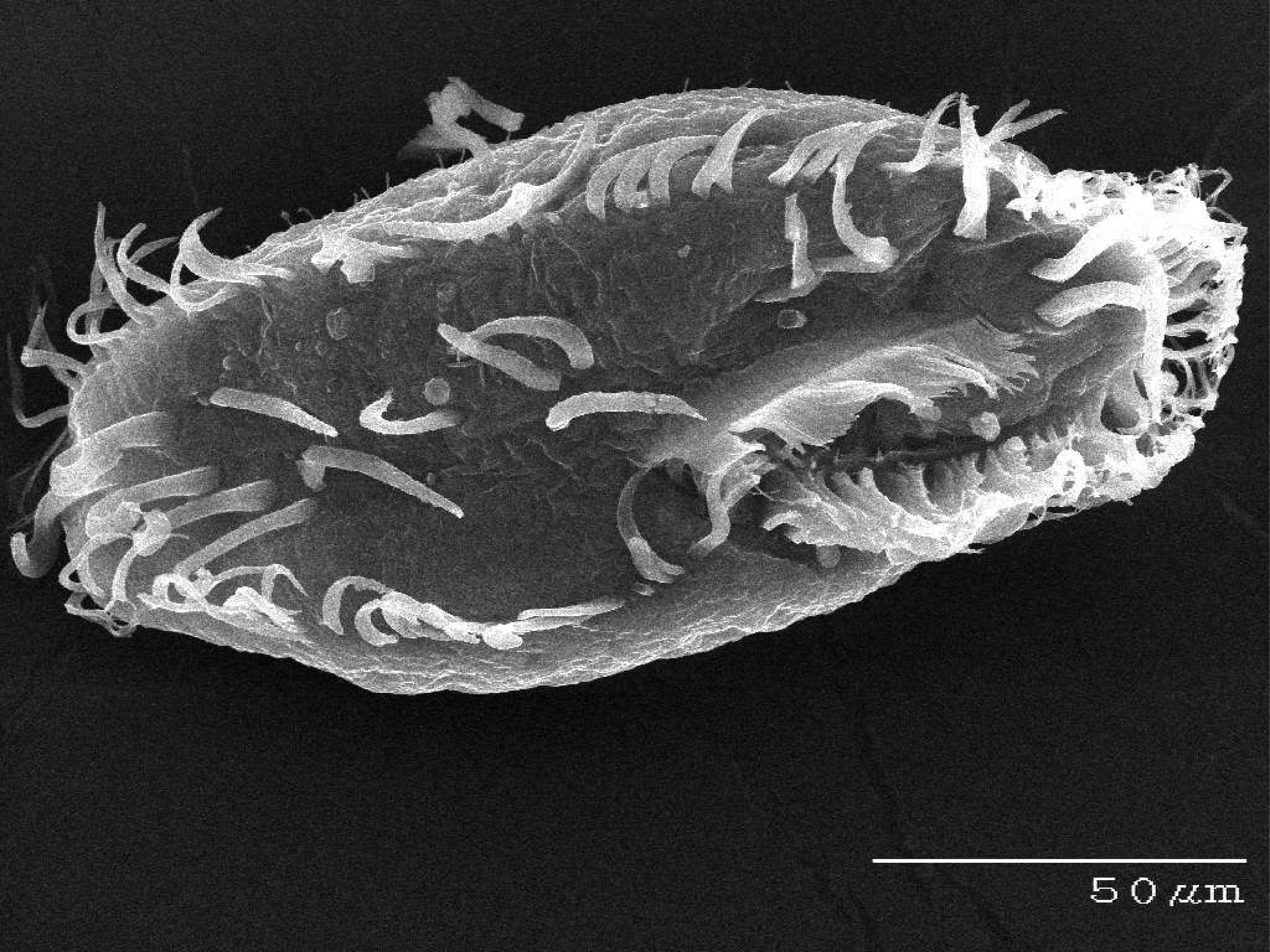
- Scanning electron microscope view of Oxytricha trifallax

Scientific classification
- Domain: Eukaryota
- Supergroup: Alveolata
- Phylum: Ciliophora
- Class: Spirotrichea
- Family: Oxytrichidae
- Subfamily: Oxytrichinae
- Genus: Oxytricha; Bory, 1824

Species
- Oxytricha aeruginosa Wrzesniowskiego, 1866; Oxytricha alfredi Berger, 1999; Oxytricha alfredkahli Foissner, 1987; Oxytricha atypica sp. nov.; Oxytricha auripunctata Blatterer & Foissner, 1988; Oxytricha balladyna Song & Wilbert, 1989; Oxytricha bimembranata Shibuya, 1929; Oxytricha chlorelligera Kahl, 1932; Oxytricha crassistilata Kahl, 1932; Oxytricha discifera Kahl, 1932; Oxytricha durhamiensis Berger, 1999; Oxytricha elongata (Smith, 1897) Kahl, 1932; Oxytricha enigmatica Dragesco & Dragesco-Kernéis, 1986; Oxytricha euglenivora Kahl, 1932; Oxytricha fallax Stein, 1859; Oxytricha faurei Tucolesco, 1962; Oxytricha fromenteli Foissner, 1987; Oxytricha geleii (Wilbert, 1986) Berger, 1999; Oxytricha granulifera Foissner & Adam, 1983; Oxytricha granulosa Schmitz, 1986; Oxytricha halophila Kahl, 1932; Oxytricha hymenostoma Stokes, 1887; Oxytricha islandica Berger & Foissner, 1989; Oxytricha kahlovata Berger, 1999; Oxytricha lanceolata Shibuya, 1930; Oxytricha longa Gelei & Szabados, 1950; Oxytricha longicirrata Kahl, 1932; Oxytricha longigranulosa Berger & Foissner, 1989; Oxytricha longissima Dragesco & Njine, 1971; Oxytricha matritensis Ramirez-Montesinos & Perez-Silva, 1966; Oxytricha minor (Maskell, 1887) Kahl, 1932; Oxytricha monspessulana (Chatton & Séguéla, 1940) Borror, 1972; Oxytricha multipes Claparède & Lachmann, 1858; Oxytricha multiseta Dragesco, 1966; Oxytricha nauplia Berger & Foissner, 1987; Oxytricha opisthomuscorum Foissner, Blatterer, Berger & Kohmann, 1991; Oxytricha ottowi Foissner, 1996; Oxytricha oxymarina Berger, 1999; Oxytricha parahalophila (Wang & Nie, 1935) Berger, 1999; Oxytricha parallela Engelmann, 1862; Oxytricha parallelis Englemann, 1862; Oxytricha pernix Wrześniowski, 1877; Oxytricha procera Kahl, 1932; Oxytricha proximata Shibuya, 1930; Oxytricha pseudofurcata Berger, 1999; Oxytricha pseudofusiformis Dragesco & Dragesco-Kernéis, 1986; Oxytricha pseudosimilis Hemberger, 1985; Oxytricha quadricirrata Blatterer & Foissner, 1988; Oxytricha rubripuncta Berger & Foissner, 1987; Oxytricha saltans (Cohn, 1866) Rees, 1881; Oxytricha saprobia Kahl, 1932; Oxytricha setigera Stokes, 1891; Oxytricha similis Engelmann, 1862; Oxytricha siseris Vuxanovici, 1963; Oxytricha sphagni Kahl, 1932; Oxytricha tenella Song & Wilbert, 1989; Oxytricha tricornis Milne, 1886; Oxytricha variabilis Grolière, 1975; Oxytricha acuminata Dumas, 1930 (taxon inquirendum); Oxytricha acuminata Mahajan, 1977 (taxon inquirendum); Oxytricha acuminata Vuxanovici, 1963 (taxon inquirendum); Oxytricha ambigua Dujardin, 1841 (taxon inquirendum); Oxytricha anca Dumas, 1930 (taxon inquirendum); Oxytricha arcuata Dumas, 1930 (taxon inquirendum); Oxytricha barbula Dumas, 1930 (taxon inquirendum); Oxytricha becciformis Dumas, 1929 (taxon inquirendum); Oxytricha bilobata Fromentel, 1876 (taxon inquirendum); Oxytricha cornipes Dumas, 1929 (taxon inquirendum); Oxytricha cornuta Dumas, 1929 (taxon inquirendum); Oxytricha curta Dumas, 1929 (taxon inquirendum); Oxytricha cypris Dumas, 1929 (taxon inquirendum); Oxytricha decumana Perty, 1852 (taxon inquirendum); Oxytricha deformis Fromentel, 1876 (taxon inquirendum); Oxytricha dubia O. F. M. - Kovaleva & Golemansky, 1979 (taxon inquirendum); Oxytricha dujardiniana Diesing, 1866 (taxon inquirendum); Oxytricha ehrenbergiana Diesing, 1866 (taxon inquirendum); Oxytricha ephippioïdes Dumas, 1929 (taxon inquirendum); Oxytricha exociformis Dumas, 1930 (taxon inquirendum); Oxytricha fimbriata Dumas, 1930 (taxon inquirendum); Oxytricha formosa Alekperov, 1984 (taxon inquirendum); Oxytricha furcatus Smith, 1897 (taxon inquirendum); Oxytricha galeata Dumas, 1929 (taxon inquirendum); Oxytricha gyrinioïdes Dumas, 1929 (taxon inquirendum); Oxytricha hengshanensis Liu et al., 1992 in Shen, Liu, Song & Gu, 1992 (taxon inquirendum); Oxytricha immemorata Alekperov, 1984 (taxon inquirendum); Oxytricha incrassata Dujardin, 1841 (taxon inquirendum); Oxytricha labiata Dumas, 1930 (taxon inquirendum); Oxytricha labiata Fromentel, 1876 (taxon inquirendum); Oxytricha lacerata Dumas, 1929 (taxon inquirendum); Oxytricha lacrimula Dumas, 1929 (taxon inquirendum); Oxytricha lata Sterki, 1878 (taxon inquirendum); Oxytricha lingua Dujardin, 1841 (taxon inquirendum); Oxytricha longipes Dumas, 1930 (taxon inquirendum); Oxytricha luteolucens Dumas, 1937 (taxon inquirendum); Oxytricha merula Fromentel, 1876 (taxon inquirendum); Oxytricha monstrosa Vuxanovici, 1963 (taxon inquirendum); Oxytricha nova Klobutcher, Swanton, Donini & Prescott, 1981 (taxon inquirendum); Oxytricha oblonga Dumas, 1929 (taxon inquirendum); Oxytricha oblongatus Sharma, Sobti & Kathuria, 1986 (taxon inquirendum); Oxytricha obtusa Dumas, 1930 (taxon inquirendum); Oxytricha oltenica Lepsi, 1965 (taxon inquirendum); Oxytricha ovalis Schmarda, 1854 (taxon inquirendum); Oxytricha ovata Dumas, 1929 (taxon inquirendum); Oxytricha pisciunculiformis Dumas, 1929 (taxon inquirendum); Oxytricha pistilloides Dumas, 1929 (taxon inquirendum); Oxytricha pleuronectes Dumas, 1929 (taxon inquirendum); Oxytricha plicata Eichwald, 1852 (taxon inquirendum); Oxytricha praeceps Dumas, 1930 (taxon inquirendum); Oxytricha proboscis Dumas, 1930 (taxon inquirendum); Oxytricha protensa Perty, 1852 (taxon inquirendum); Oxytricha quadrinucleata Culberson, 1986 (taxon inquirendum); Oxytricha quercineti Lepsi, 1948 (taxon inquirendum); Oxytricha radians Dujardin, 1841 (taxon inquirendum); Oxytricha rostrata Dumas, 1930 (taxon inquirendum); Oxytricha saltans Vuxanovici, 1963 (taxon inquirendum); Oxytricha stratiformis Dumas, 1930 (taxon inquirendum); Oxytricha striata Schmarda, 1854 (taxon inquirendum); Oxytricha subcylindrica Dumas, 1929 (taxon inquirendum); Oxytricha tetranucleata Németh in Gelei, 1950 (taxon inquirendum); Oxytricha truncata Vuxanovici, 1963 (taxon inquirendum); Oxytricha viridis Fromentel, 1876 (taxon inquirendum)

= Oxytricha =

Genus of single-celled organisms

Oxytricha is a genus of ciliates in the family Oxytrichidae.

== Genomics ==
The draft macronuclear genome of Oxytricha trifallax was published in 2013.

== Species ==
- Oxytricha aeruginosa
- Oxytricha atypica sp. nov.
- Oxytricha bifaria
- Oxytricha chlorelligera
- Oxytricha discifera
- Oxytricha elegans
- Oxytricha fallax
- Oxytricha ferruginea
- Oxytricha furcata
- Oxytricha gibba
- Oxytricha granulifera
- Oxytricha halophila
- Oxytricha hymenostoma
- Oxytricha kahlovata
- Oxytricha lanceolata
- Oxytricha longa
- Oxytricha longigranulosa
- Oxytricha ludibunda
- Oxytricha marina
- Oxytricha minor
- Oxytricha ottowi
- Oxytricha ovalis
- Oxytricha oxymarina
- Oxytricha parallelis
- Oxytricha pellionella
- Oxytricha rubra
- Oxytricha saltans
- Oxytricha setigera
- Oxytricha susheelum
- Oxytricha tricornis
- Oxytricha trifallax
- Oxytricha velox
