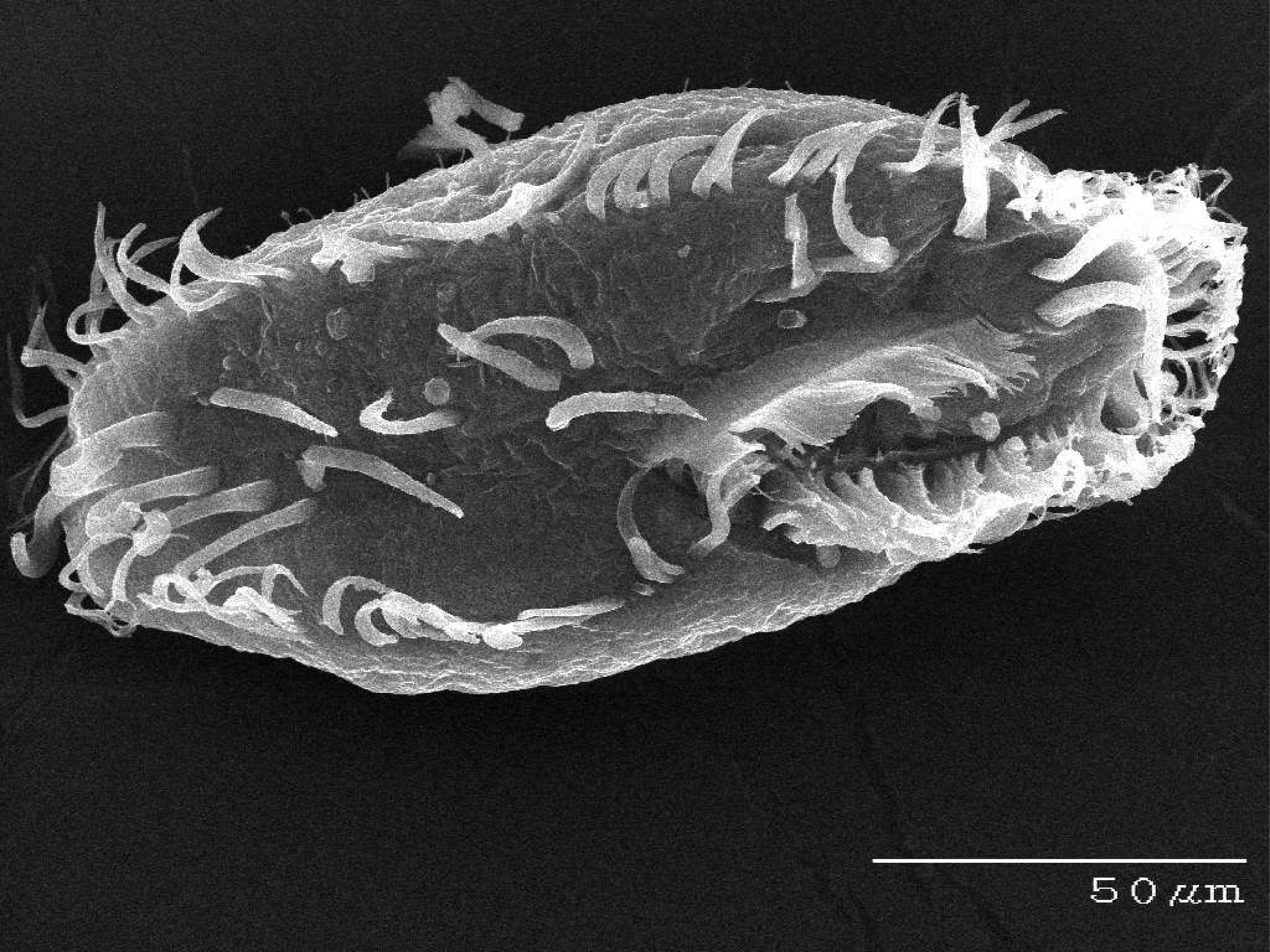

Scientific classification
- Domain: Eukaryota
- Clade: Sar
- Clade: Alveolata
- Phylum: Ciliophora
- Class: Spirotrichea
- Family: Oxytrichidae
- Genus: Sterkiella
- Species: S. histriomuscorum

Binomial name
- Sterkiella histriomuscorum (Foissner, Blatterer, Berger & Kohmann, 1991) Foissner, Blatterer, Berger & Kohmann, 1991

Synonyms
- Histriculus muscorum (Kahl, 1932) Corliss, 1960; Histrio macrostoma Gellért & Tamás, 1958; Histrio muscorum Kahl, 1932; Opisthotricha terrestris Horváth, 1956; Oxytricha histrioides Gellért, 1957; Oxytricha histriomuscorum Foissner, Blatterer, Berger & Kohmann, 1991; Oxytricha terrestris (Horwath, 1958) Dragesco & Dragesco-Kernéis, 1986; Oxytricha trifallax Greslin, Prescott, Oka, Loukin & Chappell, 1989

= Sterkiella histriomuscorum =

Species of single-celled organism

Oxytricha trifallax, also called Sterkiella histriomuscorum, is a ciliate species in the genus Oxytricha, known for its highly fragmented genomes which have been used as a model for ciliate genetics.

== Genetics ==
Like all ciliates, O. trifallax has two different types of nuclei: macronuclei, which are the site of transcription and gene expression, and micronuclei, which are only active during sexual reproduction but are otherwise transcriptionally inactive. Macronuclei are formed by the differentiation of micronuclei, which usually involves some degree of RNA-mediated DNA editing. O. trifallax is the first species sequenced with an unusually high degree of fragmentation in its macronuclear genome. Up to 96% of the micronuclear genome is eliminated during the differentiation into a macronucleus; in comparison, in other ciliates like Paramecium only about 30% is eliminated. The macronuclear genome has a haploid size of about 50 Mbp.

The chromosomes of the macronucleus are also unusually short. The macronuclear genome encodes about 18,500 genes, but these are distributed on 16,000 chromosomes, which are called nanochromosomes due to their length. Because of their unusually short nanochromosomes, most of which contain only a single gene, they have been used as a model organism to study telomeres and to screen for non-coding RNA genes.

The micronuclear genome has also been sequenced, and contains about 3,500 scrambled genes. Scrambled genes are genes whose individual segments are located in different parts of the micronuclear genome, and therefore have to be "unscrambled" during the DNA editing step into a conventional gene in the macronuclear genome. More than 225,000 individual DNA segments have to be unscrambled during the development of a macronuclear genome from its micronuclear precursor.

The mitochondrial genome has also been sequenced, and is the largest known ciliate mitochondrial genome, with a length of about 70 kbp. Like other ciliate mitochondrial genomes, those of O. trifallax are linear molecules and contain a number of split genes. Their mitochondria also possess a separate plasmid, which may have been involved in horizontal gene transfer during the evolution of the mitochondrial genome.

== Taxonomy and systematics ==
The taxonomy of O. trifallax has been contested. It was reclassified as Sterkiella histriomuscorum on the basis of morphological characteristics, but a molecular phylogeny supports the original classification as a species of Oxytricha.
