= Holostichidae =

Scientific classification
- Domain: Eukaryota
- Clade: Sar
- Clade: Alveolata
- Phylum: Ciliophora
- Class: Spirotrichea
- Order: Urostylida
- Family: Holostichidae; Fauré-Fremiet, 1961

Genera
- See text

Family of single-celled organism

Holostichidae is a family of littoral ciliates.

== Genera ==
According to the Catalogue of Life, 10 genera are accepted within Holosticha.

- Afrothrix
- Amphisia
- Amphista
- Anteholosticha
- Birojima
- Caudiholosticha
- Holosticha
- Holostichides
- Periholosticha
- Psammomitra
