= Urostylida =

Scientific classification
- Domain: Eukaryota
- Clade: Sar
- Clade: Alveolata
- Phylum: Ciliophora
- Class: Spirotrichea
- Subclass: Stichotrichia
- Order: Urostylida; Jankowski, 1979

Families
- See text

Order of single-celled organisms

Urostylida is an order of littoral ciliates. The taxonomy of the order is largely unresolved and still subject to scientific inquiry.

== Families ==
According to the Catalogue of Life, nine families are accepted within Urostylida.

- Bakuellidae
- Holostichidae
- Kahliellidae
- Pseudokeronopsidae
- Pseudourostylidae
- Psilotrichidae
- Rigidothrichidae
- Trachelostylidae
- Urostylidae
