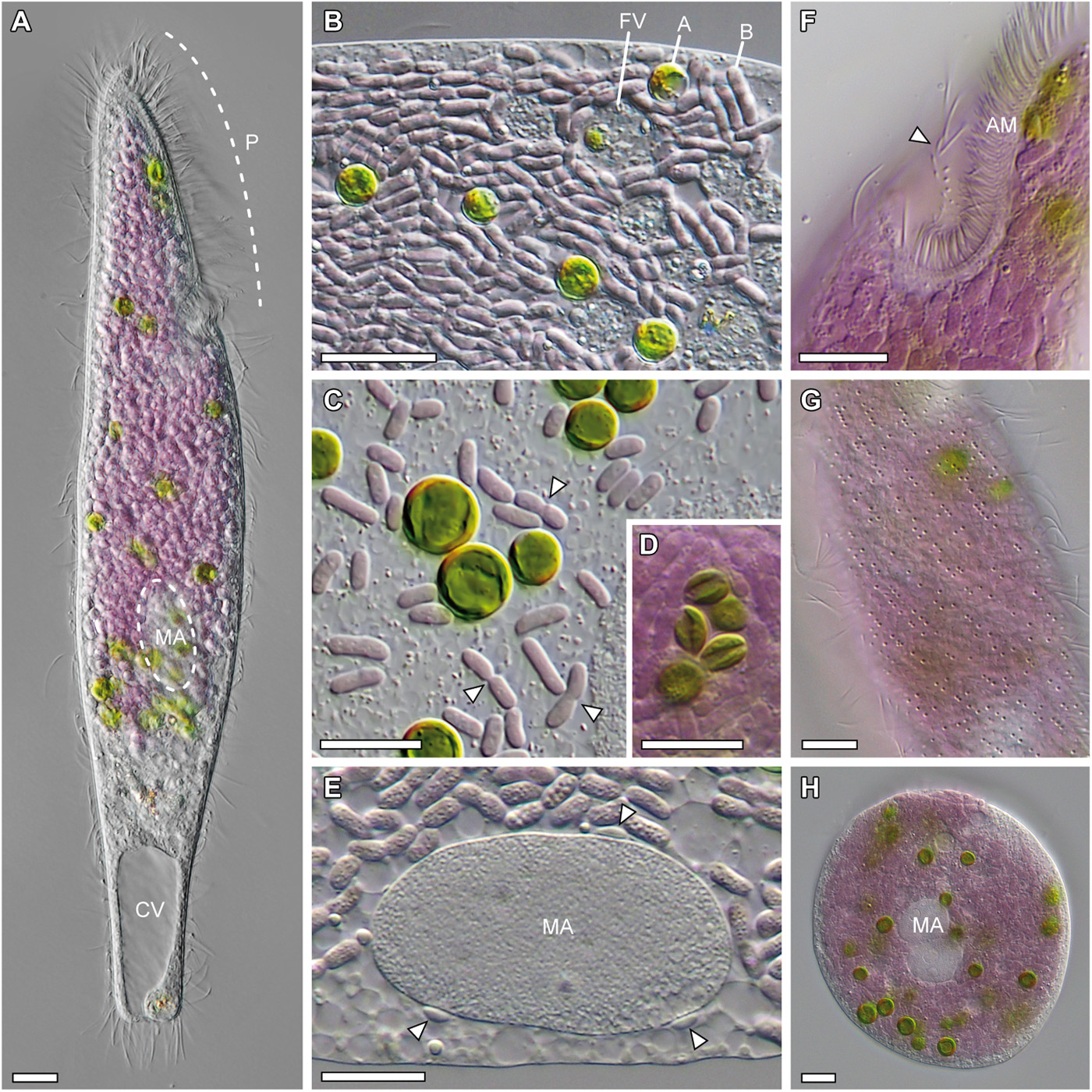
- Pseudoblepharisma tenue with its two photosynthetic symbionts

Scientific classification
- Domain: Eukaryota
- Clade: Sar
- Superphylum: Alveolata
- Phylum: Ciliophora
- Class: Heterotrichea
- Order: Heterotrichida
- Family: Blepharismidae
- Genus: Pseudoblepharisma; Kahl 1926

Species
- See text

= Pseudoblepharisma =

Genus of protozoans

Pseudoblepharisma is a genus of heterotrich ciliates inhabiting oxygen-depleted freshwater habitats. Most sources report that it contains one species, Pseudoblepharisma tenue, but at least four have been seen in literature.

The ciliate likely prefer an aerobic environment when in the dark, and because it is mixotrophic, it is hypothesized its anoxygenic photosynthesising bacterial endosymbionts allows it to enter anoxic environments where it will have access to the microbial prey living there.

European reports also mentioned a variant P. tenue var. viride, which only has green symbionts. In 2022, one strain matching these descriptions was found in tropical freshwaters of Florida, North America. Unlike the bicolor European counterpart, it builds a lorica (shell) around itself.

The current taxonomy (under Blepharismidae) is inconsistent with molecular phylogeny using SSU rRNA; the latter places the genus sister to Spirostomum (Spirostomidae).

== History ==
Pseudoblepharisma tenue was originally described in Germany as Blepharisma tenuis. It was discovered by biologist Alfred Kahl in 1926 in the Simmelried moorland near Konstanz, and was then ignored for decades. Starting in 2006, it was recognized that the German strain may have two bacterial symbionts: one pink, one green.

== Endosymbionts ==
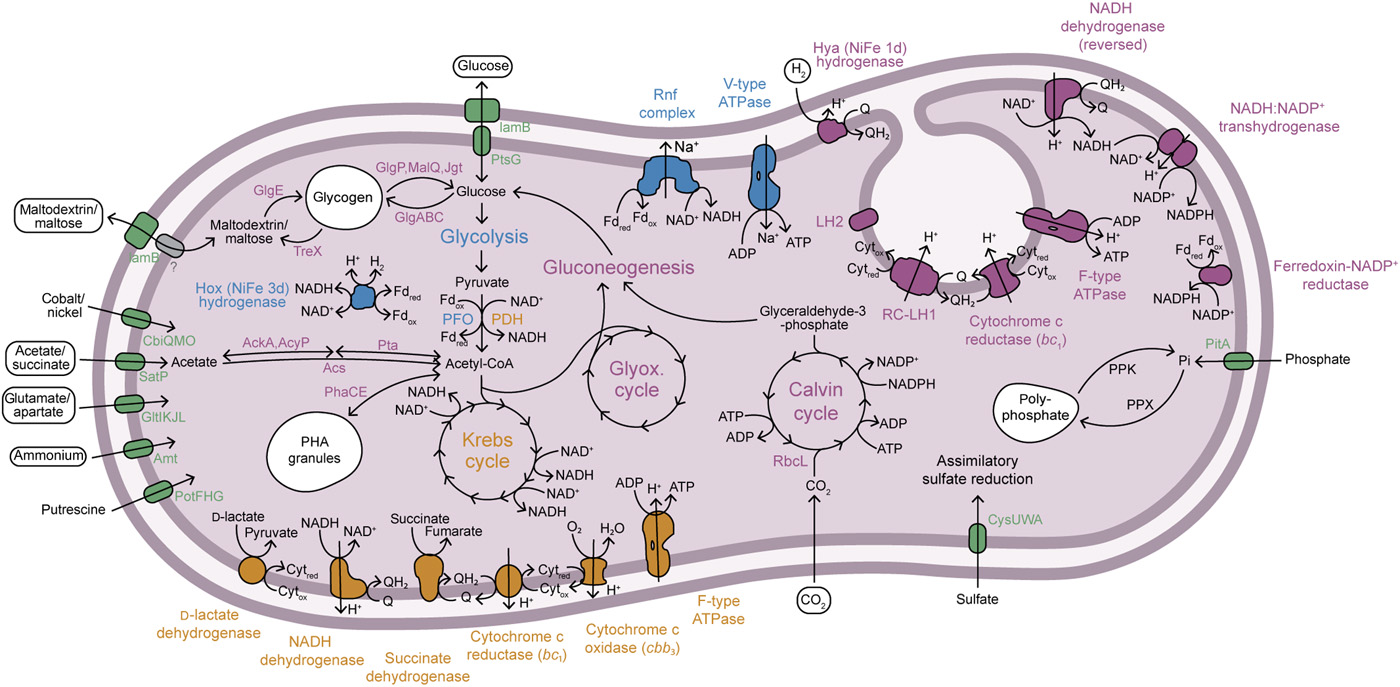
Inferred physiology and energy metabolism of the purple endosymbiont "Ca. Thiodictyon intracellulare" of Pseudoblepharisma tenue. Protein complexes are colored based on one of three processes: photosynthesis in purple, microaerobic respiration in orange, and fermentation in blue. Metabolite transporters are shown in green. Sources of nitrogen, carbon and electrons, and potential photosynthate, are boxed in rounded rectangles.

In 2021, both symbionts were confirmed to be photosynthetic: Chlorella sp. K10 (green algae), discovered earlier as a symbiont of Hydra viridissima; and "Ca. Thiodictyon intracellulare" (Chromatiaceae), a purple sulfur bacterium. The complexity of such a tripartite symbiosis is novel to science.

The purple bacterium is the first-discovered photosynthetic endosymbiote not derived from cyanobacteria. It has a genome just half the size of their closest known relatives, and has lost genes essential for nitrogen and sulfur metabolism as well as the ability to use hydrogen sulfide as an electron donor for photosynthesis.
