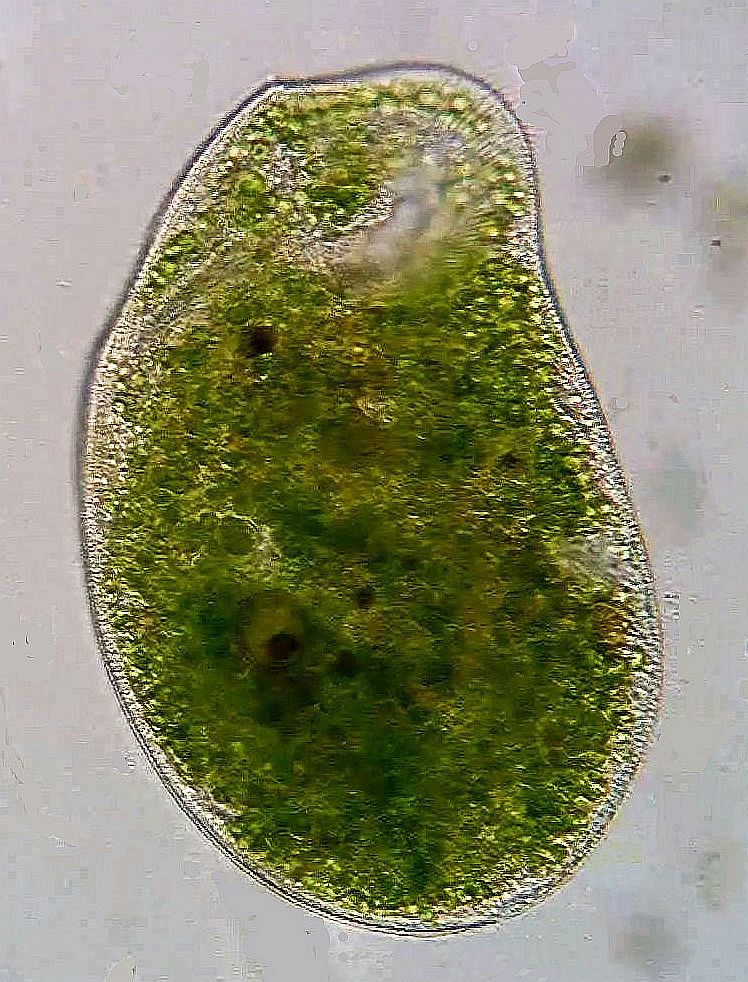

Scientific classification
- Domain: Eukaryota
- Clade: Sar
- Clade: Alveolata
- Phylum: Ciliophora
- Class: Heterotrichea
- Order: Heterotrichida
- Family: Climacostomidae
- Genus: Climacostomum
- Species: C. virens

Binomial name
- Climacostomum virens (Ehrenberg, 1834) Stein, 1859

= Climacostomum virens =

Species of single-celled organism

Climacostomum virens is a species of unicellular ciliate protists. It is one of just two formally described species in the genus Climacostomum.

== Description ==
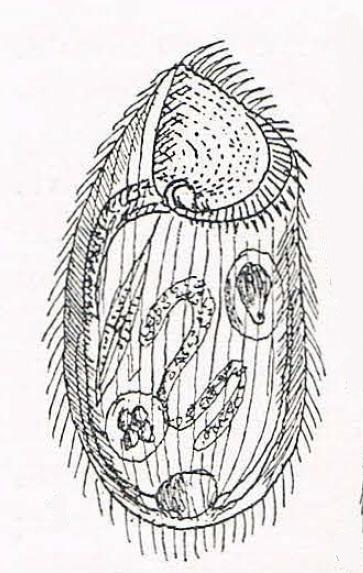
Climacostomum virens, from Alfred Kahl, 1932

Climacostomum virens has a flexible but non-contractile body, 100–300 micrometres (0.0039–0.0118 in) long, roughly ovoid or harp-shaped, and flattened from back to front. It has a large posterior contractile vacuole, and a characteristic posterior indentation, or dimple, that is more pronounced in underfed individuals. The posterior vacuole surrounds the cytoproct (anus), through which food waste is eliminated. The macronucleus of Climacostomum virens is normally long and wormlike (vermiform).

The cell's most prominent feature is its large oral apparatus, which occupies most of the anterior region. This structure features an adoral zone of membranelles (AZM) partly encircling a wide buccal cavity (mouth), which opens into the cytopharyngeal pouch where digestive vacuoles are formed before they travel down a distinctive long, bent tube into the body of the cell.

Members of the species are normally green, because of symbiotic algae (zoochlorellae) that live in the cytoplasm. When individuals are grown in the dark, these algal endosymbionts are reduced in number and the cytoplasm may appear colorless.

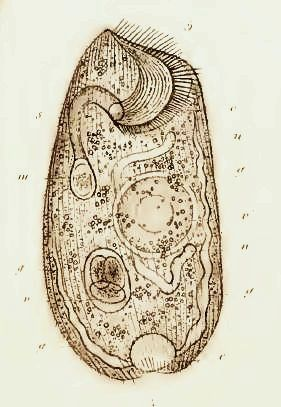
Climacostomum, from Friedrich Stein, 1859

== Classification ==
The species Climacostomum virens was first described in 1833 by Christian Gottfried Ehrenberg, under the name Spirostomum virens. In 1859, Samuel Friedrich von Stein moved Spirostomum virens to a new genus, which he named Climacostomum. In his Manual of Infusoria (1880), William Saville-Kent rejected Stein's genus, assigning the species instead to Leucophrys patula, which he described as synonymous with Ehrenberg's Spirostomum virens and Leucophrys patula, as well as the Trichoda patula of O.F. Muller. However, the genus was retained by later researchers, including Alfred Kahl.
