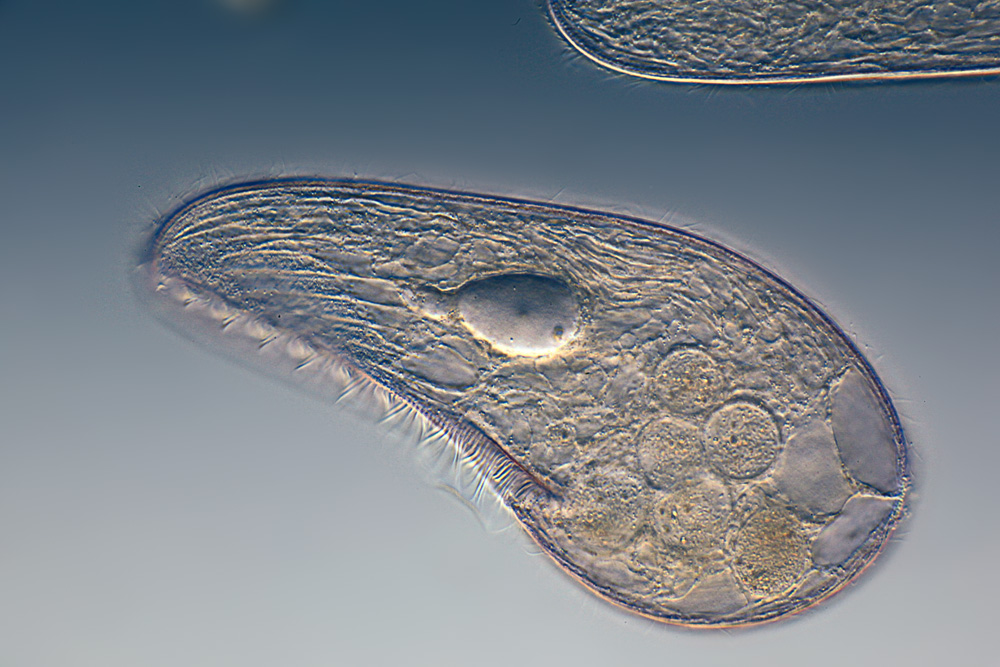

Scientific classification
- Domain: Eukaryota
- Clade: Sar
- Clade: Alveolata
- Phylum: Ciliophora
- Class: Heterotrichea
- Order: Heterotrichida
- Family: Blepharismidae
- Genus: Blepharisma
- Species: B. japonicum

Binomial name
- Blepharisma japonicum (Suzuki, 1954)

= Blepharisma japonicum =

Species of single-celled organism

Blepharisma japonicum is a species of protozoan that can be found either in water or soil in Japan.

== Description ==
The body of an organism is elongated and ovoided. It has a curved anterior apex that is over the peristome. It has a cytostome which is a two-layered undulating membrane, on the right front edge, and also contractile vacuole with cytopyge terminal. It is either brown or rose-coloured.

== Conjugation ==
Blepharisma japonicum produces sexual pheromones that promote conjugation. There are two mating types (I and II), each type excreting a specific pheromone (termed gamone 1 and gamone 2, respectively). When sexually mature mating-type I cells are moderately starved, they autonomously produce and secrete gamone I. Gamone 1 specifically acts on mating-type II cells, transforming them so that they can unite with type I cells, and inducing them to secrete gamone 2. Gamone 2 then transforms type I cells so that they can unite with type II cells. Cells that can unite may then undergo conjugation. Sexual reproduction involving interaction of opposite mating types promotes outcrossing and the masking of deleterious recessive mutations in the diploid stage of the sexual life cycle.
