= Richard Hesse =

German zoologist and ecologist

Richard Hesse (20 February 1868 in Nordhausen – 28 December 1944 in Berlin) was a German zoologist and ecologist.

Hesse took his PhD in 1892 from the University of Tübingen and was subsequently appointed lecturer, later extraordinary professor (1901) of zoology at the same university. In 1909, he became professor of zoology at the Landwirtschaftliche Hochschule Berlin (Agricultural University of Berlin) and in 1914 at the University of Bonn. From 1926 to 1935, he was a professor and director of the zoological institute at the University of Berlin.

Hesse worked in the spirit of Karl August Möbius with biogeography and ecology of vertebrates. He published Tierbau und Tierleben [translated title: Animal form and life] in 1910 together with Franz Theodor Doflein. In 1924, he published his Tiergeographie auf Ökologischer Grundlage. The title of this work paraphrases Schimper's classical Pflanzengeographie auf Physiologischer Grundlage (1898). The book was translated to English as Ecological Animal Geography (1937, 1951) by W.C. Allee and Karl P. Schmidt.
