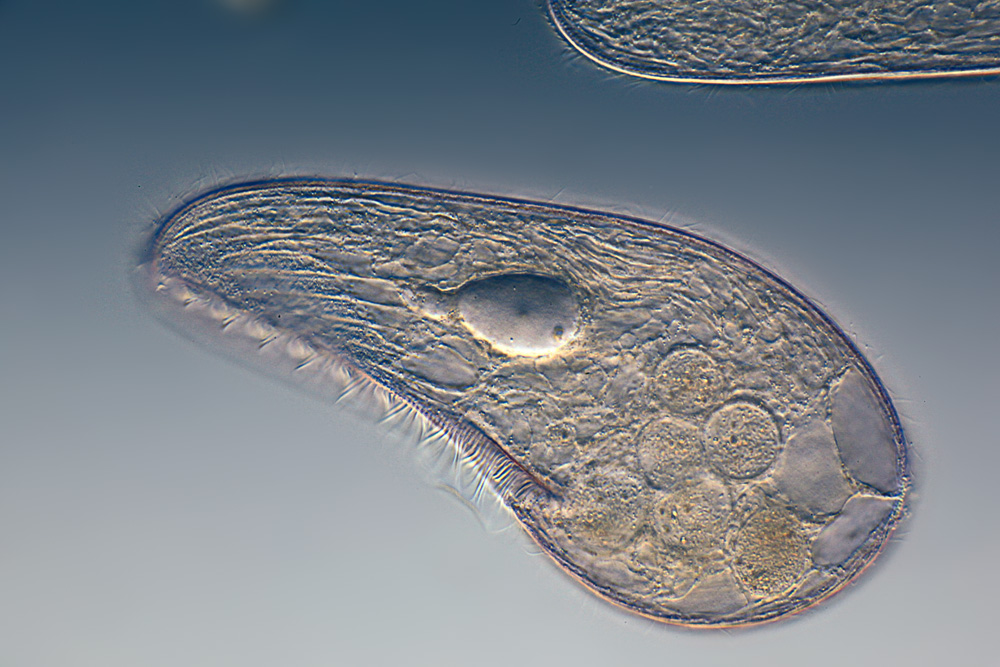
- Blepharisma japonicum

Scientific classification
- Domain: Eukaryota
- Clade: Sar
- Clade: Alveolata
- Phylum: Ciliophora
- Class: Heterotrichea
- Order: Heterotrichida
- Family: Blepharismidae
- Genus: Blepharisma; Perty, 1852

= Blepharisma =

Genus of single-celled organisms

Blepharisma is a genus of unicellular ciliate protists found in fresh and salt water. The group includes around 40 accepted species, and many sub-varieties and strains. While species vary considerably in size and shape, most are easily identified by their red or pinkish color, which is caused by granules of the pigment blepharismin.

All members of the genus possess a long series of membranelles on the left side of the oral groove, and an "undulating membrane" (a structure resembling a flap, scarf or small sail, composed of long cilia fused together as a single sheet) on the right side of the peristome, toward the posterior.

Certain species of Blepharisma have served as model organisms for scientific research. Since some varieties are easily cultured and readily available from scientific supply houses, they are a common object of study in school science classes.

== Appearance ==
Blepharisma may be as small as 50 micrometres in length, or as large as 1 mm (though normal size range is between 75 and 300 micrometres). Body shape varies within the genus. The type species of the genus, B. persicinum, is ellipsoidal. Blepharisma lateritium is teardrop-shaped, with a rounded posterior; while Blepharisma elongatum and Blepharisma sphagni are long and thin, tapering at the posterior into a tail-like point.

All species are uniformly ciliated, with the cilia arranged in longitudinal rows, and stripes of pigment alternating between rows of cilia. Cilia, short hairlike organelles, sweep food into its mouth and are used for movement. The pink or red pigmentation may be quite pale, and in certain cases it is absent altogether. A contractile vacuole, often quite large, is located in the posterior. The macronuclei can take a variety of forms. Depending on species and phase of life, they may be rod-shaped, ovoid, spherical, or moniliform (like a rosary, or string of beads).

== Reproduction and sexual phenomena ==
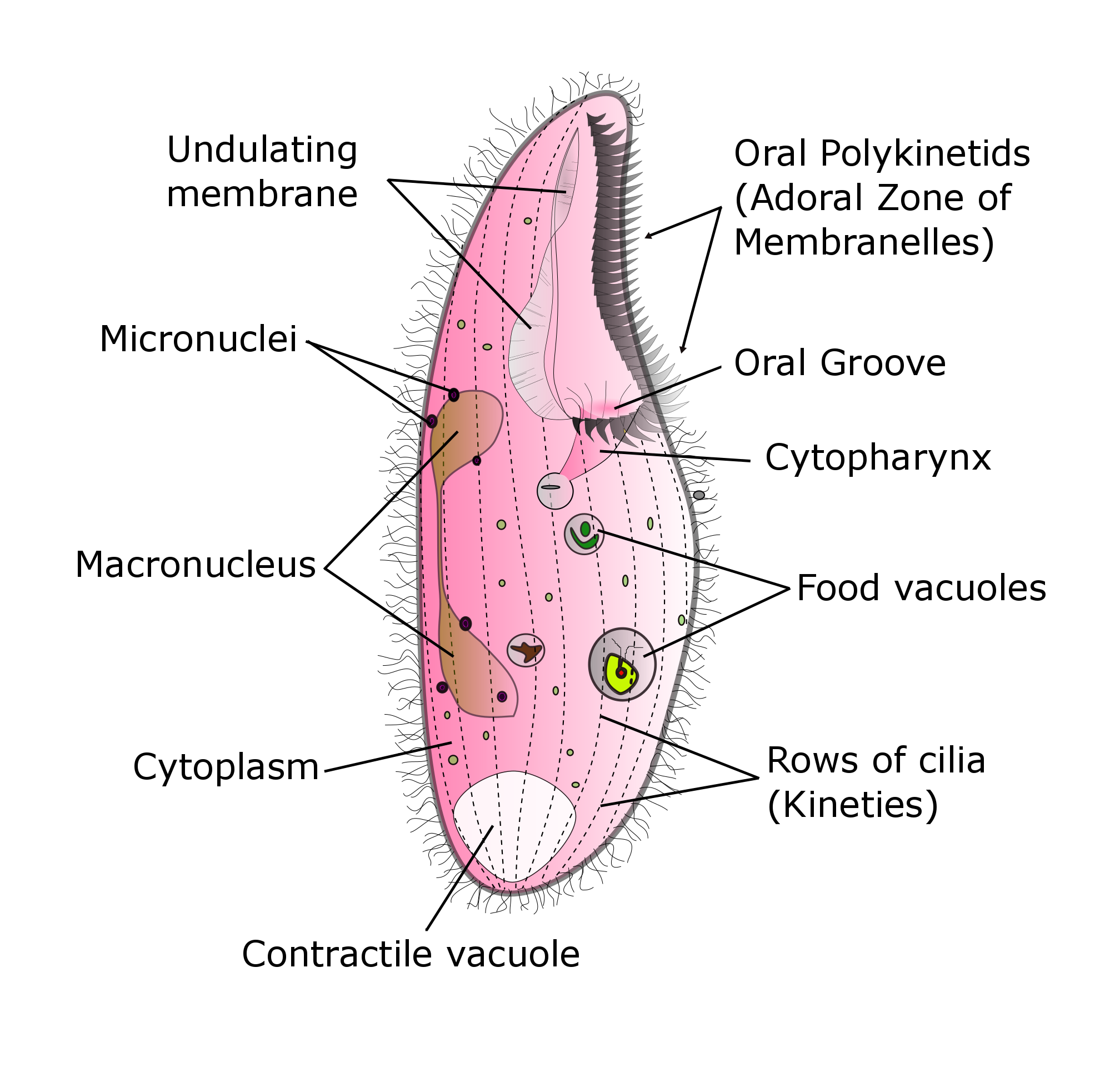
Blepharisma morphology

Like all ciliates, Blepharisma reproduce asexually, by binary fission, dividing transversally. Fission may occur spontaneously, as part of the vegetative cell cycle, or it may follow a sexual phenomenon called conjugation, a process through which genetic material is exchanged between cells. In conjugation, two organisms come into close contact, and a temporary cytoplasmic bridge forms between them. The micronuclei of each cell then undergo meiosis, and haploid micronuclei pass from one individual to the other. This permits the reshuffling of hereditary characteristics, as in other types of sexual reproduction. Conjugation is immediately followed by binary fission of the two conjugants.

In Blepharisma, as in some other ciliates, chemical substances called gamones are used to induce conjugation by stimulating interaction between compatible mating partners.

Although clonal cells of Blepharisma are sometimes able to conjugate with one another (a phenomenon known as selfing), conjugation ordinarily involves the interaction of cells of different mating types. In the species Blepharisma japonicum, there are two mating types (I and II), each type excreting a specific pheromone (termed gamone 1 and gamone 2, respectively). When sexually mature mating-type I cells are moderately starved, they autonomously produce and secrete gamone I. Gamone 1 specifically acts on mating-type II cells, transforming them so that they can unite with type I cells, and inducing them to secrete gamone 2. Gamone 2 then transforms type I cells so that they can unite with type II cells. Cells that can unite may then undergo conjugation. Conjugation of opposite mating types promotes outcrossing and the masking of deleterious recessive mutations in the diploid phase of the sexual cycle.

== Feeding and behavior ==
Blepharisma feed on a variety of smaller organisms, including bacteria, flagellate algae, rotifers, other ciliates and even smaller members of the same species. Experiments with Blepharisma undulans have shown that cannibalism causes gigantism. When individuals are given a diet of smaller Blepharisma, or certain ciliates (particularly Colpidium colpoda or Tetrahymena), they grow to a relatively enormous size. As long as their diet remains unchanged, cannibal giants will divide to produce more giants. When large prey become unavailable, the offspring will revert to normal size.

=== Photobiology ===
Blepharismin C

Names
- IUPAC name 5,7,11,13,17,19,23,25-octahydroxy-15-(4-hydroxyphenyl)-6,24-di(propan-2-yl)octacyclo[14.11.1.1^{2,10}.0^{3,8}.0^{4,26}.0^{20,28}.0^{22,27}.0^{14,29}]nonacosa-1,3,5,7,10(29),11,13,16,18,20(28),22,24,26-tridecaene-9,21-dione

Identifiers
CAS Number	129898-49-3
3D model (JSmol)	Interactive image
ChemSpider	9942356
PubChem CID	11767671
- InChI: InChI=1S/C41H30O11/c1-11(2)19-36(47)32-30-28-26-22(15(43)9-17(45)24(26)40(51)34(30)38(19)49)21(13-5-7-14(42)8-6-13)23-16(44)10-18(46)25-27(23)29(28)31-33(32)37(48)20(12(3)4)39(50)35(31)41(25)52/h5-12,21,42-50H,1-4H3 Key: FRDONCXLMWOCKJ-UHFFFAOYSA-N
- SMILES: CC(C)C1=C(C2=C3C4=C5C6=C(C(=CC(=C6C(C7=C(C=C(C(=C74)C(=O)C3=C1O)O)O)C8=CC=C(C=C8)O)O)O)C(=O)C9=C(C(=C(C2=C59)O)C(C)C)O)O

Properties
Chemical formula	C_{41}H_{30}O_{11}
Molar mass	698.680 g·mol^{−1}
- Except where otherwise noted, data are given for materials in their standard state (at 25 °C [77 °F], 100 kPa). Infobox references

Blepharisma are markedly photophobic, and when light levels are increased will seek out darkened areas. The ability to detect light is accomplished with photosensitive pigment granules located just under the plasma membrane of the cell. The pigment in these granules is blepharismin, the same substance that gives Blepharisma their characteristic pinkish color. Blepharisma are usually pink when collected in nature, but when grown in darkness with abundant food they turn red. Exposure to light or starvation causes them to lose their color, but deeply pigmented cells can even be killed by strong light.

== List of species ==
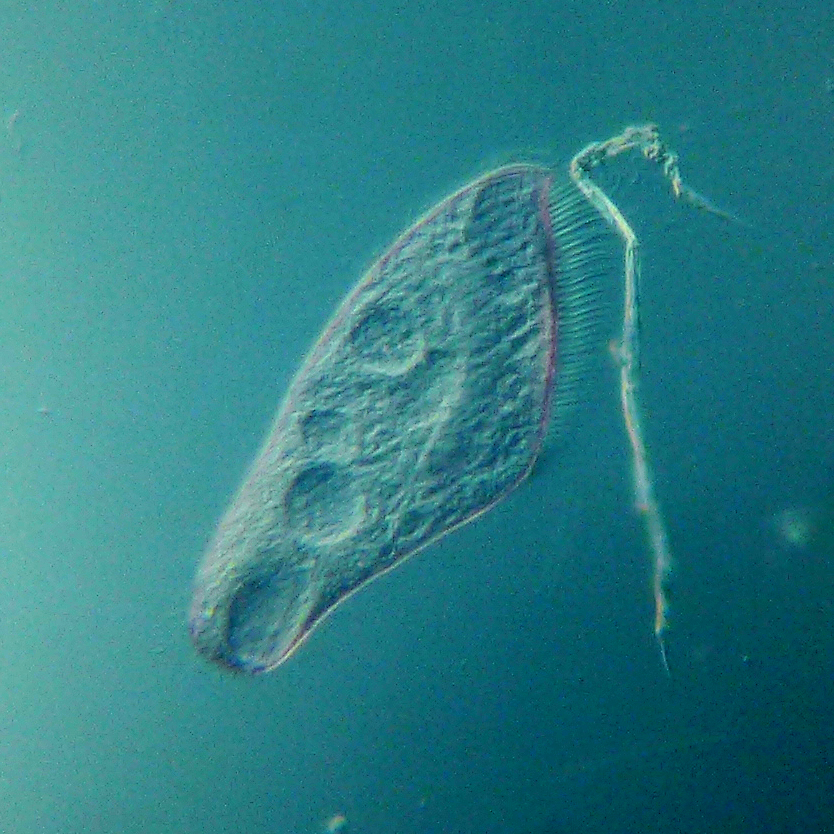
Blepharisma hyalinum

Blepharisma americanum swimming in a drop of pond water, with other microorganisms

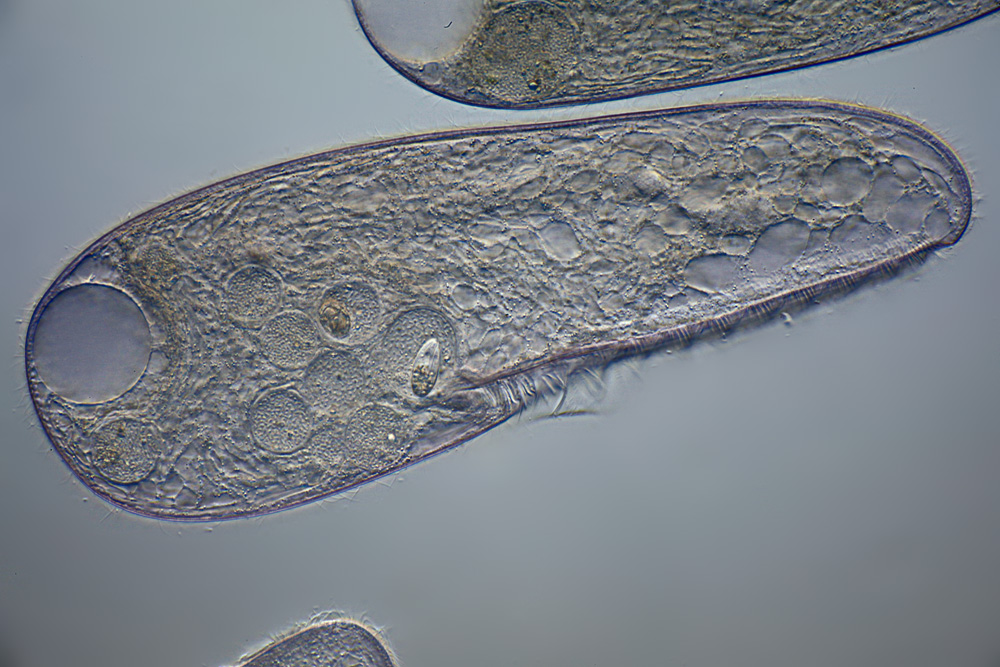
Blepharisma japonicum

- B. americanum Suzuki, 1954
- B. bimicronucleatum Villeneuve-Brachon 1940
- B. bothrostoma Mermod 1914
- B. botezati Lepsi, 1926
- B. coeruleum Gajevskaja, 1927
- B. caudatus Dumas 1937
- B. clarissimum Kahl, 1928
- B. dawsoni Christie & Hirshfield 1967
- B. dileptus Kahl, 1928
- B. elegans Vuxanovici 1963
- B. elongatum (Stokes, 1884) Kahl, 1926
- B. falcatum Gelei 1954
- B. galianoi Fernandez-Leborans 1979
- B. grayi Hartwig & Parker, 1977
- B. halophila Ruinen 1938
  - Found to be a phylogenetic outlier under the orthographical variant Blepharisma halophilum
- B. hyalinum Perty, 1852
- B. intermedium Bhandary, 1962
- B. ichthyoides V. Gelei, 1933
- B. japonicum (Suzuki, 1954) Giese, 1973
- B. lateritium (Ehrenberg, 1831) Kahl, 1932
- B. lentis Gelei 1954
- B. melana Borror, 1963
- B. minima Lepsi, 1926
- B. multinucleata Dragesco, 1960
- B. musculus Penard, 1922
- B. ovalis Dumas 1937
- B. ovatum Penard, 1922
- B. parasalinarum Dragesco 1997
- B. persicinum Perty, 1849
- B. salinarum Florentin, 1899
- B. seshachari Bhandary, 1962
- B. sphagni Lepsi, 1926
- B. steini Kahl, 1932
- B. tardum Kahl, 1928
- B. undulans Stein, 1868
- B. velatum Vacelet, 1961
- B. vestitum Kahl, 1928
- B. violaceae Tucolesco 1962
- B. vitreum Lepsi 1957
- B. wardsi Hirshfield, Isquith & Bhandary, 1965
