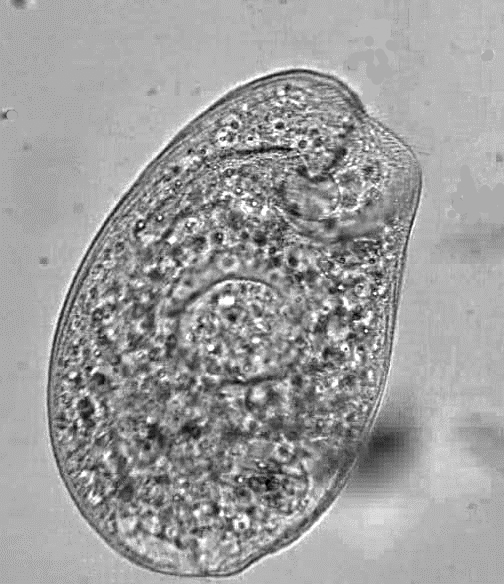
- Climacostomum sp.

Scientific classification
- Domain: Eukaryota
- Clade: Sar
- Clade: Alveolata
- Phylum: Ciliophora
- Class: Heterotrichea
- Order: Heterotrichida
- Family: Climacostomidae
- Genus: Climacostomum; Stein, 1859

Species
- Climacostomum gigas Meunier, 1907; Climacostomum virens Ehrenberg, 1833

= Climacostomum =

Genus of single-celled organisms

Climacostomum is a genus of unicellular ciliates, belonging to the class Heterotrichea.

The genus has one well-described species, Climacostomum virens, which usually carries a symbiotic alga, a variety of Chlorella that can be cultivated outside its host. Algae-free (aposymbiotic) individuals are known, and a species that lacks algal symbionts, Climacostomum gigas Meunier 1907, has been identified, but not confirmed in recent literature.

In its cortex, Climacostomum virens has colorless granules structurally similar to the defensive pigmentocysts found in its fellow Heterotrichs, Stentor coreuleus and Blepharisma japonicum. When Climacostomum is threatened by a predator, such as the ciliate Dileptus margaritifer, these cortical cysts release a defensive cytotoxin called Climacostol. This substance has been synthesized in the laboratory and found to be highly toxic to certain species of ciliates. It is believed that this toxicity is accomplished by the inhibition of mitochondrial respiration. It has been shown to have toxic effects on certain human cancer cells.

== Appearance and characteristics ==
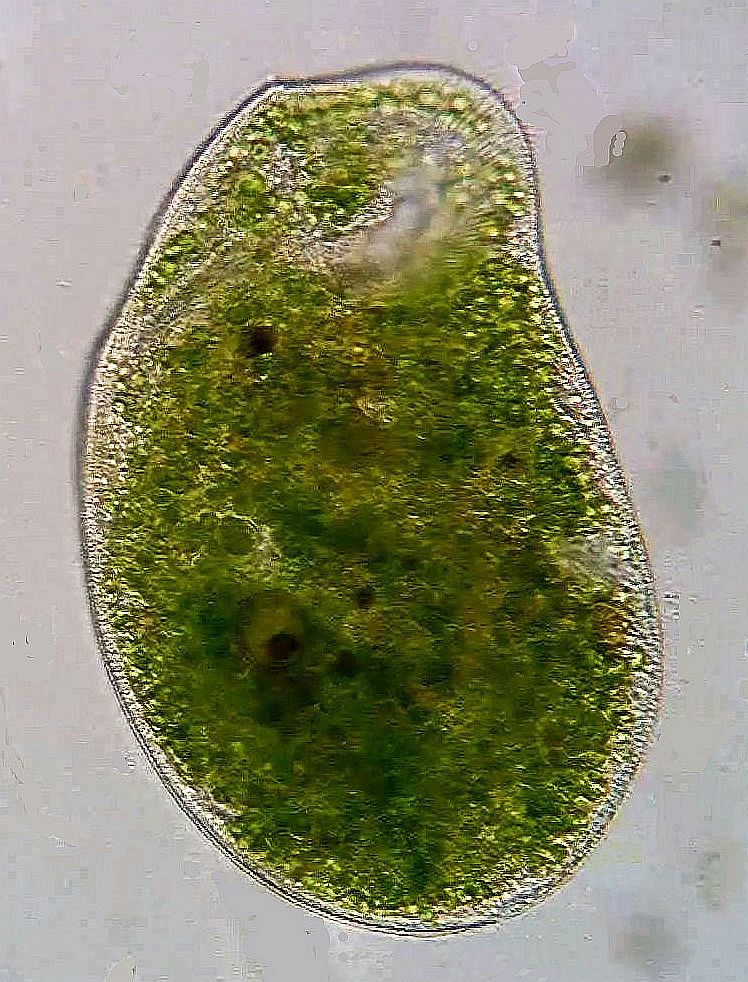
Climacostomum virens

The body is somewhat flexible but non-contractile, roughly ovoid or harp-shaped, and flattened from back to front. It has a large posterior contractile vacuole, and a characteristic posterior indentation (more pronounced in underfed individuals). The posterior vacuole surrounds the cytoproct (anus), through which food waste is eliminated. The macronucleus of Climacostomum virens is normally long and wormlike (vermiform). Climacostomum gigas is reported to have a compact, ovoid macronucleus.

The cell's most prominent feature is its large oral apparatus, which occupies most of the anterior region. This structure features an adoral zone of membranelles (AZM) partly encircling a wide oral cavity which opens into the cytopharyngeal pouch where digestive vacuoles are formed before they travel down the long, bent cytopharyngeal tube into the body of the cell.

Climacostomum is found in fresh or brackish water, and feeds on suspended particles, such as bacteria and small flagellates.

When Climacostomum virens is grown in the dark, the algal endosymbionts normally found in it are reduced in number and the cytoplasm appears colorless. Peck et al. report that these are not contained within a membrane, but are in direct contact with the host's cytoplasm; however, other observers have noted the presence of perialgal vacuoles around the algae.

== Classification ==
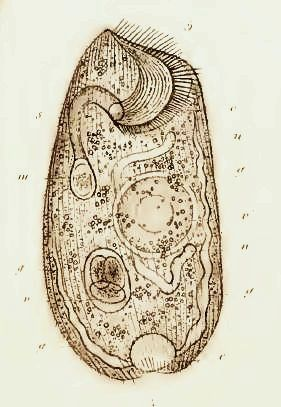
Climacostomum, from Friedrich Stein, Der Organismus der Infusionsthiere, 1859

The species Climacostomum virens was first described in 1833 by Christian Gottfried Ehrenberg, under the name Spirostomum virens. In 1859, Samuel Friedrich von Stein moved Spirostomum virens to a new genus, which he called Climacostomum. In his Manual of Infusoria (1880), William Saville-Kent rejected Stein's genus, assigning the species instead to Leucophrys patula, which he described as synonymous with Ehrenberg's Spirostomum virens and Leucophrys patula, as well as the Trichoda patula of O.F. Muller. However, the genus was retained by other researchers, including Alfred Kahl.

In a detailed study of its physical characteristics, published in 1972, Arthur J. Repak placed Climacostomum with the genus Fabrea in a new family he named Climacostomidae.

Recently, molecular analyses have shown that, while the Heterotrichea as a whole are a monophyletic group, the taxon Climacostomidae is paraphyletic, the genus Fabrea being more closely related to the ciliates Eufolliculina and Maristentor than to Climacostomum. Among the other Heterotrichs, Climacostomum appears to be most closely related to Chattonidium and Condylostoma.

== Video gallery ==
Climacostomum sp. with no Chlorellae

Climacostomum virens feeding
