= Anton Reichenow =

German ornithologist & herpetologist (1847–1941)

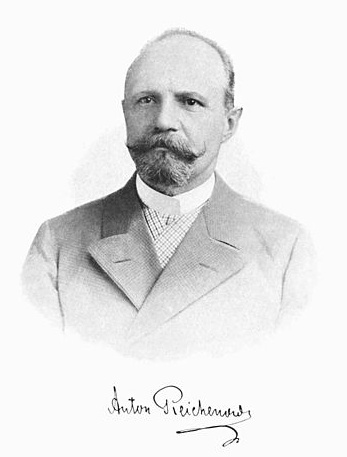
- Born: 1 August 1847; Charlottenburg, Berlin
- Died: 6 July 1941 (aged 93); Hamburg
- Known for: Expertise on African birds and on parrots
- Children: Eduard Reichenow (son)
- Relatives: Jean Cabanis (father-in-law)
- Scientific career
- Fields: Ornithology, herpetology
- Workplaces: Natural History Museum of Berlin
- Author abbrev. (zoology): Reichenow

Anton Reichenow (1 August 1847 in Charlottenburg – 6 July 1941 in Hamburg) was a German ornithologist and herpetologist.

Reichenow was the son-in-law of Jean Cabanis, and worked at the Natural History Museum of Berlin from 1874 to 1921. He was an expert on African birds, making a collecting expedition to West Africa in 1872 and 1873, and writing Die Vögel Afrikas (1900–05). He was also an expert on parrots, describing all species then known in his book Vogelbilder aus Fernen Zonen: Abbildungen und Beschreibungen der Papageien (illustrated by Gustav Mützel, 1839–1893). He also wrote Die Vögel der Bismarckinseln (1899). He was editor of the Journal für Ornithologie from 1894 to 1921.

A number of birds are named after him, including Reichenow's woodpecker and Reichenow's firefinch. His son Eduard Reichenow was a famous protozoologist.

Reichenow is known for his classification of birds into six groups, described, as "shortwings, swimmers, stiltbirds, skinbills, yoketoes, and treebirds". This system was not adopted by any other ornithologists, but is used in the Dewey Decimal System.

Reichenow also worked in the scientific field of herpetology. He is credited with describing a new genus and two new species of frogs, and two new species of lizards. He is commemorated in the scientific name of a species of skink, Lacertaspis reichenowi.
