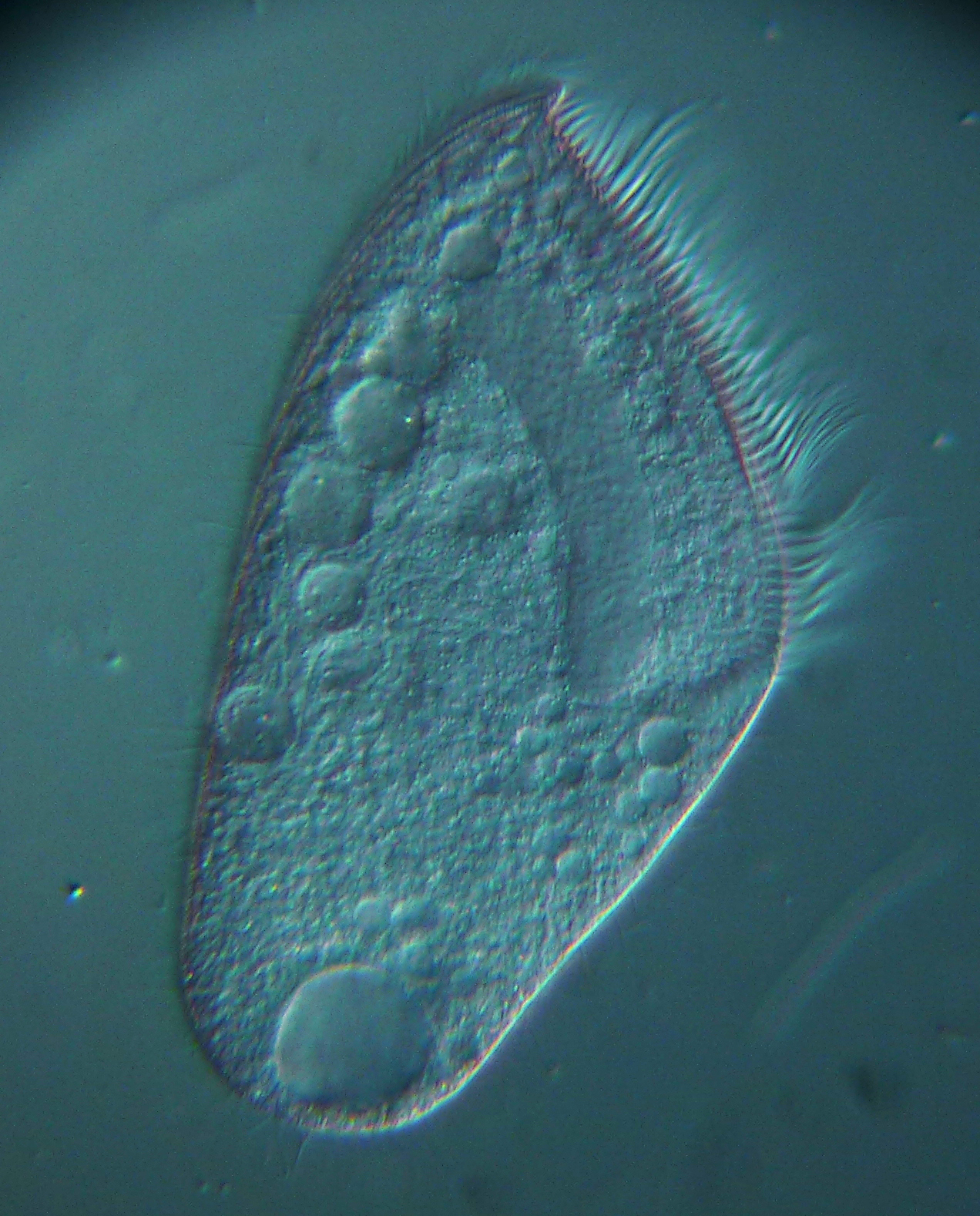
- Blepharisma hyalinum

Scientific classification
- Domain: Eukaryota
- Supergroup: Alveolata
- Phylum: Ciliophora
- Class: Heterotrichea
- Order: Heterotrichida
- Family: Blepharismidae; Jankowski in Small & Lynn, 1985

Species
- Anigsteinia Isquith, 1968; Blepharisma Perty, 1849; Pseudoblepharisma Kahl, 1927

= Blepharismidae =

Family of protists

Blepharismidae is a family of unicellular ciliate protists found in fresh and salt water. Two genera are recognized: Blepharisma, which contains some model organisms, and Pseudoblepharisma (monotypic in most sources)

Parablepharisma was part of the family, but more careful inspection (morphological and molecular) has placed it in a separate class distinct from the heterotrichs. Acquisition of ribosomal sequences from Pseudoblepharisma in 2021 and 2022 also produces phylogenetic results incongruent with current taxonomy, instead placing the genus sister to Spirostomum.
