= Eduard Reichenow =

German zoologist (1883–1960)

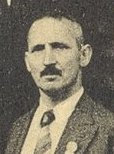
- E. Reichenow at the International Congress of Entomology in Madrid, 1935
- Born: 7 July 1883; Berlin
- Died: 23 March 1960 (aged 76); Wuppertal, Germany
- Education: Heidelberg, Berlin, Munich,
- Known for: Life cycle of the mosquito responsible for malaria (with Lilly Mudrow)
- Scientific career
- Fields: Protozoology
- Institutions: Imperial Health Ministry, Berlin; Kamerun (government zoologist), Museo Nacional de Ciencias Naturales, Madrid; Schiffs- und Tropenkrankheiten, Hamburg; University of Hamburg

Johann Eduard Reichenow (7 July 1883 – 23 March 1960) was a German protozoologist. He was the son of ornithologist Anton Reichenow.

== Biography ==
Reichenow was born in Berlin. He studied natural sciences in Heidelberg, Berlin and Munich, and received his doctorate in 1908. After graduation he conducted research on protozoans at the Imperial Health Ministry in Berlin. From 1913 onward, he served as a government zoologist in Kamerun, where he did studies on the biology of the malaria pathogen. From 1916 to 1919 he conducted research at the Museo Nacional de Ciencias Naturales in Madrid, and in 1921 was appointed director of the protozoology department at the Schiffs- und Tropenkrankheiten in Hamburg. During the same year, he received his habilitation from the University of Hamburg and in 1925 obtained the title of professor.

He was an editor of the journals: Zeitschrift für Tropenmedizin, the Zentralblatt für Bakteriologie and the Zeitschrift für Parasitenkunde. The Eduard-Reichenow-Medaille is an award offered by the Deutsche Gesellschaft für Protozoologie.

In 1932 Alfred Kahl named the protozoan genus Reichenowella (family Reichenowellidae) in his honor. His name is also associated with a species of Plasmodium, Plasmodium reichenowi, a malaria parasite of chimpanzees and gorillas, which Reichenow was the first to document. He died in Wuppertal.

In 1943 Reichenow and Lilly Mudrow helped solve a long-standing mystery in malaria infections; What is the parasite doing after mosquito bite and before blood-stage infection? Together the two researchers discovered parasite growth in endothelial cells in canaries infected the parasite in the avian malaria species Plasmodium praecox (now classified as P. relictum).

== Personal life ==
Reichenow married his former student and long-term collaborator Lilly Mudrow on 11 February 1946. Together they had a daughter, born March 1948. Mudrow died suddenly on 5 March 1957, after eleven years of marriage.

== Written works ==
In 1927–29 he published the fifth edition of Franz Theodor Doflein's Lehrbuch der Protozoenkunde; eine Darstellung der Naturgeschichte der Protozoen. The following are a few of his other noteworthy published works:

- Coccidien-Untersuchungen - Parts 1-3, 1913 (with C. Schellack) – Coccidia investigations.
- Die Tätigkeit deutscher Arzte in Afrika, 1935 – German medical activity in Africa.
- Ostafrikanische Beobachtungen an Trypanosomiden, 1940 – East African observations of Trypanosoma.
- Morphologie und Entwicklungsgeschichte der Protozoen, 1941 – Morphology and developmental history of protozoans.
- Grundriß der Protozoologie für Ärzte und Tierärzte, 1946 – Outline of protozoology for physicians and veterinarians.
