= Zoochlorella =

Scientific classification (obsolete)
- Kingdom: Plantae
- Division: Chlorophyta
- Class: Trebouxiophyceae
- Order: Chlorellales
- Family: Chlorellaceae
- Genus: Zoochlorella; K.Brandt, 1881, nom. rejic.

Genus of algae

Zoochlorella (pl.: zoochlorellae) is a colloquial term for any green algae that lives symbiotically within the body of an aquatic invertebrate animal or a protozoan.

== Classification ==
Zoochlorellae are various genera belonging to the classes Chlorophyceae and Trebouxiophyceae, historically treated as a single genus Zoochlorella due to their similar appearance to the genus Chlorella. However, this genus was found to be polyphyletic through molecular phylogeny, and currently considered nomen rejiciendum. As a consequence, the two species belonging to this obsolete genus have been transferred to different green algal genera.

- Zoochlorella conductrix K. Brandt → Micractinium Fresen.
- Zoochlorella parasitica K. Brandt → Choricystis (Skuja) Fott.

== Origin ==
The analogy between zoochlorellae and chloroplasts was used by the botanist Konstantin Mereschkowski in 1905 to argue about the symbiotic origin of chloroplasts (then called 'chromatophores', a term used for completely different structures today).

== Occurrence ==
=== In animals ===
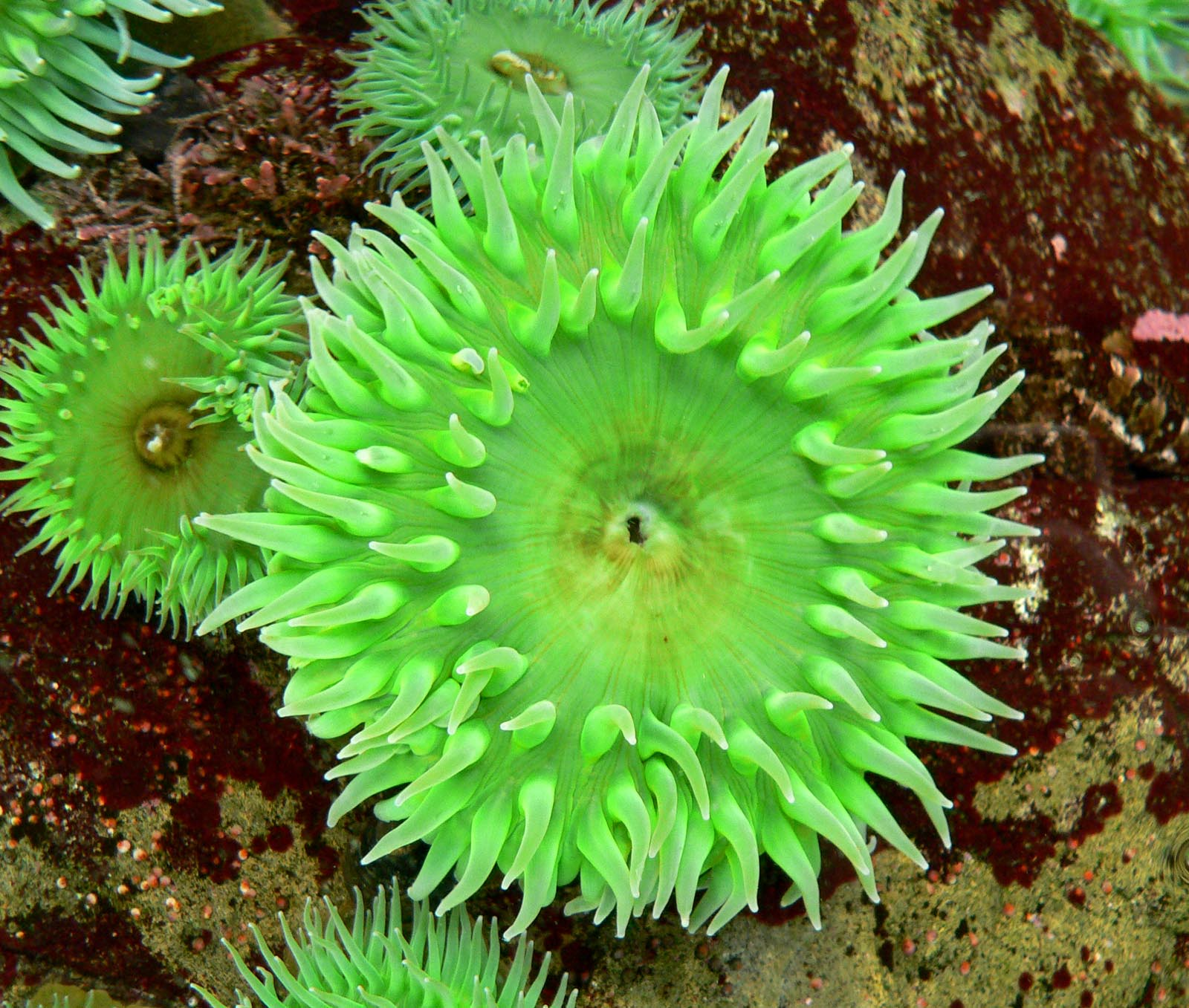
Anthopleura xanthogrammica gains its green colour from Zoochlorella

Zoochlorellae are responsible for the greenish colour of sea anemone tentacles. Zoochlorellae and zooxanthellae may both be found in the Pacific coast sea anemones Anthopleura elegantissima and Anthopleura xanthogrammica.

=== In protists ===
Four species of distantly related testate amoebae have independently evolved into obligate mixotrophy through the acquisition of zoochlorellae: Hyalosphenia papilio and Heleopera sphagni, two lobose amoebae belonging to the order Arcellinida within the phylum Amoebozoa; Archerella flavum, a member of the Labyrinthulomycetes in Stramenopiles; and Placocista spinosa, a filose amoeba belonging to the order Euglyphida within the phylum Cercozoa.

Various ciliates present zoochlorellae, such as the genera Paramecium, Stentor, Climacostomum, Coleps and Euplotes.

In the centrohelid Acanthocystis turfacea lives a unique zoochlorella species known as Chlorella heliozoae.

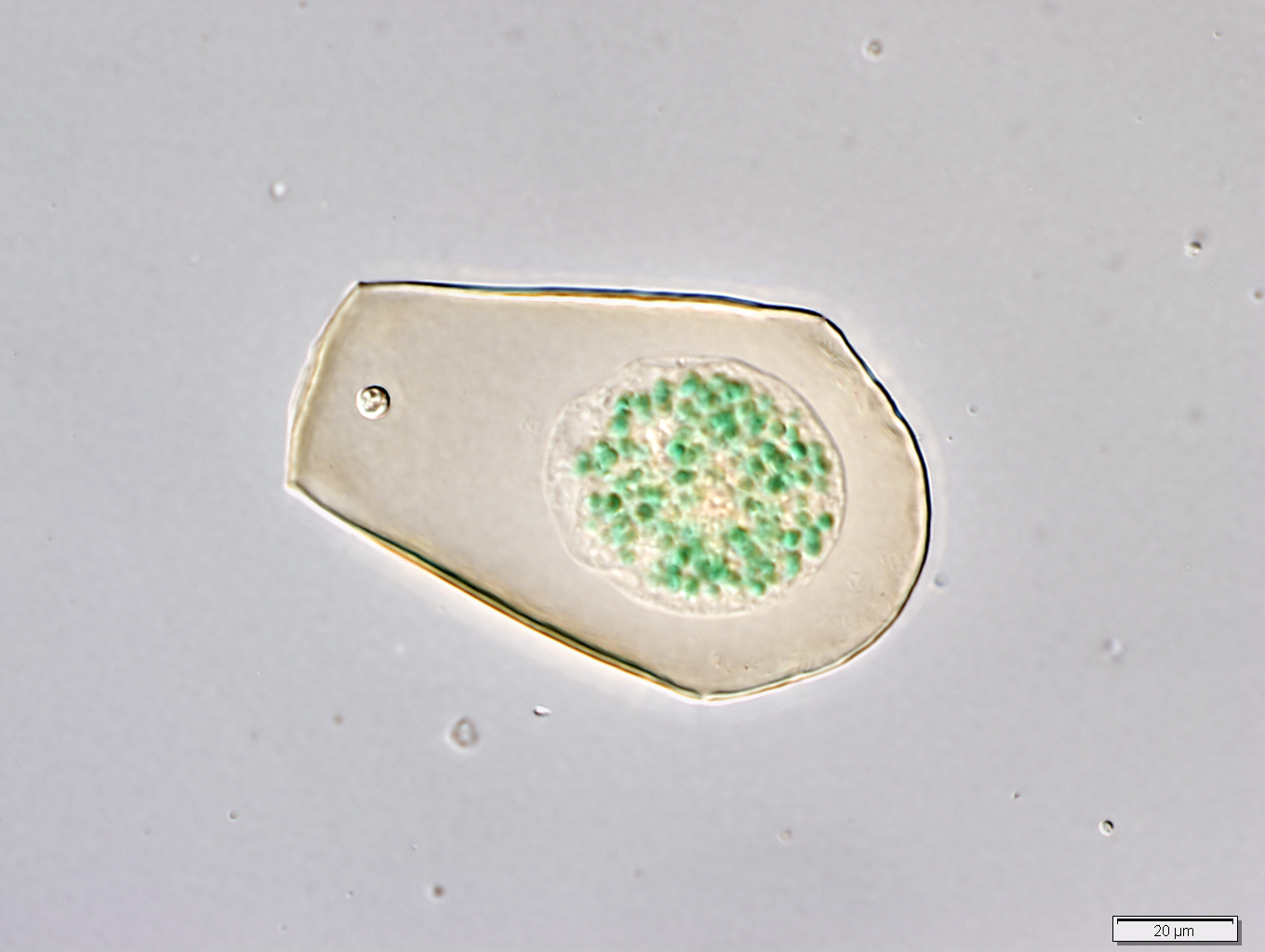
The amoeba Hyalosphenia papilio

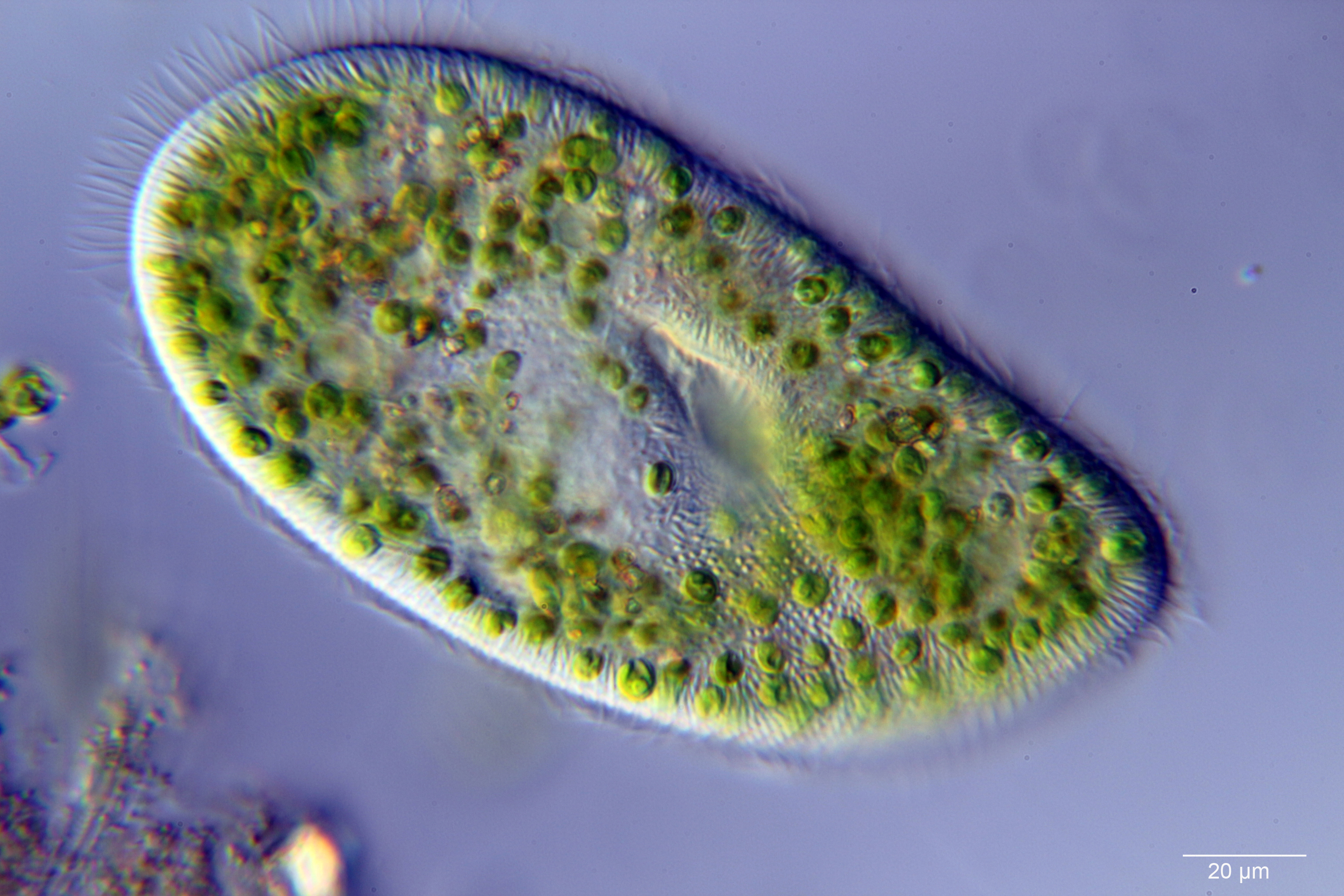
The ciliate Paramecium bursaria

Examples of protists containing zoochlorellae
