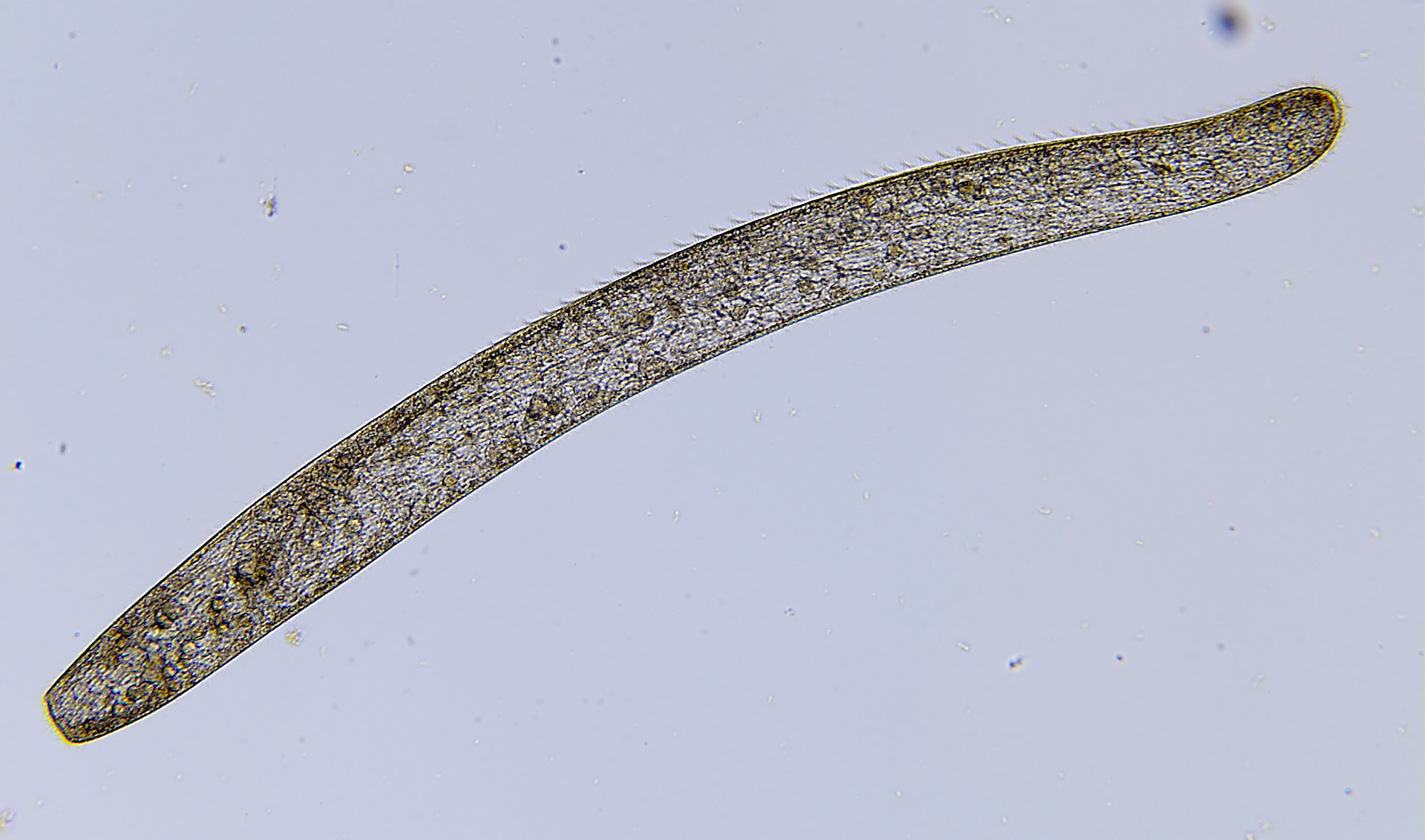
- Spirostomum ambiguum

Scientific classification
- Domain: Eukaryota
- Clade: Sar
- Clade: Alveolata
- Phylum: Ciliophora
- Class: Heterotrichea
- Family: Spirostomidae
- Genus: Spirostomum; Ehrenberg, 1833

Species
- Spirostomum ambiguum; Spirostomum caudatum; Spirostomum subtilis; Spirostomum dharwarensis; Spirostomum minus (= S. intermedium); Spirostomum semivirescens; Spirostomum teres; Spirostomum yagiui; Dubious but validly published: Spirostomum inflatum

= Spirostomum =

Genus of ciliated protists

Spirostomum is a genus of ciliated protists in the class Heterotrichea. It is known for being very contractile. Having been first identified by Christian Gottfried Ehrenberg in 1834, further research has identified eight additional true morphospecies. This bacterivore genus mainly lives in the sediment deposits at the bottom of various aquatic habitats, and members possess rquA genes that could be responsible for their ability to survive in these hypoxic and anoxic environments. They are identifiable by their relatively (to other ciliates) large tubular/flat vermiform bodies. Their life cycle consists of a growth stage, in which they mature, and asexual and sexual reproduction stages. Some species are model organisms for studies on human pathogenic bacteria, while others are sensitive and accurate bioindicators for toxic substances.

== Etymology ==
The etymology, origin and meaning of the genus name, has not been discussed in literature thus far. Although the meaning can be inferred, a translation is not provided here so the possibility of incorrect interpretations is minimal. However, it is known that the genus name Spirostomum refers to the spiral contraction ability that these ciliates possess. The presence of post-ciliary fibers at the anterior end of the organism allows for this type of contraction, resulting in a counterclockwise spiral movement.

== History of knowledge ==
The genus Spirostomum was first mentioned by German researcher Christian Gottfried Ehrenberg in 1834 and then referred to later in his 1838 publication Die Infusionsthierchen als vollkommene Organismen, a collection of more than 350 species. At that time, the genus did not have a definition or description. In 1841, in his book Histoire naturelle des Zoophytes—Infusoires, Félix Dujardin, provided a description of the genus, but only recognized Spirostomum ambiguum as a species.

Around this time, another researcher, Friedrich Stein, played a key role in the classification of ciliated protists. He proposed dividing the phylum into four orders: Holotricha, Hypotricha, Petritricha, and Heterotricha (the order to which Spirostomum belongs). In Stein’s summary monograph of the order Heterotricha, Der Organismus der Infusionsthiere (1867), he provided a detailed account and illustration for Spirostomum, as well as a description of the nomenclature. He recognized two species: S. ambiguum (Ehrenberg) and S. teres, identified by Edouard Claparède and Johannes Lachmann in their 1858 publication Étude sur les Infusoires et les Rhizopodes.

Maximilian Perty’s classification of the species S. semivirescens in his 1852 publication Zur Kenntniss kleinster Lebensformen, was dismissed by Stein, who claimed that it was simply a variation of the species Spirostomum ambiguum.

In agreement with Stein, Eugène Penard also recognized S. ambiguum and S. teres as species of the genus, with the addition of S. filum, described in his book Études sur les Infusoires d’eau douce (1922). This species had previously been described as Uroleptus filum by Ehrenberg but was considered as a member of the genus Spirostomum by researchers Claparède and Lachmann, as well as Otto Bütschli in his 1889 publication Protozoa. Part III. Infusoria. This had been a speculative placement as these researchers had relied on Ehrenberg’s illustrated figures to draw their conclusion. Penard, having had the opportunity to observe the live organism like Ehrenberg, felt justified in his classification of the S. filum being a species in the genus.

In 1974, in their article “The systematics of the genus Spirostomum Ehrenberg, 1838”, Repak and Isquith recognized nine Spirostomum species, but S. inflatum and S. loxodes were removed due to their ambiguous cell shape. They were never mentioned again in other articles. S. intermedium was synonymized with S. minus by Foissner et al. in 1992, and Vittorio Boscaro et al. argued in their 2014 article that S. ephrussi should also be synonymized with S. teres. There are currently eight accepted morphospecies in the genus: S. ambiguum, S. minus, S. teres, S. yagiui, S. dharwarensis, S. semivirescens, S. subtilis, S. caudatum.

== Habitat and ecology ==
Organisms from the genus Spirostomum are commonly found worldwide in diverse aquatic habitats such as fresh or brackish (low salinity) water environments in the nutrient-rich sediment deposits located at the bottom of the water bodies. Due to debris accumulation, biofilm, and low oxygen transport, these deposits result in microaerophilic or anaerobic conditions so the genus experiences hypoxia and even anoxia daily. However, due to evidence of the presence of the rhodoquinol dependent fumarate reduction pathway, an anaerobic pathway, these organisms have the capability of respiring under oxygen-depleted and anoxic conditions.

They are considered large ciliate bacterivores and are also capable of feeding on microflagellates; they are among the top consumers of prokaryotic microbes in biofilms. In a study conducted by Matthew Spencer and Philip H. Warren (1996), Spirostomum ambiguum was found to be more plentiful in high-energy systems in comparison to low-energy systems. Due to their relatively large size, it was found that they do not deal with predation by other species present in the culture in the lab setup. However, this genus is prey for bigger and more complex organisms sharing their habitat. They are placed near the top of the functional food chain amongst predatory protozoa and microcrustacea.

== Description ==
=== Morphology and anatomy ===
Spirostomum is a medium to large worm-like (vermiform) elongated ciliate, ranging from around 150 μm to 4 mm and is large enough to be confused with small helminths. It moves by gliding slowly over or swimming freely above the substrate. It possesses tubular or somewhat flattened bodies, with colours ranging from a faint brown or yellow, to green. The organism is bound externally by a thin layer of ectoplasm while the endoplasm consists of large vacuoles separated by a mesh of fluid protoplasm. Cells are often hosts of prokaryotic and eukaryotic symbionts.

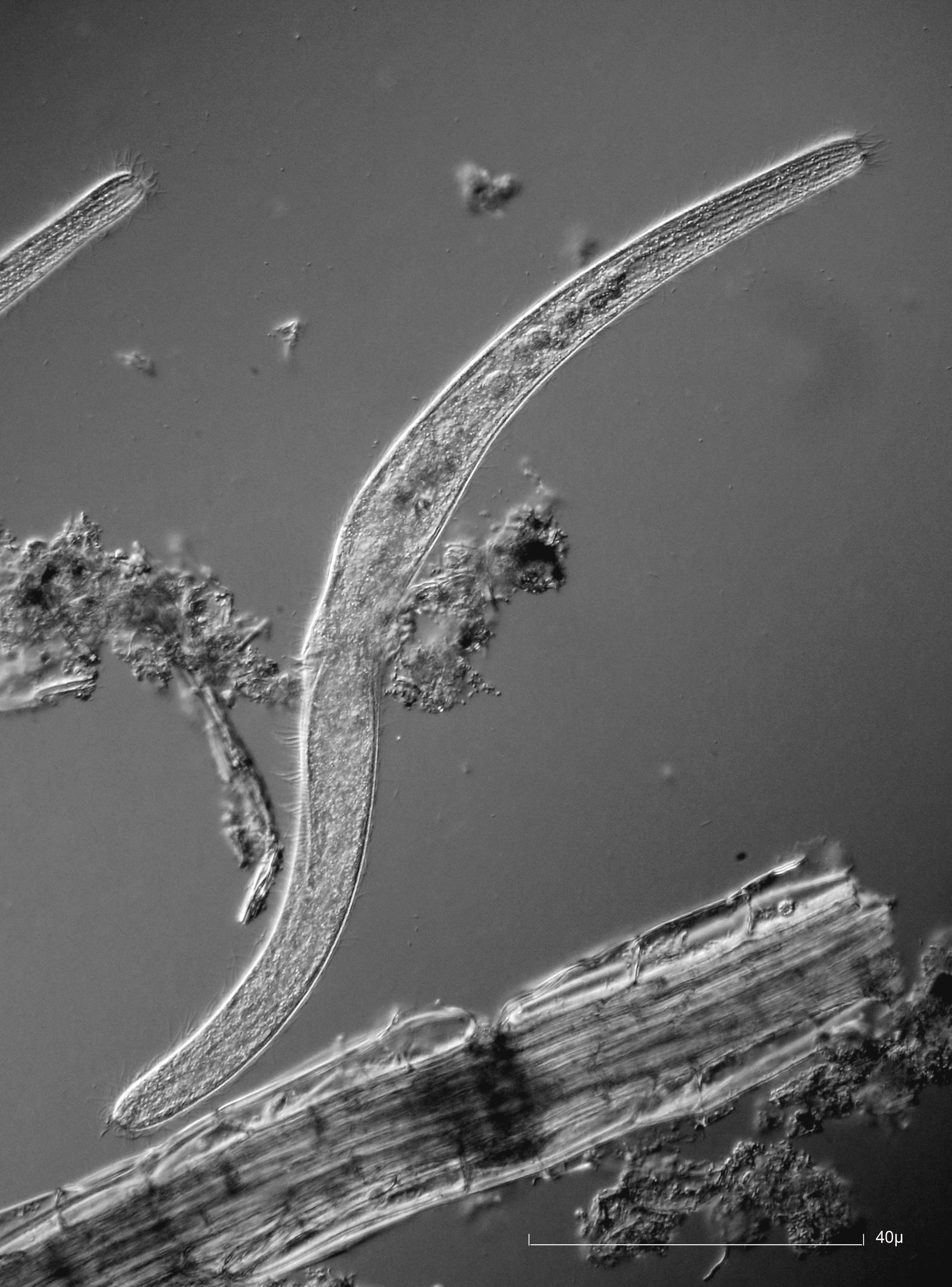
Spirostomum sp.

The oral region is surprisingly long, and is bounded by a long adoral zone of membranelles on the left side. A paroral kinety is located to the right of the AZM, thickened significantly at its proximal end. The genus also has 10-50 somatic kineties (depending on the species), distributed on the cell surface, that are positioned parallel to the main body axis. However, upon contraction, these kineties form clockwise spirals, and the cell takes on an ellipsoid shape. There are also 1-6 rows of packed cortical granules in between each pair of kineties.

When the organism is left undisturbed on a slide, it builds a protective layer of mucilaginous lorica that accumulates sediment particles from the debris located around the specimen as it moves. During filter feeding, the anterior end of the organism would protrude out of the completed lorica.

A single contractile vacuole is positioned at the posterior end of the organism, attached to a collecting canal that extends towards the anterior end. When filled with fluid, the vacuole takes up a substantial portion of the posterior end. The distinction between the contractile vacuole and the rest of the cytoplasm is usually very clear.

Species can possess either a moniliform or single (in ellipsoid, filiform, or elongated form) macronucleus. This is not dependent on the life stages, but rather that some species have a certain type while others have the other. They also have a variable number of macronuclei that are around 1-3 μm in size. Spirostomum’s macronucleus, possessing a double membrane with perforations, is the first record of a nucleus being highly extensile. The macronucleus can initially measure at 18 μm and then be extended to 72 μm (fifteen times longer). The number of micronuclei vary, but they are either ovoid or ellipsoid in shape and are usually located near the macronuclei. For “single” type macronuclei, there are depressions for the micronuclei, thus resulting in overlapping.

Characteristics of the eight morphospecies are outlined in Table 1, which provides a brief overview of specific characteristics. Two species, S. caudatum and S. semivirescens, have missing information in the table due to the limited amount of research completed. Spirostomum caudatum is characterized mainly by its long thin tail, while Spirostomum semivirescens is identified by the presence of zoochlorellae (endosymbiotic algae) in its cytoplasm, providing its bright green colour. Esteban et al. suggested that it is possible that S. semivirescens was able to survive in hypoxic environments due to the oxygenic photosynthesis performed by the endosymbiotic algae. Spirostomum yagiui has an elongated macronuclei that circle through three unique states. This differentiates it from Spirostomum dharwarensis that has a distinctive filiform macronucleus that is long and slender relative to the other single-type macronuclei. Spirostomum subtilis have the highest length:width ratios, which sets it apart from its counterparts. It also has a unique cortical granule pattern that consists of a single CG row.

Table 1: A summary of characteristics of the eight true morphospecies of Spirostomum adapted from the information provided in Boscaro et al. (2014).
	S. ambiguum	S. minus	S. teres	S. subtilis	S. yagiui	S. dharwarensis	S. caudatum	S. semivirescens
Total length (μm)	900–4000	350–900	150–650	700–1000	240–500	300–550	200–700	600–2000
Length of peristome relative to body	1/2–2/3	1/2	1/3–1/2	1/2	1/3–1/2	1/2–2/3	1/4	1/2
Length of contractile vacuole relative to body	1/10	less than 1/5	less than 1/5	1/3	less than 1/5	less than 1/5		
Length:width ratio	9–17	7–15	5–16	14–24	6–17	8–14		17–40
Color	slightly creamlike	yellowish	brownish	colourless	brownish	dark		green
Macronuclear shape	moniliform	moniliform	ellipsoid	moniliform	elongated	filiform	ellipsoid	moniliform
Number of macronuclear nodes	12-50	5-25	1	15-24	1	1	1	12
Length of macronuclei (μm)	35–45	30–40	20–50 × 5–20	20–25	35–90 × 5–15	100–200 × 5–10		
Number of micronuclei	12–100	3–20	1–3	1–6	up to 6	1–7		
Length of micronuclei (μm)	1–2	1.5–3.5	1–2	2–3	2	1–3		
Number of kineties on each side	15–25	6–12	5–15	9–12	6–12	7–13	14–16	14–15
Number of CG rows per stripe	4–5	2–4	2–4	1	2–4	3–4		
Natural habitat (water)	fresh	fresh	fresh and brackish	fresh	brackish	fresh	fresh	fresh

Information regarding S. caudatum and S. semivirescens is minimal as there is a lack of knowledge and research on these two species. Please note that these findings are based on the specimens observed by the researchers mentioned and thus, when observing the description of organisms in other primary literature, there may be slight differences between the numbers mentioned in this table and the numbers observed in other articles. Both should be considered true as these ranges can be adjusted to include smaller or larger organisms in the various species.

=== Life cycle ===
Ciliates generally have two forms of reproduction. They are able to reproduce asexually through division via fission and sexually through conjugation. During fission, it is observed that the micronucleus divides mitotically before the cell separates into daughter cells. Micronuclei divide amitotically. On the other hand, during conjugation, the macronucleus is reabsorbed, and the micronuclei perform meiosis. For the genus Spirostomum, most of these characteristics are observed.

The following descriptions of the reproduction processes are based on observations made of Spirostomum ambiguum, the most investigated species in the genus.

Asexual division begins with the formation of the peristomal membranelle, AZM, of the new cytostome, indicated by the slight ridge in the posterior end of the specimen which eventually becomes more pronounced. Then, the macronucleus straightens out and loses its lobation, becoming vermiform (like a worm). The macronucleus contracts and thickens, resulting in contracted macronucleus positioned in the anterior end of the organism, before rapidly moving to the middle. The contractile vacuole begins splitting to form the daughter contractile vacuole. The macronucleus begins to elongate, with less of it being in the anterior end, and the cell begins separating slightly below the location of the anterior cytostome. The macronucleus divides before the cell divides, forming two daughter cells.

Conjugation, the sexual stage, begins with the attachment of the cells together. The conjugates are attached either at or close to the anterior end of both cells. Conjugants are almost always similar in size. Both conjugants are attached from the apex, along the oral groove, to the cytostome by a thin sheet of ectoplasm. Because they are attached like this, it is impossible to feed during conjugation. It is noted that ingestion stops prior to conjugation as indicated by the rare amounts of ingested food found in the cytoplasm during the process.

The micronuclei begin to swell, slowly moving away from the macronucleus. Then the moniliform macronucleus beings breaking up into isolated segments, at the points where the nodes were previously connected. Most of the segments move towards the anterior end of the cell, as do most of the enlarged micronuclei which position themselves between the macronuclei nodes. Then the micronuclei undergo meiosis first producing four daughter nuclei. Three of the daughter nuclei disappear while the fourth one undergoes mitosis and produces two haploid gametic nuclei. Reciprocal exchange occurs, the gametic nuclei fuse together, and then the conjugants separate. The duration from attachment to separation takes around 60–72 hours. The fused nuclei, called the synkaryon, divides twice into four daughter nuclei. Two of these nuclei fuse and elongate, then form a moniliform macronucleus. The other two nuclei become micronuclei. Some variations may occur in this process, such as the formation of six daughter nuclei to account for the different numbers of micronuclei in each specimen.

Other than its reproduction and growth phases, Spirostomum does not possess any other distinct stages in its life cycle.

=== Genetics ===
The ability to adapt in hypoxic (low oxygen) or anoxic (no oxygen) habitats in an important aspect in protozoan ecology. Spirostomum has demonstrated their capability of living in these environments and the reason may be linked some genes they possess. Mukhtar et al. (2021) suggested that the rhodoquinol dependent pathway that had been previously reported in multiple heterotrichs could be responsible for the ability to survive in these conditions. By performing RNA sequencing and analyzing the data for the presence of rquA, a gene responsible for the synthesis of rhodoquinone (RQ), the presence of this pathway in Spirostomum could be investigated. This gene was used since its product, rhodoquinone, is an important cofactor in the fumarate reductase pathway. The species S. ambiguum, S. teres, and S. subtilis were collected from a freshwater pond for this study. Based on the analysis of the transcriptome, two or three RquA proteins were found in the species, providing evidence of the existence of the rhodoquinol dependent fumarate reduction pathway in these organisms. In another study, two Spirostomum species, S. semivirescens and an unidentified one, were also found to have the gene. The presence of the gene in the four species suggests that this anaerobic respiration pathway is present in the entire genus.

== Practical importance ==
Spirostomum species are used as model organisms for human pathogenic bacteria research and some species have been used to determine water quality as they demonstrate sensitivity to toxic substances such as heavy metal.

For instance, due to being large, unicellular organisms that can be seen without a microscope, observing test responses of assays can be performed quickly. Nalecz-Jawecki et al. (1993) determined that a duration of one hour was sufficient for results when estimating the toxicity of water polluted by heavy metals such as silver, copper, and mercury. Additionally, the test could be performed using a wide range of water pH (6.0-85) and hardness (2.8–250 mg). It was also observed that the cultures could be formed in non-sterile conditions, making it efficient and less time-consuming. The test responses observed are cell deformations and lethality, with deformations providing fast and sensitive results.

Several authors have observed the acute toxicity of heavy metals to multiple freshwater ciliates and it was found that Spirostomum teres was one of two ciliate species that demonstrated the highest sensitivity to nickel. Further comparison of other heavy metal results indicated that S. teres, due to their ability to survive in hypoxic settings and to travel along the water column, was an excellent and convenient bioindicator for heavy metals such as copper, mercury, and zinc. In another study, the species was shown to have sensitivity to mercury, copper, cadmium, thiram, and Na-PCP. Tushmalova et al. formed a cost-effective bioassay that was also sensitive, simple, and easily performed using S. teres to provide a reasonable and affordable method of risk assessment. As such, it is shown through multiple studies that Spirostomum’s ability to react to low concentrations of such physical and chemical stressors and factors make them suitable candidates for water quality indicators.

== Photo gallery ==
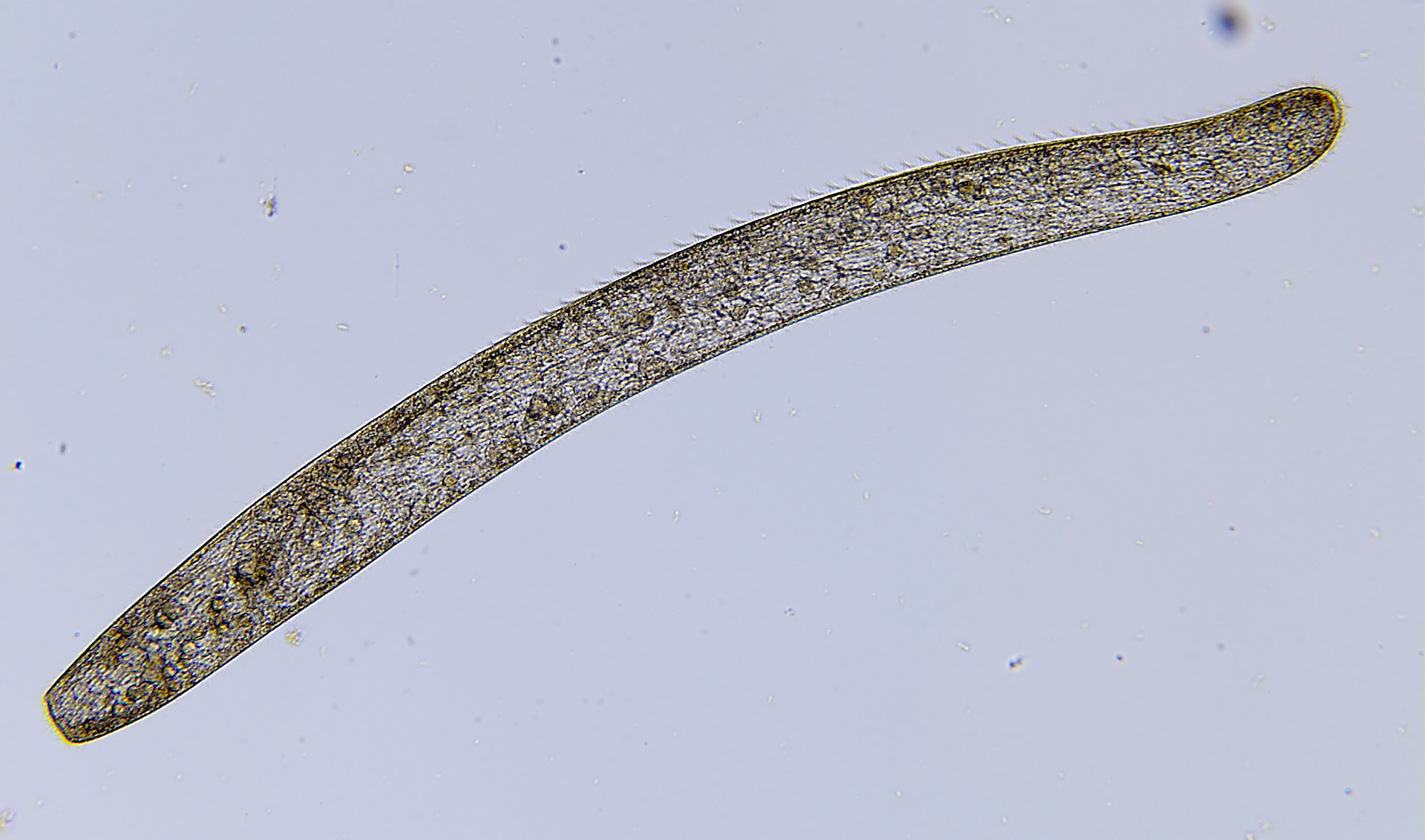
Spirostomum ambiguum

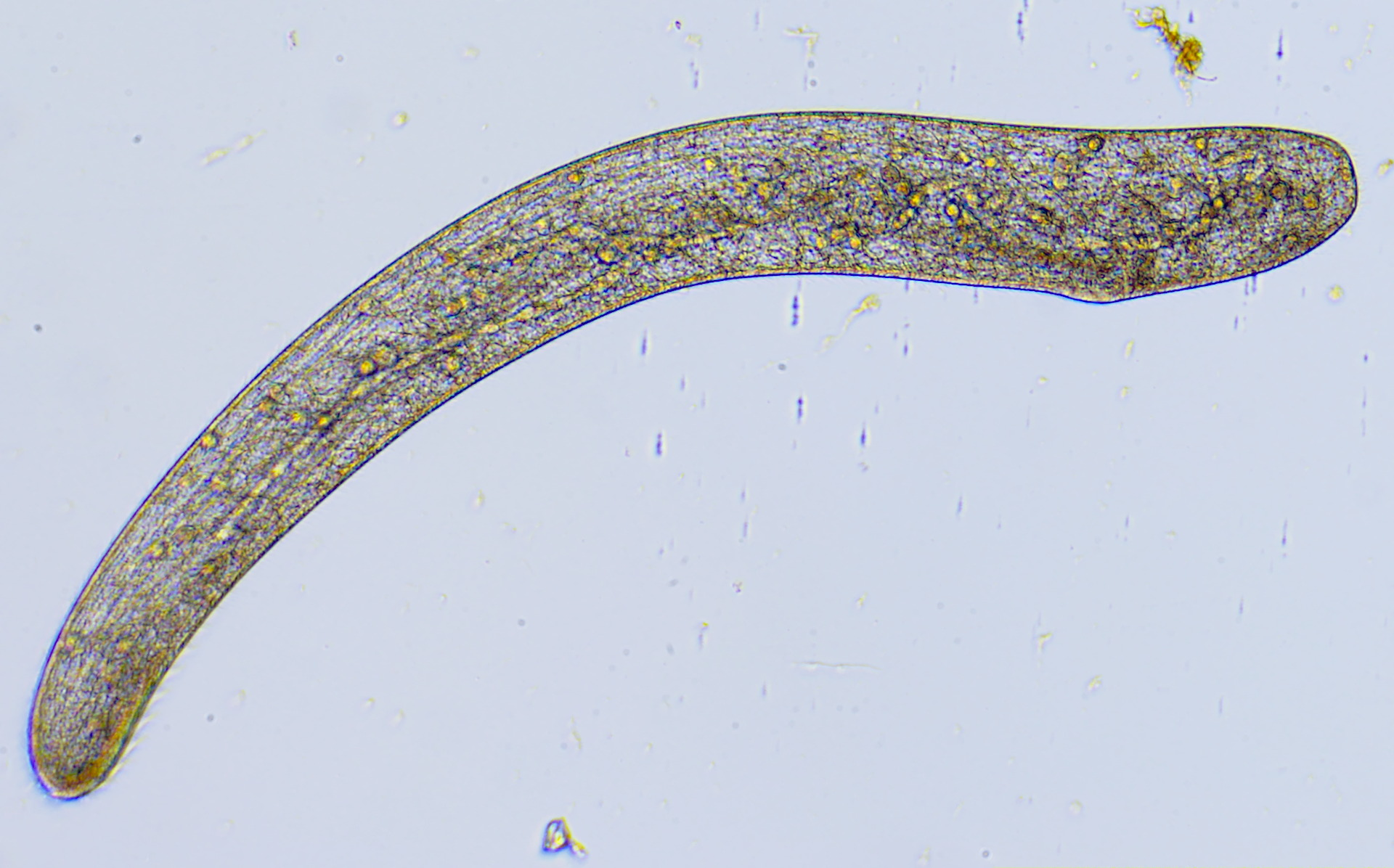
Spirostomum macronucleus

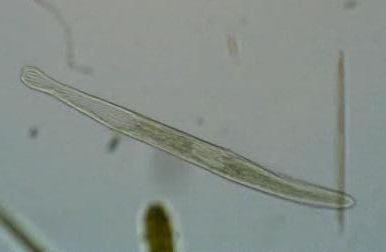
Spirostomum teres still

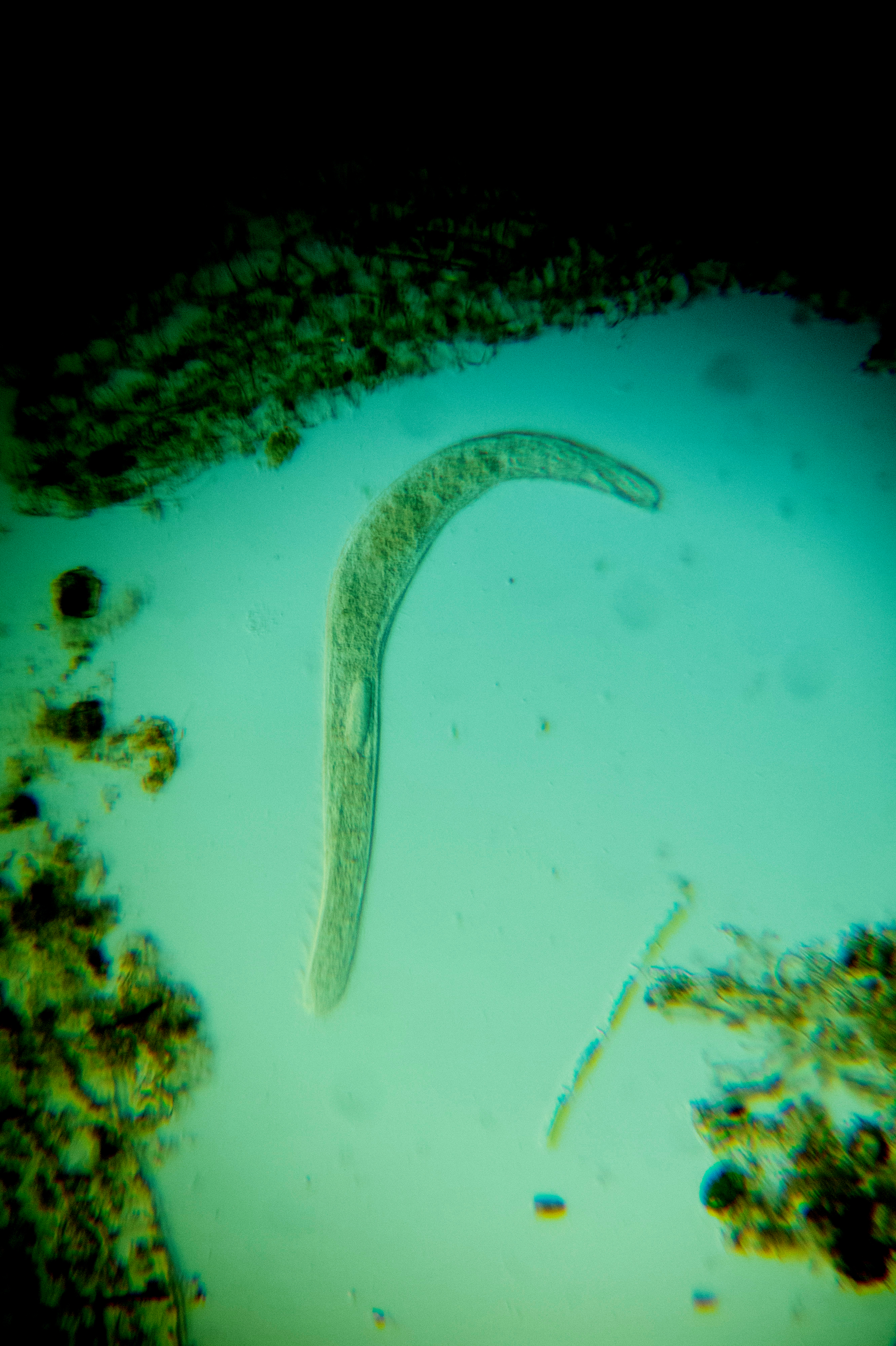
Spirostomum teres – 160x

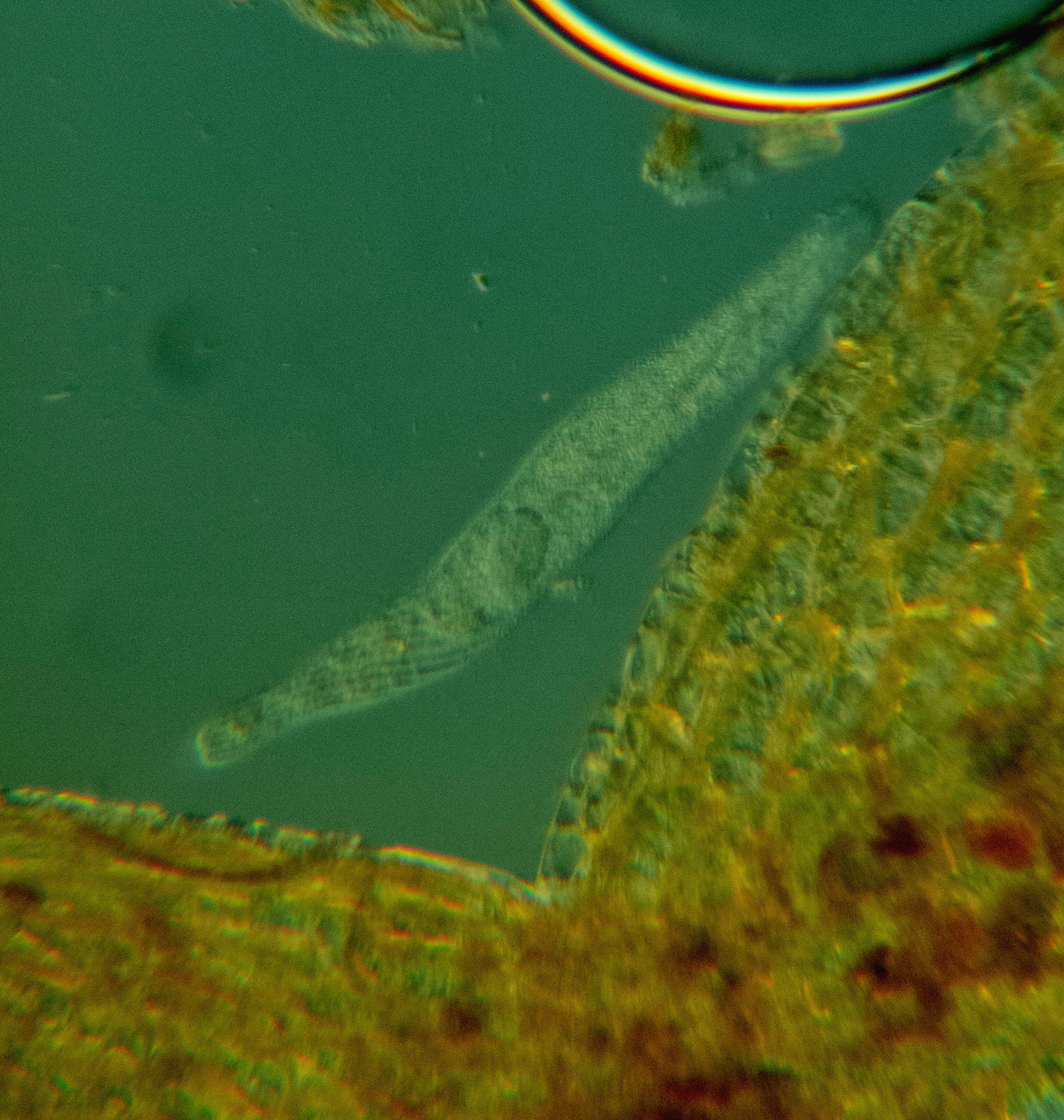
Spirostomum teres – 160x

== Video gallery ==
Spirostomum minus

Spirostomum cell division (binary fission)

Spirostomum caudatum (contraction)

Spirostomum teres

== See also ==
- Largest organisms
