= Franz Theodor Doflein =

German zoologist

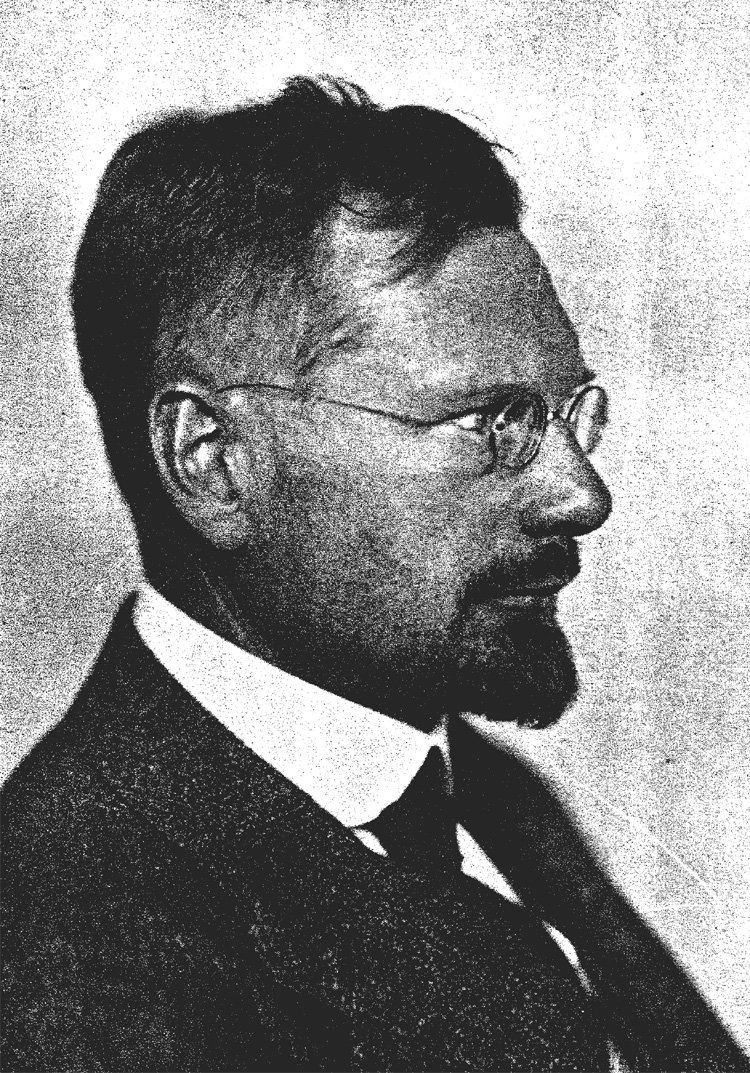

Franz Theodor Doflein (5 April 1873, in Paris – 24 August 1924, in Obernigk, near today's Wrocław) was a German zoologist known for his studies of animal ecology. He worked on a range of organisms including crabs, ants and wrote a textbook on protozoa that went into several editions.

== Biography ==
Doflein was born in Paris to a German merchant married to an Englishwoman. After the death of his father in 1900, he moved to Germany and studied medicine and zoology at the Ludwig-Maximilians-Universität München, where he was influenced by Richard Hertwig. From 1895 to 1896, he worked as an auxiliary assistant to Alexander Götte at the University of Strasbourg, followed by research of fish diseases at the Ludwig-Maximilians-Universität München as an assistant under Bruno Hofer. In 1898, on behalf of the Bavarian Academy of Sciences and Humanities, he took part in a study trip to the West Indies, Mexico and California. After his return to Germany, he served as an assistant at the Zoologischen Staatssammlung (Zoological State Collections) in Munich.

From 1904 to 1905, he conducted zoological research in Japan and Ceylon. In 1907, he became an associate professor of zoological systematics and biology at the Ludwig-Maximilians-Universität München, and three years later, was named second director of the Zoologischen Staatssammlung. In 1912, he succeeded August Weismann as chair of zoology at the University of Freiburg, and following a research trip to Macedonia, he obtained a professorship at the University of Breslau in 1918.

His name is associated with Doflein's salamander, Bolitoglossa dofleini, circumscribed by Franz Werner in 1903. The sea anemone genus Dofleinia also bears his name, as do taxa with the specific epithet of dofleini, an example being Enteroctopus dofleini (Giant Pacific octopus).

Besides his scientific work, Doflein practiced painting and wrote novellas and a travelogue.

== Published works ==
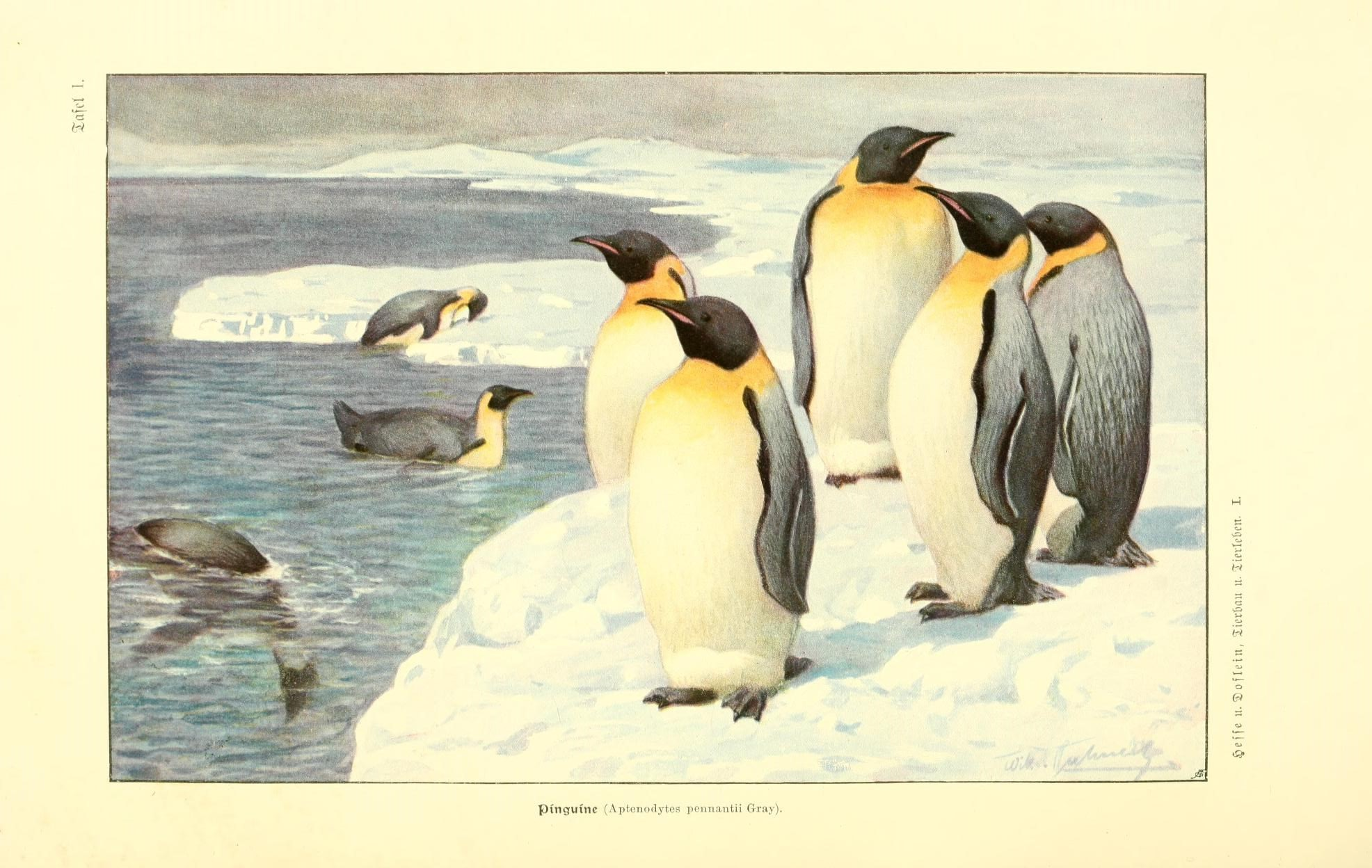
Illustration of penguins from: Tierbau und Tierleben in ihrem Zusammenhang betrachtet.

He was the author of a well-received textbook on protozoans, titled Lehrbuch der Protozoenkunde. It was published over several editions; its fifth edition (1927–29) being issued by Eduard Reichenow. He was also the author of significant works associated with termites, crustaceans, ants and ant lions.

- Die Protozoen als Parasiten und Krankheitserreger nach biologischen Gesichtspunkten dargestellt, 1901 – The protozoan as parasite and pathogen, etc.
- Die Pilzkulturen der Termiten, 1905 – The fungal cultures of termites
- Mitteilungen über japanische Crustaceen, 1906 – On Japanese crustaceans
- Tierbau und Tierleben in ihrem Zusammenhang betrachtet; 2 volumes, 1910, 1914 (with Richard Hesse)
- Lehrbuch der Protozoenkunde; eine Darstellung der Naturgeschichte der Protozoen, 1909 – Textbook of protozoan studies: a representation involving the natural history of the protozoa.
- Probleme der Protistenkunde, 1909 – Problems associated with protist studies.
- Lebensgewohnheiten und Anpassungen bei dekapoden Krebsen, 1910 – Behavior and adaptation of decapod crabs.
- Beiträge zur Naturgeschichte Ostasiens, 1911 (editor) – Contributions ro East Asian natural history.
- Der Ameisenlöwe: Eine biologische, tierpsychologische und reflexbiologische Untersuchung, 1916 – The ant lion, analysis of its biology, animal psychology and reflex biology.
- Mazedonische ameisen. Beobachtungen über ihre Lebensweise, 1920 – Macedonian ants; observations of its behavior.

== Taxa named in his honor ==
- Dofleini's lantern fish Lobianchia dofleini (Zugmayer, 1911), is a species of lanternfish found in the Atlantic Ocean.
- Doflein's salamander (Bolitoglossa dofleini) is a species of salamander in the family Plethodontidae. It is found in Belize, Guatemala, Nicaragua and Honduras. Its natural habitats are subtropical or tropical moist lowland forests, subtropical or tropical moist montane forests, plantations, and heavily degraded former forest.
- The giant Pacific octopus (Enteroctopus dofleini), also known as the North Pacific giant octopus, is a large marine cephalopod belonging to the genus Enteroctopus. Its spatial distribution includes the coastal North Pacific, along Mexico (Baja California), The United States (California, Oregon, Washington, and Alaska), Canada (British Columbia), Russia, Eastern China, Japan, and the Korean Peninsula.
