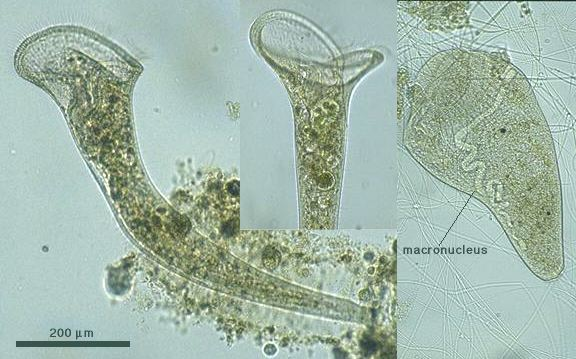
- Stentor roeselii

Scientific classification
- Domain: Eukaryota
- Supergroup: Alveolata
- Phylum: Ciliophora
- Subphylum: Postciliodesmatophora
- Class: Heterotrichea; Stein 1859
- Order: Heterotrichida; Stein 1859

Families
- Blepharismidae Jankowksi in Small & Lynn, 1985; Climacostomidae Repak, 1972; Condylostomatidae Kahl in Doflein & Reichenow, 1929; Folliculinidae Dons, 1914; Maristentoridae Miao, Simpson, Fu. & Lobban, 2005; Peritromidae Stein, 1867; Spirostomidae Stein, 1867; Stentoridae Carus, 1863

= Heterotrich =

Class of single-celled organisms

The heterotrichs are a class of ciliates. They typically have a prominent adoral zone of membranelles circling the mouth, used in locomotion and feeding, and shorter cilia on the rest of the body. Many species are highly contractile, and are typically compressed or conical in form. These include some of the largest protozoa, such as Stentor and Spirostomum, as well as many brightly pigmented forms, such as certain Blepharisma.

== Etymology ==
The term heterotrich derives from the ancient Greek ἕτερος (héteros), meaning "another, different", and θρίξ, τριχός (thríx, trikhós), meaning 'hair', because of the contrast between the regular somatic ciliation and that of the oral zone.

== Ultrastructure ==
A number of ultrastructural details characterize the group. The cilia on the body are in dikinetids, in which either the anterior one or both kinetosomes may be ciliated, and which are associated with fibers composed of overlapping postciliary microtubules, called postciliodesmata and found only in this group and the closely related Karyorelictea. A series of oral polykinetids, each containing two or three rows of kinetosomes, support the membranelles. These run from the left to the anterior of the mouth, and often spiral out of the oral cavity. The macronucleus is divided by external microtubules, whereas in the Karyorelictea it forms by differentiation of micronuclei, and in all other ciliates it is divided by internal microtubules.

== Pigmentation ==
Many species are highly pigmented, e.g. the blue Stentor coeruleus. In Blepharisma, the red pigment is associated with light sensitivity. Species of blue-pigmented Eufolliculina form extensive mats in the deep sea that have been called "blue mats".

== Systematics ==
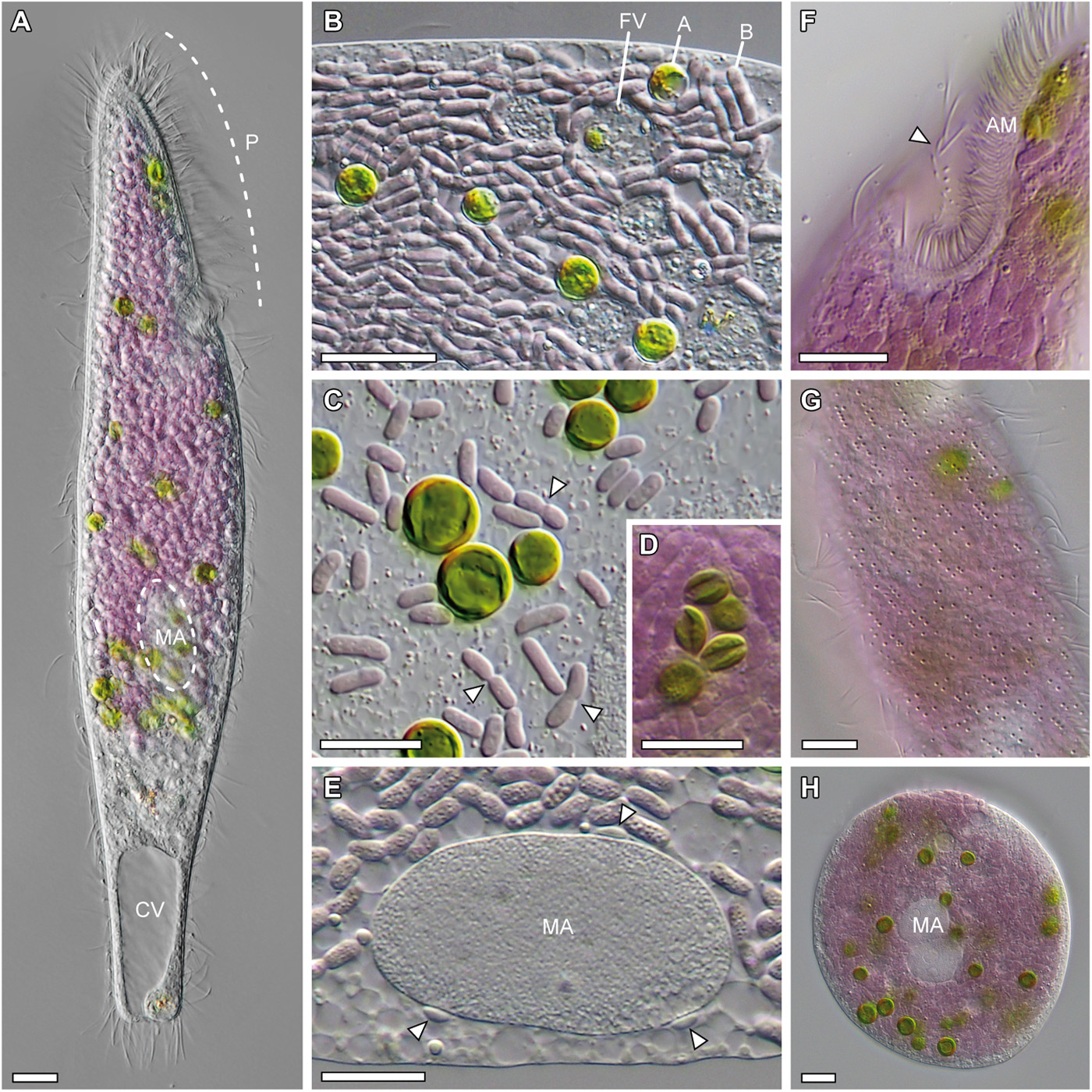
Morphology of Pseudoblepharisma tenue (Blepharismidae) and its two photosynthetic endosymbionts Chlorella sp. K10 and Ca. Thiodictyon intracellulare (Chromatiaceae)

Early classification schemes by Otto Bütschli, Alfred Kahl, Emmanuel Fauré-Fremiet, and John O. Corliss classified the heterotrichs as a subgroup of spirotrichs. They included groups such as Armophorida, Odontostomatida, Licnophorida, Clevelandellida, and Plagiotomida within the Heterotrichea. However, more recent classification systems, which have incorporated information from molecular phylogenetics, place the above groups within the Intramacronucleata, because they are not closely related to the "core" heterotrichs at all. Almost all of the "true" heterotrichs belong to a single order, Heterotrichida.

In the classification scheme of Lynn (2008), the order Heterotrichida contains the following nine families:

- Blepharismidae Jankowski in Small & Lynn, 1985
- Chattonidiidae Villeneuve-Brachon 1940
- Climacostomidae Repak, 1972
- Condylostomatidae Kahl in Doflein & Reichenow, 1929
- Folliculinidae Dons, 1914
- Maristentoridae Miao, Simpson, Fu & Lobban 2005
- Peritromidae Stein, 1867
- Spirostomidae Stein, 1867
- Stentoridae Carus, 1863

Two new families were established in 2014 on the basis of molecular phylogenies:

- Gruberiidae
- Fabreidae
