= Alfred Kahl =

German microbiologist

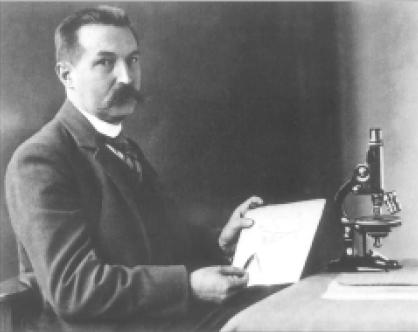
- Born: 18 February 1877; Warwerort, Germany
- Died: November 1946 (aged 69)
- Scientific career
- Fields: Naturalist

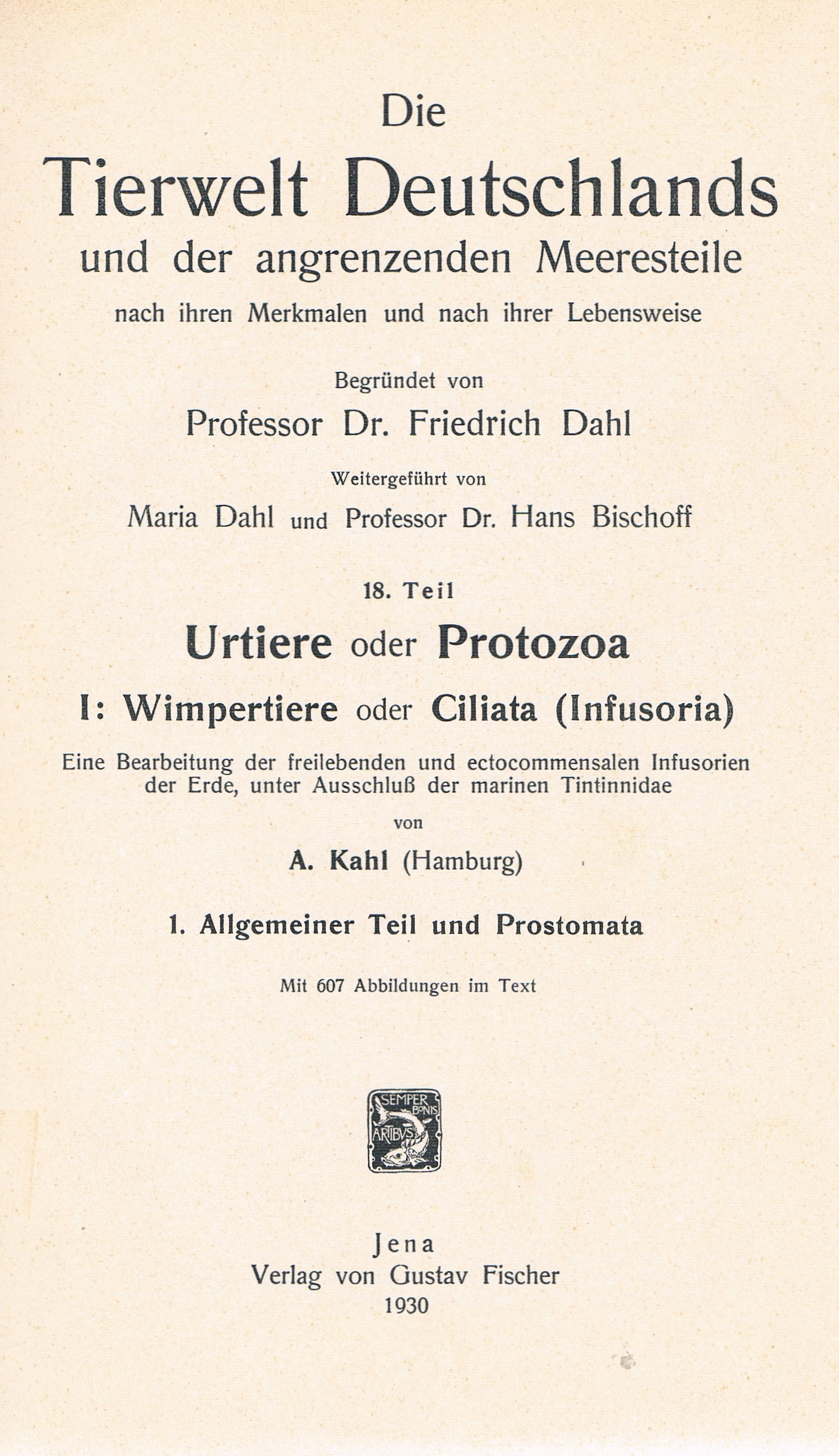
Title page of Alfred Kahl's 4-volume compendium on ciliates, Wimpertiere oder Ciliata, 1930-35

Alfred Detlef Fritz Kahl (18 February 1877 – November, 1946) was a German schoolteacher who took up microscopy in mid-life and became a leading authority on ciliated protozoa. In a burst of scientific productivity that lasted just nine years, he published 1800 pages of scholarly work, in which he described 17 new ciliate families, 57 genera, and about 700 previously unknown species. During his brief career as a protozoologist, he redescribed and illustrated nearly all the species of ciliates known in his time, and fit them into a taxonomic scheme that remains influential today.

== Life ==
Kahl was born in the municipality of Warwerort, in the Dithmarschen district of Germany, a region of the country that includes the city of Hamburg. Official records show that he taught primary school in Hamburg, from 1897 to 1901, and that by 1934 he was teaching English, French and Natural History at a Gymnasium (High School) in Hamburg. Nothing else is known about his early life. His interest in ciliates began, according to his own account, when his daughter was studying under Eduard Reichenow, then head of the protozoa department at the Hamburg Tropical Institute: "The very interesting literature and preparations my daughter Lucia brought home fascinated me, as a dedicated biologist, and created the desire to study this field more deeply…Thus, I enthusiastically commenced literature reading and investigation of the small water bodies in my surroundings at the beginning of the year 1924. Within nine months, I got a rather solid knowledge in drawing and identifying many species."

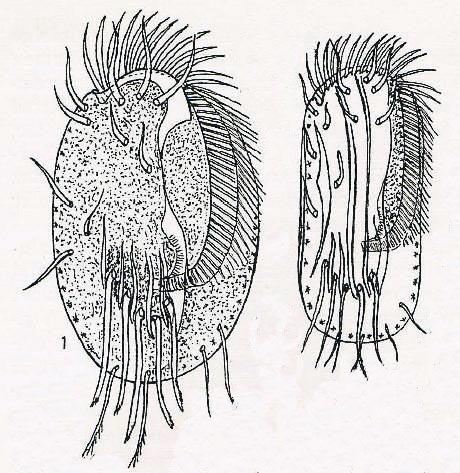
The ciliates Euplotes harpa and Euplotes extensum, from vol. III of Wimpertiere oder Ciliata

Kahl's first scholarly work, published in 1926 when he was 49 years old, was a 241-page monograph on "new and little-known forms of holotrich and heterotrich ciliates." In the course of the next nine years, he issued a steady series of important articles, culminating in his compendious, 4-volume study of free-living ciliates, Wimpertiere oder Ciliata (Infusoria), published as part of a series on German wildlife, edited by the zoologist Friedrich Dahl. This lavishly illustrated work, which combines new research with meticulous historical and taxonomic investigations, was completed in 1935. At this point, Kahl abruptly stopped publishing.

The reasons for Kahl's withdrawal from the field are not known. The ciliatologist Wilhelm Foissner speculates that he was discouraged by harsh criticism from academic colleagues, and rejection by academic journals. Despite these setbacks, his work continued to win admirers among researchers involved in the classification and identification of ciliates. Sometime in the early 1940s he returned to his microscope, producing the first part of what was supposed to be another 4-volume treatise on the infusoria. The first volume made it into print. However, in the turmoil and confusion of wartime Germany, the second part of the projected work was lost, and the remaining sections were never completed. In November 1946 (the exact date is uncertain) Alfred Kahl died of unknown causes, at the age of 69.

== Working methods and legacy ==
Kahl worked alone, using a basic monocular microscope, equipped with an oil-immersion objective providing a maximum magnification of 500X. He preferred to examine living subjects, and rarely used fixed specimens or chemical stains. From his close scrutiny of living organisms, he produced simple informative freehand drawings to accompany his written observations.

Despite his simple procedures, absence of collaborators and lack of formal training, he came to dominate his field, to the extent that the period from 1930 to 1950 has been characterized as the "Kahlian era" of ciliate systematics. During his decade of activity, he nearly doubled the number of known ciliate species, and created a body of scholarship that is still cited with regularity. This accomplishment has been described by the ciliatologist John O. Corliss as an "unbelievable record [that] has never been--and is hardly ever likely to be--met in the annals of protozoology and microscopy, past, present, or future."

== Selected publications ==
- Kahl A. (1930–35) "Urtiere oder Protozoa I: Wimpertiere oder Ciliata (Infusoria)." In Die Tierwelt Deutschlands 18, (Ed. F. Dahl). G. Fischer, Jena.
  - I. Allgemeiner Teil und Prostomata, 1930, p. 1-180 : Online lesen
  - II. Holotricha (außer den im vol. 1), 1931, p. 181-398 : Online lesen
  - III. Spirotricha, 1933 p. 399-650 : Online lesen
  - IV. Peritricha and Chonotricha, 1935, p. 651-886 : Online lesen
- Kahl A. Untitled Monograph of 1943 (on Prostomatean ciliates). In Acta Protozoologica 2004 (Suppl.) 43: 11 - 69.
- Kahl's Keys to the Ciliates. (Ebook). English translation of the keys from Wimpertiere oder Ciliata, by David J. Patterson. 1978, University of Bristol.
