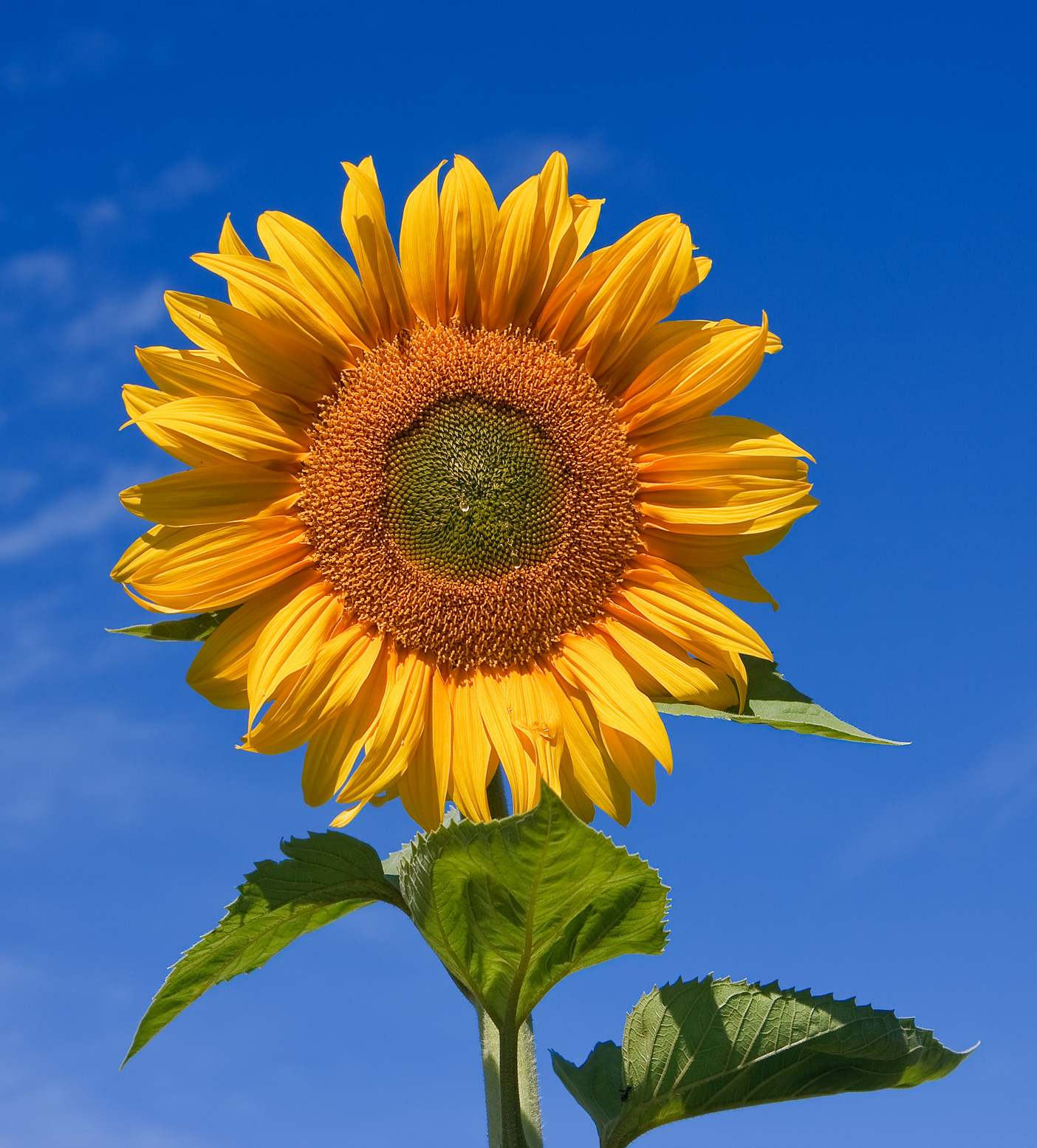
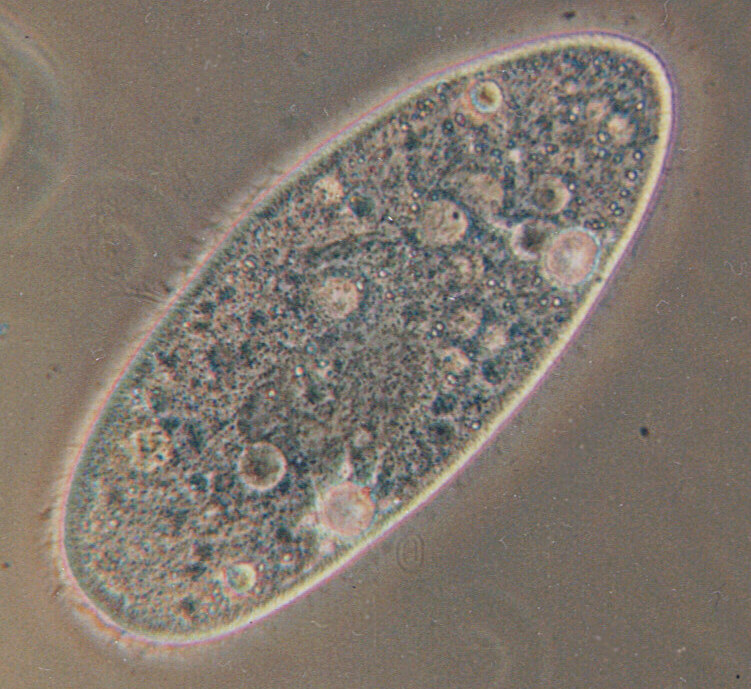
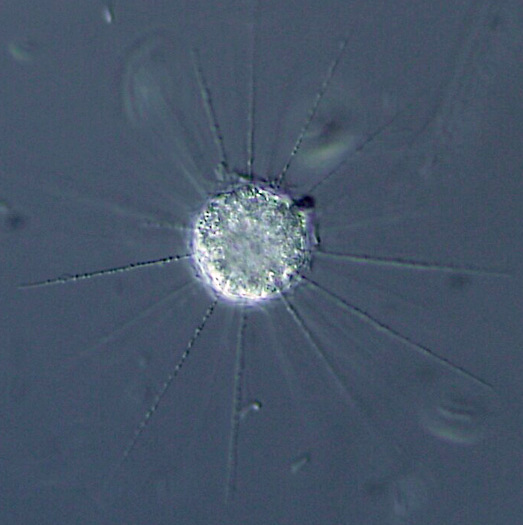
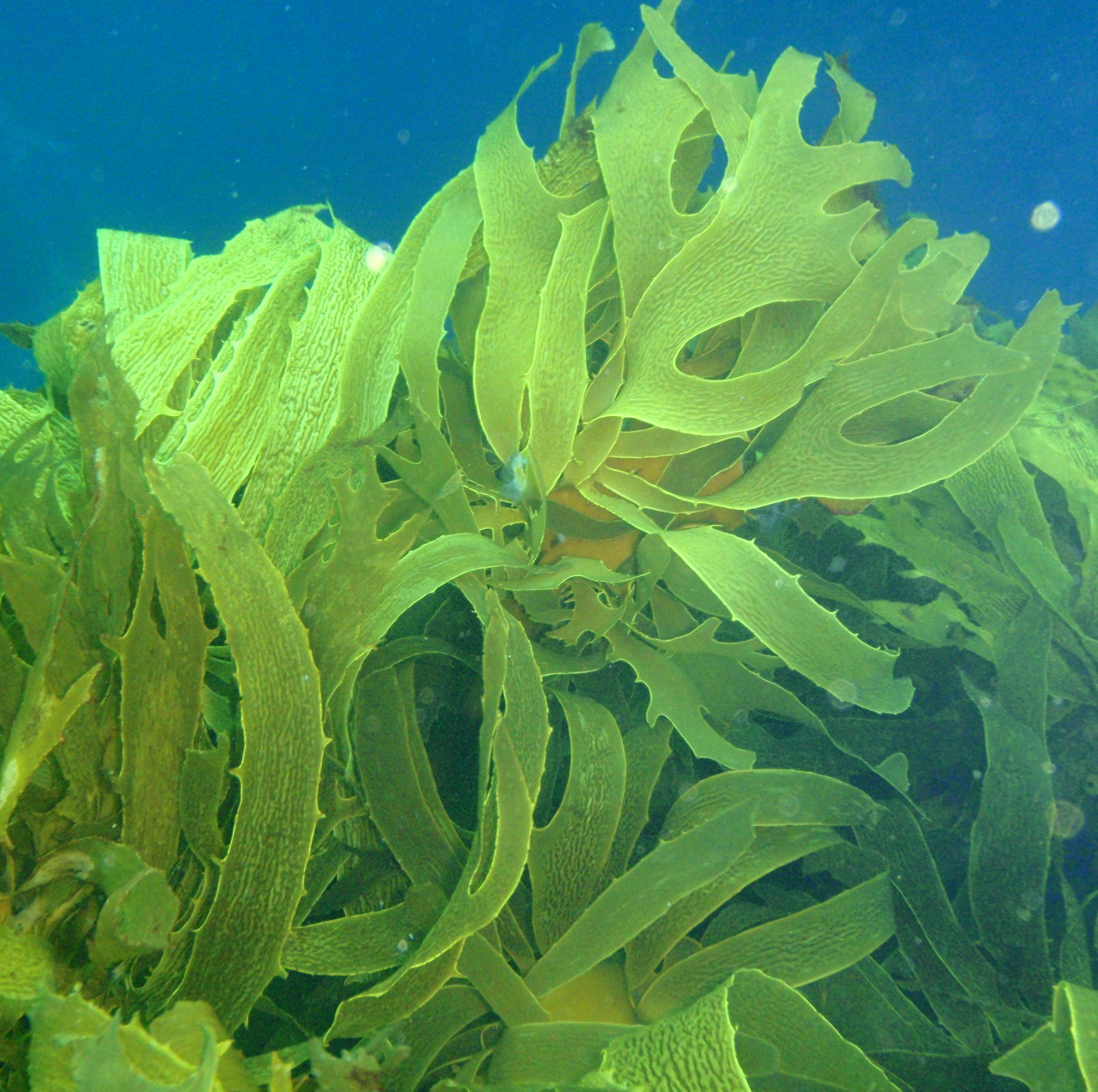
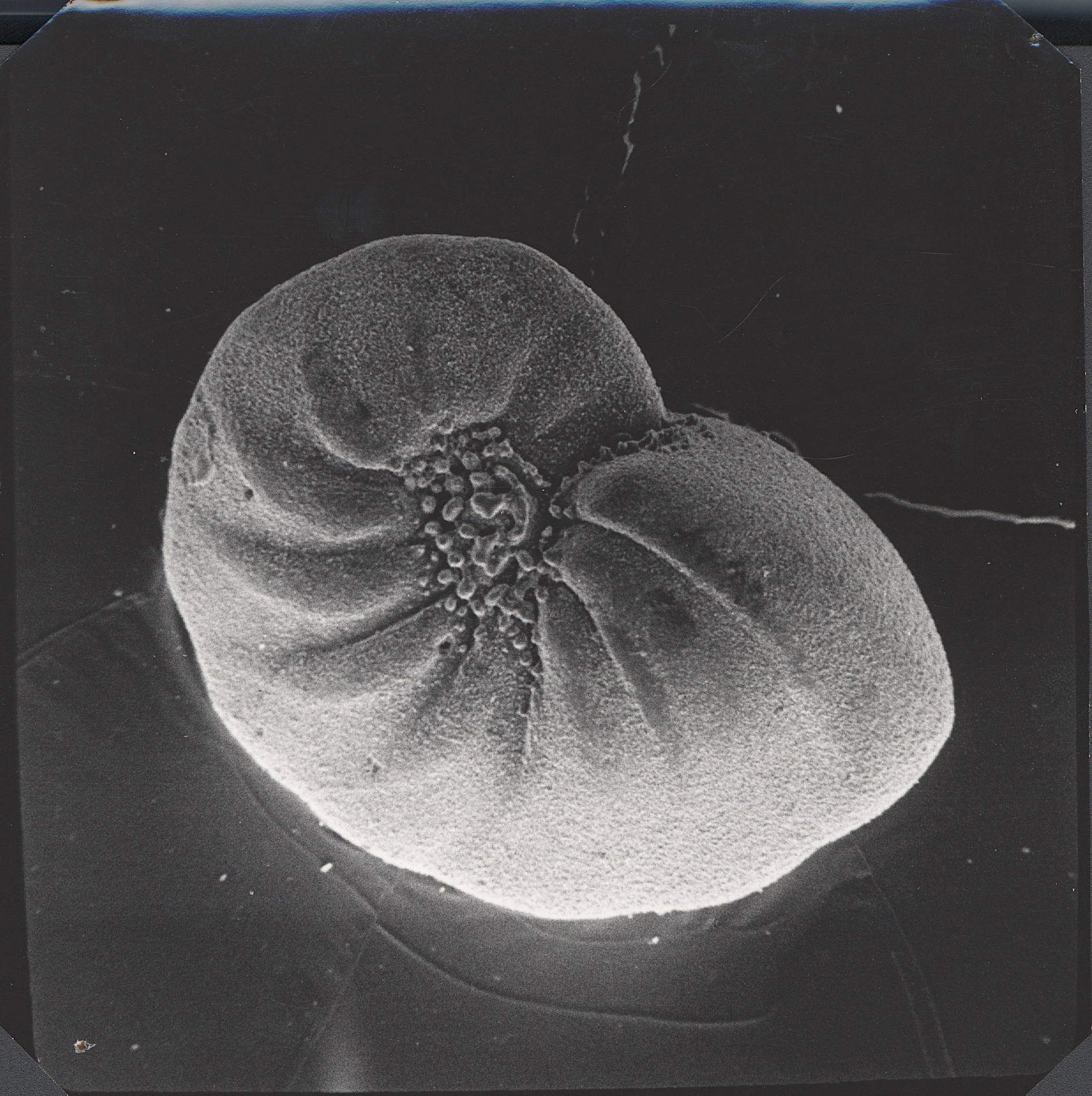
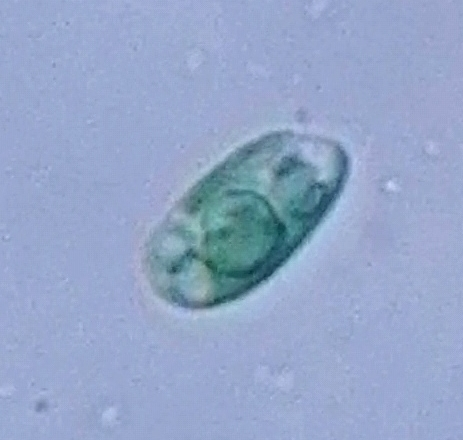
- Diaphoretickes diversity (clockwise from top left): common sunflower (Archaeplastida), ciliate (Alveolata), kelp (Stramenopiles), cryptomonad (Cryptista), foram (Rhizaria), centrohelid (Haptista)

Scientific classification
- Domain: Eukaryota
- Clade: Diaphoretickes; Adl et al. 2012

Major subdivisions
- Telonemia; Haptista; Disparia; CAM; Archaeplastida (includes plants); Pancryptista; SAR; Stramenopiles; Alveolata; Rhizaria; And see text

Synonyms
- Corticata Lankester 1878, emend. Cavalier-Smith 2015 (Note: The taxonomic name Corticata has changed in composition several times. It was first coined by zoologist Edwin Ray Lankester in 1878 as one of the two categories of the Protozoa (the other being Gymnomyxa), which he interpreted as a subkingdom of animals. In his system, Corticata included flagellated protists, many of which fall in Diaphoretickes (e.g., heterokonts, dinoflagellates, ciliates), while Gymnomyxa (meaning 'naked slime') included amoebae. In 2002, evolutionary biologist Thomas Cavalier-Smith adopted these two names as subkingdoms of his own proposed kingdom Protozoa. He redefined Corticata to group Excavata and Rhizaria, due to similarities in their cytoskeleton. This definition was polyphyletic and fell out of use. Cavalier-Smith repurposed Corticata in 2015 as the superkingdom containing Chromista and Plantae (Archaeplastida).)

= Diaphoretickes =

Diaphoretickes Temporal range: Paleoproterozoic–Present

Clade of eukaryotes

Diaphoretickes (from Greek διαφορετικές (diaforetikés) 'diverse') is a major evolutionary lineage, or clade, of eukaryotic organisms spanning over 600,000 species. They comprise an enormous diversity of life forms, from single-celled protozoa to multicellular plants and numerous types of algae. The clade was discovered through phylogenetic analyses in the 21st century that revealed a close relationship between the supergroups Archaeplastida (or plants in a broad sense), Haptista, Cryptista, and SAR (Stramenopiles, Alveolata and Rhizaria).

Before molecular analyses recovered this clade, evolutionary biologist Thomas Cavalier-Smith had already hypothesized an evolutionary proximity between plants and the remaining groups (collectively known as 'chromalveolates' in his classification system). He coined the term photokaryotes for these organisms, as they include almost all of the photosynthetic eukaryotes. He later called them corticates due to the presence of cortical alveoli in many of their members.

Although Diaphoretickes contains organisms of very different morphologies, they have a few common traits. Ancestrally they are similar to excavates, with two flagella and a ventral feeding groove. In addition, the presence of cortical alveoli and flagellar hairs are interpreted as ancestral traits unique to the group. Some traits appeared convergently in many groups, such as the acquisition of chloroplasts through primary and secondary endosymbioses and the presence of axopodia and a heliozoan-type cell. In particular, chloroplasts with chlorophyll c and heliozoan cells are exclusive to Diaphoretickes.

Within Diaphoretickes, Cryptista and the heliozoan Microheliella maris form the clade Pancryptista, which is the closest relative to Archaeplastida, together forming the CAM clade. Haptista and SAR are closer to each other and to a clade of flagellates known as Telonemia. In addition, three small groups of protists, Provora, Hemimastigophora and Meteora sporadica, form a clade that may belong to Diaphoretickes.

== Etymology ==
The name Diaphoretickes derives from Greek διαφορετικές (diaforetikés) meaning diverse, dissimilar, referring to the wide morphological and cellular diversity among members of this clade.

== History ==
Eukaryotes, organisms whose cells contain a nucleus, have been traditionally grouped into four kingdoms: animals, plants, fungi and protists. In the late 20th century, molecular phylogenetic analyses revealed that protists are a paraphyletic assortment of many independent evolutionary lineages or clades, from which animals, fungi and plants evolved. However, the relationships between these clades remained difficult to assess due to technological limitations. Starting in the early 2000s, improvements on phylogenetics allowed the classification of most eukaryotes into a small number of diverse clades called supergroups.

In 2008, a close evolutionary relationship was discovered between some of these clades: Archaeplastida (plants and relatives; sometimes known as kingdom Plantae), SAR (stramenopiles, alveolates and rhizarians), and two smaller groups of algae, haptophytes and cryptomonads. This collection of organisms contains almost all eukaryotes capable of photosynthesis.

The SAR, haptophytes and cryptomonads were collectively known as chromalveolates or kingdom Chromista due to a hypothesized common ancestor that obtained the ability to photosynthesize, as algae included in them usually contain a unique pigment, chlorophyll c. The relationship between plants and chromalveolates had been described earlier by evolutionary biologist Thomas Cavalier-Smith (1942–2021), who referred to the clade containing both groups as photokaryotes since most of their members are photosynthetic. He later called them corticates, suggesting that they share a common ancestor due to the presence of cortical alveoli (vesicles underneath the cell membrane) in some of their members (glaucophytes and alveolates). However, these names became obsolete, largely due to the discovery that chromalveolates are not monophyletic: these algae evolved the ability to photosynthesize independently from one another.

In 2012, a publication by the International Society of Protistologists (ISOP) established a taxonomic name for this clade, Diaphoretickes, with the following phylogenetic definition:

"The most inclusive clade containing Bigelowiella natans Moestrup & Sengco 2001 (Rhizaria), Tetrahymena thermophila Nanney & McCoy 1976 (Alveolata), Thalassiosira pseudonana Cleve 1873 (Stramenopiles), and Arabidopsis thaliana (Linnaeus) Heynhold, 1842 (Archaeplastida), but not Homo sapiens Linnaeus 1758 (Opisthokonta), Dictyostelium discoideum Raper 1935 (Amoebozoa) or Euglena gracilis Klebs 1883 (Excavata). This is a branch-based definition in which all of the specifiers are extant."

In the following years, higher quality phylogenetic analyses recovered more protists that fall into this definition (e.g., telonemids, centrohelids, katablepharids), leading to new clades within Diaphoretickes, such as Haptista (centrohelids and haptophytes) and Cryptista (cryptomonads, katablepharids and relatives).

In 2015, Cavalier-Smith and co-authors rejected the name Diaphoretickes proposed by the ISOP, arguing that it was "an entirely unnecessary, and less euphonious third synonym with no intuitive meaning [...] which is destabilising and should not be used". Instead, they suggested converting a pre-existing taxonomic name, Corticata, for the superkingdom containing Chromista and Plantae (Archaeplastida). This did not reach consensus.

== Description ==
=== Diversity ===
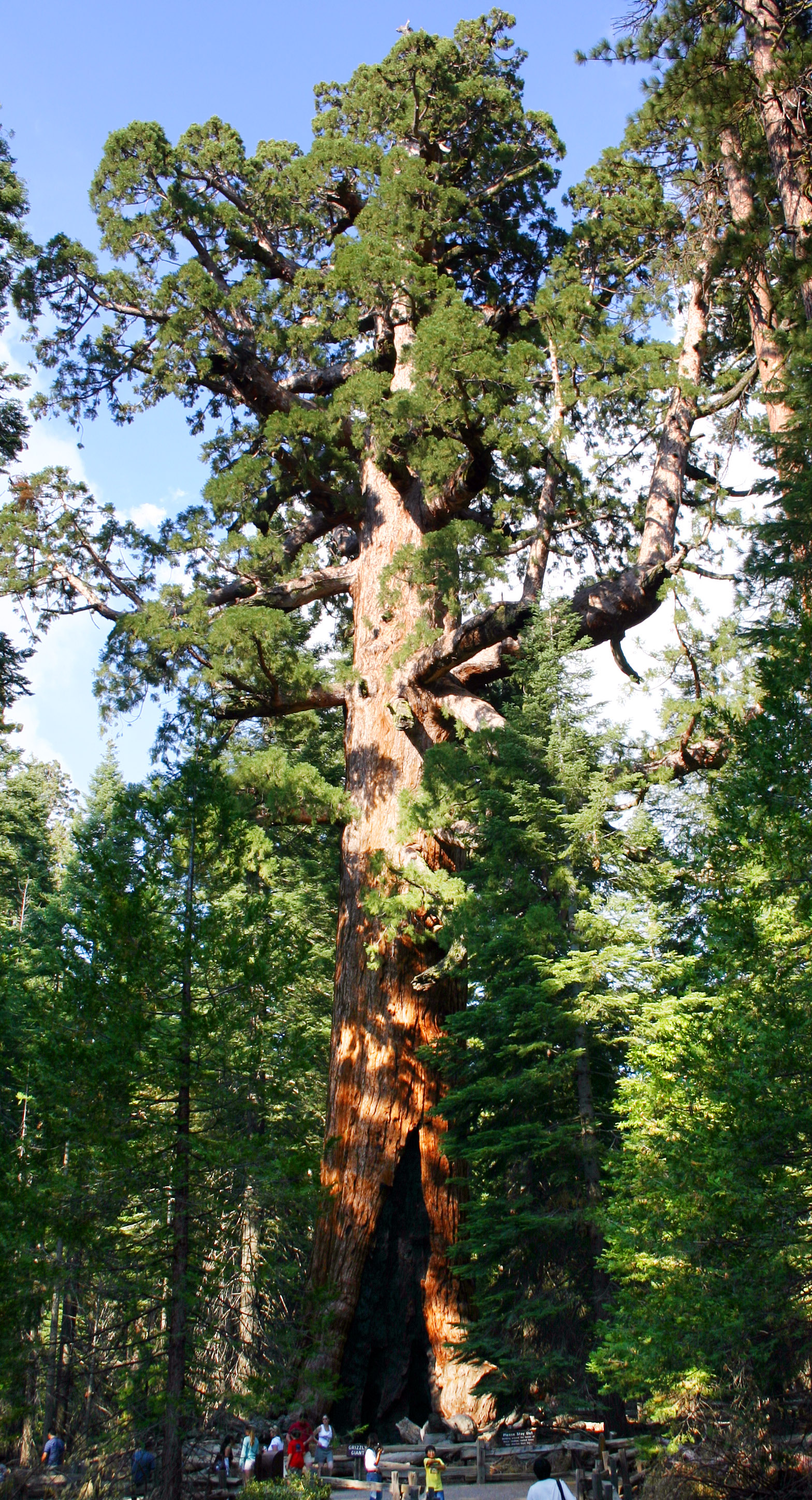
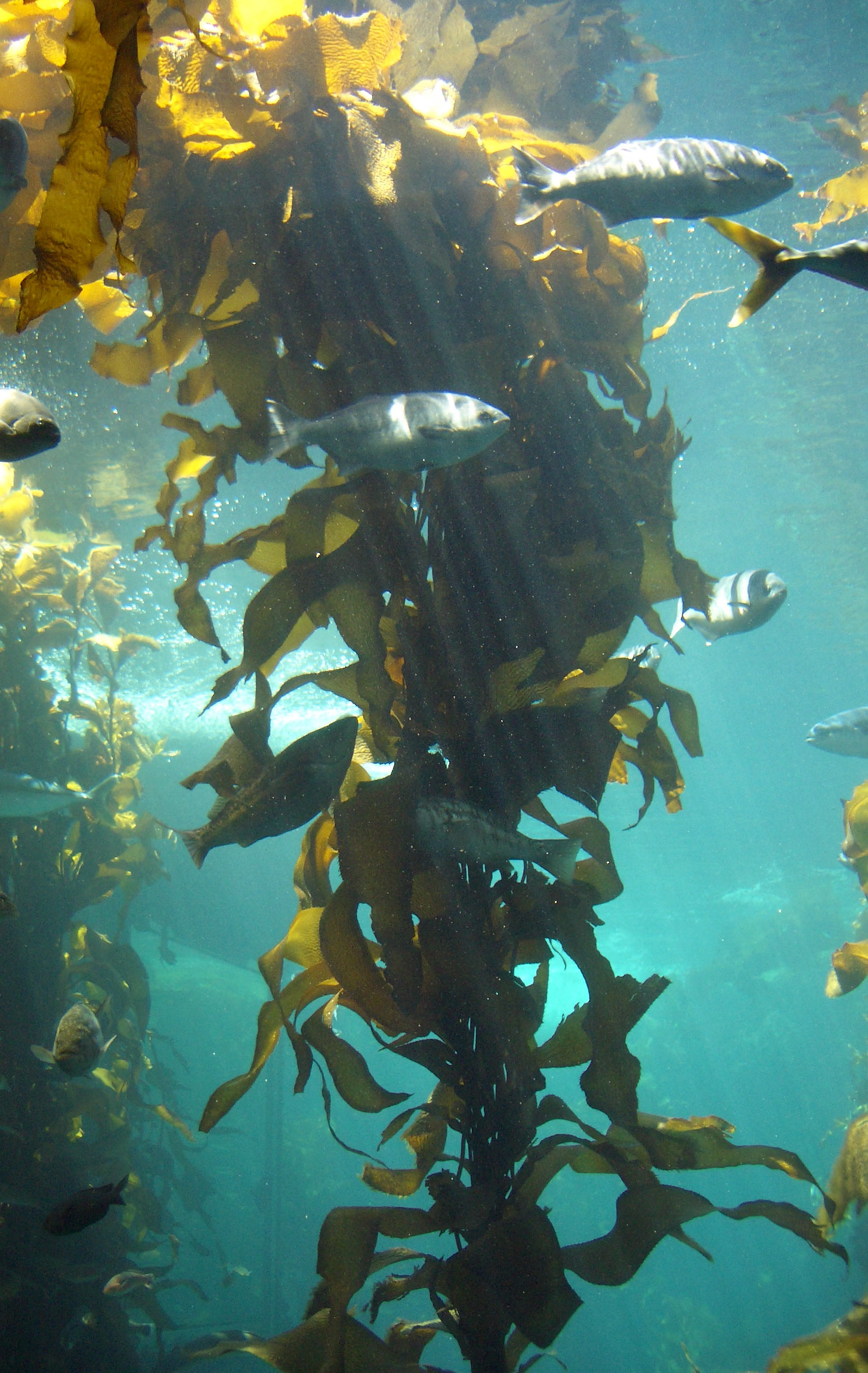
Two examples of large multicellular organisms in Diaphoretickes: the giant redwood (left) and the giant kelp (right)
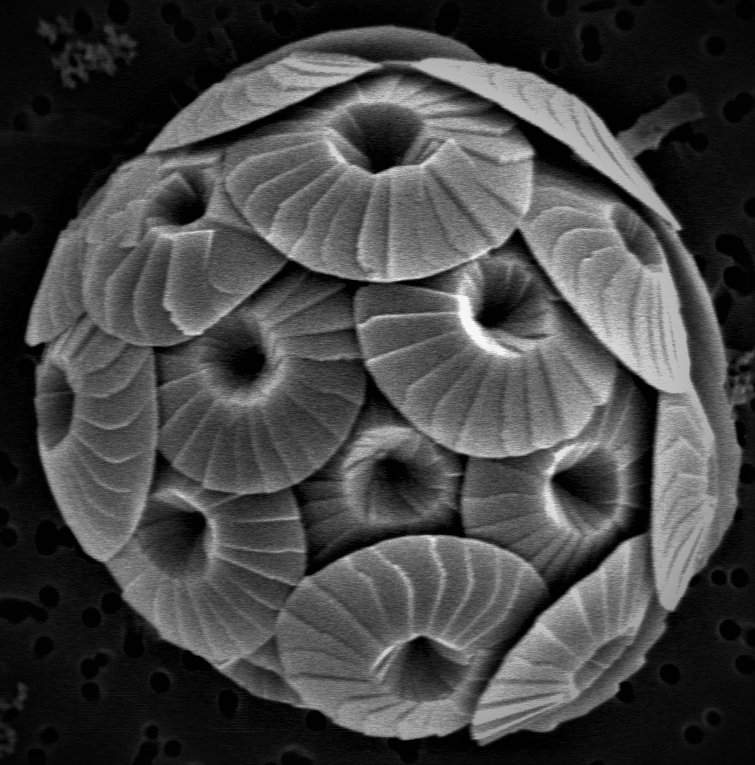
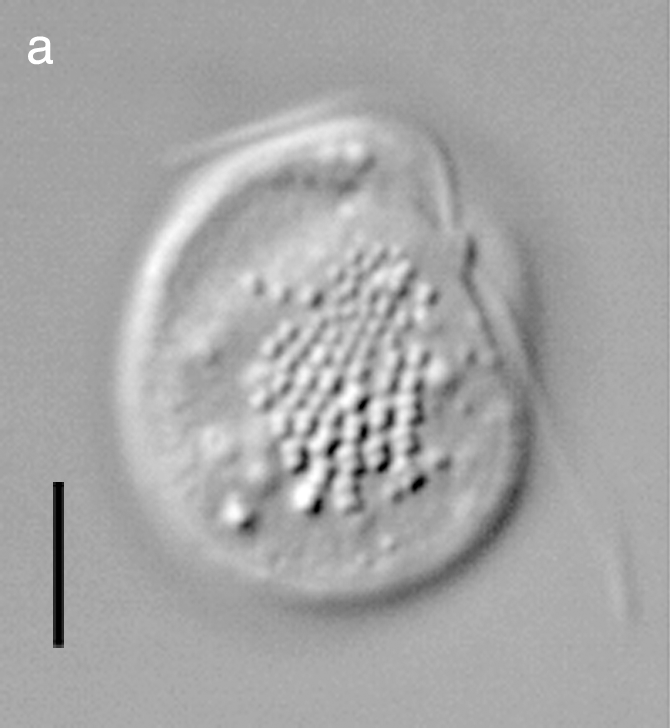
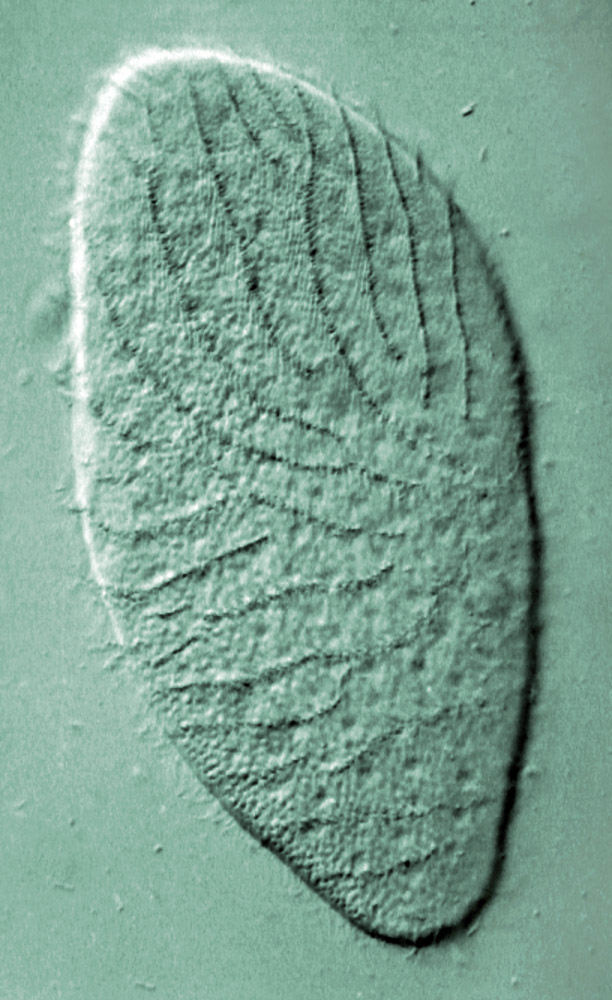
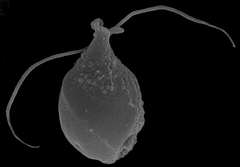
Diversity of single-celled organisms in Diaphoretickes (clockwise from top left): a coccolithophore (Haptista), a katablepharid (Cryptista), a telonemid (Telonemia), and an opalinid (Stramenopiles)

Diaphoretickes includes eukaryotes of very different morphologies, cellular structures, life cycles and habitats. They range from photosynthetic algae to highly specialized parasites and even large, multicellular organisms like land plants. As such, they include most of the Earth's biomass, with land plants alone occupying over 81% of the total planet biomass. Its major groups are: Archaeplastida, SAR supergroup, Haptista and Cryptista. Also included is a small group of single-celled flagellates known as Telonemia, which contains 7 species.

Archaeplastida includes organisms with chloroplasts derived directly from a primary endosymbiosis event with a cyanobacterium. They amount to an estimated 450,000–500,000 species. Known as plants by some authors, archaeplastids include many protists that do not belong to the multicellular land plants or embryophytes (such as mosses, conifers, ferns, flowering plants), these protists are primarily the red algae, glaucophyte algae, and green algae, from which embryophytes evolved. Archaeplastids also include two small groups of heterotrophic flagellates closely related to red algae: rhodelphids and picozoans. Embryophytes, green algae and red algae all evolved multicellular forms and complex life cycles independently, but embryophytes are distinguished by the retention of the zygote (fertilized egg cell) as an embryo, instead of its dispersal as a single cell.

The SAR supergroup is named after its three constituent clades: stramenopiles, alveolates and rhizarians. The stramenopiles gather more than 100,000 species in total and comprise many heterotrophic unicellular or fungus-like organisms (e.g., oomycetes, labyrinthulids, bicosoecids, opalinids), but the described diversity is concentrated in the ochrophytes, the photosynthetic clade (e.g., diatoms, kelp, golden algae). They are distinguished by the presence of straw-like mastigonemes (flagellar hairs) in one of their two flagella, when present. The alveolates are unicellular protists primarily composed of three large, well-studied groups: ciliates (more than 8,000 species, mostly free-living heterotrophs), dinoflagellates (~4,500 species, many photosynthetic) and apicomplexans (more than 6,000 parasitic species), all of which are unicellular. In particular, dinoflagellates, apicomplexans and various smaller groups (e.g., chromerids) evolved from a photosynthetic ancestor and are collectively known as myzozoans. The rhizarians are a diverse group of mostly amoeboid unicellular organisms of very different lifestyles, such as the free-living radiolarians (over 1,000 living species) and forams (over 6,700 living species), the fungus-like phytomyxeans, the parasitic ascetosporeans, and the photosynthetic chlorarachniophytes.

Haptista is composed of two groups of single-celled organisms with mineralized scales. The first are the photosynthetic haptophytes (e.g., the calcifying coccolithophores), of which there are over 500 living species. The second are the heterotrophic centrohelid amoebae, with around 95 species. Cryptista is a group of fully single-celled flagellated organisms, among which are the photosynthetic cryptomonads (more than 100 species) and related heterotrophs, namely the katablepharids and the species Palpitomonas bilix.

=== Ancestral traits ===
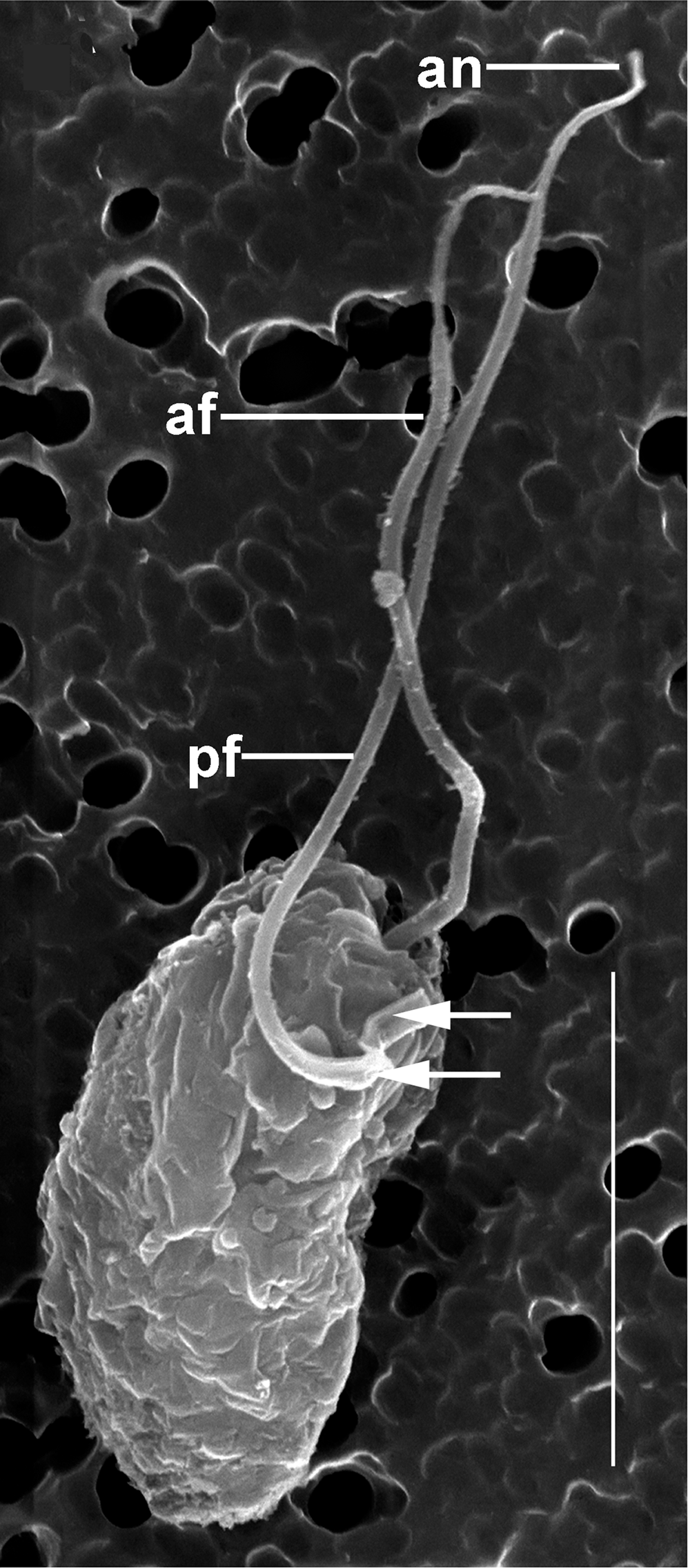
The cell of Colponema resembles the ancestral corticate, with its anterior (af) and posterior (pf) flagella. The ventral groove can just be seen at the top of the cell body.

Despite their large diversity of forms, a few morphological traits are common to corticates. They are biflagellates or bikonts, meaning their cells typically have two flagella. Their cells ancestrally have a ventral groove for feeding, as observed in early-branching species (e.g., the alveolate Colponema and the stramenopiles Kaonashia and Platysulcus). These cellular traits are typical of excavates, a paraphyletic group composed of the most basal eukaryotes (i.e., Discoba, Metamonada and Malawimonadida); they are likely the ancestral traits of all eukaryotes.

In addition, as opposed to excavates, many Diaphoretickes members have cortical alveoli (flattened vesicles beneath the cell surface), such as glaucophytes, alveolates, haptophytes, telonemids and some early-branching stramenopiles (e.g., Kaonashia, bigyromonads). Due to the wide occurrence of these alveoli, various researchers consider them an ancestral characteristic of Diaphoretickes. Another frequent trait is the presence of flagellar hairs, also considered ancestral and unique to Diaphoretickes.

=== Convergent traits ===
Multiple lineages within Diaphoretickes have acquired photosynthetic plastids independently from each other, evolving into algae. They include all eukaryotic algae except for euglenophyceans, which belong to the Discoba. Archaeplastids acquired their plastids directly from primary endosymbiosis with a cyanobacterium, while all other algae have plastids originating from a secondary endosymbiosis with either a red alga (as in ochrophytes, myzozoans, cryptomonads and haptophytes) or a green alga (as in chlorarachniophytes). Red algal-derived plastids are exclusive to the Diaphoretickes clade, while green algal-derived ones are also present in euglenophyceans. One rhizarian species, Paulinella chromatophora, experienced an event of primary endosymbiosis with a different kind of cyanobacterium.

The exact order of the red algal-derived plastid acquisitions is not yet known. Two main hypotheses agree that cryptomonads were the first to obtain them, and the remaining groups obtained theirs by endosymbiosis with a cryptomonad. A third hypothesis proposed in 2024 suggests that there were two independent endosymbioses of a red alga in cryptomonads and ochrophytes, which in turn originated the plastids of haptophytes and myzozoans, respectively.

Plastid acquisitions across eukaryotes, shown in discontinuous arrows: blue for the primary plastids derived directly from a cyanobacterium, and red and green for the secondary plastids derived from red algae and green algae, respectively. Red arrows are placed according to the 2024 hypothesis; disagreements with previous hypotheses are marked '?'.

Diaphoretickes also includes all amoebae that have axopodia, stiff filaments used for feeding that branch radially from the cell, a trait acquired independently in various groups. These were historically known as Actinopoda, and were divided into the marine radiolaria (rhizarians) and the mostly freshwater heliozoa ("sun animalcules"). The heliozoa are primarily the centrohelids (relatives of haptophytes), actinophryids (stramenopiles) and desmothoracids (rhizarians). Valkomonas, a heliozoan, is incertae sedis within Diaphoretickes. Even a heliozoan genus that has not been genetically sequenced, Berkeleyaesol, is thought to possibly belong to Diaphoretickes. Cavalier-Smith argued that the ancestral configuration of the cytoskeleton of corticates was a preadaptation that made it easier for them to evolve axopodia numerous independent times.

== Evolution ==
Evolutionary relationships are still uncertain between the different clades of Diaphoretickes. Haptista and Cryptista, initially hypothesized as relatives of each other (collectively known as the taxon Hacrobia), were later revealed to be more distantly related. In particular, Cryptista and the species Microheliella maris form a clade known as Pancryptista, which in turn is the closest relative of Archaeplastida, together forming the CAM clade. Telonemia, previously assigned to Hacrobia, is sometimes resolved as the sister clade of the SAR supergroup, forming the hypothesized TSAR clade, while other studies resolve it as more closely related to Haptista.

Three small groups of protists—provorans, hemimastigotes, and the species Meteora sporadica—form a clade that may be either related to or inside of Diaphoretickes, depending on the analysis. Before phylogenomic data from Meteora and provorans became available, there was already a known affinity between hemimastigotes and Diaphoretickes, although the exact position of hemimastigotes remained unclear. Cavalier-Smith proposed that hemimastigotes were the closest relatives of Diaphoretickes (known by him as corticates), and established the name eucorta (eu-, 'well-developed' and cortex, 'bark') for their suggested clade, since both groups have a cortical pellicle: with cortical alveoli in corticates, and with microtubules and a proteinaceous thickening in hemimastigotes instead. According to the phylogenetic definition of Diaphoretickes, any organism that is more closely related to them than to Discoba or Amorphea is considered part of them, which renders 'eucorta' a synonym of Diaphoretickes.

The following cladogram summarizes the relationships within Diaphoretickes, according to phylogenomic analyses of the 2020s. Clades containing chromalveolates are marked *; clades containing heliozoa are marked **.

- Diaphoretickes (=Corticata)
  - - SAR
      - Halvaria
        - Stramenopiles**
        - Alveolata*
      - Rhizaria**
    - Telonemia
    - Haptista**
    - - Disparia
        - Provora
        - Membrifera
  - - CAM
      - Pancryptista
        - Microheliella**
        - Cryptista*
      - Archaeplastida plastids
        - Rhodaria
          - - Rhodophyta (red algae)
            - Rhodelphidia
          - Picozoa
        - - Glaucophyta
          - Viridiplantae (green algae & plants)

There is uncertainty regarding relationships with the remaining eukaryotic clades. Between Diaphoretickes and Amorphea, the two major clades of eukaryotes, there are many smaller clades—Discoba, Metamonada, Malawimonadida, Ancyromonadida, CRuMs, and the aforementioned provoran-hemimastigote-Meteora clade—that may branch closer to one or the other, or closer to the root of the eukaryotic tree, depending on the analysis. Only some analyses find a closer relationship between Diaphoretickes and the Discoba clade, together known as Diphoda. According to a 2021 molecular clock analysis, Diaphoretickes diverged from other eukaryotes during the Paleoproterozoic (2.2 to 1.6 billion years ago), although the first putative fossils originated during the Mesoproterozoic.
