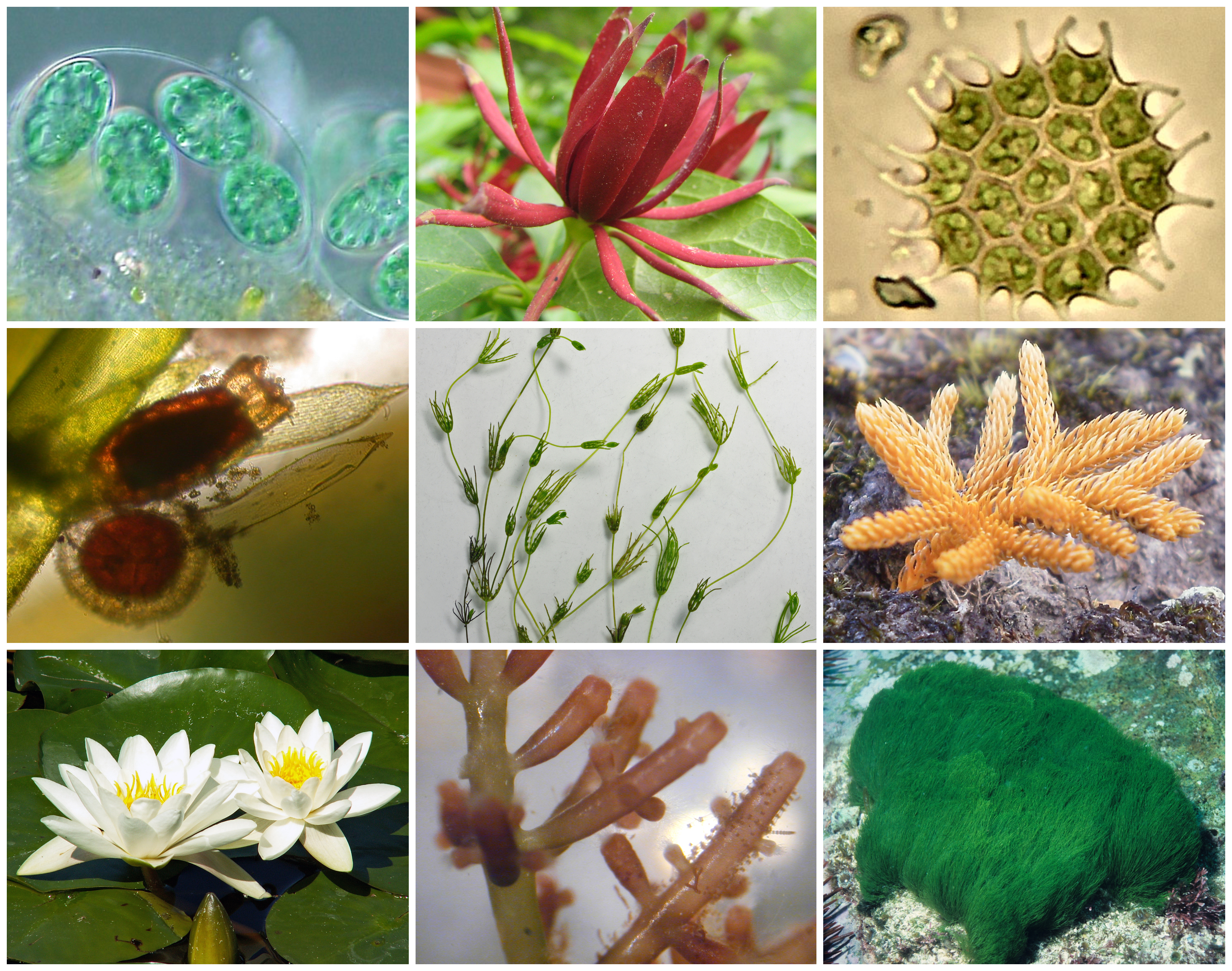
- Several images showing the diversity of the Archaeplastida.
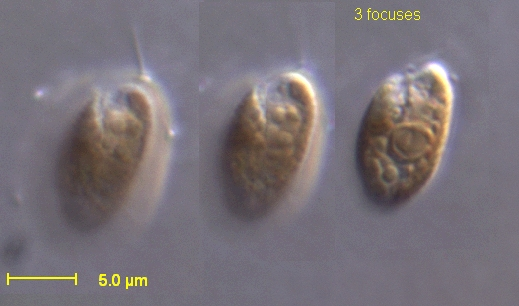
- Rhodomonas salina, a pancryptist.

Scientific classification
- Domain: Eukaryota
- Clade: Diaphoretickes
- Clade: CAM; Yazaki et al. 2022

Subgroups
- Pancryptista; Cryptista; Microheliella; Archaeplastida; Rhodaria; Pararhoda?; Picozoa; Rhodelphidia; Rhodophyta; Glaucophyta; Viridiplantae

= CAM (clade) =

Clade of eukaryotes

The CAM clade is a clade containing the Archaeplastida (Plantae sensu lato) and the clade Pancryptista (which, in turn, contains Cryptista and Microheliella maris). This clade is supported by phylogenomic analyses from 2022 that mainly support the clade Pancryptista, but also mention that its closest lineage is Archaeplastida, making them sister taxa. Together, they form the clade CAM, which stands for the constituent clades (Cryptista, Archaeplastida, and Microheliella).

== Phylogeny ==
The following cladogram shows the placement of the subclades within CAM:

- CAM
  - Archaeplastida
    - Rhodaria
      - - Rhodelphidia
        - Rhodophyta
      - Picozoa
    - - Viridiplantae
      - Glaucophyta
  - Pancryptista
    - Cryptista
    - Microheliella
