= Cyanophora kugrensii =

Scientific classification
- Clade: Archaeplastida
- Division: Glaucophyta
- Class: Glaucophyceae
- Order: Glaucocystales
- Family: Glaucocystaceae
- Genus: Cyanophora
- Species: C. kugrensii

Binomial name
- Cyanophora kugrensii Tos.Takah. & Nozaki 2014

Cyanophora kugrensii is an algal species classified as a glaucophyte. It was first described as a distinct species in 2014, identified from a strain collected in 1987 in Jōsō, Ibaraki Prefecture, Japan.

== Morphology ==
Cells of C. kugrensii range in size from 5 to 15 μm in length and from 2 to 6 μm in width, with a shape described as "elongate-ovoid". C. kugrensii lacks the pointed posterior found in its close relative Cyanophora cuspidata, containing instead a rounded end. Cells contain 1-2 plastids.
