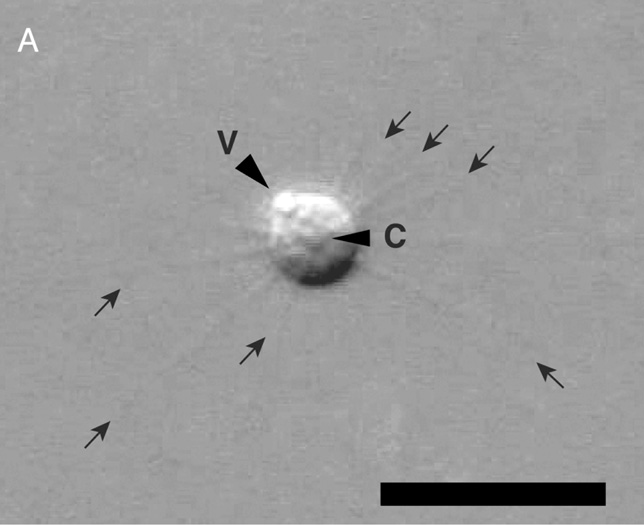
- Differential interference contrast image of a living cell of M. maris showing axopodia (arrows), tiny vacuole (V) and centrosome (C). Scale bar: 10 μm.

Scientific classification
- Domain: Eukaryota
- Clade: Pancryptista
- Order: Microhelida; Cavalier-Smith in Yabuki et al. 2012
- Family: Microheliellidae; Cavalier-Smith in Yabuki et al. 2012
- Genus: Microheliella; Cavalier-Smith & Chao in Yabuki et al. 2012
- Species: M. maris

Binomial name
- Microheliella maris Cavalier-Smith & Chao in Yabuki et al. 2012, emend. Shishkin in Shishkin, Drachko & Zlatogursky 2021

Subgroups
- CCAP 1945/1; Erebor

= Microheliella =

Genus of protists

Microheliella (from Greek micro 'small' and helios 'sun') is a monotypic genus of protists containing the sole species M. maris, first described in 2012. It is the sole species in the order Microhelida. Microheliella has a variety of unusual morphological characteristics which make its broader classification difficult. These include a centrosome with two concentric granular shells and axopodia much simpler in structure than in visually similar protists (other 'heliozoa').

== Etymology ==
The generic name Microheliella, as well as the names of the family Microheliellidae and order Microhelida, derive from Greek micro 'small' and helios 'sun', referring to the small cell size and the authors' wishes to retain the original informal name 'microheliozoan' given to this organism prior to its formal description. The specific epithet maris refers to seawater, its natural habitat.

== Taxonomy ==
The genus Microheliella was described from an organism discovered contaminating a culture of the amoeba Cochliopodium from the Ebro Delta, Spain, collected in 2003 by Alexey Smirnov. This organism was subsequently transferred into a pure culture through serial dilution and maintained at Oxford for nine years in a growth medium of 50% artificial seawater, with naturally occurring bacteria as its food. Initially, it was given the informal name 'marine microheliozoan', and a phylogenetic analysis using 18S and 28S rRNA sequences placed it close to centrohelids. Later, the same organism was examined under electron microscopy and its Hsp90 gene was sequenced. Combining the newly obtained morphological and genetic data, it was formally described by Thomas Cavalier-Smith and Ema E. Chao in 2012 as the novel species Microheliella maris. Its type culture, CCAP 1945/1, is kept in the Culture Collection of Algae and Protozoa at Oban, in Scotland.

To accommodate this genus, the monotypic family Microheliellidae and order Microhelida were created, and classified as part of the phylum Heliozoa in accordance to phylogenetic analyses. Although the genus Heliomorpha was not analyzed, it was thought as the sister group of this genus. Two genera were classified in a new class Endohelea. Endohelea was assigned to phylum Heliozoa, its other class being Centrohelea. In 2021, Yegon Shishkin described a sister clade of CCAP 1945/1 and named it as "Erebor" under the PhyloCode. This clade was given the diagnosis of:

"The clade is characterized by the apomorphy of the second helix of 15th hairpin of the SSU rRNA molecule, which is derived compared to other Microhelida in the same or more degree as in the Microheliella maris ZI172 strain, as inherited by the specimens of Microheliella maris ZI172 strain (Fig. 4)."

In 2022, phylogenomic analyses demonstrated its position as the sister clade to Cryptista, in a clade known as Pancryptista. Later, in a phylogenetic analysis Heliomorpha was recovered as a cercozoan, proving the original classification wrong.

== Evolution ==
Phylogenomic analyses suggest the Microhelida are sister to the Cryptista. The two groups form a clade called Pancryptista, which would be sister to the Archaeplastida.

- CAM
  - Archaeplastida
    - - - Rhodelphidia
        - Rhodophyta
      - Picozoa
    - - Chloroplastida
      - Glaucophyta
  - Pancryptista
    - Microheliella
    - Cryptista

A 2025 paper recovered Microheliella as a member of Pancryptista.
