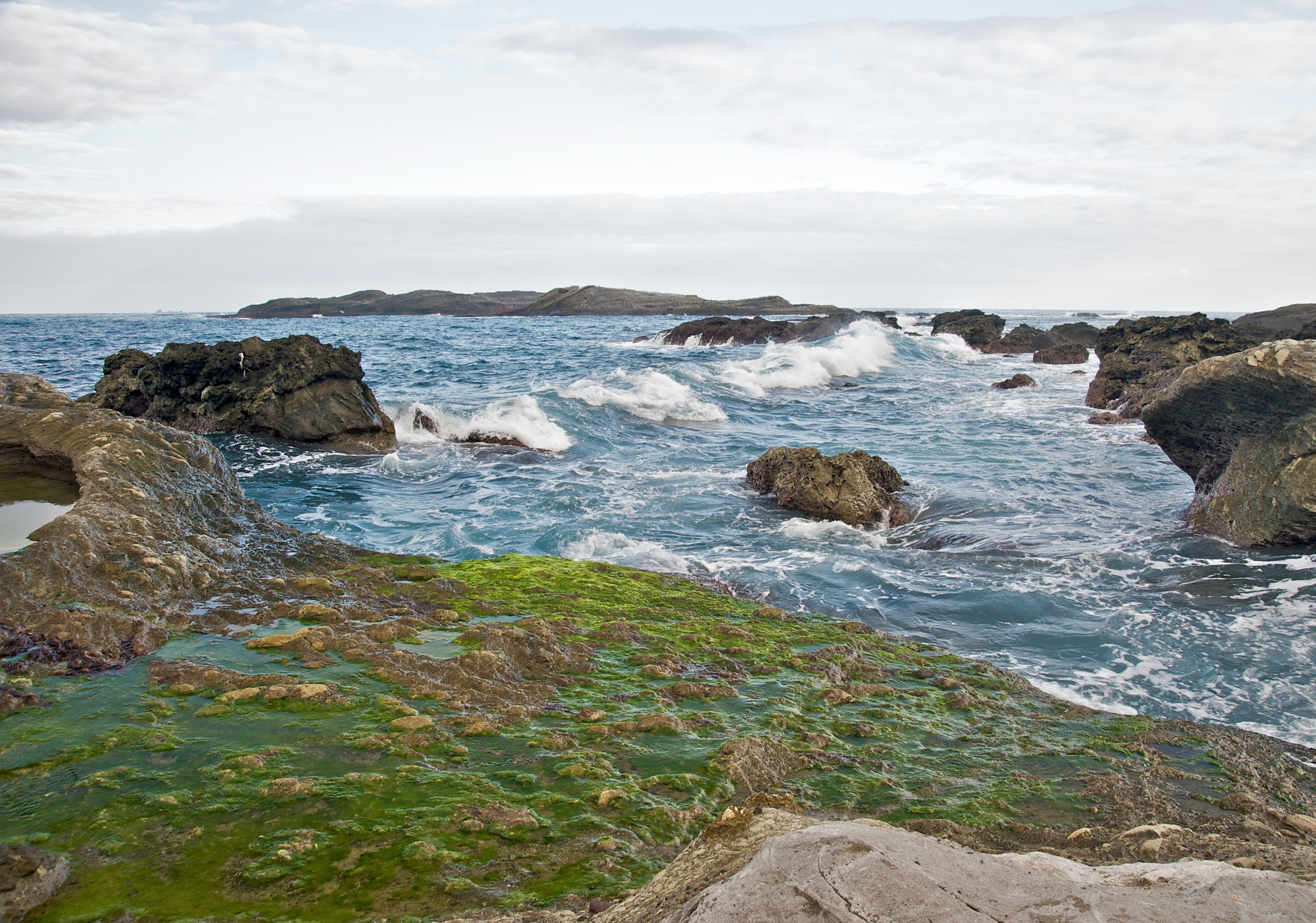
- An assortment of thallophyte Viridiplantae in a rock pool, Taiwan

Scientific classification
- Domain: Eukaryota
- Clade: Diaphoretickes
- Clade: CAM
- Clade: Archaeplastida
- Clade: Viridiplantae; Cavalier-Smith 1981

Subgroups
- Prasinodermophyta; Chlorophyta; Streptophyta; Mesostigmatophyceae; Chlorokybophyceae; Klebsormidiophyceae; Charophyceae; Coleochaetophyceae; Zygnematophyceae; Embryophyta

Synonyms
- Plantae Copeland 1938; Euchlorophyta Whittaker 1969; Chlorophyta Cavalier-Smith 1981 sensu Hoek & Jahns 1978; Chlorobionta Jeffrey 1982, emend. Bremer 1985, emend. Lewis & McCourt 2004; Chlorobiota Kendrick & Crane 1997; Chloroplastida Adl et al. 2005; Viridiplantae Cavalier-Smith 1981; Phyta Barkley 1939, emend. Holt & Uidica 2007; Cormophyta Endlicher 1836; Cormobionta Rothmaler 1948; Euplanta Barkley 1949; Telomobionta Takhtajan 1964; Embryobionta Cronquist et al. 1966; Metaphyta Whittaker 1969

= Viridiplantae =

Viridiplantae Temporal range: Stenian – Present

Clade of archaeplastids including green algae and the land plants

Viridiplantae (New Latin for "green plants"), also known as kingdom Plantae sensu stricto ("plants in a narrow sense"), is a clade of mostly autotrophic eukaryotes that constitutes the largest group within the predominantly photosynthetic superclade Archaeplastida, with around half a million known species that include all green algae and land plants (embryophytes, which evolved from freshwater green algae known as streptophytes). They are important primary producers in both aquatic (marine and freshwater) and terrestrial ecosystems, and are significant contributors to the Earth's oxygen, carbon and water cycles.

Compared to the archaeplastidian sister groups Rhodaria (red algae, rhodelphidians and picozoans) and Glaucophyta ("grey algae"), Viridiplantae are unique in that almost all members (with the exception of parasitic plants and the heterotrophic algae Prototheca) have chloroplasts with both chlorophyll a and chlorophyll b (the latter absent in other archaeplastidians) but lack phycobiliproteins (which are present in other archaeplastidians) — thus typically presenting an untainted green color — and carbohydrates produced by photosynthetic carbon fixation is stored as starch directly inside the chloroplasts or in specialized non-pigmented plastids known as amyloplasts. Their cell walls consist of a network of semicrystalline cellulose microfibrils hydrogen-bonded with minor amounts of hemicellulosic polysaccharides such as xyloglucan and glucuronan, or with the cellulose replaced by mannans as well as sulfated/pyruvylated galactans and arabinans; while "later-diverging charophytes" (charophyceans, coleochaetophyceans, zygnematophyceans and embryophytes) have a framework of cellulose microfibrils embedded in a matrix of pectins, hemicelluloses, arabinogalactans and extensins as well as lignin or lignin-like polymers.

In 2005, Sina Adl and colleagues proposed the name Chloroplastida for the group. In 2012, Frederik Leliaert and colleagues suggested a revised taxonomy of the Viridiplantae. In 2019, M. Leebens-Mack and colleagues proposed a phylogeny based on analysis of over a thousand plant genomes. It renders the former "chlorophyte algae" and "streptophyte algae" paraphyletic, as the land plants arose from within them.

== Definition ==
Viridiplantae (lit. 'green plants') is a clade of around 450,000–500,000 species of chloroplast-bearing eukaryotes. Most of them are autotrophs that obtain their energy by photosynthesis and play important primary production roles in both terrestrial and aquatic ecosystems. The clade includes all green algae, which are primarily aquatic; many are microscopic unicellular phytoplankton. It also includes the macroscopic, multicellular, generally complex-structured land plants (embryophytes, i.e. Plantae sensu strictissimo), which emerged from within the freshwater green algae clade Streptophyta during the Ordivician.

In traditional taxonomy, the classification of green algae typically exclude the land plants, rendering them a paraphyletic group; however it is cladistically accurate to regard land plants as a specialized clade of green algae that had evolved to thrive on dry land, thus making Viridiplantae a monophyletic group. Since the realization that the embryophytes emerged from green algae, some authors are starting to include them.

Viridiplantae species all have cells with cellulose in their cell walls, and primary chloroplasts derived from endosymbiosis with cyanobacteria that contain chlorophylls a and b and lack phycobilins. In some classification systems, the group has been treated as a kingdom under various names such as Viridiplantae, Chlorobionta or simply the kingdom Plantae (sensu stricto), the lattermost expanding upon the traditional grouping of (land) plants to include all green algae closely and distantly related to Embryophyta. Adl et al., who produced a classification for all eukaryotes in 2005, introduced the name Chloroplastida for this group, reflecting the group having primary chloroplasts, and they rejected the name Viridiplantae on the grounds that some of the species are not plants as understood traditionally. Together with Rhodophyta (red algae), Glaucophyta (grey algae) and other basal groups such as the phagotrophic Rhodelphidia and the picoplanktonic Picozoa (both considered sister to red algae), Viridiplantae belong to the larger primary algae clade Archaeplastida.

== Evolution ==
=== Taxonomy ===
Leliaert et al, 2012 propose the following simplified taxonomy of the Viridiplantae.

- Viridiplantae
  - Chlorophyta
    - core chlorophytes
      - Ulvophyceae
        - Cladophorales
        - Dasycladales
        - Bryopsidales
        - Trentepohliales
        - Ulvales-Ulotrichales
        - Oltmannsiellopsidales
      - Chlorophyceae
        - Oedogoniales
        - Chaetophorales
        - Chaetopeltidales
        - Chlamydomonadales
        - Sphaeropleales
      - Trebouxiophyceae
        - Chlorellales
        - Oocystaceae
        - Microthamniales
        - Trebouxiales
        - Prasiola clade
      - Chlorodendrophyceae
        - Chlorodendrales
      - Pedinophyceae
    - prasinophytes (paraphyletic)
      - Pyramimonadales
      - Mamiellophyceae
      - Pycnococcaceae
      - Nephroselmidophyceae
      - Prasinococcales
      - Palmophyllales
  - Streptophyta
    - Charophytes
      - Mesostigmatophyceae
        - Mesostigmatales
        - Chlorokybales
      - Klebsormidiophyceae
      - Phragmoplastophyta
        - Charophyceae
        - Coleochaetophyceae
        - Zygnematophyceae
        - Embryophyta (land plants)

=== Phylogeny ===
In 2019, a phylogeny based on genomes and transcriptomes from 1,153 plant species was proposed. The placing of algal groups is supported by phylogenies based on genomes from the Mesostigmatophyceae and Chlorokybophyceae that have since been sequenced. Both the "chlorophyte algae" and the "streptophyte algae" are treated as paraphyletic (vertical bars beside phylogenetic tree diagram) in this analysis. The classification of Bryophyta is supported both by Puttick et al. 2018, and by phylogenies involving the hornwort genomes that have also since been sequenced.

- Archaeplastida
  - Rhodophyta
  - - Glaucophyta
    - Viridiplantae (green plants)
      - Prasinodermophyta
      - - Chlorophyta
        - - - Mesostigmatophyceae
            - - Chlorokybophyceae
              - Spirotaenia
          - - Klebsormidiales
            - - Chara
              - - Coleochaetales
                - - Zygnematophyceae
                  - Embryophytes (land plants)
                    - - Bryophytes
                        - Hornworts
                        - - Liverworts
                          - Mosses
                    - - Lycophytes
                      - - Ferns
                        - Spermatophytes (seed plants)
                          - Gymnosperms
                          - Angiosperms

Ancestrally, the green algae were flagellates.
