= Chuanlinggou Formation =

Geologic formation in China

- Stratigraphic range: 1641.7 ± 1.2 Ma
- Type: Formation
- Underlies: Tuanshanzi Formation
- Overlies: Changzhougou Formation

Location
- Country: China

The Chuanlinggou Formation is a geologic formation in China. It preserves fossils dating back to the Statherian period of the Paleoproterozoic. It is the first formation to preserve definitive macroscopic eukaryotes, at 1.64 billion years old.

== Paleobiota ==
After Miao et al, 2024, Liu et al, 2023 and Zhongying 1986

Color key: Taxon / Reclassified taxon / Taxon falsely reported as present / Dubious taxon or junior synonym / Ichnotaxon / Ootaxon / Morphotaxon

Notes
Uncertain or tentative taxa are in small text
~~crossed out~~ taxa are discredited.

=== Paleobiota ===
Paleobiota
Genus	Species	Notes	Images
Qingshania	Q. magnifica	Enigmatic filamentous eukaryote	
Tuanshanzia	T. sp	Enigmatic frond-like organism; possibly within Archaeplastida	A restoration of Tuanshanzia fasciaria
Changchengia	C. sp	Enigmatic frond-like organism, possibly within Archaeplastida	A restoration of Changchengia sp.
Glossophyton	G. ovalis; G. sp	Enigmatic fossil, possibly an alga	
Chuaria	C. circularis	Enigmatic fossil, possibly synonymous with Tawuia	Specimen from China
Tawuia	T. sinensis; T. robusta	Enigmatic fossil, possibly an alga	A restoration of Tawuia sinensis
Siphonophycus	S. sp	Filamentous fossil	Line drawing reconstruction of Siphonophycus attenuatum
Eomycetopsis	E. sp	Filamentous fossil	
Archaeotrichion	A. sp	Filamentous fossil	
Leiosphaeridia	L. sp	Acritarch	
Kildinosphaera	K. sp	Acritarch	
