= Cyanophora sudae =

Scientific classification
- Domain: Eukaryota
- Clade: Archaeplastida
- Division: Glaucophyta
- Class: Glaucophyceae
- Order: Glaucocystales
- Family: Glaucocystaceae
- Genus: Cyanophora
- Species: C. sudae

Binomial name
- Cyanophora sudae Tos.Takah. & Nozaki 2014

Species of algae

Cyanophora sudae is a species of algae classified as a glaucophyte. It was first described as a distinct species in 2014, identified from a strain collected in Ibaraki, Japan. It was named after the collector of the first strain, Dr. Soichiro Suda of University of the Ryukyus.

== Morphology ==
Cyanophora sudae cells have been described as being broad and bean-shaped, with sizes ranging from 9-12 μm in length and 4-9 μm in width. Cells have anywhere between 2-8 plastids, although they generally have four. Honeycomb-shaped patterns have been observed on the surface of C. sudae cells when viewed via SEM microscopy.

== Phylogeny ==
Within Cyanophora, C. sudae is considered to be most closely related to Cyanophora biloba, on the basis of the similarity of plastid and mitochondrial DNA.
