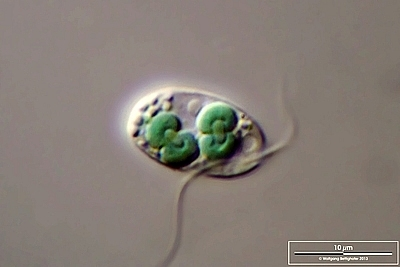
- C. paradoxa showing cyanelles in binary fission, nucleus and flagella. Scale bar, 10 µm.

Scientific classification
- Clade: Archaeplastida
- Division: Glaucophyta
- Class: Glaucophyceae
- Order: Glaucocystales
- Family: Glaucocystaceae
- Genus: Cyanophora
- Species: C. paradoxa

Binomial name
- Cyanophora paradoxa Korshikov, 1924

= Cyanophora paradoxa =

Species of alga

Cyanophora paradoxa is a freshwater species of Glaucophyte that is used as a model organism. C. paradoxa has two cyanelles or chloroplasts where photosynthesis occurs. Cyanelles are unusual organelles in that they retain a rudimentary peptidoglycan wall. The cyanelle genome of C. paradoxa strain LB 555 was sequenced and published in 1995. The nuclear genome was also sequenced and published in 2012.

== Description ==
Cyanophora paradoxa is a unicellular organism with two flagella, attached near the tip of the cell. The cell body is about 7-15 μm long by 3-6 μm wide; it is roughly ovoid (egg-shaped) in shape, and is covered in ridges that outline triangular or crescent-shaped "fenestrations". Each cell generally has one or two cyanelles.
