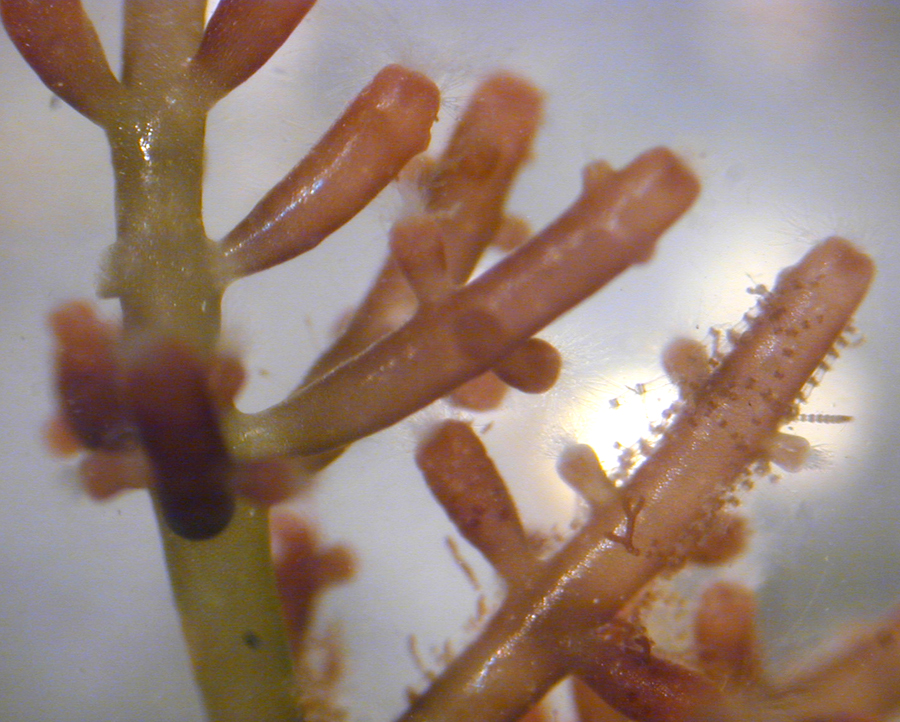
- Close-up of a red alga (Laurencia sp.), a marine seaweed from Hawaii.

Scientific classification (obsolete as polyphyletic)
- Kingdom: Plantae
- Subkingdom: Biliphyta; Cavalier-Smith, 1981

Phyla
- Glaucophyta Skuja, 1948; Rhodophyta Wettstein, 1901

= Biliphyta =

Group of algae

Biliphyta is an obsolete polyphyletic subkingdom of algae.

It includes Glaucophyta and Rhodophyta.

Members of this group should not be confused with Picozoa, which is also called Picobiliphytes, which are also known as "biliphytes".
