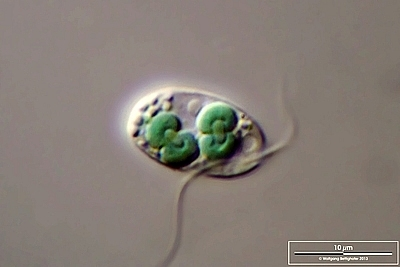
- Cyanophora paradoxa

Scientific classification
- Domain: Eukaryota
- Clade: Archaeplastida
- Division: Glaucophyta
- Class: Glaucophyceae
- Order: Glaucocystales
- Family: Glaucocystaceae
- Genus: Cyanophora; Korshikov

Type species
- Cyanophora paradoxa Korshikov

= Cyanophora =

Genus of algae

Cyanophora is a genus of glaucophytes, a group of rare but evolutionarily significant freshwater microalgae.

It includes the following species:

- Cyanophora biloba
- Cyanophora cuspidata
- Cyanophora kugrensii
- Cyanophora paradoxa
- Cyanophora sudae
- Cyanophora tetracyanea

A recent study by Takahashi et al. (2023) used both morphological and molecular data to distinguish five distinct species within the genus Cyanophora, confirming species boundaries and supporting the utility of combined phylogenetic analysis. These species are differentiated based on cell shape, number and position of cyanelles, and molecular data.

The species Cyanophora paradoxa is well-studied as a model organism.
