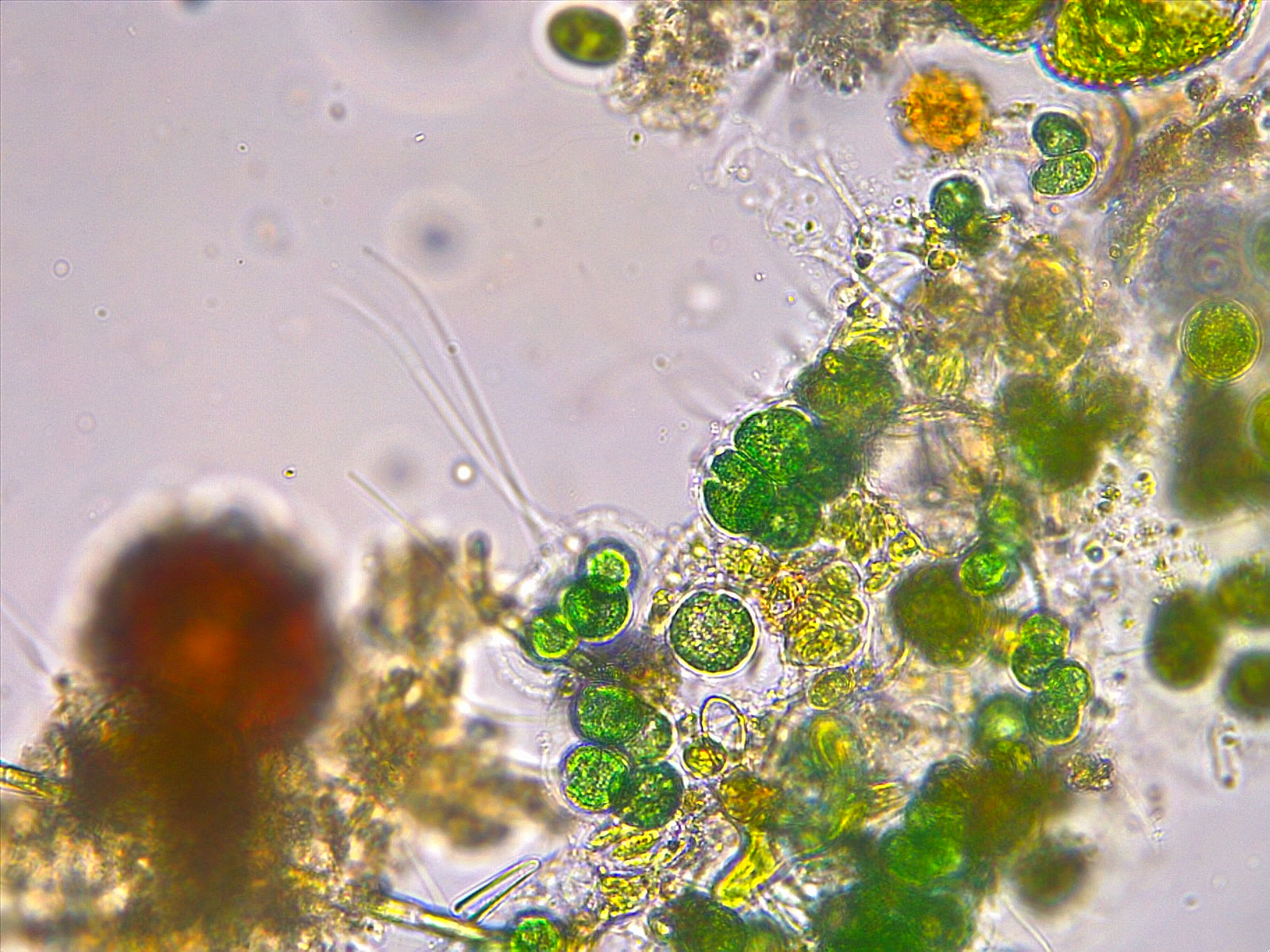

Scientific classification
- Domain: Eukaryota
- Clade: Archaeplastida
- Division: Glaucophyta
- Class: Glaucophyceae
- Order: Gloeochaetales
- Family: Gloeochaetaceae
- Genus: Gloeochaete; Lagerheim
- Species: G. wittrockiana

Binomial name
- Gloeochaete wittrockiana Lagerheim

= Gloeochaete =

Gloeochaete is a rare genus of algae, containing the sole species Gloeochaete wittrockiana. It is found in freshwater habitats, where it grows attached to other algae and aquatic plants. It has a cosmopolitan distribution.

== Taxonomy ==
The genus Gloeochaete was described in 1883 by Gustaf Lagerheim, growing on various Oedogonium in Uppsala, Sweden. The name derives from the Greek gloia ("glue") and chaitê ("hair").

At first, Lagerheim placed the genus was placed in the cyanobacteria family Chroococcaceae, based on its similarity to cyanobacterial genera such as Chroococcus and Gloeocapsa. Later, it was placed in the family Tetrasporaceae, under the guise that it was a colorless Tetraspora-like organism with an endosymbiotic cyanobacteria-like organism. Currently, Gloeochaete is considered part of the glaucophyte algae (Glaucophyta), a small but evolutionarily significant group of algae. Together with land plants, green algae, and red algae, they form the clade Archaeplastida, and are important to studying its evolutionary history.

== Description ==
Gloeochaete wittrockiana grows attached to aquatic algae and plants, such as Sphagnum. It consists of single cells or colonies of two, four or eight cells, which are embedded in a layer of mucilage. Each cell has one or two long, gelatinous hairs (variously termed pseudocilia or setae). Within each cell, there are a number of sausage-shaped blue-green plastids (also known as cyanelles).

== Genome ==
The plastid DNA of Gloeochaete wittrockiana consists of a simple circular loop that is 143,343 base pairs long. It is relatively conserved with respect to other glaucophyte plastids. Similarly, the mitochondrial DNA of G. wittrockiana is highly conserved and is 36,046 base pairs long.
