= Rhodaria =

Rhodaria may refer to:

- Rhodaria (protist), a clade of eukaryotes including picozoans, rhodelphids and red algae
- Rhodaria (moth), a genus of insects
