= Cyanophora cuspidata =

Scientific classification
- Domain: Eukaryota
- Clade: Archaeplastida
- Division: Glaucophyta
- Class: Glaucophyceae
- Order: Glaucocystales
- Family: Glaucocystaceae
- Genus: Cyanophora
- Species: C. cuspidata

Binomial name
- Cyanophora cuspidata Tos.Takah. & Nozaki 2014

Species of alga

Cyanophora cuspidata is a species of algae classified as a glaucophyte. It was first identified as a distinct species in 2014, from a strain isolated from Erlangen, Germany in 1967.

== Morphology ==
Cells of C. cuspidata have been reported to be "obovoid to ellipsoidal" in shape, with sizes ranging from 5-12 μm in length and 2-5 μm in width. A distinct tapered "tail" has been reported at the tips of cells, which is unique among Cyanophora. Cells have only 1-2 plastids. As with other Cyanophora species, no cell wall is present.

== Use as a model organism ==
Cyanophora is notable as the only glaucophyte taxon known to possess a flagellum for the entirety of its life cycle. The flagella of C. cuspidata has been studied as a method to more accurately place glaucophytes within eukaryote phylogeny.
