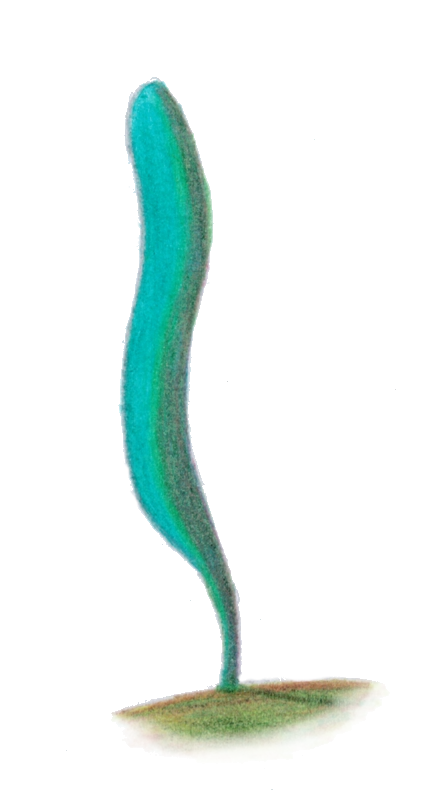
- Reconstruction of Changchengia stipitata

Scientific classification
- Domain: Eukaryota
- (unranked): incertae sedis
- Genus: †Changchengia; Yan & Liu, 1997
- Species: †C. stipitata

Binomial name
- †Changchengia stipitata Yan and Liu, 1997

= Changchengia =

Changchengia Temporal range: Statherian–Calymmian

Genus of enigmatic fossil organism

Changchengia is a genus of possible alga from the early-mid Proterozoic. It contains one species, Changchengia stipitata. This genus is known from various formations, such as the Olive Shales of the Vindhya Range and the Saraipali Formation in India, alongside the Chuanlinggou Formation of China.

== Description ==
Reconstructions of three different forms of Changchengia sp.

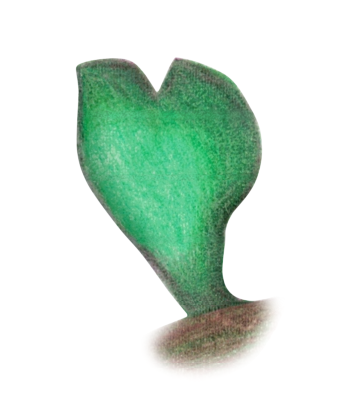

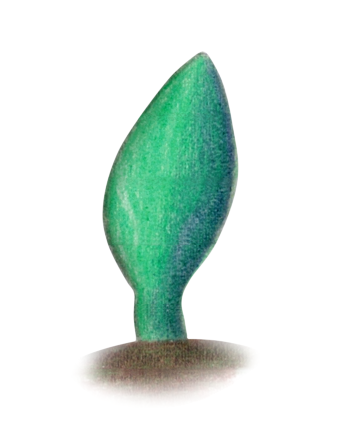

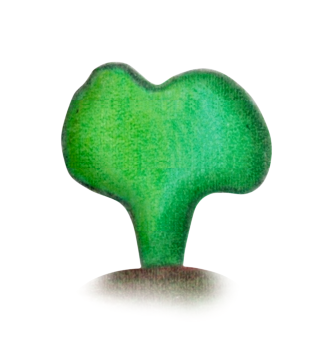

Changchengia is between 0.7 and 40 mm (0.03 and 1.57 in) long and between 0.5 to 4 mm (0.02 to 0.16 in) wide, with a thin blade-like thallus. In C. stipitata the thallus is usually ribbon-shaped or lanceolate with folded and lamellose margins, with the widest point in the middle and tapering towards the base and tip. However, fossils from the Chuanlinggou Formation are more ovoid or obcordate in shape, alongside tapering holdfasts. The base is obtuse and contacts with a long and linear parastem, which itself connects to a holdfast. This genus shares many morphological similarities with Tuanshanzia, and in fact it was classified within this genus at first. However, a conspicuous difference between the two is that Tuanshanzia has no parastem, and instead its thallus slowly narrows towards the holdfast.
