= Capsulan =

Capsulan is the exopolysaccharide which makes up the thick capsule surrounding the unicellular alga Prasinococcus capsulatus.

== Extraction ==
Capsulan is extracted from cell cultures of P. capsulatus using the French press method to burst the cells. Alternatively the cells may be boiled.

== Composition ==
Capsulan has been found to be mostly carbohydrate (70%) with some protein and sulfur. The main sugars making up the carbohydrate are galactose and glucose while other sugars such as xylose, arabinose and mannose are also present in smaller quantities. Sugar acids are common in plant and algal polysaccharide but there is disagreement in the literature concerning capsulan's sugar acid content. Kurano claims that capsulan contains none, while Myklestad maintains that both galacturonic and glucuronic acids are present.
