= Prasinococcus =

Scientific classification
- Clade: Viridiplantae
- Phylum: Prasinodermophyta
- Class: Palmophyllophyceae
- Order: Prasinococcales
- Family: Prasinococcaceae
- Genus: Prasinococcus; Miyashita & Chihara 1993
- Species: P. capsulatus

Binomial name
- Prasinococcus capsulatus Miyashita & Chihara 1993

Genus of algae

Prasinococcus is a monotypic genus of green algae, containing the only species Prasinococcus capsulatus, in the monotypic family Prasinococcaceae. This unicellular algal species was discovered in 1990 in the West Pacific Ocean and has characteristic reproduction methods as well as an interesting and potentially exploitable morphology. This is the only species in the genus, though various strains exist, for example URI 266G is the Atlantic clone.

== Discovery ==
Prasinococcus capsulatus, the only currently known member of this genus, was discovered in the West Pacific Ocean during a cruise by the research vessel Sohgen-maru in November–December 1990. The name "'capsulatus'" coming from the alga's large capsule which surrounds the cell.

== Morphology ==
Prasinococcus have a firm cell wall lacking scales and also lack flagella. The mitochondrial lobe and chloroplast outer membrane both protrude into the pyrenoid matrix which is considered characteristic of the genus. The cell wall has a protruding circular collar which is surrounded by holes which penetrate the cell wall. Its method of asexual reproduction is also considered characteristic - after cell division one daughter cell remains within the original cell wall while the other is extruded.

The most notable feature of P. capsulatus morphology is its large capsule composed of an exo-polysaccharide which has been dubbed "capsulan". Capsulan is thought to be synthesised in the Golgi and then secreted through the decapore (a specialised circle of 10 pores through the cell wall). After exiting the decapore capsulan becomes visible and it is thought that it cross links with divalent ions in the seawater. Research is currently underway to find potential applications for capsulan and how to maximise its production.

The capsule's function is not clearly defined but various explanations have been suggested. One is that it offers protection to newly divided cells which lack a thick cell wall, another is that it provides a template for daughter cells to synthesise their new cell wall. The capsule may also interfere with filter feeding, thus reducing predation. In similar species, capsules have been noted for their antibacterial properties and a conspicuous lack of bacteria as well as viral particles in impure samples of P. capsulatus has been observed.

The pigments of Prasinococcus include chlorophylls a and b, prasinoxanthin, Mg 2, 4-diviriylphaeoporphyrin a5 monomethyl ester (Mg 2, 4-D) and 5, 6-epoxy-3, 3′-dihydroxy-5, 6, 7′, 8′-tetrahydro-β-ε-caroten-11′ and 19-olide (uriolide).

== Reproduction ==
Sexual reproduction has not been observed in P. capsulatus but its mode of asexual reproduction is quite distinctive. The cell splits into two daughter cells while remaining inside the original cell wall, one daughter cell then begins to enlarge, while the other is pushed out of a small hole in the parental cell wall. The larger cell remains in the original cell wall while the other migrates to the edge of the capsule which surrounds them both. Before leaving the parental capsule this daughter has synthesised its own firm cell wall after which it leaves the parental capsule and begins to produce its own capsule.

Others claim that this mode of reproduction immature cells with thinner walls older cells with thicker walls must first discard the paternal cell wall before undergoing binary fission and then each daughter cell produces its own new cell wall. This is evidenced by abandoned cell walls residing in mature cells' capsules.

== Distribution ==
P. capsulatus is an important contributor to oceanic biomass especially in late winter to early spring. Its range covers much of the West Pacific and West Atlantic Oceans.

== Bio-remediation ==
P. capsulatus is currently being studied for use in Carbon Dioxide capture, especially important as it recycles this carbon into capsulan which may be a useful compound.
