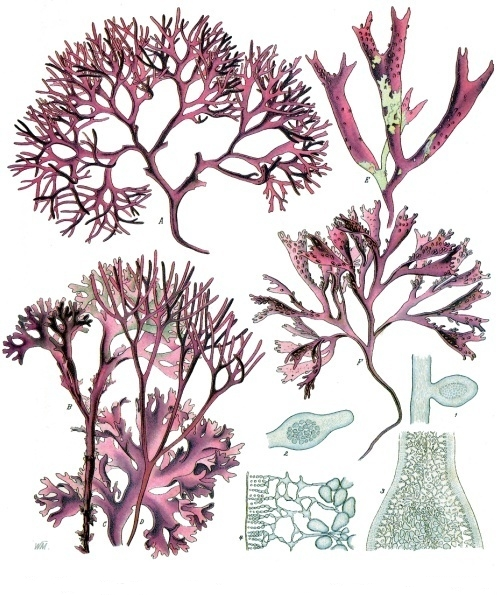
- Rhodophyta

Scientific classification
- Domain: Eukaryota
- Clade: Archaeplastida
- Clade: Rhodaria; Cavalier-Smith 2022

Phyla
- Pararhoda?; Picozoa; Rhodelphidia; Rhodophyta

= Rhodaria (protist) =

Clade of archaeplastids

Rhodaria is a clade of archaeplastids. It includes picozoans, rhodelphids and red algae.
