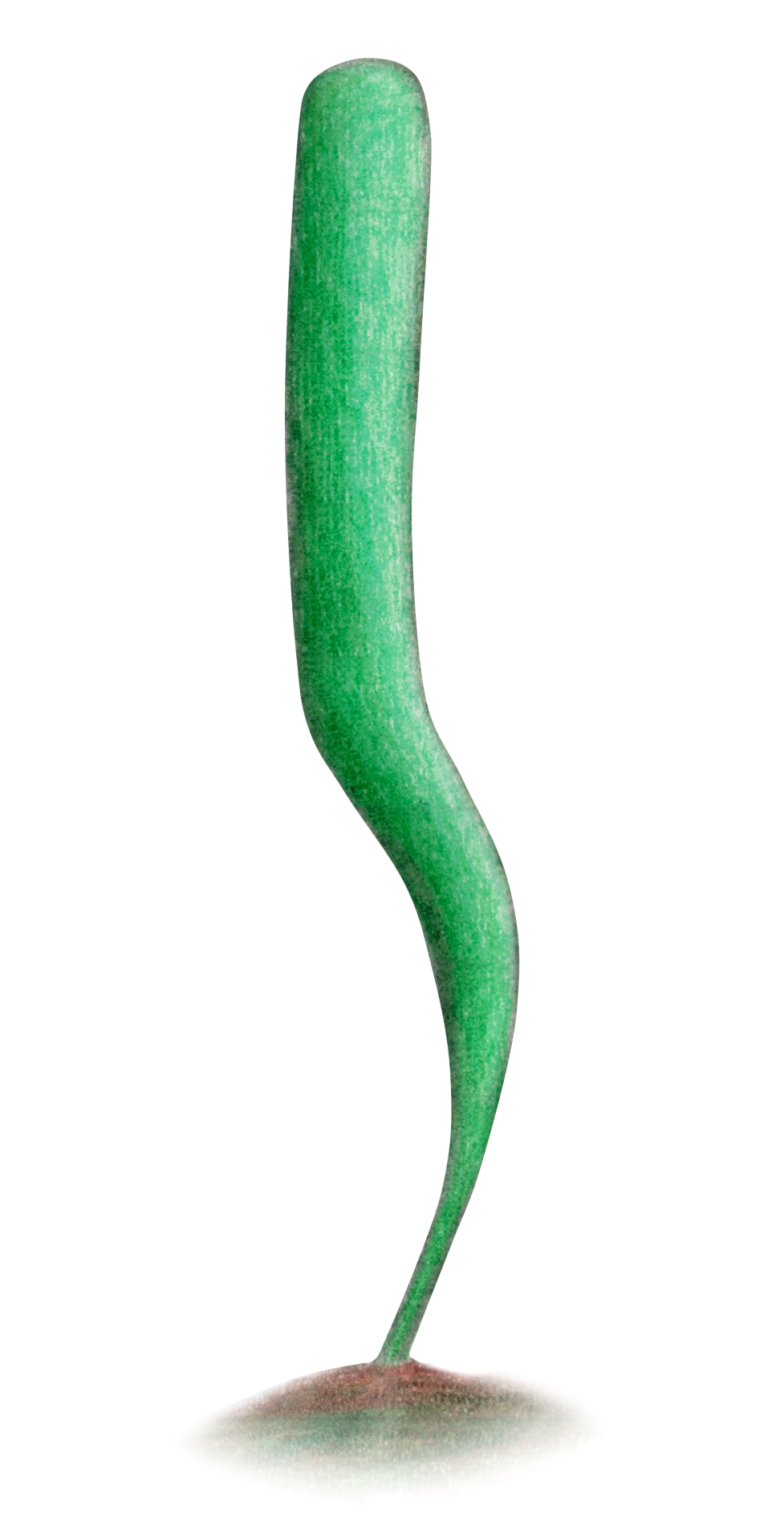
- Tuanshanzia linearis

Scientific classification
- Domain: Eukaryota
- Kingdom: incertae sedis
- Genus: †Tuanshanzia; Yan, 1995

Type species
- Tuanshanzia lanceolata Yan, 1995

Species
- Tuanshanzia fasciaria Yan and Liu, 1997; Tuanshanzia lanceolata Yan, 1995; Tuanshanzia linearis Chen et al., 2023; Tuanshanzia parva Chen et al., 2023; Tuanshanzia platyphylla Yan and Liu, 1997

= Tuanshanzia =

Tuanshanzia Temporal range: Statherian–Calymmian

Genus of Proterozoic alga

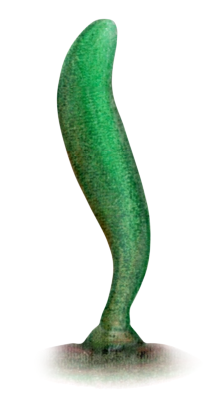
A restoration of Tuanshanzia fasciaria

Tuanshanzia is a genus of Proterozoic eukaryote, known from several locations across China and India, including the Gaoyuzhuang and Chuanlinggou formations, the eponymous Tuanshanzi Formation, as well as the Vindhya Basin. It is probably an alga, although its exact classification is currently unclear. Tuanshanzia seems to be part of a wider group of elongate Proterozoic algae, alongside Changchengia and Eopalmaria.

== Description ==
Tuanshanzia specimens range from 4 to 30 cm (1.6 to 11.8 in) long, and are often preserved as carbonaceous films with a wide range of shapes, varying by species. The type, T. lanceolata has a lanceolate shape, whereas other species have shapes ranging from oval to elongated. As a form taxon, Tuanshanzia is likely paraphyletic, although as no practical alternative exists it remains a valid genus. The genus is named after the Tuanshanzi Formation, where it was first discovered, while the various species are named after their morphology. Many of the specimens from the Tuanshanzi Formation are likely microbial mat fragments due to their rough edges and irregularity, however some are likely actual algae due to smooth and regular margins, alongside carbon isotope analysis showing similarities to eukaryotes.
