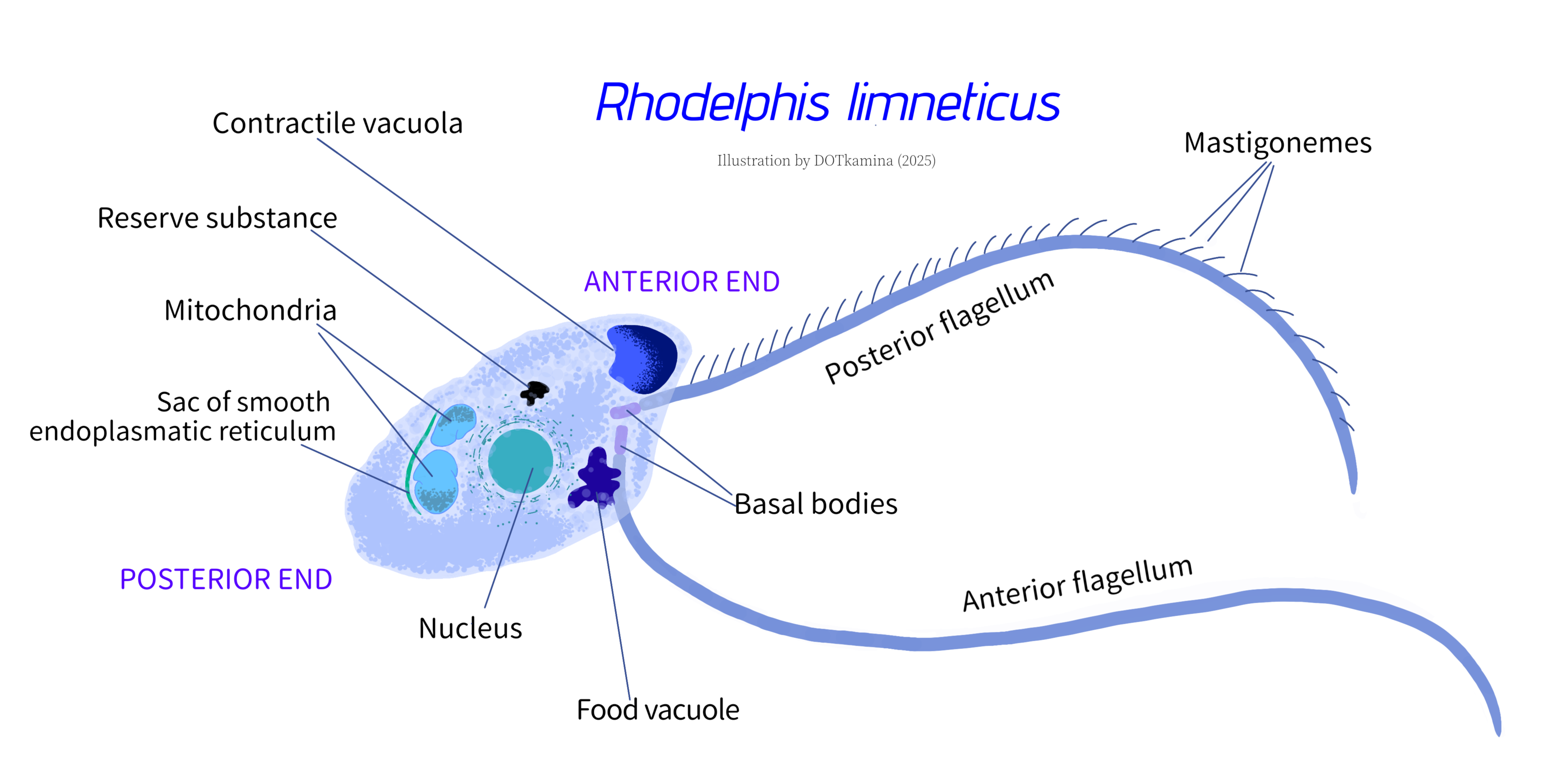
- Diagram of Rhodelphis limneticus

Scientific classification
- Domain: Eukaryota
- Clade: Archaeplastida
- Clade?: Pararhoda
- Phylum: Rhodelphidia; Tikhonenkov, Gawryluk, Mylnikov & Keeling 2019
- Class: Rhodelphea; Tikhonenkov, Gawryluk, Mylnikov & Keeling in Gawryluk et al. 2019
- Order: Rhodelphida; Tikhonenkov, Gawryluk, Mylnikov & Keeling in Gawryluk et al. 2019
- Family: Rhodelphidae; Tikhonenkov, Gawryluk, Mylnikov & Keeling in Gawryluk et al. 2019
- Genus: Rhodelphis; Tikhonenkov, Gawryluk, Mylnikov & Keeling in Gawryluk et al. 2019

Species
- R. limneticus; R. marinus; R. mylnikovi; R. edaphicus

= Rhodelphis =

Genus of unicellular archaeplastids

Rhodelphis is a single-celled archaeplastid that lives in aquatic environments and is the sister group to red algae and possibly Picozoa. While red algae have no flagellated stages and are generally photoautotrophic, Rhodelphis is a flagellated predator containing a non-photosynthetic plastid. This group is important to the understanding of plastid evolution because they provide insight into the morphology and biochemistry of early archaeplastids. Rhodelphis contains a remnant plastid that is not capable of photosynthesis, but may play a role in biochemical pathways in the cell like heme synthesis and iron-sulfur clustering. The plastid does not have a genome, but genes are targeted to it from the nucleus. Rhodelphis is ovoid with a tapered anterior end bearing two perpendicularly-oriented flagella.

== Taxonomy ==
=== History and location ===
Rhodelphis was described in 2019 by Ryan M. R. Gawryluk and coauthors, through a paper published in Nature. The genus was created for two different cultures of protists isolated in previous years. Rhodelphis marinus was first collected in 2015 from marine coral sand in Island Bay Canh, Con Dao, Vietnam. Rhodelphis limneticus was first collected in 2016 from a freshwater lake in Chernigovskaya oblast, Ukraine. A third species was described in 2023, Rhodelphis mylnikovi, isolated from a freshwater pond near Montigny-le-Bretonneux, France.

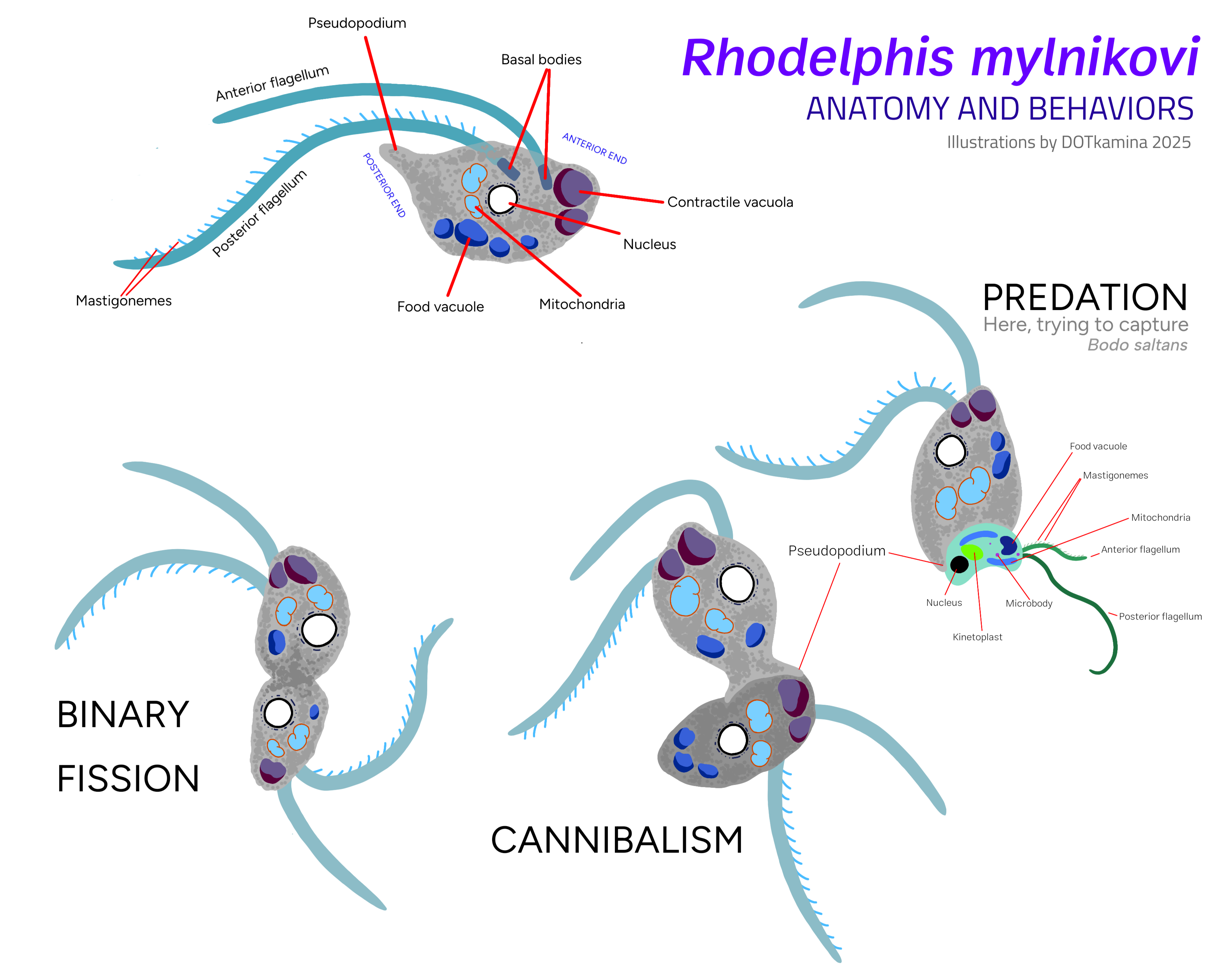
Cellular anatomy and behaviors of Rhodelphis mylnikovi.

=== Species ===
To date, 4 species of Rhodelphis have been described.

- Rhodelphis edaphicus Belyaev, Zagumyonnyi, Gerasimova, Sozonov & Tikhonenkov, 2025
- Rhodelphis limneticus Tikhonenkov, Gawryluk, Mylnikov & Keeling, 2019
- Rhodelphis marinus Tikhonenkov, Gawryluk, Mylnikov & Keeling, 2019
- Rhodelphis mylnikovi Prokina, Tikhonenkov, López-García & Moreira, 2023

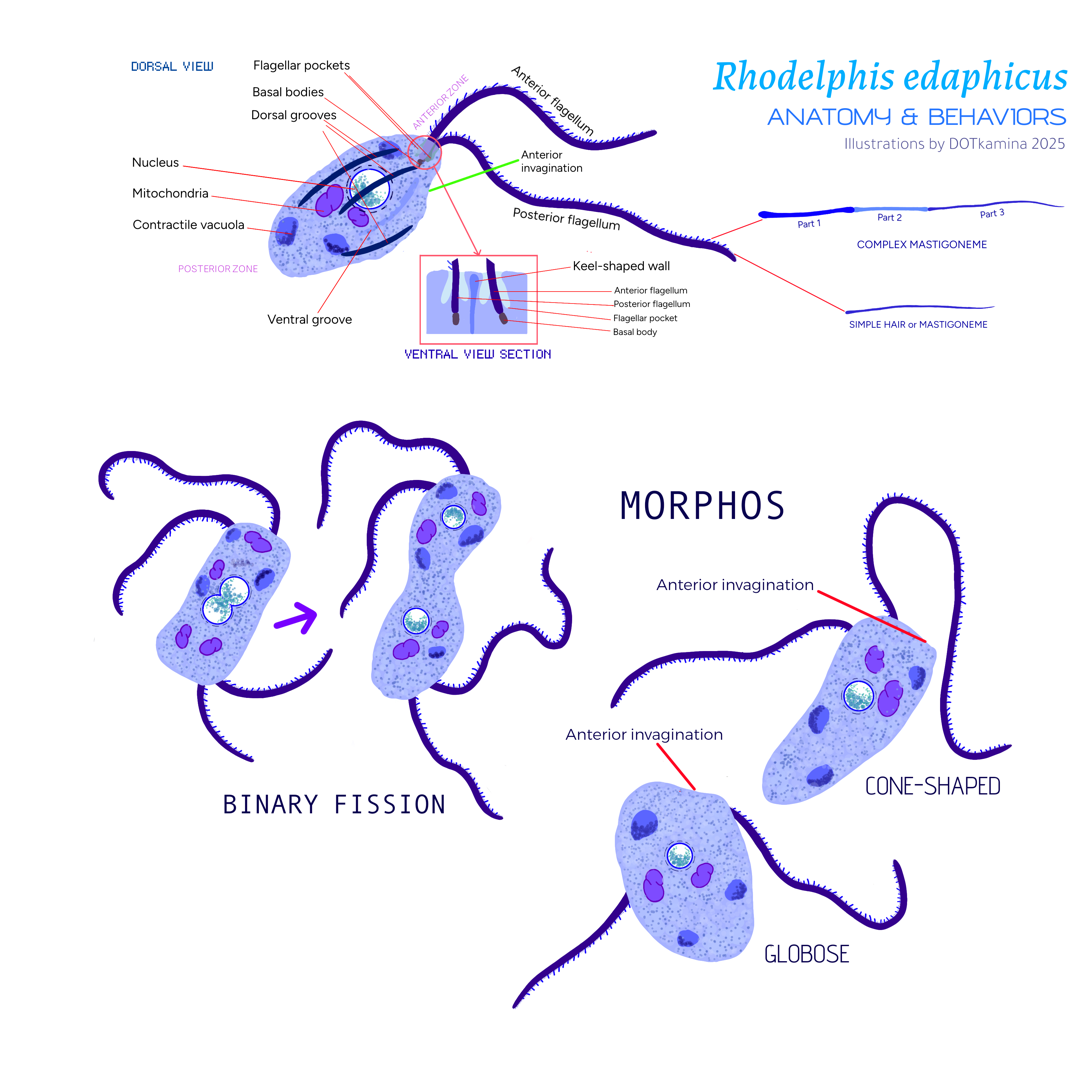
Cellular anatomy and behaviors of Rhodelphis edaphicus.

== Ecology ==
Rhodelphis are heterotrophic predators that feed on bacteria and smaller eukaryotic flagellates, but little is known about its role in aquatic ecosystems. The three known Rhodelphis species were isolated from very different aquatic habitats, one of them from shallow marine water (R. marinus) and two from freshwater (R. limneticus and R. mylnikovi).

== Description ==
=== Morphology ===
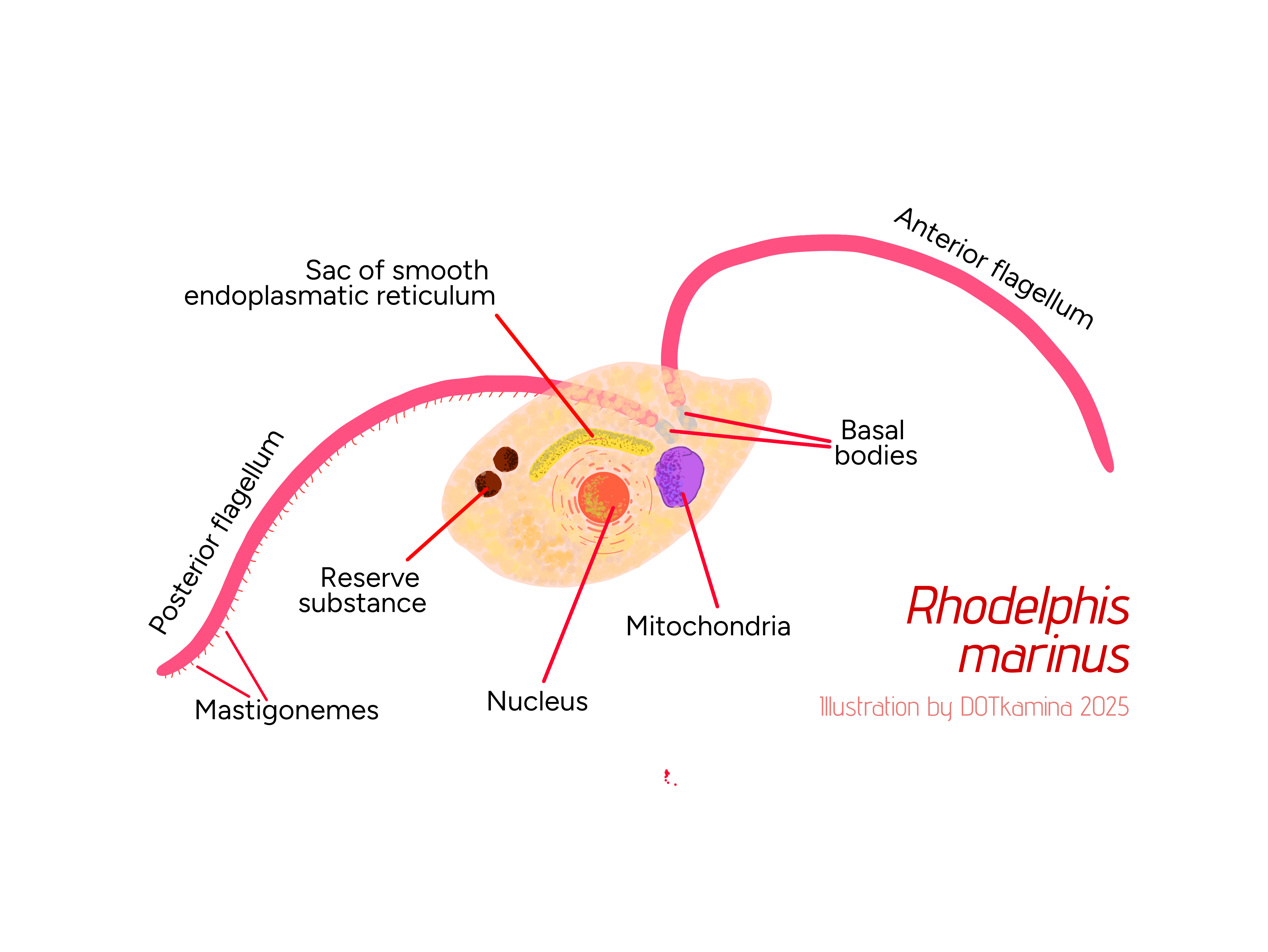
Cell anatomy of Rhodelphis marinus.

Rhodelphis is an ovoid unicellular organism with a diameter of 10-13 μm. The cells do not contain any pigments, so they appear mostly clear under a microscope and are covered in umbrella-shaped glycostyles. The cells are motile and can swim around using their two flagella. Originating just below the anterior end of the cell, the flagella are perpendicular to one another and are of approximately equal length. The posteriorly oriented flagellum is covered in hair-like mastigonemes. No ostensible feeding apparatus is present, but phagocytosis of prey takes place at the posterior end.

Although it has not been identified using microscopy, evidence of plastid import proteins has revealed Rhodelphis' non-photosynthetic remnant plastid. The plastid has retained some function in iron-sulfur cluster assembly and heme biosynthesis, but it does not synthesize fatty acids or isoprenoids—Rhodelphis uses different pathways in the cytosol for this. Rhodelphis also contains mitochondria with tubular cristae that possess an iron-sulfur cluster biosynthesis pathway and play a part in heme biosynthesis.

=== Genetics ===
Rhodelphis is the sister group to the red algae, but the two groups differ substantially in their genetic makeup. Rhodelphis' genome is far larger than red algal genomes and its genes contain far more introns. In addition, genomic analyses revealed that Rhodelphis contains many sequences that are absent in red algae, such as those that encode flagellar proteins and components required for phagocytosis.

The common ancestor of red algae and Rhodelphis resulted from a primary endosymbiotic event early in the evolution of archaeplastids. Rhodelphis was found to contain plastid-targeted proteins as well as homologs to protein-transporters found in chloroplasts. The genes that were targeted to the plastids matched those found in red algae. Despite the targeting of proteins from the nucleus to the plastid, Rhodelphis contains only two proteins that could be involved in photosynthesis, and it seems that the plastid genome has been completely lost.

== Importance ==
Rhodelphis is part of the archaeplastids, a group that shares a common ancestor that was able to obtain a primary plastid. Since there are few intermediates of primary endosymbiotic events, the discovery of Rhodelphis may be able to provide insight into the type of organisms that may have taken up plastids in the first place, the ancestors to all archaeplastids. Additionally, it shows some of the steps that were taken early on in plastid evolution such as protein targeting and a transition from phagotrophy to mixotrophy. These discoveries are important to understanding the evolution of green algae, plants and red algae, which are integral primary producers across the globe.
