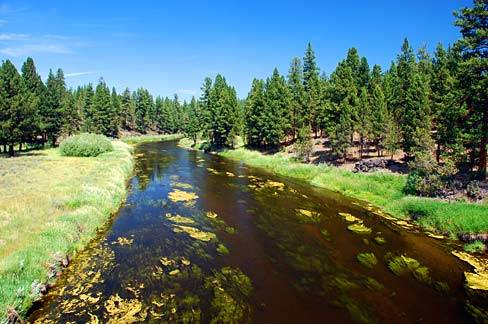
- Conifer trees, grasses, algae, and shrubs in and around Sprague River, Oregon

Scientific classification
- Domain: Eukaryota
- Clade: Diaphoretickes
- Clade: CAM
- Supergroup: Archaeplastida; Adl et al. 2005

Subgroups
- Rhodaria; Picozoa; Rhodelphidia; Rhodophyta; Glaucophyta; Viridiplantae (green plants)

Synonyms
- Plantae Cavalier-Smith 1981; Primoplastobiota Reviers 2002; Primoplantae Palmer et al. 2004

= Archaeplastida =

Archaeplastida Temporal range: Calymmian – Present

Clade of eukaryotes containing land plants and some algae

Archaeplastida (pronounced /ɑːrkɪˈplæstɪdə/) or archaeplastids, sometimes also regarded as the kingdom Plantae sensu lato ("plants in a broad sense"), are a large group of eukaryotes comprising the major clades Viridiplantae (green algae and land plants) and Rhodophyta (red algae), as well as the minor basal division Glaucophyta ("grey algae"). While the vast majority of archaeplastids are photosynthetic autotrophs, the group also includes heterotrophic lineages such as the predatorial (eukaryotrophic) flagellates Rhodelphidia, and probably also the microscopic picoplankton Picozoa, both may be sister to Rhodophyta and altogether forming the larger solid clade Rhodaria.

With the exception of the picozoans, archaeplastids are all primary algae whose cells have pigment-bearing membrane-bound organelles called plastids, and most of their plastids contain the red/blue light-sensitive photopigment chlorophyll, which acts as the core component of photosynthetic reaction centers that split water for carbon fixation and release dioxygen as a chemical byproduct. These chlorophyll-bearing plastids — known as chloroplasts — are surrounded by two biological membranes, suggesting that they were endosymbionts evolved directly from phagocytosis of β-cyanobacteria, which did not result in intracellular digestion but instead achieved mutualistic symbiosis within the endomembrane system. In contrast, other photosynthetic algae, besides the amoeboid rhizarian genus Paulinella (which also directly obtained cyanobionts via endosymbiosis of α-cyanobacteria, but independently and much later), are secondary algae with chloroplasts surrounded by three or four membranes, suggesting they were indirectly acquired via phagocytosis and subsequent endosymbiosis of archaeplastids (red or green algae) or other secondary algae, (Note: The exceptional two plastid membranes of the stramenopile alga Chrysoparadoxa are probably the result of secondary reduction.) in what can be considered a form of permanent kleptoplasty. Unlike red and green algae, glaucophytes are not known to be ever involved in such secondary endosymbiosis events.

Archaeplastid cells typically lack centrioles and have mitochondria with flat cristae. They usually have a cell wall that contains cellulose, and photosynthesized carbohydrates are stored intracellularly in the form of starch, but these characteristics are also shared with other eukaryotes. Different archaeplastid clades differ slightly in cellular biochemistry. Red algae are pigmented with chlorophyll a and phycobiliproteins (especially phycoerythrin, which gives the reddish color) like most cyanobacteria, and accumulate starch in the cytosol outside the chloroplasts. Green algae, land plants (embryophytes) and the minor basal group Prasinodermophyta – together known as Viridiplantae (Latin for "green plants") or Chloroplastida – are pigmented with both chlorophyll a and chlorophyll b, but lack phycobiliproteins (thus presenting an untainted green color), and starch is accumulated directly inside the chloroplasts or in specialized non-pigmented plastids known as amyloplasts. Glaucophytes have typical cyanobacterial pigments like those of red algae, but their plastids (called cyanelles) differ in having a primitive peptidoglycan outer layer, and they display a blue-grey hue due to phycobiliproteins such as phycocyanin and allophycocyanin.

The main evidence that archaeplastids form a monophyletic group comes from genetic studies, which indicate their plastids likely had a single origin. This evidence is however disputed, and based on the evidence to date, it is not possible to definitively confirm or refute alternative evolutionary scenarios to a single primary endosymbiosis event. Photosynthetic organisms with plastids of indirect origin (such as brown algae, euglenids, diatoms and dinoflagellates) do not belong to Archaeplastida and are instead grouped into numerous other protist classifications, making the term "algae" a rather vague polyphyletic group.

Archaeplastida should not be confused with the older and obsolete name Archiplastideae, which refers to cyanobacteria and other groups of bacteria.

== Taxonomy ==
Various names have been given to the group. Some authors have simply referred to the group as plants or Plantae. However, the name Plantae is ambiguous, since it has also been applied to less inclusive clades, such as Viridiplantae and embryophytes. To distinguish, the larger group is sometimes known as Plantae sensu lato ("plants in the broad sense").

To avoid ambiguity, other names have been proposed. Primoplantae, which appeared in 2004, seems to be the first new name suggested for this group. Another name applied to this node is Plastida, defined as the clade sharing "plastids of primary (direct prokaryote) origin [as] in Magnolia virginiana Linnaeus 1753".

The name Archaeplastida was proposed in 2005 by a large international group of authors (Adl et al.), who aimed to produce a classification for the eukaryotes which took into account morphology, biochemistry, and phylogenetics, and which had "some stability in the near term." They rejected the use of formal taxonomic ranks in favour of a hierarchical arrangement where the clade names do not signify rank. Thus, the phylum name 'Glaucophyta' and the class name 'Rhodophyceae' appear at the same level in their classification. The divisions proposed for the Archaeplastida are shown below in both tabular and diagrammatic form.

The consensus in 2005, when the group consisting of the glaucophytes and red and green algae and land plants was named 'Archaeplastida', was that it was a clade, i.e. was monophyletic. Many studies published since then have provided evidence in agreement. Other studies, though, have suggested that the group is paraphyletic. To date, the situation appears unresolved, but a strong signal for Plantae (Archaeplastida) monophyly has been demonstrated in a recent study (with an enrichment of red algal genes). The assumption made here is that Archaeplastida is a valid clade.

Archaeplastida:

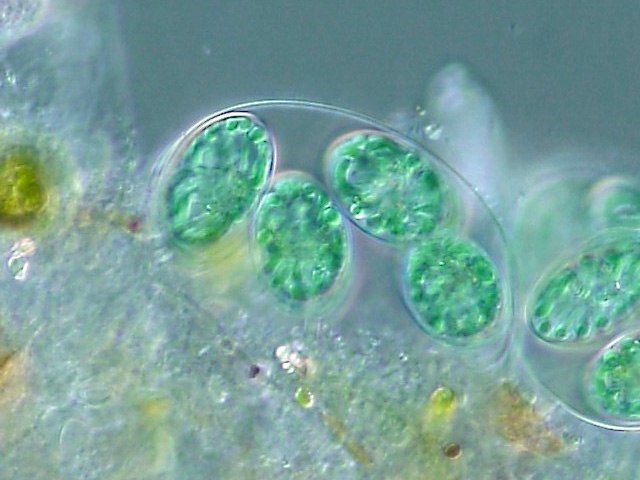
The glaucophyte Glaucocystis

- Glaucophyta Skuja, 1954 (Glaucocystophyta Kies & Kremer, 1986) – glaucophytes

- Glaucophytes are a small group of freshwater single-celled algae. Their plastids, called cyanelles, have a peptidoglycan layer, making them more similar to cyanobacteria than those of the remaining Archaeplastida.

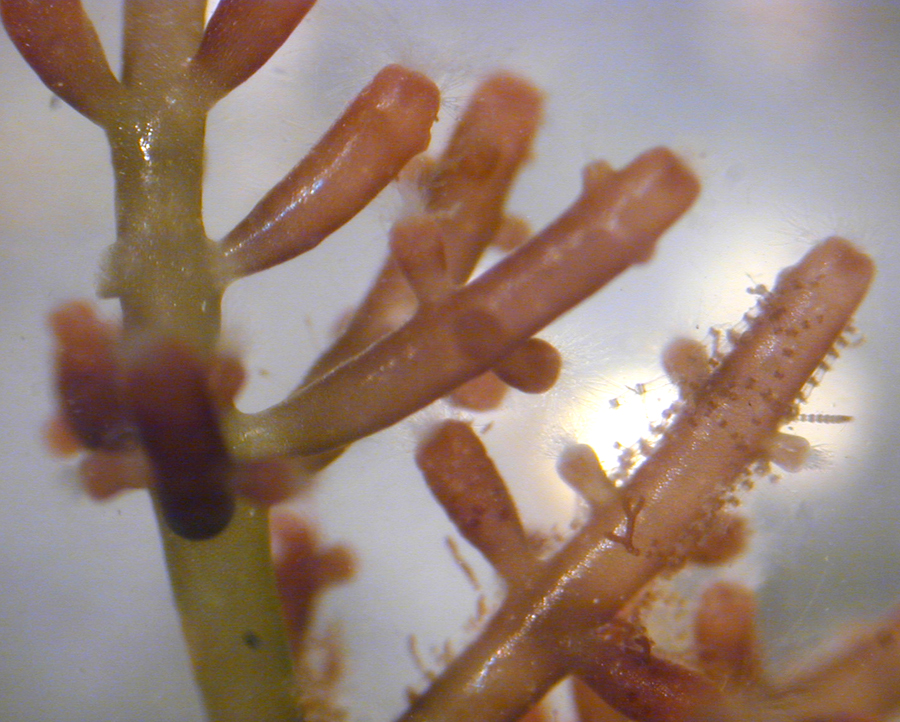
The rhodophyte Laurencia

- Rhodophyceae Thuret, 1855, emend. Rabenhorst, 1863, emend. Adl et al., 2005 (Rhodophyta Wettstein 1901) – red algae

Red algae form one of the largest groups of algae. Most are seaweeds, being multicellular and marine. Their red colour comes from phycobiliproteins, used as accessory pigments in light capture for photosynthesis.

- Chloroplastida Adl et al., 2005 (Viridiplantae Cavalier-Smith 1981; Chlorobionta Jeffrey 1982, emend. Bremer 1985, emend. Lewis and McCourt 2004; Chlorobiota Kendrick and Crane 1997)

Chloroplastida is the term chosen by Adl et al. for the group made up of the green algae and land plants (embryophytes). Except where lost secondarily, all have chloroplasts without a peptidoglycan layer and lack phycobiliproteins.

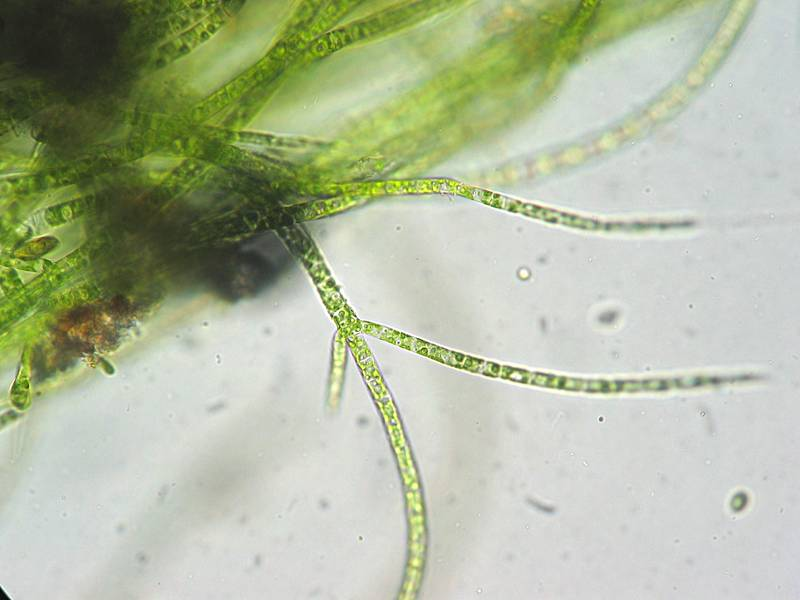
The chlorophyte Stigeoclonium

- Chlorophyta Pascher, 1914, emend. Lewis & McCourt, 2004 – green algae (part)

Adl et al. employ a narrow definition of the Chlorophyta; other sources include the Chlorodendrales and Prasinophytae, which may themselves be combined.

- Ulvophyceae Mattox & Stewart, 1984
- Trebouxiophyceae Friedl, 1995 (Pleurastrophyceae Mattox et al. 1984; Microthamniales Melkonian 1990)
- Chlorophyceae Christensen, 1994

- Chlorodendrales Fritsch, 1917 – green algae (part)
- Prasinophytae Cavalier-Smith, 1998, emend. Lewis & McCourt, 2004 – green algae (part)
- Mesostigma Lauterborn, 1894, emend. McCourt in Adl et al., 2005 (Mesostigmata Turmel, Otis, and Lemieux 2002)
- Charophyta Karol et al., 2001, emend. Lewis & McCourt, 2004 (Charophyceae Smith 1938, emend. Mattox and Stewart 1984) – green algae (part) and land plants

Charophyta sensu lato, as used by Adl et al., is a monophyletic group which is made up of some green algae, including the stoneworts (Charophyta sensu stricto), as well as the land plants (embryophytes).

- Sub-divisions other than Streptophytina (below) were not given by Adl et al.

Other sources would include the green algal groups Chlorokybales, Klebsormidiales, Zygnematales and Coleochaetales.

- Streptophytina Lewis & McCourt, 2004 – stoneworts and land plants

- Charales Lindley 1836 (Charophytae Engler, 1887) – stoneworts
- Plantae Haeckel 1866 (Cormophyta Endlicher, 1836; Embryophyta Endlicher, 1836, emend. Lewis & McCourt, 2004) – land plants (embryophytes)

=== External phylogeny ===
Below is a consensus reconstruction of the relationships of Archaeplastida with its nearest neighbours, mainly based on molecular data.

- Diaphoretickes
  - - - Meteora
      - Hemimastigophora
    - ? (Provora)
    - - - Provora
        - Haptista
        - TSAR
          - Telonemia
          - SAR
            - Rhizaria
            - Halvaria
              - Stramenopiles
              - Alveolata
      - CAM
        - - Cryptista
          - Microheliella maris
        - Archaeplastida

There has been disagreement near the Archaeplastida root, e.g. whether Cryptista emerged within the Archaeplastida. In 2014 a thorough review was published on these inconsistencies. The position of Telonemia and Picozoa are not clear. Also Hacrobia (Haptista + Cryptista) may be completely associated with the SAR clade. The SAR are often seen as eukaryote-eukaryote hybrids, contributing to the confusion in the genetic analyses.

A sister of Gloeomargarita lithophora has been engulfed by an ancestor of the Archaeplastida, leading to the plastids which are living in permanent endosymbiosis in most of the descendant lineages. Because both Gloeomargarita and related cyanobacteria, in addition to the most primitive archaeplastids, all live in freshwater, it seems the Archaeplastida originated in freshwater, and only colonized the oceans in the late Proterozoic.

=== Internal phylogeny ===
In 2019, a phylogeny of the Archaeplastida based on genomes and transcriptomes from 1,153 plant species was proposed. The placing of algal groups is supported by phylogenies based on genomes from the Mesostigmatophyceae and Chlorokybophyceae that have since been sequenced. Both the "chlorophyte algae" and the "streptophyte algae" are treated as paraphyletic (vertical bars beside phylogenetic tree diagram) in this analysis. The classification of Bryophyta is supported both by Puttick et al. 2018, and by phylogenies involving the hornwort genomes that have also since been sequenced. Recent work on non-photosynthetic algae places Rhodelphidia as sister to Rhodophyta or to Glaucophyta and Viridiplantae; and Picozoa sister to that pair of groups.

- Archaeplastida
  - Rhodaria
    - Picozoa
    - - Rhodelphidia
      - Rhodophyta
  - - Glaucophyta
    - Viridiplantae (green plants)
      - Chlorophyta
      - - Prasinococcales
        - Streptophyta/ Charophyta *
          - - Mesostigmatophyceae
            - - Chlorokybophyceae
              - Spirotaenia
          - - Klebsormidiales
            - - Chara
              - - Coleochaetales
                - - Zygnematophyceae
                  - Embryophytes (land plants)
                    - - Bryophytes
                        - Hornworts
                        - - Liverworts
                          - Mosses
                    - - Lycophytes
                      - Euphyllophyta
                        - Ferns
                        - Spermatophytes (seed plants)
                          - Gymnosperms
                          - Angiosperms

== Morphology ==
All archaeplastidans have plastids (chloroplasts) that carry out photosynthesis and are believed to be derived from endosymbiotic cyanobacteria. In glaucophytes, perhaps the most primitive members of the group, the chloroplast is called a cyanelle and shares several features with cyanobacteria, including a peptidoglycan cell wall, that are not retained in other members of the group. The resemblance of cyanelles to cyanobacteria supports the endosymbiotic theory.

The cells of most archaeplastidans have walls, commonly but not always made of cellulose.

The Archaeplastida vary widely in the degree of their cell organization, from isolated cells to filaments to colonies to multi-celled organisms. The earliest were unicellular, and many groups remain so today. Multicellularity evolved separately in several groups, including red algae, ulvophyte green algae, and in the green algae that gave rise to stoneworts and land plants.

== Endosymbiosis ==
Because the ancestral archaeplastidan is hypothesized to have acquired its chloroplasts directly by engulfing cyanobacteria, the event is known as a primary endosymbiosis (as reflected in the name chosen for the group 'Archaeplastida' i.e. 'ancient plastid'). In 2013 it was discovered that one species of green algae, Cymbomonas tetramitiformis in the order Pyramimonadales, is a mixotroph and able to support itself through both phagotrophy and phototrophy. It is not yet known if this is a primitive trait and therefore defines the last common ancestor of Archaeplastida, which could explain how it obtained its chloroplasts, or if it is a trait regained by horizontal gene transfer. Since then more species of mixotrophic green algae, such as Pyramimonas tychotreta and Mantoniella antarctica, has been found.

Evidence for primary endosymbiosis includes the presence of a double membrane around the chloroplasts; one membrane belonged to the bacterium, and the other to the eukaryote that captured it. Over time, many genes from the chloroplast have been transferred to the nucleus of the host cell through endosymbiotic gene transfer (EGT). It is estimated that 6–20% of the archaeplastidan genome consist of genes transferred from the endosymbiont. The presence of such genes in the nuclei of eukaryotes without chloroplasts suggests this transfer happened early in the evolution of the group.

Other eukaryotes with chloroplasts appear to have gained them by engulfing a single-celled archaeplastidan with its own bacterially-derived chloroplasts. Because these events involve endosymbiosis of cells that have their own endosymbionts, the process is called secondary endosymbiosis. The chloroplasts of such eukaryotes are typically surrounded by more than two membranes, reflecting a history of multiple engulfment. The chloroplasts of euglenids, chlorarachniophytes and a small group of dinoflagellates appear to be captured green algae, whereas those of the remaining photosynthetic eukaryotes, such as heterokont algae, cryptophytes, haptophytes, and dinoflagellates, appear to be captured red algae.

== Fossil record ==
Perhaps the most ancient remains of Archaeplastida are putative red algae (Rafatazmia) within stromatolites in 1600 Ma (million years ago) rocks in India, as well as possible alga fossils (Tuanshanzia) from China's Gaoyuzhuang Biota of a similar age. Somewhat more recent are microfossils from the Roper group in northern Australia. The structure of these single-celled fossils resembles that of modern green algae. They date to the Mesoproterozoic Era, about 1500 to 1300 Ma. These fossils are consistent with a molecular clock study that calculated that this clade diverged about 1500 Ma. The oldest fossil that can be assigned to a specific modern group is the red alga Bangiomorpha, from 1200 Ma.

In the late Neoproterozoic Era, algal fossils became more numerous and diverse. Eventually, in the Paleozoic Era, plants emerged onto land, and have continued to flourish up to the present.
