= Picozoa =

- Movement of a Picomonas judraskeda cell
- Animation of the 3D structure of Picomonas judraskeda

Scientific classification
- Domain: Eukaryota
- Supergroup: Archaeplastida
- Clade?: Pararhoda
- Phylum: Picozoa; Seenivasan et al. 2013
- Class: Picomonadea; Seenivasan et al. 2013
- Order: Picomonadida; Seenivasan et al. 2013
- Family: Picomonadidae; Seenivasan et al. 2013
- Genus: Picomonas; Seenivasan et al. 2013
- Species: P. judraskeda

Binomial name
- Picomonas judraskeda Seenivasan et al. 2013

Synonyms
- Picobiliphyta

Phylum of marine unicellular heterotrophic eukaryotes

Picozoa, Picobiliphyta, picobiliphytes, or piliphytes are protists of a phylum of marine unicellular heterotrophic eukaryotes with a size of less than about 3 micrometers. They were formerly treated as eukaryotic algae and the smallest member of photosynthetic picoplankton before it was discovered they do not perform photosynthesis. The phylum currently contains a single species, Picomonas judraskeda. They probably belong in the Archaeplastida as sister of the Rhodophyta.

They were formerly placed within the cryptomonads-haptophytes assemblage.

== Discovery ==
At the end of the 1990s, the European project "Picodiv" clarified which organisms occur in picoplankton. In addition, for a period of two years, samples were taken in the Atlantic, in the Mediterranean, before the coast of Scotland, Alaska and Norway. Picozoa were found particularly within the nutrient-poor ranges from cold coastal seas, where they can constitute up to 50 percent of the biomass.

== Affinities to other organisms ==
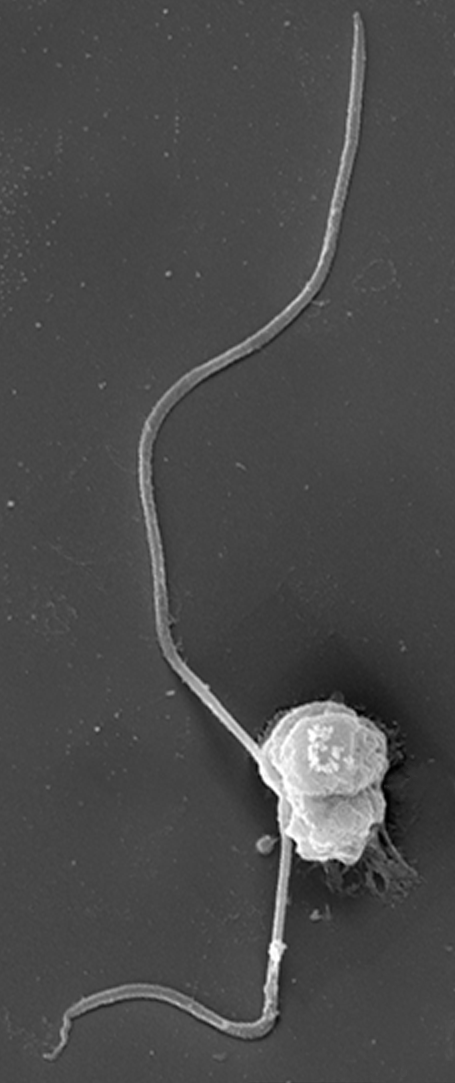
Picomonas judraskeda

Picozoa were first detected using 18S ribosomal RNA genes in 2007. The identity of new organisms was deduced from a comparison of familiar and unfamiliar gene sequences. "The gene sequences found in these algae could not be associated with any previously known group of organisms", explain Klaus Valentin and Linda Medlin, co-authors of the study and molecular biologists at the Alfred Wegener Institute for Polar and Marine Research in Bremerhaven. The algae in this study were found in plankton samples originating from various regions of the North Atlantic and the Mediterranean. The scientists have discovered a group of organisms which, despite being completely new to science, have a wide distribution. "This is a good indication for how much there is still to discover in the oceans, especially using molecular tools", says Valentin.

Apart from the unfamiliar gene sequences, the researchers also detected phycobiliproteins. In red algae, for example, these proteins occur as pigments. But in this newly discovered group of algae, the phycobiliproteins appear to be contained inside the plastids, where the photosynthesis occurs. Hence, it provides a clear indication that the researchers are dealing with previously unidentified group of algae. Referring to their small size and the presence of phycobiliproteins, the researchers named the new group picobiliphytes.

Two studies published in 2011 found the hypothesis that biliphytes, or picobiliphytes, were photosynthetic was likely to be false. A 2011 study by an international team from the Monterey Bay Aquarium Research Institute, Dalhousie University and the Natural History Museum London found that cells in the Pacific Ocean did not have fluorescence indicative of photosynthetic pigments, and concluded "...biliphytes are likely not obligate photoautotrophs but rather facultative mixotrophs or phagotrophs, whereby transient detection of orange fluorescence could represent ingested prey items (e.g., the cyanobacterium Synechococcus)". A study later in 2011, conducted by researchers at Rutgers University and Bigelow Laboratory for Ocean Sciences, used whole genome shotgun sequence data from three individual picobiliphyte cells to show absence of plastid-targeted or photosystem proteins within the fragments of nuclear genome sequence they reconstructed. This again suggested that picobiliphytes are heterotrophs.

In 2013, Seenivasan working in conjunction with Michael Melkonian (University of Cologne) and Linda Medlin (Marine Biological Association of the UK) formally described the picobiliphytes as the heterotrophic nanoflagellate phylum, Picozoa, and published thin sections of the cells. Several unique features in the cell, such as a feeding organelle, unusual movement, and heterotrophic mode of nutrition, substantiate their unique phylogenetic position. No traces of viral or bacterial particles were found inside these heterotrophic cells, which prompted these authors to suggest that they feed on small organic particles.

== See also ==
- Microphyte
- Picoeukaryote
- Picocyanobacteria
- Picoplankton
- Biliphyta
