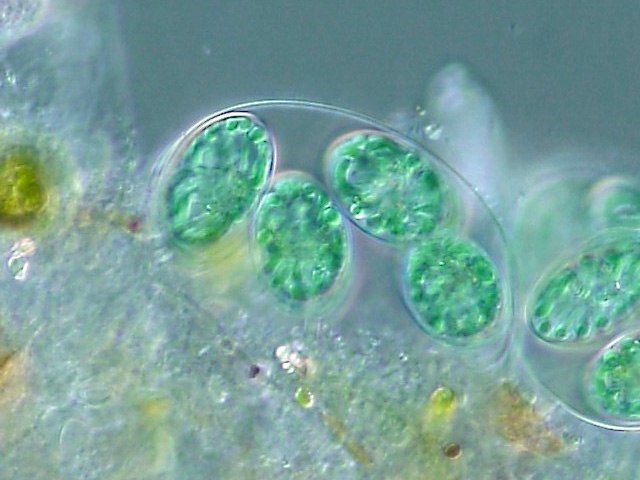
- Glaucocystis sp.

Scientific classification
- Domain: Eukaryota
- Supergroup: Archaeplastida
- Division: Glaucophyta; Skuja 1954
- Class: Glaucophyceae; Bohlin 1901

Orders
- Glaucocystales; Gloeochaetales

Synonyms
- Glaucocystophyta Kies & Kremer 1986

= Glaucophyte =

Glaucophyta

Division of algae

The glaucophytes, also known as glaucocystophytes or glaucocystids, are a small group of unicellular algae found in freshwater and moist terrestrial environments, less common today than they were during the Proterozoic. The stated number of species in the group varies from about 14 to 26. Together with the much larger sister taxa Rhodophyta (red algae) and Viridiplantae/Chloroplastida (green algae and land plants), they form the primary algae clade Archaeplastida.

The glaucophytes are of interest to biologists studying the evolution of chloroplasts as they may be similar to the ancestral algal type that led to the red algae and green plants, i.e. glaucophytes may be basal archaeplastids.

== Reproduction ==
Unlike red and green algae, glaucophytes reproduce exclusively through asexual means. They undergo open mitosis without centrioles, a trait shared with other basal eukaryotes. Reproductive modes include binary fission, zoospore formation, and autosporulation. For example, Cyanophora paradoxa divides longitudinally, producing two daughter cells, each inheriting a single cyanelle. Species of Glaucocystis reproduce via non-motile autospores. To date, there is no evidence of sexual reproduction in glaucophytes.

== Characteristics ==
The plastids of glaucophytes are known as 'muroplasts', 'cyanoplasts', or 'cyanelles'. Unlike the plastids in other organisms, they have a peptidoglycan layer, believed to be a relic of the endosymbiotic origin of plastids from cyanobacteria. This peptidoglycan layer plays a functional role in plastid division and is considered molecular evidence of their cyanobacterial ancestry. Glaucophytes contain the photosynthetic pigment chlorophyll a. Along with red algae and cyanobacteria, they harvest light via phycobilisomes, structures consisting largely of phycobiliproteins. The green algae and land plants have lost that pigment. Like red algae, and in contrast to green algae and plants, glaucophytes store fixed carbon in the cytosol.

This cytosolic carbon fixation, rather than fixation within plastids, is considered a retained ancestral trait. Glaucophyte phycobilisomes are composed primarily of phycocyanin and allophycocyanin, two key pigments also present in cyanobacteria. These pigments allow absorption of light at wavelengths that chlorophyll cannot, enhancing light harvesting in low-light aquatic environments. Studies of endosymbiotic gene transfer (EGT) suggest that several genes originally encoded in cyanobacterial ancestors have been relocated to the nuclear genome in glaucophytes, reflecting early stages of plastid-host genomic integration. The evolution of glycogen and starch metabolism in eukaryotes gives molecular clues to understand the establishment of plastid endosymbiosis.

The most early-diverging genus is Cyanophora, which only has one or two plastids. When there are two, they are semi-connected.

Glaucophytes have mitochondria with flat cristae, and undergo open mitosis without centrioles. Motile forms have two unequal flagella, which may have fine hairs and are anchored by a multilayered system of microtubules, both of which are similar to forms found in some green algae.

Representation of a glaucophyte: 1. Anterior flagellum (with hairs); 2. Mucocyst, discharges a mucous mass sometimes used in cyst formation; 3. Plate; 4. Plate vesicle; 5. Starch granule; 6. Furrow; 7. Anterior folds; 8. Basal body; 9. Contractile vacuole, regulates the quantity of water inside a cell; 10. Golgi apparatus; modifies proteins and sends them out of the cell; 11. Plastid membranes (2, primary); 12. Peptidoglycan, a polysaccharide layer surrounding the cytoplasmic membrane; 13. Central body; 14. Thylakoids, site of the light-dependent reactions of photosynthesis; 15. Phycobilisome; 16. Nucleolus; 17. Nucleus; 18. Endoplasmic reticulum, the transport network for molecules going to specific parts of the cell; 19. Mitochondrion, creates ATP (energy) for the cell, (flat cristae); 20. Posterior flagellum

== Phylogeny ==
=== External ===
Together with red algae and Viridiplantae (green algae and land plants), glaucophytes form the Archaeplastida – a group of plastid-containing organisms that may share a unique common ancestor that established an endosymbiotic association with a cyanobacterium. The relationship among the three groups remains uncertain, although it is most likely that glaucophytes diverged first:

- Archaeplastida
  - Glaucophyta
  - - Red algae
    - Viridiplantae

The alternative, that glaucophytes and red algae form a clade, has been shown to be less plausible, but cannot be ruled out.

=== Internal ===
The internal phylogeny of the glaucophytes and the number of genera and species varies considerably among taxonomic sources. A phylogeny of the Glaucophyta published in 2017 divided the group into three families, and includes five genera:

- Glaucophyta
  - Cyanophoraceae
    Cyanophora
  - - Gloeochaetaceae
      - Cyanoptyche
      - Gloeochaete
    - Glaucocystidaceae
      - Glaucocystopsis
      - Glaucocystis

=== Taxonomy ===
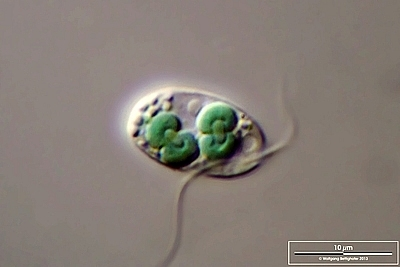
Cyanophora paradoxa

A 2019 list of the described glaucophyte species has the same three subdivisions, treated as orders, but includes a further five unplaced possible species, producing a total of between 14 and 19 possible species.

- Order Cyanophorales
  - Genus Cyanophora – 5–6 species
- Order Glaucocystales
  - Genus Glaucocystis – 7–8 species
- Order Gloeochaetales
  - Cyanoptyche – 1 species
  - Gloeochaete – 1 species
- Other possible species
  - ?Archaeopsis monococca Skuja
  - ?Chalarodora azurea Pascher
  - ?Glaucocystopsis africana Bourrelly
  - ?Peliaina cyanea Pascher
  - ?Strobilomonas cyaneus Schiller

As of May 2026, AlgaeBase divided glaucophytes into only two groups, placing Cyanophora in Glaucocystales rather than Cyanophorales (however the entry was dated 2011). AlgaeBase included a total of 25 species in eight genera:

- Glaucocystales
  - Chalarodora Pascher – 1 species
  - Cyanophora Korshikov – 6 species
  - Glaucocystis Itzigsohn – 13 species
  - Glaucocystopsis Bourrelly – 1 species
  - Peliaina Pascher – 1 species
  - Strobilomonas Schiller – 1 species
- Gloeochaetales
  - Cyanoptyche Pascher – 1 species
  - Gloeochaete Lagerheim – 1 species

None of the species of Glaucophyta is particularly common in nature.

The glaucophytes were considered before as part of family Oocystaceae, in the order Chlorococcales.
