= Cryptochrysis =

Scientific classification
- Domain: Eukaryota
- Clade: Pancryptista
- Phylum: Cryptista
- Superclass: Cryptomonada
- Class: Cryptophyceae
- Order: Cryptomonadales
- Family: Cryptochrysidaceae; Pascher, 1911
- Genus: Cryptochrysis; Pascher, 1911

Type species
- Cryptochrysis commutata Pascher, 1911

Synonyms
- Chroomonas (Pascher, 1911) Butcher, 1967

Genus of cryptomonads

Cryptochrysis is a formerly recognized genus of cryptomonads first proposed by Adolf Pascher in 1911. He initially treated it as the sole genus in family Cryptochrysidaceae, but later treated it as a member of the Cryptochrysideae subfamily of Cryptomonadaceae, along with Rhodomonas, Chroomonas, and Cyanomonas. In 1967, R.W. Butcher relegated the group to a subgenus within Chroomonas.

It is now regarded as paraphyletic, with its species now various reassigned into Pyrenomonas, Rhinomonas and Cryptomonas.

== Species ==
- Cryptochrysis amoeboidea Pascher 1917
- Cryptochrysis atlantica Lackey 1940
- Cryptochrysis carinata Czosnowski 1948
- Cryptochrysis commutata Pascher 1911

→ Cryptomonas commutata (Pascher 1911) Hoef-Emden 2007

- Chroomonas (Cryptochrysis) fragarioides Butcher 1967

→ Rhinomonas fragarioides (Butcher 1967) Hill & Wetherbee 1988

- Cryptochrysis fulva Butcher 1952

→ Rhinomonas fulva (Butcher 1952) Hill & Wetherbee 1988

- Cryptochrysis gigas Pascher 1917
- Cryptochrysis lateralis Butcher 1952

→ Rhinomonas lateralis (Butcher 1952) Hill & Wetherbee 1988

- Cryptochrysis magna Kufferath 1942
- Cryptochrysis minor Nygaard 1950
- Cryptochrysis minutissima
- Cryptochrysis ovalis Petersen & Hansen 1961
- Cryptochrysis pochmannii Huber-Pestalozzi 1950
- Cryptochrysis polychrysis Pascher 1913
- Cryptochrysis rubens
- Cryptochrysis virescens
