= Chroomonas elegans =

Scientific classification
- Domain: Eukaryota
- Clade: Pancryptista
- Phylum: Cryptista
- Superclass: Cryptomonada
- Class: Cryptophyceae
- Order: Pyrenomonadales
- Family: Chroomonadaceae
- Genus: Chroomonas
- Species: C. elegans

Binomial name
- Chroomonas elegans Schiller, 1957

Species of alga

Chroomonas elegans is a species of cryptophytes. The type locality is Lake Neusiedl, at the Austria-Hungarian border.
