= Chroomonas baltica =

Scientific classification
- Domain: Eukaryota
- Clade: Pancryptista
- Phylum: Cryptista
- Superclass: Cryptomonada
- Class: Cryptophyceae
- Order: Pyrenomonadales
- Family: Chroomonadaceae
- Genus: Chroomonas
- Species: C. baltica

Binomial name
- Chroomonas baltica Carter, 1937

Species of alga

Chroomonas baltica is a species of cryptophyte first described by Julius Büttner in 1910, as Cyanomonas baltica. It would be reclassified to its current genus by Nellie Carter in 1937.

Büttner observed C. baltica off the coast of Strande in 1910, naming it Cyanomonas baltica, from the blue color of the chromatophore and the sea it was discovered.
