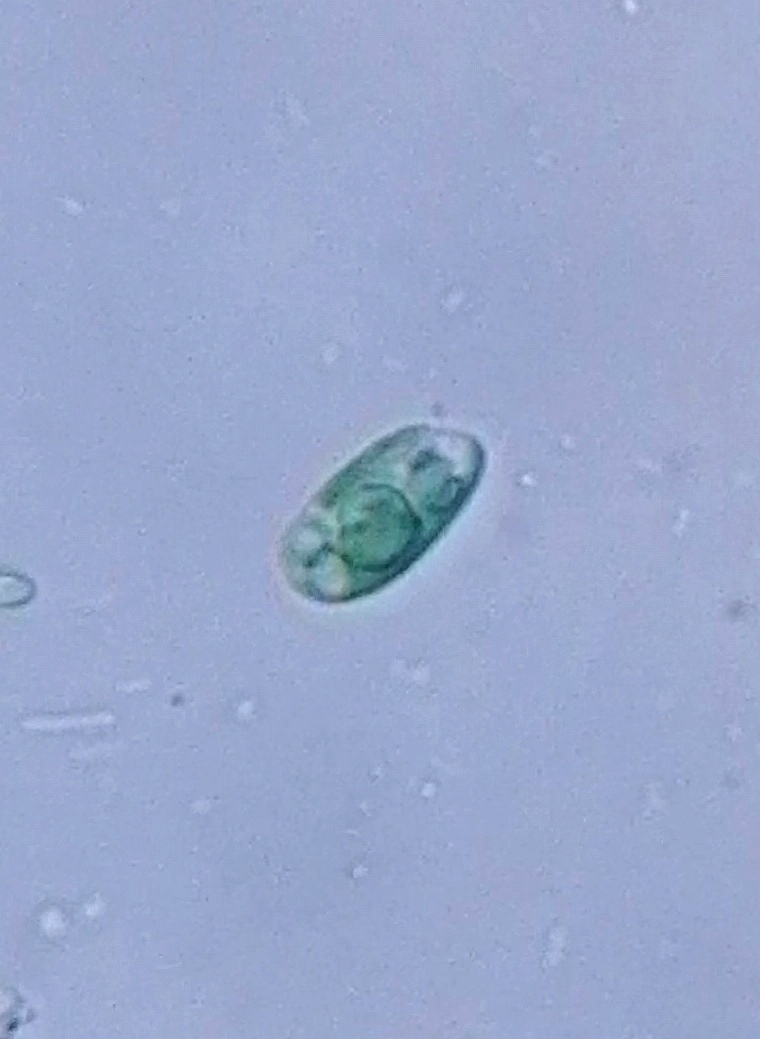
- Chroomonas sp.

Scientific classification
- Domain: Eukaryota
- Clade: Pancryptista
- Phylum: Cryptista
- Superclass: Cryptomonada
- Class: Cryptophyceae
- Order: Pyrenomonadales
- Family: Chroomonadaceae; Clay, Cugrens & Lee 1999

Genera
- Chroomonas; Falcomonas; Komma; Hemiselmis; Planonephros; Nodeana; Protochrysis

Synonyms
- Falcomonadaceae Daugbjerg 2018; Hemiselmidaceae Butcher 1967 ex Silva 1980; Planonephraceae Christensen 1967; Senniaceae Skuja 1948

= Chroomonadaceae =

Family of cryptomonads

Chroomonadaceae is a family of cryptomonads first recognized by Clay et al in 1999 as including genera Chroomonas, Falcomonas, and Komma. Following a molecular phylogenic study in 2002, Hemiselmis was also placed within the Chroomonadaceae. Today, the family is generally recognized as sister to the Pyrenomonadaceae.

They are one of only two groups of cryptomonads (alongside Rhinomonas) to lack a rhizostyle. They are also distinguished by the lack of a cleavage furrow and the presence of several phycocyanins and phycoerythrins not observed in any other cryptomonad taxa.

== Taxonomy ==
Laza-Martinez, 2012

- Chroomonadaceae
  - Falcomonas daucoides
  - - Hemiselmis
    - - - Chroomonas nordstedtii
        - Chroomonas pochmannii
      - - - Chroomonas coerulea
          - Chroomonas pauciplastida
          - Chroomonas placoidea
          - Chroomonas mesostigmatica
        - - Komma caudata
          - Chroomonas sp.

== Gallery ==
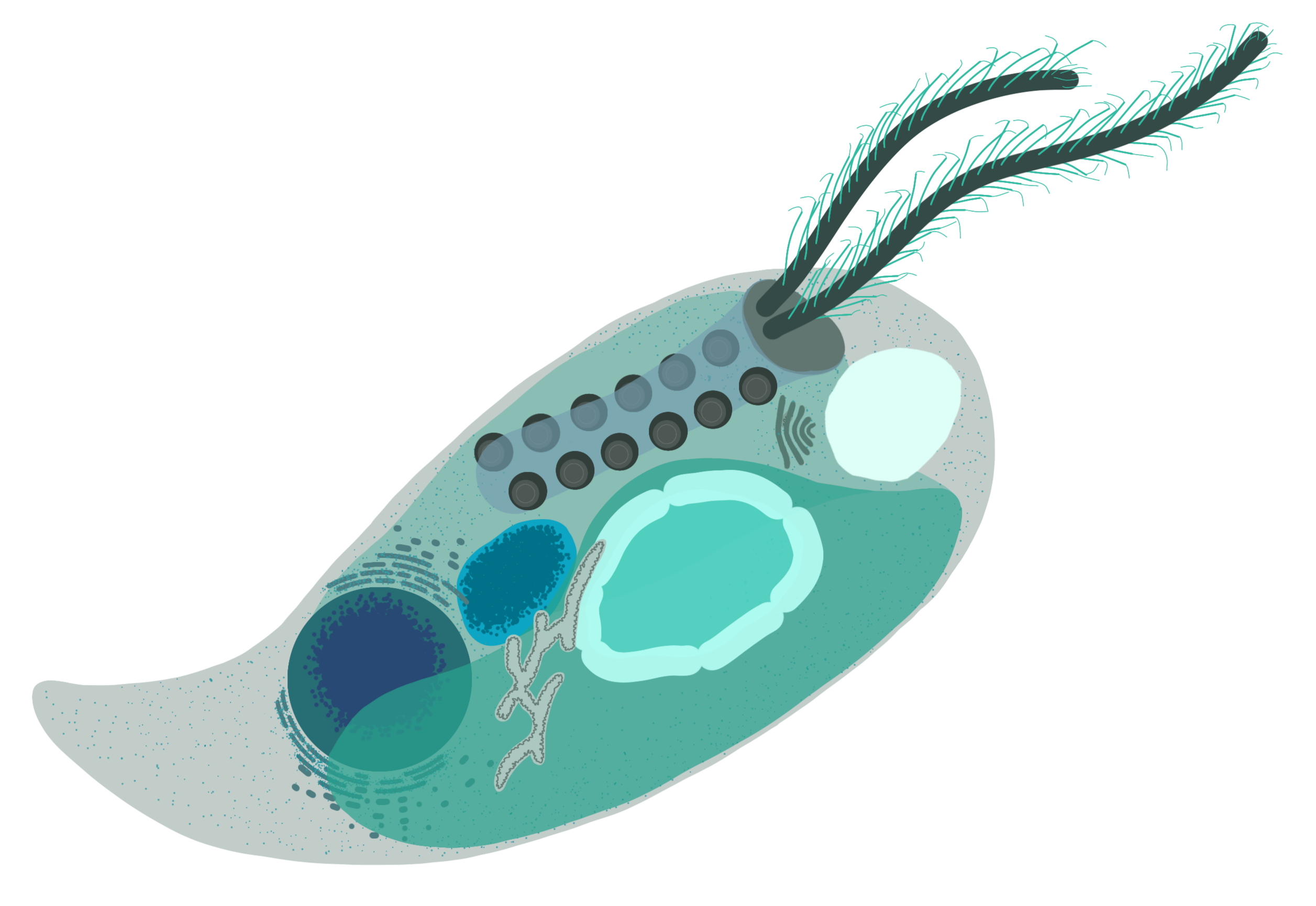
Komma caudata

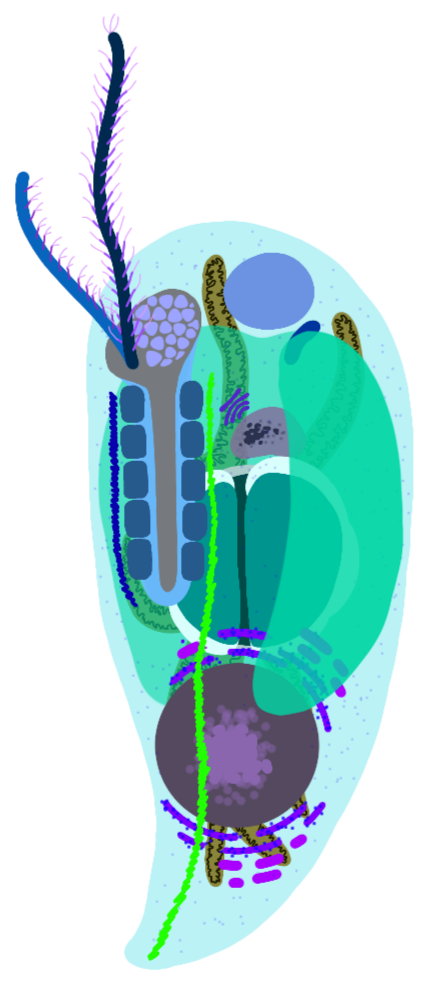
Falcomonas daucoides
