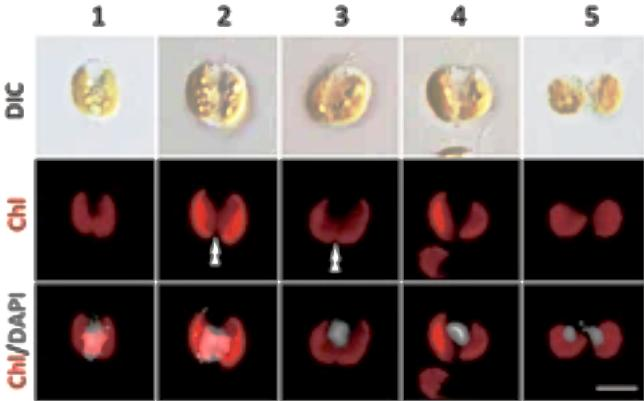
- Guillardia theta. DAPI-staining images showing the representative cells of cell cycle stages based on the localization of the nucleus and the shape of the chloroplast. DIC, images of differential interference contact; Chl, chloroplast autofluorescence; Chl/DAPI, merged images of Chl and DAPI. The double arrowhead indicates constriction of the chloroplast division site. Scale bar = 5 µm

Scientific classification
- Domain: Eukaryota
- Supergroup: Cryptista
- Division: Cryptophyta
- Class: Cryptophyceae
- Order: Pyrenomonadales
- Family: Geminigeraceae
- Genus: Guillardia; D. R. A. Hill & R. Wetherbee
- Species: G. theta

Binomial name
- Guillardia theta D. R. A. Hill & R. Wetherbee

= Guillardia =

Genus of single-celled organisms

Guillardia is a genus of marine biflagellate cryptomonad algae with a plastid obtained through secondary endosymbiosis of a red alga.

Originally identified in Connecticut by Richard Guillard in the 1960s, Guillardia only has one described species. The genus is rare in the wild, but cultures well and has been frequently studied since its original discovery. The general morphology of the small cell is well described, and shares many similarities with other cryptomonads, though it contains a unique organization of periplasm. Guillardia is the only cryptomonad to have its entire nucleus, nucleomorph, and plastid genome sequenced. This knowledge has prompted further studies on gene transfer between chloroplast, the ancestral red algal nucleomorph, and the nucleus, as well as regulation of photosynthetic and cell cycle gene expression within the plastid. The genus is also important in research across biological disciplines; Guillardia serves as a model organism in the study of secondary endosymbiosis and photosynthesis in cryptomonads due to its ease of culture and sequenced genome. Two anion channelrhodopsins have also been isolated from Guillardia theta for neurobiological research applications as optogenetic inhibitors.

== Etymology ==
Originally this genus was referred to as "Cryptomonas species theta" or "Flagellate theta'. It was then named Guillardia by Hill and Weatherbee after Dr. Robert Guillard, the researcher who originally isolated the genus.

Type Species: Guillardia theta.

== History of knowledge ==
The cryptomonad Guillardia theta was first isolated by Dr. Robert Guillard in Connecticut in 1963, where he defined it as "flagellate theta" in a symposium on the organic sources of nitrogen in marine diatoms. Since then, the organism has been successfully cultured many times. When it was referred to as Cryptomonas theta in the early 1980s, the flagella and a unique periplast were described. Following these studies, the plastid genome was mapped and Hill and Weatherbee named and characterized the genus in 1990, before the plastid genome was fully sequenced in 1999, confirming the plastid's common ancestry with red algae. Since these original studies, many other aspects of this organism have been identified, including the mechanisms of nucleomorph and plastid division and their regulation, and photosynthetic pigments, mechanisms, and regulation. Because it grows so well in culture, Guillardia theta is also frequently used as a model organism in modern day studies investigating cryptomonads characteristics.

== Habitat and ecology ==
In the wild, Guillardia theta is a rare planktonic marine organism, and the majority of studies have been completed from cultures. The genus was originally isolated from Milford Harbor in Connecticut, and has only been found in one other location in Denmark since its original discovery. Milford Harbor includes many discrete areas such as estuaries, mud flats, marine basins, marinas, beaches, marshes, and coastal shores that provide habitats to a variety of different organisms. Though the precise isolation location was not recorded, the genus is thought to proliferate as phytoplankton in the still water of the marine basin.

A. Larsen is the only other researcher to have identified Guillardia in the wild within the Wadden Sea in Denmark. However, this was only revealed through a personal communique with Hill and Weatherbee, and never published. Another northern marine habitat, the Wadden Sea consists of an agglomeration of sandbanks that provide estuary, open water, marsh, and sandy beach habitats to the local ecosystems.

As the genus is relatively rare in the wild, its role in ecosystems is not well understood. Guillardia is a photosynthetic phytoplankton with two plastids, indicating a role in primary production within the system. Additionally, ciliates are known predators of the genus in culture, suggesting the role of Guillardia as prey within aquatic systems. Mesodinium pulex, a well studied phagotrophic ciliate common to marine, brackish, and freshwater environments ingested and grew on Guillardia theta cultures.

== Description ==
=== Morphology ===
The morphology of the genus Guillardia is well described. The cell is dorso-ventrally flattened and approximately 7-11μm long. As a member of the cryptomonads, it has an anterior gullet and contains a nucleus with nucleolus, a double lobed, four membraned plastid with pyrenoid, a nucleomorph closely associated with the plastid, mitochondria, Golgi apparatus associated with two flagella, starch deposits, and ejectosomes on the gullet and periplast. The structure of the periplasm, a layer of thin sheets composed of irregular plates made from crystalline subunits, is a defining characteristic of the genus. Guillardia's inner periplasm consists of a single sheet adjacent to the plasma membrane while the inner periplasm of other cryptomonads is made of from uniformly shaped plates. In both types of periplasm, the peripheral ejectosomes lay beneath the periplasm in vesicles and a non crystalline material separates the periplasm from the plasma membrane.

Ejectosomes in Guillardia and other cryptomonads are primarily used for defense and evasion, lining the gullet of the cell. In Guillardia, uneven elongated strands lay within vesicles, while strand length varies across other cryptomonad genera. Strand length ranges from 200 nm to 3.6 μm. In response to external stressors like rapid pH change, osmolarity change, or light intensity changes, coils shoot out from their vesicles in the surrounding environment. The impact of the ejectosome strands with an object such as another organism causes the uneven backwards motion of Guillardia for predator evasion.

=== Plastid ===
The plastid in Guillardia arose from a secondary endosymbiosis event of a red algal cell. Like other cryptomonads, Guillardia is key for understanding secondary endosymbiosis as it retains the nucleus of the algal endosymbiont in the form of a nucleomorph within a periplastidial compartment and four membranes surrounding the plastidial complex. The outermost membrane is hypothesized to be a remnant of the ancestral phagocytic vesicle and is continuous with the Guillardia endoplasmic reticulum. The small periplastidial cytoplasm is also hypothesized to retain components of its cytoskeleton, due to tubulin genes localized to the nucleomorph. While many plastidial proteins remain in the nucleomorph, those that underwent endosymbiotic gene transfer to the host nucleus are targeted back through the outermost membrane through co-translational translocation with a bipartite N-terminal signal sequence. Each subsequent membrane the protein passes retains unique translocation mechanisms. Also contained within the plastid are eukaryotic ribosomes and a starch granule filled pyrenoid, where CO_{2} fixation occurs through the enzyme RUBISCO.

Like other cryptomonads, the light harvesting pigments of the plastidial chloroplasts are phycobiliproteins and chlorophyll a/c-binding proteins, homologous to those found in red algal lineages. Unlike in red algae, the phycobiliprotein antenna in Guillardia are localized in the thylakoid lumens as small soluble protein complexes, instead of the large antenna associated with the thylakoid membranes characteristic of algal photosynthesis. Mechanisms used to control photosynthetic pigments in Guillardia vary depending on the growth stage. In logarithmic growth stages, Guillardia uses state transitions to modulate energy inputs, while in the stationary growth phase, the cell uses non photochemical quenching, a mechanism to protect plants and algae from high light intensity. It is unclear why the two mechanisms of regulating energy input are differentiated in the different growth phases of Guillardia.

=== Motility ===
Motility occurs primarily through two asymmetric flagella, the longest protruding anteriorly from the gullet, while the shorter flagellum points to the back of the cell. A rhizostyle and rootlet system also contribute to the motility of Guillardia. Interestingly, the photaxis mechanisms of Guillardia theta which incorporate anion channelrhodopsins to initiate a motion response have been used in neuroscience applications as optogenetic inhibitors.

=== Cell division ===
In order to properly divide asexually, Guillardia must replicate its cell, as well as the nucleomorph and chloroplast of the plastid. The genus divides through mitosis, and has never been observed dividing sexually; however, meiosis related genes have been found in the nucleus, suggesting it has the capability to do so. Mitosis in Guillardia begins after plastid division, with the formation of mitotic spindles and initiation of basal body and flagella division. Like many other flagellated protists, both preexisting flagella become the daughter locomotion flagellum, while new basal bodies develop into trailing flagellum through flagellar transformation. Through metaphase, a chromatin plate with tunnels results from the dissolution of the nuclear membrane. During anaphase, microtubule spindles thread through the plate tunnels and attach to chromatin, splitting the plate in two. Remnants of the nuclear membrane also appear to border the mitotic spindle remaining in contact with the endoplasmic reticulum throughout mitosis. Cytokinesis occurs in Guillardia during metaphase and anaphase, with a thin layer of amorphous materials instead of microtubule structures.

Plastidial division occurs prior to flagellar division in preprophase, and both nucleomorph and chloroplast division occur once per Guillardia cell cycle. Plastid division occurs via the constriction of the dorsal bridge that connects the two lobes of the plastid. Before completion of chloroplast division, the nucleomorph divides by invaginating the inner and outer nucleomorph membranes. Synchronization of chloroplast, nucleomorph, and host cell division is vital for the evolution of the red algal endosymbiont into an organelle. Nucleus encoded nucleomorph HISTONE H2A mRNA accumulates during S phase, while nucleomorph encoded genes that regulate nucleomorph replication and division are constantly expressed. This suggests that the endosymbiont lost the ability to regulate replication cycle dependent transcription, but the control of host nucleus cell-cycle dependent genes regulates nucleomorph and chloroplast replication and division.

=== Characteristics of the genome ===
Guillardia theta was the first cryptomonad with a complete sequenced genome. Its nucleus is haploid, with a tetraploid nucleomorph and mitochondria and plastids with high copy numbers. Since the original sequencing, the plastid and nucleomorph genome have also been sequenced and mapped to better understand the algal ancestry of the plastid and taxonomic history of the genus. The nuclear genome is approximately 87 mega base pairs in size encoding 21,000 predicted proteins, 57% being completely unique with no known homologs in other organisms. The genome contains almost all eukaryotic complexity hallmarks including endomembrane system, transcription, RNA processing and translation, post translational modification, protein turnover, and cytoskeletal genes. The Guillardia nuclear genome was also found to have many spliceosomal introns, and a large family of putative tyrosine kinases. Of 7451 genes in the Guillardia nucleus, 508 were determined to originate in algal lineages. Despite data suggesting that the majority of these genes originate from green algal lineages, this comparison is not reliable as many genome databases tend to be biased towards green algal genes.

Nucleomorph sequencing reveals a relatively small genome with 487 protein genes, few housekeeping genes, with only 31 genes being targeted to the plastid. It is clear that the nucleomorph has been significantly reduced in size and almost entirely relies on protein targeting to the periplastidial complex. The host nuclear genome codes for transcription associated proteins that presumably act to regulate gene expression in the nucleomorph, as well as DNA replication proteins and protein kinases associated with cell replication. The transfer of these genes to the host genome clearly depicts the loss of self sufficiency of the plastid endosymbiont. However, complete sequencing of both nuclear and nucleomorph genomes indicate that throughout endosymbiont gene transfer, proteins often take on new functions and occupy different compartments, so function cannot be determined based on evolutionary history. Guillardia's genome contains a high level of mosaicism with genes derived from host nucleus, nucleomorph, plastid, and other foreign alga derived proteins.

The plastid genome of Guillardia theta was also the first plastid from a nucleomorph containing organism to be physically mapped and sequenced to elucidate the endosymbiotic origin of the plastid. The genome consists of 121 kilo base pairs, of that 4kbp encode the two rRNA cistrons for ribosomal production. In the coding regions, 46 genes are for photosynthesis, 10 genes are biosynthetic, replication, and division genes, 44 encode ribosomal proteins, and 7 are involved in transcription and translation. Some genes overlap and there are no introns contained within the genome, making it quite compact. Additionally there are many polycistronic genes that are identical to those identified in the plastid of a red alga, Porphyra purpurea. This suggests the common ancestry of the plastid in both Guillardia and Porphyra.

== Practical importance ==
Guillardia has been frequently used as a model cryptomonad for algal endosymbiont genomics and many other cryptomonad studies. Because the genus cultures so well, it was the first cryptomonad to have its entire nuclear, nucleomorph, and plastid genome sequenced. The information gleaned from this data helped to elucidate mechanisms of secondary endosymbiosis present in protist lineages containing endosymbiotic red algal plastids. In addition to molecular sequencing, the replication mechanisms, and photosynthetic mechanisms incorporated in the plastid of Guillardia organisms have been well studied as a model for other cryptophyte species. The genus was also used as a model to study periplast starch synthesis in cryptophytes, demonstrating that the Guillardia theta periplast uses a UDP-glucose based pathway to synthesize starch.

Additionally, anion channelrhodopsin proteins from Guillardia theta have been found to induce neuron hyperpolarization in optogenetic assays. Channelrhodopsins are light gated anion channels that induce flagellar movement towards light sources in algae. In human studies, anion channelrhodopsins can be deployed to induce chloride driven hyperpolarization, silencing targeted neurons at specific timepoints. This allows neuroscientists to study neuronal circuitry by photo-suppressing specific neurons. Before the discovery of anion channelrhodopsins in Guillardia, methods for optogenetic silencing of neurons were less effective and precise. While this discovery continues to be incredibly useful for neuroscience research, further research demonstrated a Rhodomonas salina anion channelrhodopsin to have a decreased response time between stimulation and channel opening. As such, Guillardia channelrhodopsins are no longer used as frequently for neuroscience assays.

Furthermore, it has been used as prey for culturing and study of other organisms, like Mesodinium ciliates.
