= Rhinomonas lateralis =

Scientific classification
- Phylum: Cryptista
- Class: Cryptophyceae
- Order: Pyrenomonadales
- Family: Pyrenomonadaceae
- Genus: Rhinomonas
- Species: R. lateralis

Binomial name
- Rhinomonas lateralis (Butcher) D.R.A.Hill & R.Wetherbee

Species of cryptomonad

Rhinomonas lateralis is a species of cryptomonad given its current designation in 1988.
