= Geminigera =

Scientific classification
- Domain: Eukaryota
- Clade: Pancryptista
- Phylum: Cryptista
- Superclass: Cryptomonada
- Class: Cryptophyceae
- Order: Pyrenomonadales
- Family: Geminigeraceae
- Genus: Geminigera; D.R.A. Hill
- Species: G. cryophila

Binomial name
- Geminigera cryophila (D.L. Taylor & C.C. Lee) D.R.A. Hill

Genus of single-celled organisms

Geminigera /ˌdʒɛmɪnɪˈdʒɛɹə/ is a genus of cryptophyte from the family Geminigeraceae. Named for its unique pyrenoids, Geminigera is a genus with a single mixotrophic species. It was discovered in 1968 and is known for living in very cold temperatures such as under the Antarctic ice. While originally considered to be part of the genus Cryptomonas, the genus Geminigera was officially described in 1991 by D. R. A. Hill.

== Etymology ==
The genus Geminigera was named for its unique paired pyrenoids. The name in Latin means "bearer of twins" and was suggested in the original article that declared the genus separate from Cryptomonas.

== History ==
While the genus Geminigera was originally described in 1991, its type- and only species, Geminigera cryophila, was discovered back in 1968 but was considered to be a member of the genus Cryptomonas collected beneath packed ice in the Weddell Sea of Antarctica and described by D.L. Taylor and C. C. Lee. After further morphological examination in 1991 by D. R. A. Hill, it was determined that the species should be separate from Cryptomonas due to differences in the furrow-gullet system, the structure of the periplast, features of the plastidial complex, and the structure of the rhizostylar flagellar rootlet. This led to a change in the name resulting in Cryptomonas cryophila to be renamed Geminigera cryophila. By 1999, it was determined that the genus no longer belonged in the family Cryptomonadceae but instead in the newly proposed family Geminigeraceae.

== Habitat and ecology ==
Geminigera is a marine species capable of living in extremely cold environments. Originally it was found below sea ice in the Weddell Sea in Antarctica and was later cultured at temperatures between −1.8 and −2 °C. Like other cryptophytes, Geminigera is mixotrophic and feeds both on bacteria in the surrounding environment, and on the sugars produced during the photosynthesis process. The extra sugars are turned into starch granules and are used during times of low light such as in the winter.

== Description of organism ==
Geminigera cryophila is the only known species within Geminigera. Like other cryptophytes, it is surrounded by a finely striated periplast that is lined with small ejectisomes. Cells are between 15–17 μm long, 8–10 μm deep, and 3–5 μm wide with a somewhat irregular profile. They tend to appear slightly flattened and are free swimming organisms. At the anterior end, they are truncated while the posterior end tends to be rounded. At the anterior end there is a medium length furrow and a short sac-like gullet that continues posteriorly to the furrow. There are two flagella erupting from the furrow-gullet system, a feature typical of cryptophytes. These flagella are about 1/2 – the length of the cell itself which is the same for the furrow-gullet. The furrow-gullet is lined with a high number of ejectisomes arranged in 3–5 rows. The cells possess a single plastid with thylakoids in stacks of 2 or more in a red to olive brown colour which is a unique feature to Geminigera. Two pyrenoids are present within the chromatophore and are attached by short stalks to opposite lobes of the plastid. They are kidney-like in shape and are not disrupted by thylakoid stacks. Each pyrenoid is surrounded by a total of 4 membranes. The inner pair form the plastid envelope while the outer pair are continuous with the rough endoplasmic reticulum which is continuous with the nuclear envelope. A defining feature of Geminigera is the presence of the phycobiliprotein Cr-phycoerythrin 545 within the chloroplast. The mitochondria are large in size and come in variable shapes. Geminigera possesses a single Golgi body at the anterior end of the cell as well as several large lipid bodies in the cytoplasm. These lipid bodies give Geminigera its irregular shape and have been suggested to play a role in the survival of the organism in the Antarctic environment, but further research on this topic must be done. The nucleus is at the posterior end of the cell and has a prominent nucleolus. It is often almost split in half by a large invagination containing a portion of the cell's cytoplasm.

Not much research has been done into the reproduction of Geminigera, but the organism has been shown to reproduce asexually by fission. It is unknown if any sexual reproduction occurs within Geminigera or whether it has an alternation of generations like other cryptomonads.

== List of species ==
- Geminigera cryophila (D. L. Taylor and C. C. Lee) D. R. A. Hill 1968
