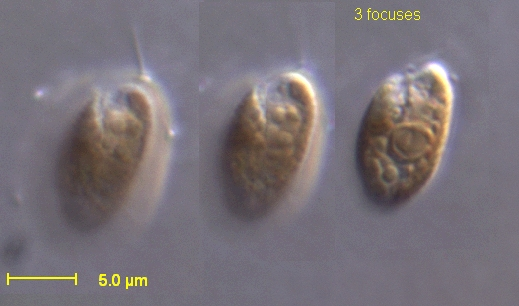
- Rhodomonas salina
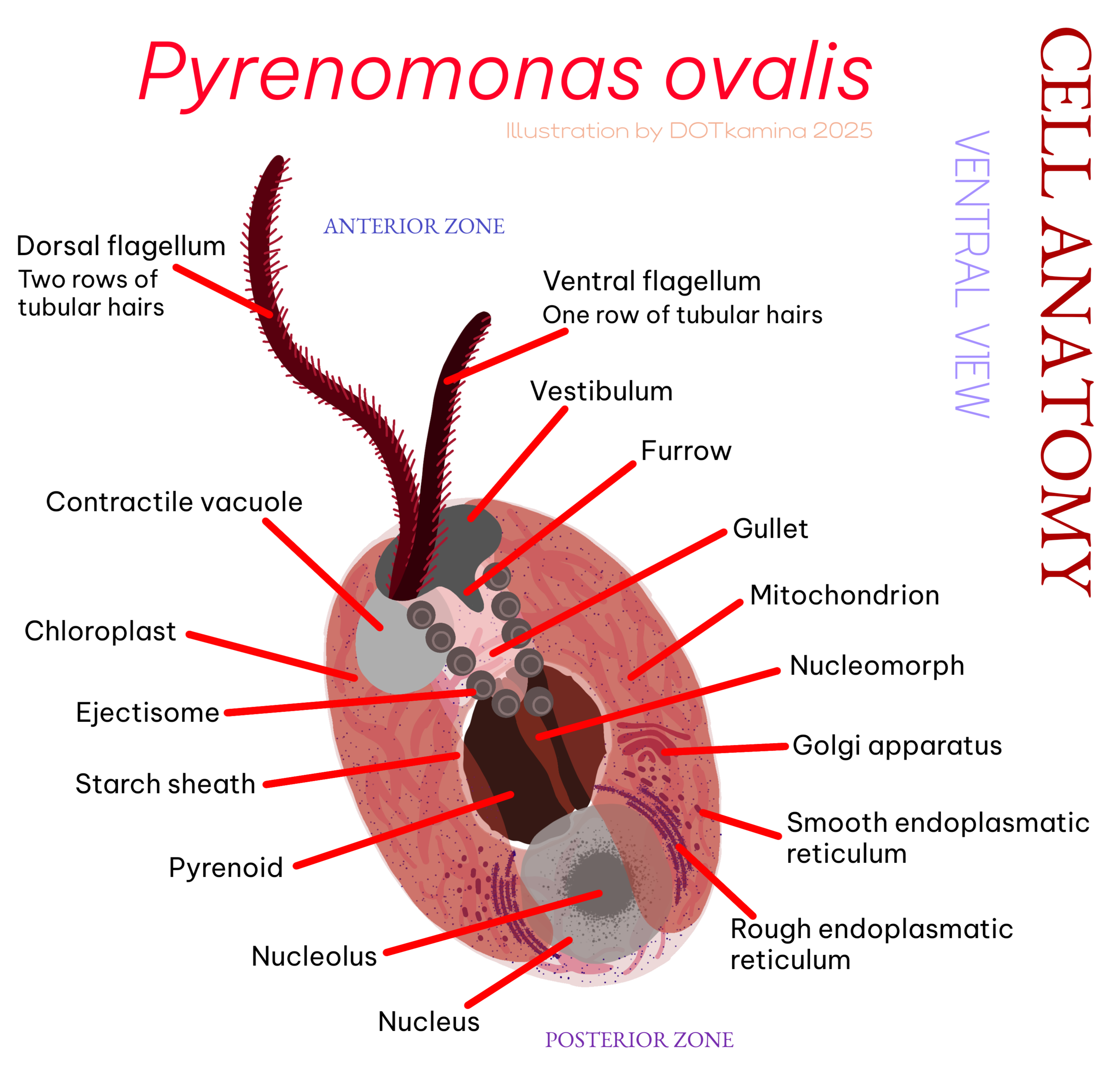
- Pyrenomonas ovalis

Scientific classification
- Domain: Eukaryota
- Clade: Pancryptista
- Phylum: Cryptista
- Superclass: Cryptomonada
- Class: Cryptophyceae
- Order: Pyrenomonadales
- Family: Pyrenomonadaceae; Novarino & Lucas 1993

Type genus
- "Pyrenomonas" (nomen nudum) Santore, 1984

Genera
- "Pyrenomonas" (nomen nudum); Rhinomonas; Rhodomonas; Storeatula

= Pyrenomonadaceae =

Family of cryptomonads

Pyrenomonadaceae is a family of cryptomonads which includes three or four known genera. They are distinguished from other cryptomonads by their nucleomorphs being imbedded into the pyrenoid, and the presence of distinctive pigment phycoerythrin 545.

== Taxonomy ==
Rhodomonas was the first genus within today's Pyrenomonadaceae identified, being described in 1898. For most of the 20th century, all other genera now recognized as Pyrenomonadaceae were placed into various other taxa (ex. Rhinomonas fulva as Cryptochrysis fulva) Adolf Pascher placed Rhodomonas within his subfamily Cryptochrysideae in 1913. Butcher's highly influential 1967 phylogeny of all then-known Cryptophytes did not recognize Rhodomonas, reclassifying all previously described Rhodomonas species as Chroomonas.

Between 1982 and 1986, a series of ultrastructure studies by Uwe J. Santore found considerable morphological inconsistencies within Butcher's Chroomonas, leading him to identify the new genus Pyrenomonas in 1984. Two years later, he revived genus Rhodomonas and proposed the existence of a clade largely consisting of "reddish-brown cryptomonads". Expanding upon Santore's research, in 1988 D.R.A. Hill and R. Wetherbee analyzed various cryptomonads that had been treated as Cryptochrysis by early 20th century researchers. From this they identified several new species of Rhodomonas, and introduced the new genus Rhinomonas. Hill would identify another "reddish-brown cryptomonad" genus in 1991, Storeatula. In 1989, Hill and Wetherbee argued that Rhodomonas was synonymous with Pyrenomonas, triggering an academic debate regarding whether or not each genus should be treated separately. This debate remains unresolved as of 2019.

The earliest reference to Pyrenomonadaceae in an approximately modern sense was made by Gianfranco Novarino and Ian Lucas in their 1993 classification scheme for the Cryptophyceae. In this classification scheme, the family included Rhinomonas and Pyrenomonas. An updated scheme in 1999 added Storeatula as well.

Overall monophyly of the Pyrenomonadaceae has been universally supported by electron-microscope and molecular-based studies in the 1990s and 2000s. A 2002 phylogenic study of 18s rDNA suggested that, while the family itself was monophyletic, Rhodomonas was not, with R. abbreviata forming a clade with Storeatula while all other Rhodomonas species examined formed a clade with Rhinomonas. A more comprehensive phylogenetic study in 2014 largely agreed with and expanded upon earlier findings, presenting a preliminary classification scheme with three unnamed clades.

=== Clay et al, 1999 ===
- Pyrenomonadaceae
  - Rhinomonas
  - Pyrenomonas
  - Storeatula

=== Deane et al, 2002 ===
- "Clade E" Cryptomonads
  - - Rhodomonas sp.
    - - - Rhodomonas maculata
        - Rhodomonas marina
      - Rhinomonas
  - Pyrenomonas
  - - Storeatula
    - Rhodomonas abbreviata

=== Majaneva et al, 2014 ===
- Pyrenomonadaceae
  - - Rhodomonas duplex
    - Rhodomonas marina
    - - Storeatula sp.
      - Rhodomonas abbreviata
  - - - Rhodomonas lens
      - Rhodomonas sp.
    - - Rhodomonas baltica
      - Rhodomonas sp.
  - - - Rhinomonas pauca
      - Storeatula major
    - - Rhinomonas reticulata
      - Rhinomonas nottbecki
