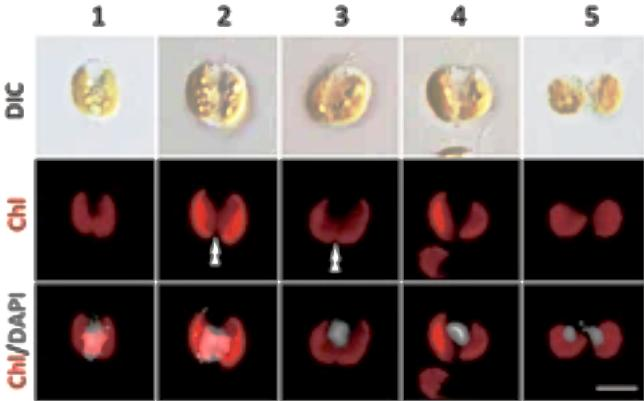
- Guillardia theta. DAPI-staining images showing the representative cells of cell cycle stages based on the localization of the nucleus and the shape of the chloroplast. DIC, images of differential interference contact; Chl, chloroplast autofluorescence; Chl/DAPI, merged images of Chl and DAPI. The double arrowhead indicates constriction of the chloroplast division site. Scale bar = 5 µm

Scientific classification
- Domain: Eukaryota
- Clade: Pancryptista
- Phylum: Cryptista
- Superclass: Cryptomonada
- Class: Cryptophyceae
- Order: Pyrenomonadales
- Family: Geminigeraceae; Clay, Kugrens and Lee, 1999

Type genus
- Geminigera Hill, 1991

Genera
- Geminigera; Guillardia; Hanusia; Proteomonas; Teleaulax; Urgorri

= Geminigeraceae =

Family of single-celled organisms

Geminigeraceae is a family of cryptophytes containing six genera. They are characterised by chloroplasts containing Cr-phycoerythrin 545, and an inner periplast component (IPC) comprising "a sheet or a sheet and multiple plates if diplomorphic". The nucleomorphs are never in the pyrenoid, and there is never a scalariform furrow. The cells do, however, have a long, keeled rhizostyle with lamellae (wings).
