= Tetragonidiaceae =

Scientific classification
- Domain: Eukaryota
- Clade: Pancryptista
- Phylum: Cryptista
- Superclass: Cryptomonada
- Class: Cryptophyceae
- Order: Tetragonidiales; Kristiansen, 1992
- Family: Tetragonidiaceae; Bourrelly ex Silva, 1980

Type genus
- Tetragonidium Pascher, 1914

Genera
- Bjornbergiella; Tetragonidium

Family of algae

Tetragonidiaceae is a family of cryptomonads which includes two genera. Members of Tetragonidiaceae are distinguished from other cryptomonads by reproduction occurring in a non-motile vegetative phase, as well as the formation of multicellular filaments unlike any other cryptomonad family.
