= Pleuromastigaceae =

Scientific classification
- Domain: Eukaryota
- Clade: Pancryptista
- Phylum: Cryptista
- Superclass: Cryptomonada
- Class: Cryptophyceae
- Order: Cryptomonadales
- Family: Pleuromastigaceae; Bourrelly 1970 ex Silva 1980

Genera
- ?Opisthostigma; Pleuromastix; Xanthodiscus

Obsolete family of cryptomonads

Pleuromastigaceae is an obsolete family of cryptomonads, which included genera Monomastix, Pleuromastix, and Xanthodiscus.

Today, Monomastix is regarded as a green alga, and since 1987 Xanthodiscus is regarded as a synonym of Prorocentrum. Pleuromastix remains unclassified as a part of any larger taxon as of 2019.
