= Plagioselmis =

Scientific classification
- Domain: Eukaryota
- Phylum: Cryptista
- Superclass: Cryptomonada
- Class: Cryptophyceae
- Order: Pyrenomonadales
- Family: Geminigeraceae
- Genus: Plagioselmis; Butcher 1967 ex Novarino, Lucas & Morrall 1994

Type species
- Plagioselmis prolonga Butcher 1967 ex Novarino, Lucas & Morrall 1994

Species
- P. lacustris (Pascher & Ruttner 1913) Javornický 2001; P. nannoplanctica (Skuja 1948) Novarino, Lucas & Morrall 1994; P. prolonga Butcher 1967 ex Novarino, Lucas & Morrall 1994; P. pygmaea (Javornický 1976) Javornický 2001

Genus of single-celled organisms

Plagioselmis is a genus of cryptophytes, including the species Plagioselmis punctata.

Plagioselmis was first described by Butcher in 1967 as a saltwater life form. In 1994, Novarino placed the freshwater Rhodomonas minuta into the genus, giving it the new binomial name of Plagioselmis nannoplanctica. P. nannoplanctica is the only freshwater species in this genus. Rhodomonas was first described by Klaveness, who agreed with the reclassification.

The cells are comma-shaped and appear red or similar colors. Some strains within the genus appear to have a furrow, while other do not. Researchers have suggested that those without furrows should be placed into a new genus.
