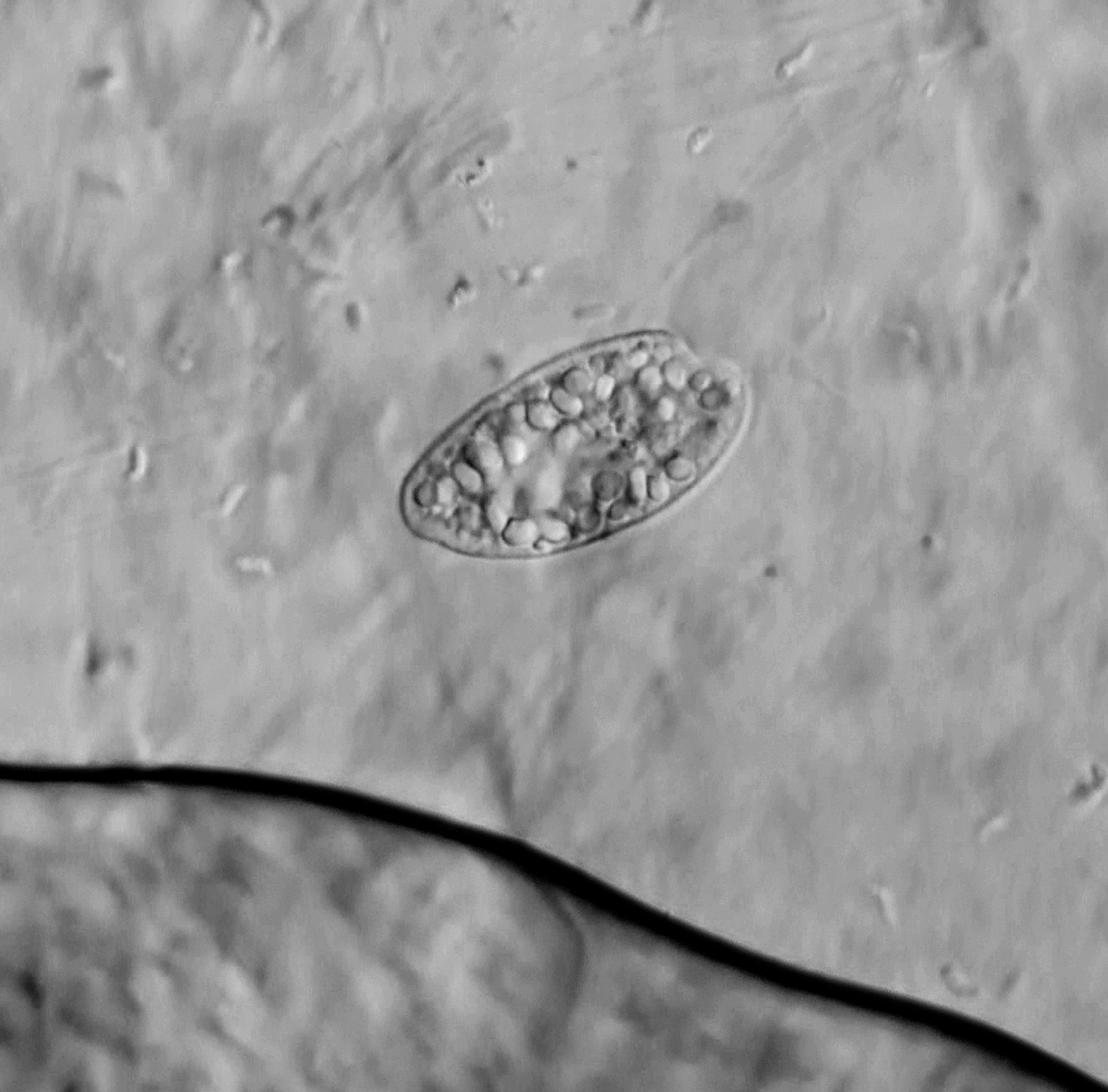

Scientific classification
- Domain: Eukaryota
- Clade: Pancryptista
- Phylum: Cryptista
- Superclass: Cryptomonada
- Class: Cryptophyceae
- Order: Cryptomonadales
- Family: Campylomonadaceae
- Genus: Chilomonas; Ehrenberg ex Ralfs, 1831

Type species
- Chilomonas paramecium Ehrenberg 1831

Synonyms
- Chilomonas (Euchilomonas) Diesing 1850; Chilomonas (Plagiomastix) Diesing 1850; Plagiomastix (Diesing 1850) Diesing 1866

= Chilomonas =

Genus of single-celled organisms

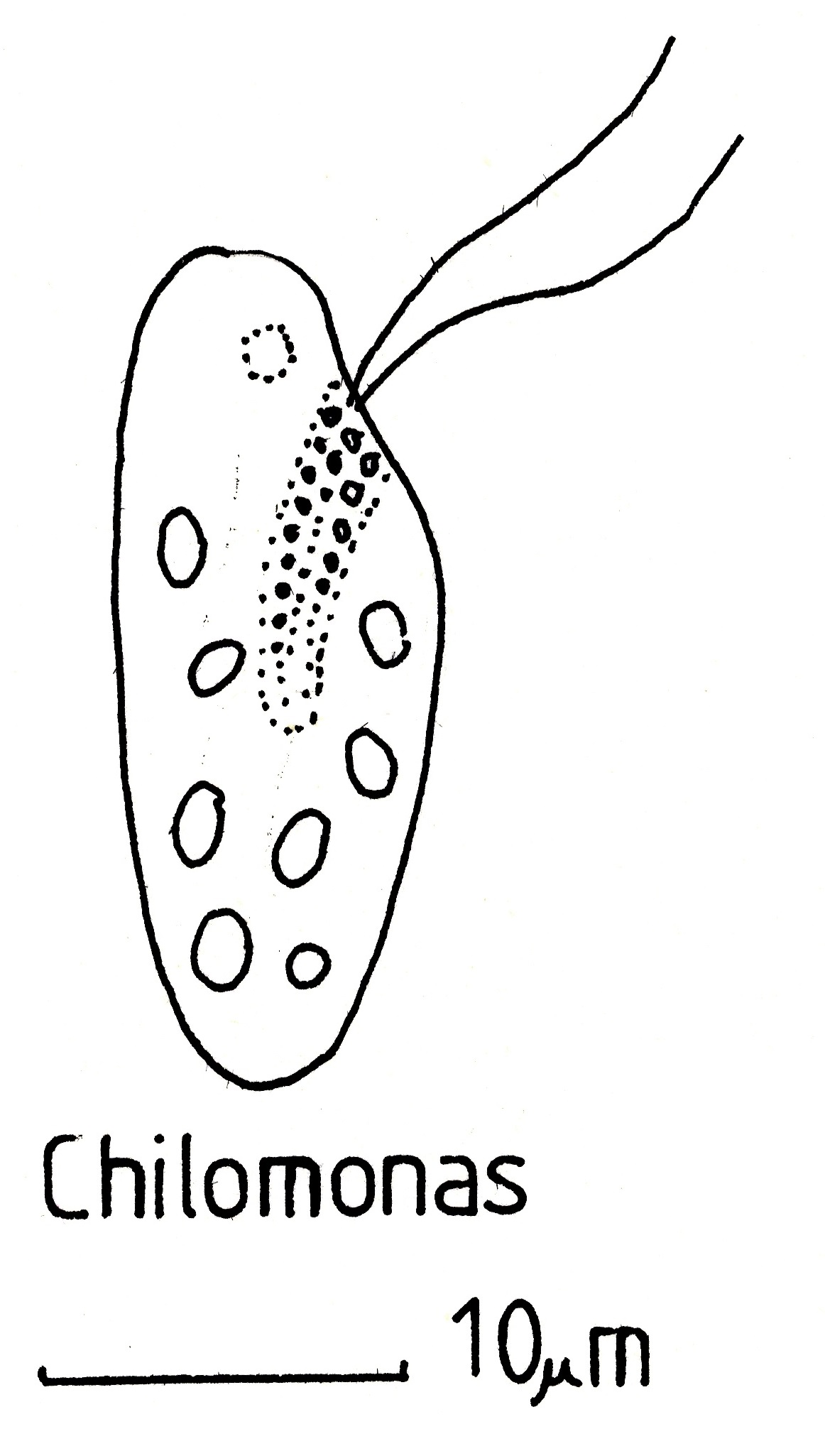
Chilomonas, illustration

Chilomonas is a genus of freshwater cryptophytes, including the species Chilomonas paramecium. Members of this genus are osmotrophic heterotrophs possessing leucoplasts but not pigmented plastids. The periplastidial compartment contains multiple nucleomorphs.
