= Bjornbergiella hawaiiensis =

Scientific classification
- Domain: Eukaryota
- Clade: Pancryptista
- Phylum: Cryptista
- Superclass: Cryptomonada
- Class: Cryptophyceae
- Order: Tetragonidiales
- Family: Tetragonidiaceae
- Genus: Bjornbergiella; Bicudo, 1965
- Species: B. hawaiiensis

Binomial name
- Bjornbergiella hawaiiensis Bicudo, 1965

Species of cryptomonad

Bjornbergiella hawaiiensis is a Hawaiian species of cryptomonad described in 1965. It is the sole member of the genus Bjornbergiella.
