= Butschliellaceae =

Scientific classification
- Domain: Eukaryota
- Clade: Pancryptista
- Phylum: Cryptista
- Superclass: Cryptomonada
- Class: Cryptophyceae
- Order: Cryptomonadales
- Family: Butschliellaceae; Skvortzov, 1968

Type genus
- Butschliella Skvortsov, 1968

Genera
- Butschliella; Skvortzoviella

Family of cryptomonads

Butschliellaceae is a possible family of cryptomonads proposed by Pierre Bourrelly in 1970, to include both the previously described Butschliella and his newly discovered genus Skvortzoviella.
