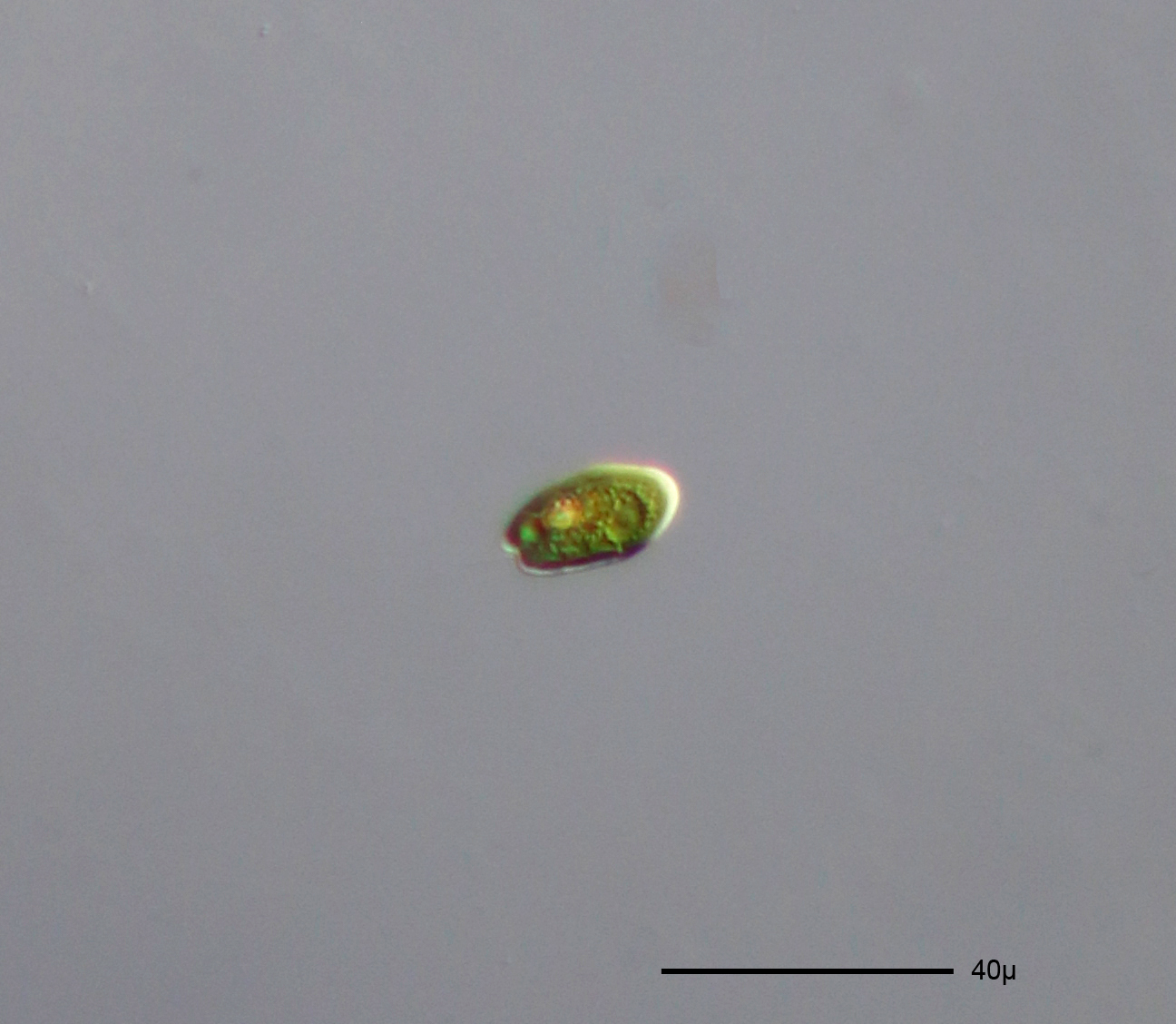
- Cryptomonas platyuris

Scientific classification
- Domain: Eukaryota
- Clade: Pancryptista
- Phylum: Cryptista
- Superclass: Cryptomonada
- Class: Cryptophyceae
- Order: Cryptomonadales; Pascher, 1913

Families
- Baffinellaceae; Butschliellaceae; Cryptochrysidaceae; Cryptomonadaceae; Cyathomonadaceae; Hemiselmidaceae; Hilleaceae

Synonyms
- Cryptomonadida Calaway & Lackey 1962; Eucryptomonadina Calkins 1926; Eucryptomonadineae Diesing 1850

= Cryptomonadales =

Order of single-celled organisms

Cryptomonadales is an order of cryptists containing seven families. One of the older families, Pleuromastigaceae, is no longer accepted and encompasses species now placed in other taxa (such as Mamiellophyceae).
