= Hilleaceae =

Scientific classification
- Domain: Eukaryota
- Clade: Pancryptista
- Phylum: Cryptista
- Superclass: Cryptomonada
- Class: Cryptophyceae
- Order: Cryptomonadales
- Family: Hilleaceae; Pascher, 1967

Genera
- Calkinsiella; Hillea

Family of cryptomonads

Hilleaceae was one of the three families of cryptomonads proposed by R.W. Butcher in 1967, who included only the genus Hillea. It has appeared in at least two other cryptomonad classification systems since then. However, as Hillea has yet to be successfully cultured, its validity as a genus (and by extension, the validity of Hilleaceae) remains uncertain. The family also includes Calkinsiella.
