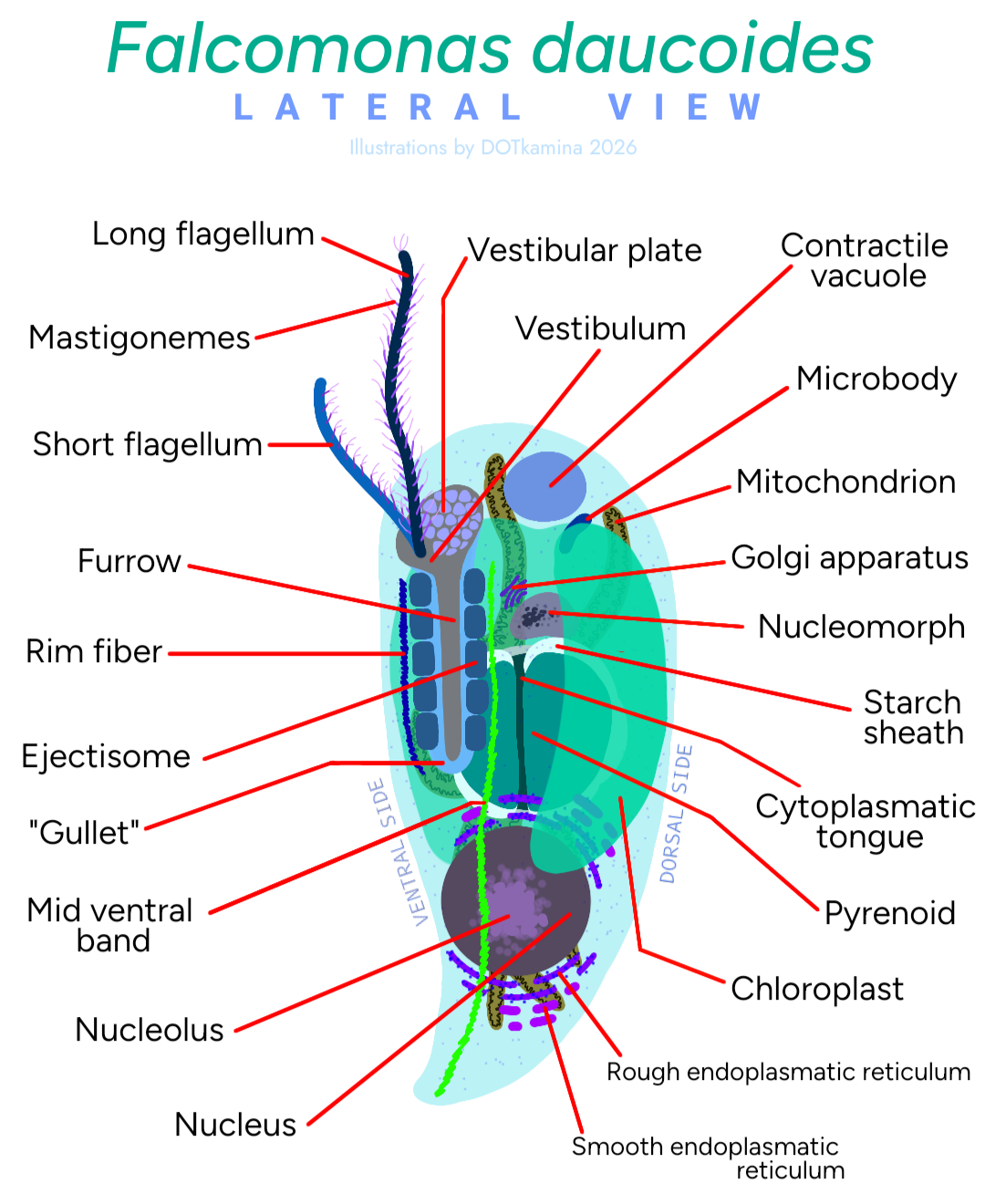

Scientific classification
- Domain: Eukaryota
- Clade: Pancryptista
- Phylum: Cryptista
- Superclass: Cryptomonada
- Class: Cryptophyceae
- Order: Pyrenomonadales
- Family: Falcomonadaceae
- Genus: Falcomonas; Hill 1991

Type species
- Falcomonas daucoides (Conrad & Kufferath 1954) Hill 1991

Species
- F. daucoides (Conrad & Kufferath 1954) Hill 1991

= Falcomonas =

Genus of single-celled organisms

Falcomonas is a genus of cryptophytes placed in the family Chroomonadaceae. It is a common organism in marine waters.
