= Storeatula =

Scientific classification
- Domain: Eukaryota
- Phylum: Cryptista
- Superclass: Cryptomonada
- Class: Cryptophyceae
- Order: Pyrenomonadales
- Family: Pyrenomonadaceae
- Genus: Storeatula; Hill, 1991

Type species
- Storeatula major Butcher, 1967 ex Hill, 1991

Species
- S. major Butcher, 1967 ex Hill, 1991; S. rhinosa Kugrens, Clay & Lee, 1999

Genus of single-celled organisms

Storeatula is a genus of cryptophytes.

It includes the species Storeatula major.
