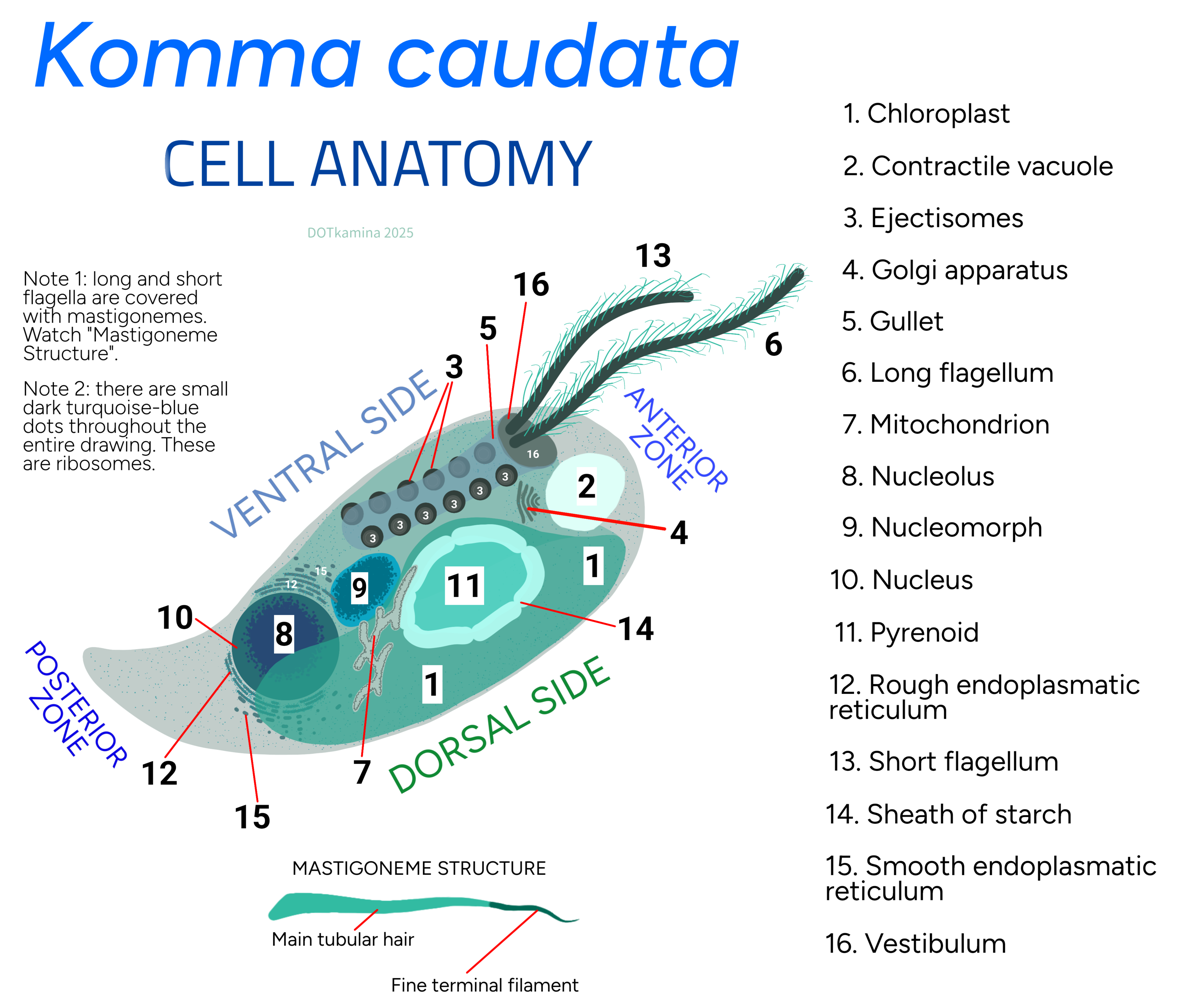

Scientific classification
- Domain: Eukaryota
- Clade: Pancryptista
- Phylum: Cryptista
- Superclass: Cryptomonada
- Class: Cryptophyceae
- Order: Pyrenomonadales
- Family: Chroomonadaceae
- Genus: Komma; D. R. A. Hill, 1991
- Species: K. caudata

Binomial name
- Komma caudata (L. Geitler) D. R. A. Hill

Synonyms
- Chroomonas acuta Utermöhl, 1925

= Komma caudata =

Species of single-celled organism

Komma caudata is a cryptomonad, and the only described species in the genus Komma, although four or five more species may exist. Its cells are 4.5–5.5 μm wide by 7–10 μm long and bear two unequal flagella.

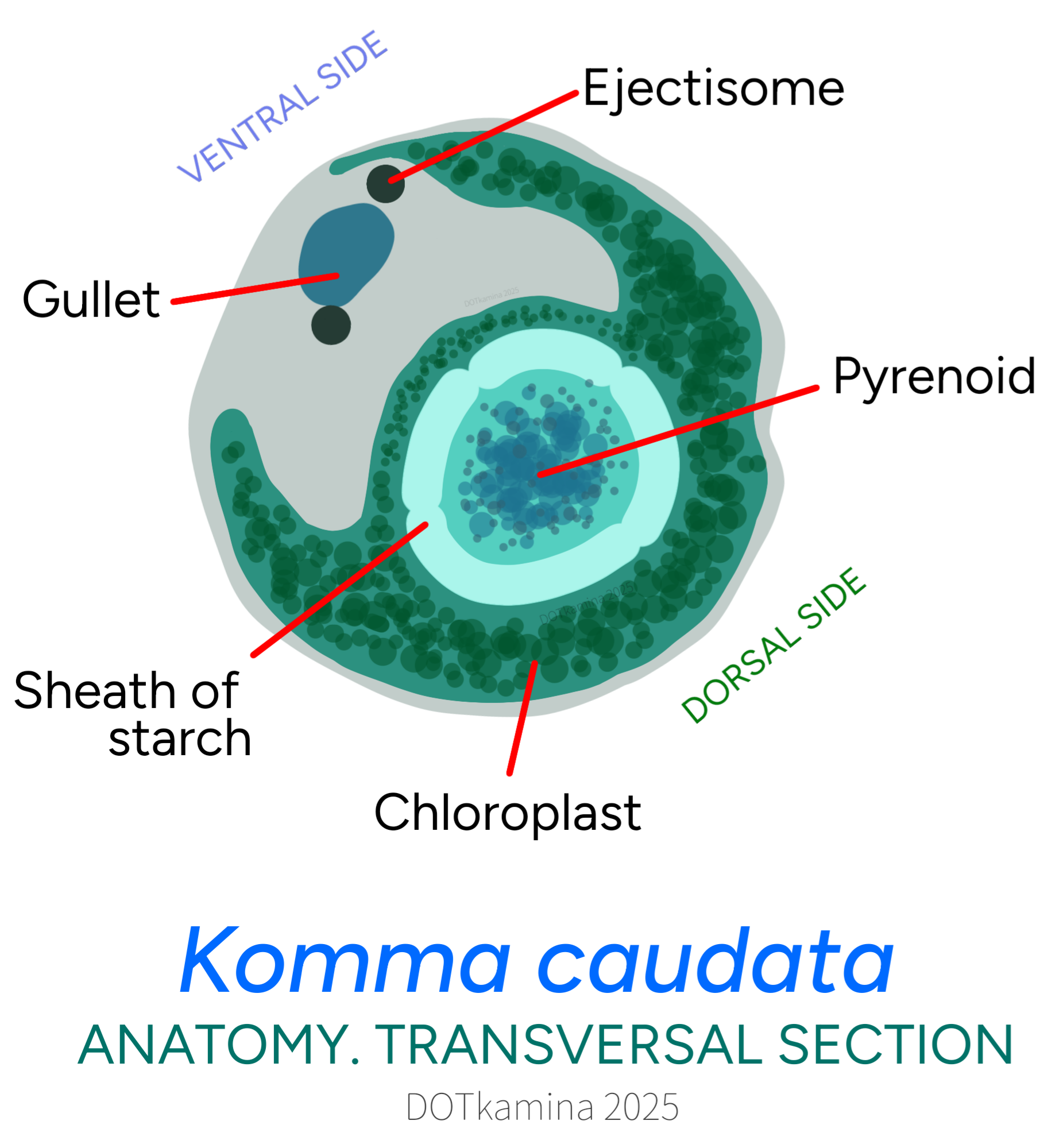
Transversal section of Komma caudata

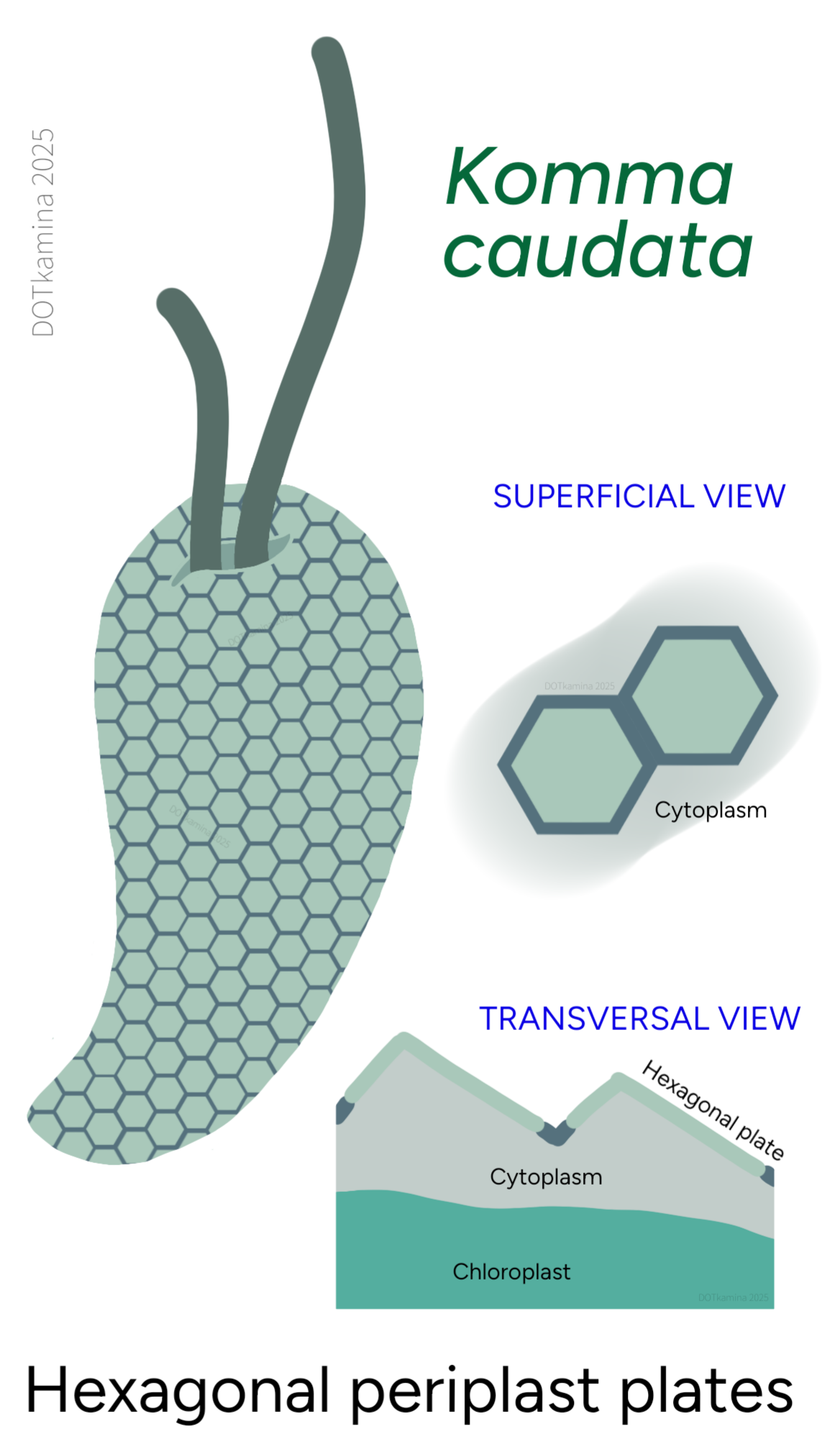
Periplast of Komma caudata
