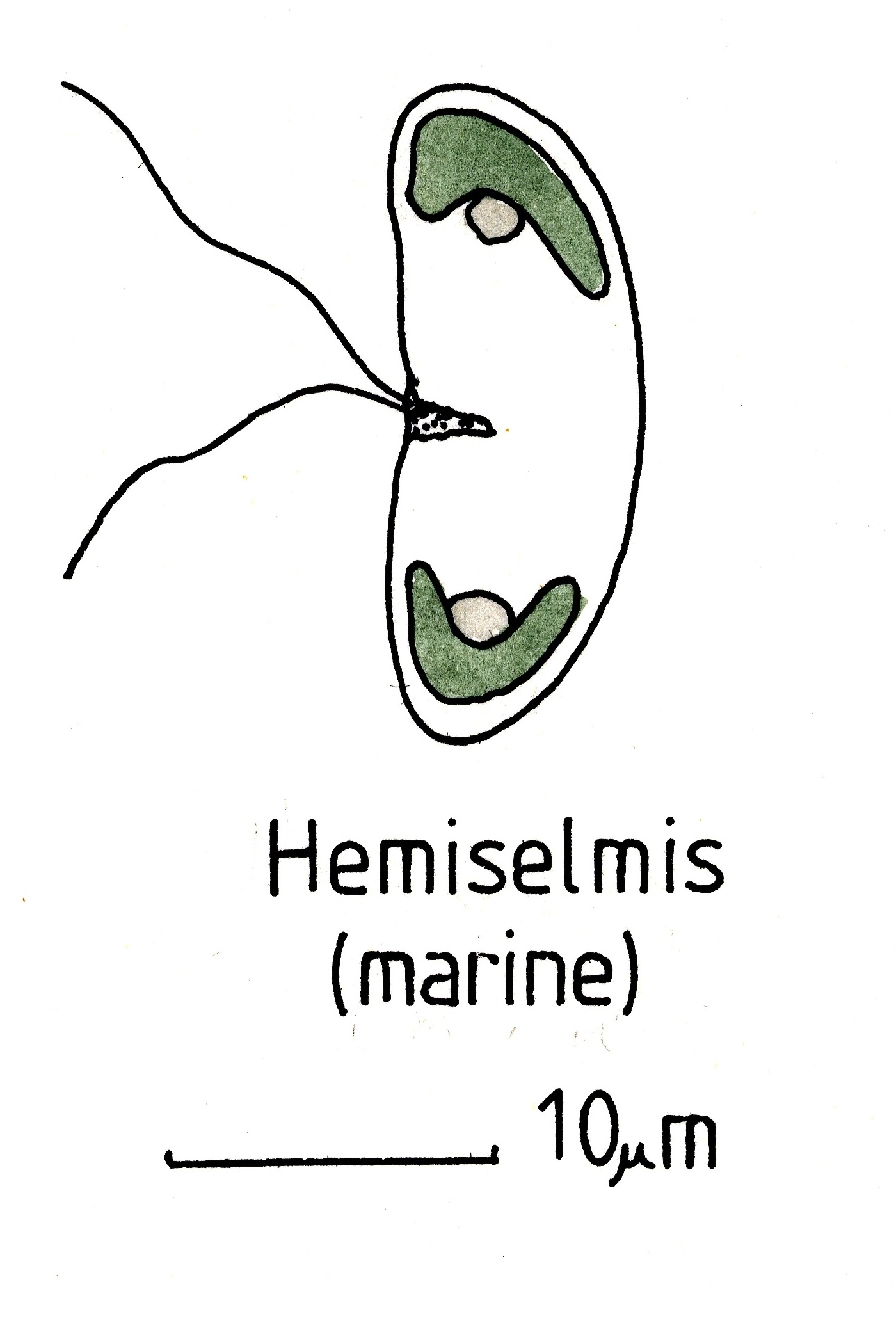
- Hemiselmis, illustration

Scientific classification
- Domain: Eukaryota
- Clade: Pancryptista
- Phylum: Cryptista
- Superclass: Cryptomonada
- Class: Cryptophyceae
- Order: Pyrenomonadales
- Family: Hemiselmidaceae
- Genus: Hemiselmis; Parke 1949

Type species
- Hemiselmis rufescens Parke 1949

Synonyms
- Sennia Skuja 1948 non Pascher 1912 non De Stefani 1907

= Hemiselmis =

Genus of single-celled organisms

Hemiselmis is a genus of cryptomonads.

== History of discovery ==
It was first described by English biologist Mary Parke in 1949. She also described the first species in this genus, Hemiselmis rufescens.

== Morphology ==
Hemiselmis are typically 4 to 9 micrometers long, free-swimming, biflagellate monads. They are generally bean-shaped with the flagella located between 1/3 and 1/2 the cell length from the anterior. A tubular gullet lined with usually two rows of ejectisomes is found to be in the posterior region of the cell. A single plastid and nucleomorph are present, with it possessing the biliprotein pigment Cr-phycoerythrin 555 or one of Cr-phycocyanin, 577, 612 and 630. For example, Hemiselmis pacifica possesses Cr-PC577, and Cr-PC612 is found in Hemiselmis virescens and Hemiselmis tepida. The chloroplasts are red in color.

The species has periplast surrounding the cells below plasma membrane. The periplast consists of internal and superficial plates that have a general shape of hexagons. The ultrastructure of several species is well known. The periplast of H. brunnescens has crystalline plates and an unusual secondary layer composed of small "sausage-like" fibrils. The nucleomorph is located outside the pyrenoid between the pyrenoid and the nucleus. The flagella are covered with a layer of fibrillary scales overlapping with each other. Serial reconstruction has shown that there is only one mitochondrion per cell.

== Reproduction ==
Reproduction is only known by asexual reproduction. Species of Hemiselmis remain motile even while dividing.

== Movement ==
Hemiselmis species may easily be overlooked in samples due to their small size and rapid movement, but can be recognized by the special corkscrew swimming motion. It is concluded that the spiral swimming is not because of the irregularity in length or structure of flagella, but because of the dorsoventral flattening of its body. Also, the fact that the flagella are attached at a low point near posterior contributed to the unique swimming pattern observed.

== Ecology ==
Species are generally found in oceanic or coastal marine waters. They are also found in freshwater environment. They are found in a variety of locations on Earth. The locations include Baltic Sea, Caribbean Sea and Isle of Man. Specific temperature ranges and depths to find these species are still not yet classified.

== Nucleomorph genome ==
The nucleomorph genome of H. rufescens has been studied quite thoroughly. Using pulsed-field gel electrophoresis (PFGE), size of the H. rufescens nucleomorph genome was estimated to be 580 kb.

The most significant discovery so far is the complete sequence of nucleomorph genome of Hemiselmis andersenii. The size of the genome is 0.572 Mbp. The nucleomorph genome shows a complete intron loss, with no spliceosomal introns and genes for splicing RNAs. It is suggested that evolution has driven the loss of introns and modified the shape and function of proteins; minimal functional units are needed to maintain basic eukaryotic cellular processes.

== List of species ==
There are currently 16 identified species. Of the 16 species, 14 are accepted taxonomically. Currently, Hemiselmis brunnescens and Hemiselmis cyclopea have unknown status.

A complete list is added below.

- Hemiselmis amylifera Butcher, 1967
- Hemiselmis amylosa Clay & Kugrens, 1999
- Hemiselmis andersenii Lane & Archibald, 2008
- Hemiselmis anomala Butcher, 1967
- Hemiselmis brunnescens Butcher, 1967
- Hemiselmis cryptochromatica Lane & Archibald, 2008
- Hemiselmis cyclopea Butcher, 1967
- Hemiselmis oculata Butcher, 1967
- Hemiselmis pacifica Lane & Archibald, 2008
- Hemiselmis parvula (Skuja) Butcher, 1967
- Hemiselmis rotunda Butcher, 1967
- Hemiselmis rufescens Parke, 1949
- Hemiselmis simplex Butcher, 1967
- Hemiselmis tepida Lane & Archibald, 2008
- Hemiselmis vinosa (Conrad) Chrétiennot-Dinet, 1990
- Hemiselmis virescens Droop, 1955
