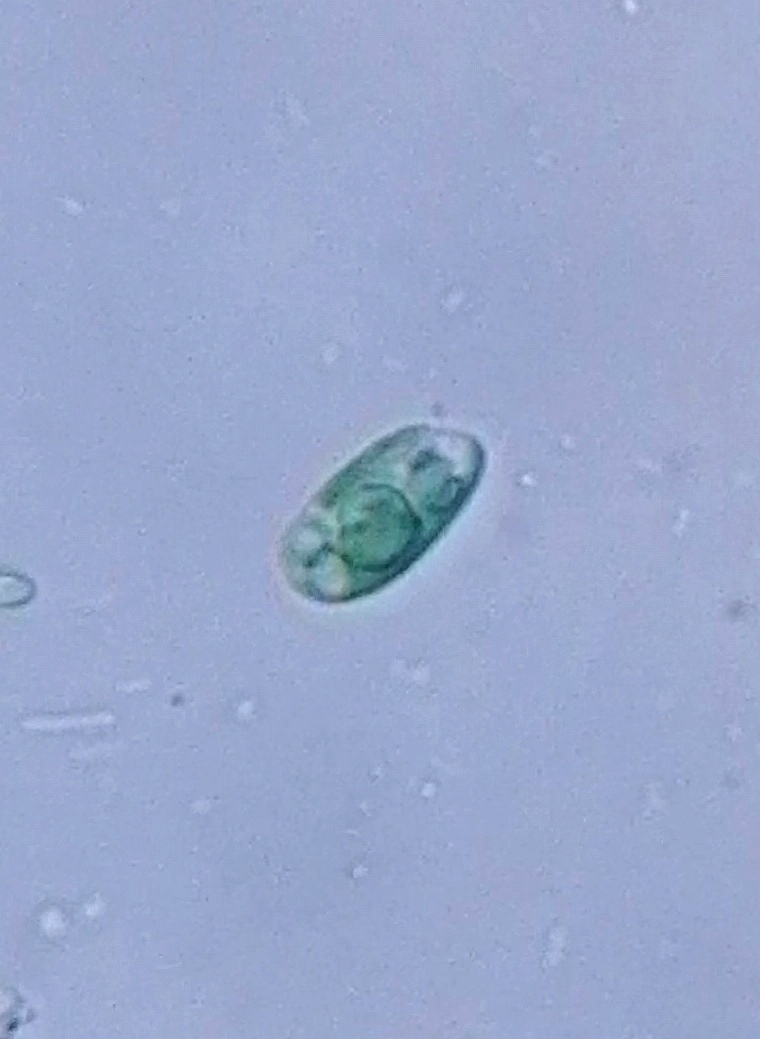
- Chroomonas sp.

Scientific classification
- Domain: Eukaryota
- Clade: Pancryptista
- Phylum: Cryptista
- Superclass: Cryptomonada
- Class: Cryptophyceae
- Order: Pyrenomonadales
- Family: Chroomonadaceae
- Genus: Chroomonas; Hansgirg, 1885

Type species
- Chroomonas nordstedtii Hansgirg, 1885

Synonyms
- Cyanomonas Büttner 1911, non Oltmanns, 1904; Diplotricha Ehrenberg, 1838 ex Ehrenberg ,1866; Cryptomonas (Diplotricha) (Ehrenberg, 1838) Diesing, 1850

= Chroomonas =

Genus of single-celled organisms

Chroomonas is a genus of cryptophytes first described by Anton Hansgirg. It includes the species Chroomonas elegans, Chroomonas placoidea, Chroomonas baltica, Chroomonas guttula and Chroomonas vectensis.
