= Phia =

Phia is a feminine given name. Notable people with the name include:

- Phia Andersson, Swedish politician
- Phia Berghout, Dutch harpist
- Phia Ménard, French juggler, performance artist, and director
- Phia Saban, English actress

== See also ==
- Phia Sing, Laotian royal chef and master of ceremonies
- Philips, whose stock ticker is PHIA
