= Extrusome =

Organelles in eukaryotic cells, capable of discharging material

Extrusomes are membrane-bound organelles found in eukaryotic cells that are capable of discharging material contained within to the exterior of the cell. Due to the diversity in structure and function, it is unlikely that different types of extrusomes are homologous.

Some notable extrusomes include mucocysts, which discharge a mucous mass sometimes used in cyst formation, and trichocysts, which discharge a fibrous rod. Nematocysts, the stinging structure found in Cnidarian animals, could be considered extrusomes as well, though those functions are performed by differentiated cells rather than organelles. Other extrusomes include the ancoracyst, a specialized extrusome found in the Provoran eukaryote Ancoracysta twista used to immobilize prey.

Extrusomes and their functions are currently not well understood; many of their supposed functions are in doubt.

== Function ==
=== Ciliates ===
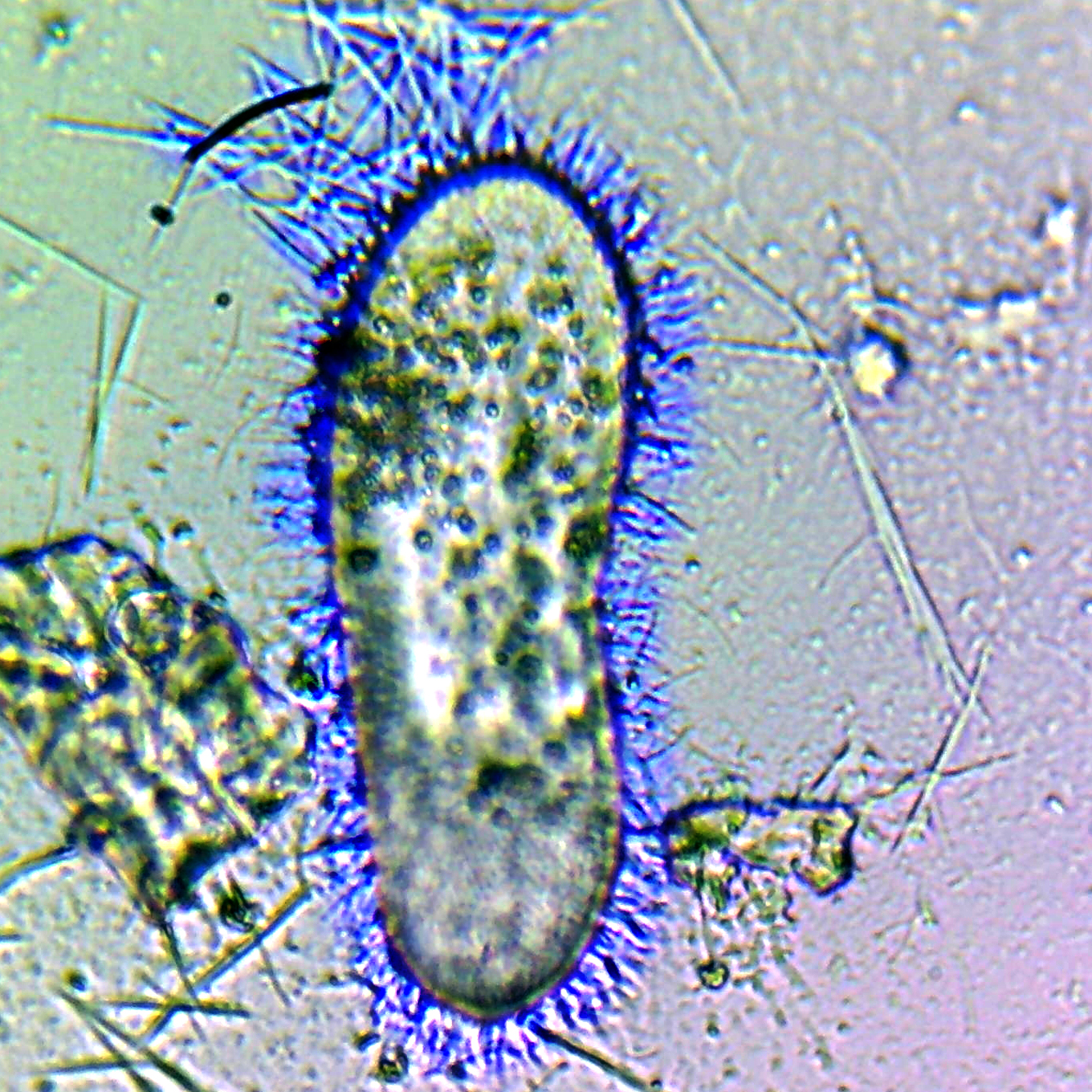
Paramecium tetraurelia, a ciliate, with discharged trichocysts (artificially colored in blue).

Within the ciliates group, numerous extrusomes–primarily trichocysts–are distributed all across the body. In Paramecium, there was found to be approximately 8000 extrusome structures per cell. Each of these structures is capable of responding to external mechanical or physical stimuli, upon which the structure will rapidly eject a sharp projectile to serve as a defense mechanism. Expulsion of the trichocyst is generated by a change in the structure of proteins within the shaft of the projectile that drastically increases its length.

Predatory ciliates in the classes Prostomatea and Litostomatea have a type of extrusome called a toxicyst. As their name suggests, when extruded, the toxicyst will release toxic material to inhibit the ciliate’s prey. Haptocysts are found in the class Phyllopharyngea and are found at the tips of feeding tentacles. Prey caught by the tentacles will be held in place when the extrusome injects its contents into it, pinning it in place and releasing enzymes to break the prey down.

Mucocysts are found in ciliates and flagellates. They secrete a mucus directly onto the cell surface that often leads to the formation of cysts. This additional layer may serve as a barrier against foreign substances; it may also be re-ingested alongside any organic matter that was captured within.

=== In other groups ===
Similar to ciliates, most dinoflagellates have trichocysts capable of ejecting a sharp spindle. Though long believed to be genetically dissimilar, recent studies of ribosomal DNA have yielded evidence towards them being more related despite the physiological differences.

Cryptomonads, a group of algae, have a type of extrusomes referred to as ejectosomes. These structures have two connected spiral ribbon-like structures held under tension. When placed under stress, whether mechanical, chemical, or light, the ejectosome will discharge, propelling the protist away from the disturbance.

Cnidocyst, the organelle associated with the stinging cnidocyte cells of jellyfish and other Cnidarians, are another type of extrusome. When the hair-like trigger called the cnidocil receives a chemical or mechanical input, the coiled hollow tube within is ejected, piercing and injecting the target organism with toxin. The time it takes for the entire process to occur is only a few microseconds, and has been measured to reach an acceleration of approximately 40,000 g.
