= Rhinomonas =

Scientific classification
- Domain: Eukaryota
- Phylum: Cryptista
- Superclass: Cryptomonada
- Class: Cryptophyceae
- Order: Pyrenomonadales
- Family: Pyrenomonadaceae
- Genus: Rhinomonas; D.R.A.Hill & Wetherbee, 1988

Type species
- Rhinomonas pauca Hill & Wetherbee, 1988

Species
- R. fragarioides (Butcher, 1967) Hill & Wetherbee, 1988; R. fulva (Butcher, 1952) Hill & Wetherbee, 1988; R. lateralis (Butcher, 1952) Hill & Wetherbee, 1988; R. nottbeckii Rintala et al., 2014; R. pauca Hill & Wetherbee, 1988; R. reticulata (Lucas, 1968) Novarino, 1991

Genus of single-celled organisms

Rhinomonas is a genus of cryptophytes.

It includes the species Rhinomonas pauca.
