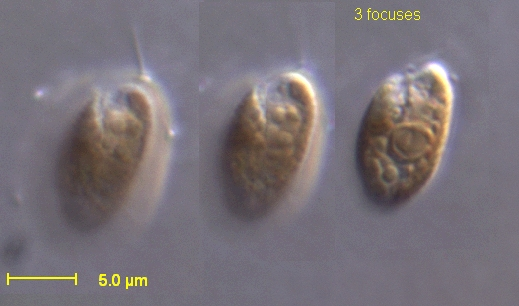
- Rhodomonas salina

Scientific classification
- Domain: Eukaryota
- Phylum: Cryptista
- Superclass: Cryptomonada
- Class: Cryptophyceae
- Order: Pyrenomonadales
- Family: Pyrenomonadaceae
- Genus: Rhodomonas; Karsten, 1898

Type species
- Rhodomonas baltica Karsten, 1898

= Rhodomonas =

Genus of single-celled organisms

Rhodomonas is a genus of cryptomonads. It is characterized by its red colour, the square-shaped plates of its inner periplast, its short furrow ending in a gullet, and a distinctly shaped chloroplast closely associated with its nucleomorph. Historically, Rhodomonas was characterized by its red chloroplast alone, but this no longer occurs as its taxonomy has become increasingly based on molecular and cellular data. Currently, there is some debate about the taxonomic validity of Rhodomonas as a genus and further research is needed to verify its taxonomic status. Rhodomonas is typically found in marine environments, although freshwater reports exist. It is commonly used as a live feed for various aquaculture species.

== History ==
=== Discovery ===
Rhodomonas was first described by G. Karsten in 1898 as a “strange, swimming organism”. The first indication of Rhodomonas’ existence was Karsten's observation of its proliferation in a sample containing diatoms, seashells, stones, and the brown algae Sphacelaria. Subsequently, Karsten established Rhodomonas baltica as the type species of the genus Rhodomonas. Karsten observed that Rhodomonas contained a red chloroplast, two posteriorly-oriented flagella originating from an anterior gullet, and a large nucleus in the middle of the cell. At the time of discovery, red flagellates were previously unknown and colour was used as the identifying feature of Rhodomonas. After discovery, there were multiple additions to the genus, including those by Lemmermann, Lohmann, Kylin, and Carter. Zimmermann later identified Karsten's “nucleus” as the cell's pyrenoid, based on its characteristic position within the cytoplasm.

=== Taxonomic status ===
Presently, there is criticism against retention of Rhodomonas as a genus. Given that current taxonomy for cryptomonads is based on cellular structures and Karsten did not describe those structures in the original study, some argue that it is impossible to verify if an organism matches Karsten's original sample at an ultrastructural level. Consequently, this raises doubt as to whether an organism that is placed in Rhodomonas truly belongs in that genus. With this perspective, there is support to transfer members of Rhodomonas to the synonymous genus Pyrenomonas. A countering argument is that Rhodomonas has historical priority as it was established before Pyrenomonas, and should continue to be used when referring to this genus. Currently, there is no definite resolution to this debate, and Rhodomonas and Pyrenomonas are used as synonyms. This is demonstrated in recent molecular phylogenies of cryptomonads, where it is established that Rhodomonas and Pyrenomonas are synonymous.

Notably, in recent phylogenies based on molecular data, the genera Rhodomonas, Rhinomonas, and Storeatula are all grouped together based on shared similarity of the examined genetic sequences. Given how closely related these genera are, there is some uncertainty as to how distinct the genus Rhodomonas is from Rhinomonas and Storeatula. Dimorphism has been reported in cryptomonads and is hypothesized to apply to many genera, such that some currently existing genera may actually be different morphs of one group. Applying this to the context of Rhodomonas, the genus Storeatula has been suggested to be a possible alternating morphotype for Rhinomonas and Rhodomonas due to mixing of the three groups in molecular phylogenies. Further investigation is needed to better support these findings.

== Habitat and ecology ==
Rhodomonas resides in marine environments across the globe, with some reports of freshwater species. The first recorded sample of Rhodomonas was taken by G. Karsten from the Kieler Fjord of the Baltic Sea. The ideal temperature range of Rhodomonas in a natural environment is reported to be 9-10°C. Like many other cryptomonads, Rhodomonas species are photosynthetic. It is currently unknown if they are capable of heterotrophy.

== Morphology ==
The size of Rhodomonas species has been reported as ranging from 9-40 𝜇m, with variability between researcher reports. Rhodomonas are motile cells, attributed to the presence of two flagella extending at the anterior end of the cell that allow them to swim. They are oval-shaped, with a shortened anterior end and rounded posterior end.

The periplast, or cell covering, of Rhodomonas is made up of internal and external components. The external component of the periplast is made up of a coarse, intertwining fibril network that is characteristic of Rhodomonas. The internal periplast component consists of small square-shaped plates arranged in longitudinal rows. To accommodate the ejectisomes of the gullet in Rhodomonas, the anterior edges of the internal periplast plates are slightly raised. The posterior edges of the internal periplast plates taper towards the posterior end of the cell and attach to the cell membrane. The corners of the internal periplast plates are beveled.

Rhodomonas cells can appear red, brown, or golden-brown in colour due to the concentration of the red pigment phycoerythrin 545 in their chloroplasts. The pigment is located in the lumen surface of the thylakoid membrane within the chloroplast. Within the cell, the chloroplast is found within the plastidial compartment and has close structural association with the pyrenoid. The chloroplast has two lobes and is shaped like the letter H. The pyrenoid sits between the two lobes of the chloroplast, surrounded by starch. The thylakoids of the chloroplast are unable to penetrate through the pyrenoidal matrix, and consequently do not cross through the pyrenoid. Rhodomonas usually contains one chloroplast, although rare reports with the observation of two chloroplasts exist.

The vestibulum-furrow-gullet system is a defining characteristic of Rhodomonas. The vestibulum is located below the anterior apex of the cell, from which two flagella extend as is characteristic of cryptomonads. The vestibulum transforms posteriorly into a furrow that closes into a gullet. The gullet is short and tubular, while the furrow can vary in length depending on the species. The gullet is lined with ejectisomes that eject substances outside of the cell.

The nucleomorph of Rhodomonas sits in an indentation of the periplastidial cytoplasm into the pyrenoid. This has also been termed as the pyrenoidal bridge. This trait is shared with Rhinomonas and Storeatula, other genera that are often grouped with Rhodomonas .

Rhodomonas also contains a single nucleus, located posteriorly within the cell. In the opposite direction, a contractile vacuole is located near the anterior apex of the cell.

Like many other cryptomonads, Rhodomonas reproduces through asexual division. It is not currently known if they are capable of sexual reproduction.

== Aquaculture ==
Rhodomonas species have been identified as a beneficial feed in aquaculture. Among other organisms, they are ideal for feeding copepods, brine shrimps, and scallop larvae. Their benefits as live feed for aquaculture can be attributed to their high fatty acid and protein content, which increases their nutritional content. It has been observed that under nitrogen starvation conditions, their nutritional content can increase.

== Species ==
The genus Rhodomonas includes the following species:

- Rhodomonas abbreviata Butcher 1967 ex Hill & Wetherbee 1989
- Rhodomonas atrorosea _{Butcher ex Hill & Wetherbee 1989}
- Rhodomonas baltica Karsten 1898
- Rhodomonas chrysoidea Butcher 1967 ex Hill & Wetherbee 1989
- Rhodomonas duplex Hill & Wetherbee 1989
- Rhodomonas falcata (Butcher 1967) Hill & Wetherbee 1989
- ?Rhodomonas gracilis Schiller 1925
- ?Rhodomonas helgolandii (Santore)
- Rhodomonas heteromorpha Butcher 1967 ex Hill & Wetherbee 1989
- ?Rhodomonas irregularis Butcher 1967 ex Chihara 1989
- Rhodomonas lens Pascher & Ruttner 1913
- Rhodomonas maculata Butcher 1967 ex Hill & Wetherbee 1989
- Rhodomonas marina (Dangeard 1892) Lemmermann 1899
- Rhodomonas ovalis Nygaard 1950
- Rhodomonas pusilla _{(Bachman 1923) Javornicky 1967}
- Rhodomonas radix Javornický 2001
- Rhodomonas rubra Geitler 1921
- ?Rhodomonas ruttneri Schiller 1925
- Rhodomonas salina (Wislouch 1924) Hill & Wetherbee 1989
- Rhodomonas stigmatica (Wislouch 1924) Hill 1991
- Rhodomonas tenuis Skuja 1948
