= Periplast =

The periplast is one of three types of cell-covering of three classes of algae. The cryptomonads have the periplast covering. The Dinophyceae have a type called the amphiesma, and the Euglena covering is the pellicle.

== Structure ==
The periplast is a proteinaceous covering. It can be subdivided into an inner periplast and an outer periplast. Both of these components are variable in their composition.

The inner periplast may be formed as a single sheet as in the Chilomonas paramecium, or as multiple plates of varying shape. The outer periplast surrounds the plasma membrane. The inner periplast below the plasma membrane may sometimes as in Komma caudata have a hexagonal arrangement of superficial periplast plates, and these are made up of sub-units.

The superficial plates are lined up exactly with the inner plate and are surrounded by crystalline borders with the occasional rosette scale on the surface of the plates. A number of different periplast arrangements have been described in cryptomonads. On the inner periplast part there may be seen intermembrane particles that penetrate the plasma membrane into the protoplasm. These intermembrane particles are larger around the plate boundaries.

The Dinophyceae has a cell covering called the amphiesma–cisternae-like vesicles in a thecal form structure. Many of the dinoflagellates have thicker thecal plates giving them the name of armoured dinoflagellates. The covering of the Euglenids is called the pellicle.
