= Adolf Pascher =

Czechoslovak botanist

Adolf Alois Pascher (31 May 1881 – 7 May 1945) was a Bohemian botanist and phycologist, notable for his descriptions of several new genera of algae, protists, and vascular plants.

== Biography ==
Born in Stožec, Pascher was the son of a teacher, attended the Gymnasium in Krummau and studied natural science at the German University in Prague, from which he received a doctorate in 1905, and graduated in 1909. In 1908, in partnership with Viktor Langhans, he co-founded a Hydrobiological Laboratory in Hirschberg. In 1912 he became an associate professor of Herbalism and Cryptogamic Botany, later being promoted to Full Professor in 1927. In 1933, he became Director of the Botanical Institutes and Botanical Gardens at the German University in Prague. He served as the editor for Beihefte zum Botanischen Centralblatt for the last twenty years of his life.

A German nationalist, he joined the Sudeten German Party in 1938, and following the German Occupation of Czechoslovakia, actively collaborated with the Nazi regime. He committed suicide on 7 May 1945, three days after the end of World War II.
