= Ejectosome =

An ejectosome is a cellular organelle responsible for ejecting their contents from the cell. Two unrelated types of ejectosomes are described in the literature:

1. Cryptomonads have two types of characteristic extrusomes known as ejectosomes.
2. Intracellular pathogens, such as Mycobacterium tuberculosis, escape from their host cells using an actin-based structure, also called an ejectosome.

Cryptomonad ejectosomes contain two connected spiral ribbon-like structures, held under tension. If the cells are irritated either by mechanical, chemical or light stress, they discharge, propelling the cell in a zig-zag course away from the disturbance. Large ejectisomes, visible under the light microscope, are associated with the pocket; smaller ones occur elsewhere on the cell.

Mycobacteria are ejected from host cells through the action of an actin-based ejectosome. This escape mechanism requires a cytoskeleton regulator from the host plus an intact mycobacterial ESX-1 secretion system. Ejectosomes apparently exert a contractile force, forming a tight septum around the bacteria. Ejection of the bacteria occurs without host cell lysis.
