= Nucleomorph =

Special nuclei in certain plastids

Diagram of a four membraned plastid containing a nucleomorph

Nucleomorphs are small, vestigial eukaryotic nuclei found between the inner and outer pairs of membranes in certain plastids. They are thought to be vestiges of red and green algal nuclei that were engulfed by a larger eukaryote. Because the nucleomorph lies between two sets of membranes, nucleomorphs support the endosymbiotic theory and are evidence that the plastids containing them are complex plastids. Having two sets of membranes indicate that the plastid, a prokaryote, was engulfed by a eukaryote, an alga, which was then engulfed by another eukaryote, the host cell, making the plastid an example of secondary endosymbiosis.

== Organisms with known nucleomorphs ==
Structure of a cryptomonad cell

Structure of a chlorarachniophyte cell

Before 2020, only two monophyletic groups of organisms were known to contain plastids with a vestigial nucleus or nucleomorph: the cryptomonads of the supergroup Cryptista and the chlorarachniophytes of the supergroup Rhizaria, both of which have examples of sequenced nucleomorph genomes. Studies of the genomic organization and of the molecular phylogeny have shown that the nucleomorph of the cryptomonads used to be the nucleus of a red alga, whereas the nucleomorph of the chlorarchniophytes was the nucleus of a green alga. In both groups of organisms the plastids originate from engulfed photoautotrophic eukaryotes. Both have four membranes, the nucleomorph residing in the periplastidial compartment, evidence of being engulfed by a eukaryote through phagocytosis.

In 2020, genetic work identified the plastid in Lepidodinium and two previously undescribed dinoflagellates ("MGD" and "TGD") as being most closely related to the green alga Pedinomonas. The observation of a nucleomorph in Lepidodinium is controversial, but MGD and TGD are proven to have DNA-containing nucleomorphs. The transcriptomes of the nucleomorphs have been sequenced. One slight issue in understanding the sequence of evolution is that although the phylogenetic tree built from Lepidodinium-MGD-TGD's plastid is monophyletic, the tree built from their host-nucleus DNA is not, implying that they might have acquired very similar algae independently.

== Structure ==
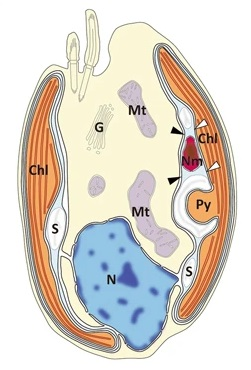
Structure of Guillardia theta (Cryptomonada). Nm: nucleomorph

A cryptomonad nucleomorph is typically much smaller than the host nucleus. A relatively large portion of its size is devoted to the nucleolus, which contains its own ribosomes and rRNA. There seems to be nuclear pores observable by imaging, but genetic work has failed to find any protein appropriate for forming the nuclear pore complex.

There is one nucleomorph per plastid. The nucleomorph divides before the accompanying plastid. The dividing nucleomorph lacks a mitotic spindle, and the nucleomorph envelope persists throughout division.

Between the plastid and the cytoplasm of the host there are four membranes: the inner and outer membranes of the chloroplast, the periplastid membrane, and the epiplastid membrane. The epiplastid membrane is encrusted with ribosomes (in cryptomonads) and is in many ways similar to a endoplasmic reticulum, hence the name "chloroplast endoplasmic reticulum" (cER). Plastid-targeted proteins encoded in the host genome must cross all four membranes to reach the plastid. First they use classic secretory signal peptides to cross the epiplastid membrane. Then the symbiont-specific ERAD-like machinery (SELMA) – encoded in the nucleomorph as a repurposed ERAD – pulls the protein from the epiplastid space (or the lumen of the cER) into the periplastid space (the cytoplasm of the symbiote). The standard chloroplast transit peptide then acts to cross the remaining two layers via TIC/TOC complex.

The chlorarachniophytes, on the other hand, has no such thing as a cER, hence the initial import into the epiplastid space must occur by some other mechanism. It's only known that their plastid-targeted proteins are prefixed by both a signal peptide and a chloroplast-targeting peptide much like cryptomonads. Based on research done on apicomplexa, which also has 4 membranes but no cER, it's possible that the protein is first sent into the ER, then sent to the epiplastid space by the endomembrane sorting system. Some sort of a pore may then move the peptide into the periplastid space, but there seems to be no SELMA-like pore in this group. It's only known that the TIC/TOC complex exists for crossing the last two layers.

== Nucleomorph genome ==
Nucleomorphs represent some of the smallest genomes ever sequenced. After the red or green alga was engulfed by a cryptomonad or chlorarachniophyte, respectively, its genome was reduced. The nucleomorph genomes of both cryptomonads and chlorarachniophytes converged upon a similar size from larger genomes. They retained only three chromosomes and many genes were transferred to the nucleus of the host cell, while others were lost entirely. Chlorarachniophytes contain a nucleomorph genome that is diploid and cryptomonads contain a nucleomorph genome that is tetraploid. The unique combination of host cell and complex plastid results in cells with four genomes: two prokaryotic genomes (mitochondrion and plastid of the red or green algae) and two eukaryotic genomes (nucleus of host cell and nucleomorph).

The model cryptomonad Guillardia theta became an important focus for scientists studying nucleomorphs. Its complete nucleomorph sequence was published in 2001, coming in at 551 Kbp. The G. theta sequence gave insight as to what genes were retained in nucleomorphs. Most of the genes that moved to the host cell involved protein synthesis, leaving behind a compact genome with mostly single-copy “housekeeping” genes (affecting transcription, translation, protein folding and degradation and splicing) and no mobile elements. The genome contains 513 genes, 465 of which code for protein. Thirty genes are considered “plastid” genes, coding for plastid proteins. It has three chromosomes with eukaryotic telomeres subtended by rRNA.

The genome sequence of another organism, the chlorarachniophyte Bigelowiella natans indicates that its nucleomorph is probably the vestigial nucleus of a green alga, whereas the nucleomorph in G. theta probably came from a red alga. The B. natans genome is smaller than that of G. theta, with about 373 Kbp and contains 293 protein-coding genes as compared to the 465 genes in G. theta. B. natans also only has 17 genes that code for plastid proteins, again fewer than G. theta. Comparisons between the two organisms have shown that B. natans contains significantly more introns (852) than G. theta (17). B. natans also had smaller introns, ranging from 18-21 bp, whereas G. theta’s introns ranged from 42-52 bp.

Both the genomes of B. natans and G. theta display evidence of genome reduction besides elimination of genes and tiny size, including elevated composition of adenine (A) and thymine (T), and high substitution rates.

Genes encoded in cryptophyte nucleomorph genomes have been used in phylogenomic attempts at reconstructing the evolutionary history of cryptophyte secondary plastids, resulting in topologies different from those reconstructed based on plastid genome-encoded genes. The nucleomorph-based phylogenetic trees point toward the mostly extremophilic red algae of the subdivision Cyanidiophytina as the closest relatives of the cryptophyte plastid donor lineage, while the plastid-based trees point toward the mostly mesophilic Rhodophytina.

== Persistence of nucleomorphs ==
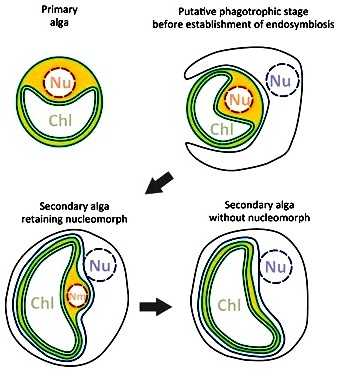
The course of the establishment of secondary plastids

There are no recorded instances of vestigial nuclei in any other secondary plastid-containing organisms, yet they have been retained independently in the cryptomonads and chlorarachniophytes. Plastid gene transfer happens frequently in many organisms, and it is unusual that these nucleomorphs have not disappeared entirely. One theory as to why these nucleomorphs have not disappeared as they have in other groups is that introns present in nucleomorphs are not recognized by host spliceosomes because they are too small and therefore cannot be cut and later incorporated into host DNA.

Nucleomorphs also often code for many of their own critical functions, like transcription and translation. Some say that as long as there exists a gene in the nucleomorph that codes for proteins necessary for the plastid’s functioning that are not produced by the host cell, the nucleomorph will persist. The cryptomonad nucleomorph also codes for genes that function in plastid maintenance.

In cryptophytes and chlorarachniophytes all DNA transfer between the nucleomorph and host genome seems to have ceased, but the process is still going on in a few dinoflagellates (MGD and TGD).

== Tertiary endosymbiosis ==
The standard nucleomorph is the result of secondary endosymbiosis: a cyanobacterium first became the chloroplast of ancestral plants, which diverged into green and red algae among other groups; the algal cell is then captured by another eukaryote. The chloroplast is surrounded by 4 membranes: 2 layers resulting from the primary, and 2 resulting from the secondary. When the nucleus of the algal endosymbiont remains, it's called a "nucleomorph".

Most tertiary endosymbiosis events end up with only the plastid retained. However, in the case of dinotoms (i.e. those having diatom endosymbionts), the symbiont's nucleus appears to be of normal size with a large amount of DNA, surrounded by plenty of cytoplasm. The symbiont even has its own DNA-containing mitochondria. As a result, the organism has two eukaryotic genomes and three prokaryotic-derived organelle genomes.

== See also ==
- Endosymbiont
