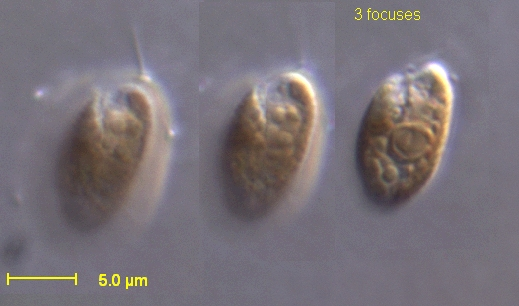
- Rhodomonas salina

Scientific classification
- Domain: Eukaryota
- Clade: Pancryptista
- Phylum: Cryptista
- Superclass: Cryptomonada
- Class: Cryptophyceae
- Order: Pyrenomonadales; Novarino and Lucas, 2008

Type genus
- "Pyrenomonas" (nomen nudum) Santore

Families
- Falcomonadaceae; Geminigeraceae; Pyrenomonadaceae

= Pyrenomonadales =

Order of single-celled organisms

Pyrenomonadales is an order of Cryptophyceae.
