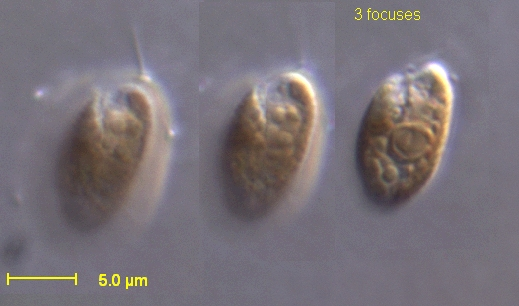
- Rhodomonas salina

Scientific classification
- Domain: Eukaryota
- Clade: Rollomonadia
- Division: Cryptophyta; Cavalier-Smith 1986

Type genus
- Cryptomonas

Classes
- Goniomonadea; Cryptophyceae

Synonyms
- Cryptomonada Cavalier-Smith 2004 stat. n. 2015

= Cryptomonad =

Cryptomonads

Group of algae and colorless flagellates

The cryptomonads (sometimes called cryptophytes) are a group of algae and colorless flagellates, most of which have plastids. They are traditionally considered a division of algae among phycologists, under the name of Cryptophyta. They are common in freshwater, and also occur in marine and brackish habitats. Each cell is around 10–50 μm in size and flattened in shape, with an anterior groove or pocket. At the edge of the pocket there are typically two slightly unequal flagella. Some may exhibit mixotrophy. They are divided into two classes: heterotrophic Goniomonadea and phototrophic Cryptophyceae. The two groups are united under three shared morphological characteristics: presence of a periplast, ejectisomes with secondary scroll, and mitochondrial cristae with flat tubules. Genetic studies as early as 1994 also supported the hypothesis that Goniomonas was sister to Cryptophyceae.

== Characteristics ==
Cryptomonads are distinguished by the presence of characteristic extrusomes called ejectosomes, which consist of two connected spiral ribbons held under tension. If the cells are irritated either by mechanical, chemical or light stress, they discharge, propelling the cell in a zig-zag course away from the disturbance. Large ejectosomes, visible under the light microscope, are associated with the pocket; smaller ones occur underneath the periplast, the cryptophyte-specific cell surrounding.

Except for the class Goniomonadea, which lacks plastids entirely, and Cryptomonas paramecium (previously called Chilomonas paramecium), which has leucoplasts, cryptomonads have one or two chloroplasts. These contain chlorophylls a and c, together with phycobiliproteins and other pigments, and vary in color (brown, red to blueish-green). Each is surrounded by four membranes, and there is a reduced cell nucleus called a nucleomorph between the middle two. This indicates that the plastid was derived from a eukaryotic symbiont, shown by genetic studies to have been a red alga. However, the plastids are very different from red algal plastids: phycobiliproteins are present but only in the thylakoid lumen and are present only as phycoerythrin or phycocyanin. In the case of Rhodomonas, the crystal structure has been determined to 1.63 Å; and it has been shown that the alpha subunit bears no relation to any other known phycobiliprotein.

A few cryptomonads, such as Cryptomonas, can form palmelloid stages, but readily escape the surrounding mucus to become free-living flagellates again. Some Cryptomonas species may also form immotile microbial cysts—resting stages with rigid cell walls to survive unfavorable conditions. Cryptomonad flagella are inserted parallel to one another, and are covered by bipartite hairs called mastigonemes, formed within the endoplasmic reticulum and transported to the cell surface. Small scales may also be present on the flagella and cell body. The mitochondria have flat cristae, and mitosis is open; sexual reproduction has also been reported.

Representation of a cryptomonad: 1. Anterior flagellum (mastigonemes on both faces); 2. Posterior flagellum (mastigonemes on one face); 3. Contractile vacuole, regulates the quantity of water inside a cell; 4. Vestibulum; 5. Basal bodies; 6. Gullet (furrow or crypt); 7. Mitochondrion, creates ATP (energy) for the cell; 8. Maupa's bodies; 9. Ejectisomes; 10. Starch granule; 11. Golgi apparatus, packages proteins; 12. Nucleomorph, a small, vestigial eukaryotic nucleus; 13. Pyrenoid, center of carbon fixation; 14. Periplastidial compartment; 15. Thylakoid, site of the light-dependent reactions of photosynthesis; 16. Plastid membranes (4, secondary); 17. Nucleus; 18. Nucleolus; 19. Lipid globules

== Classification ==
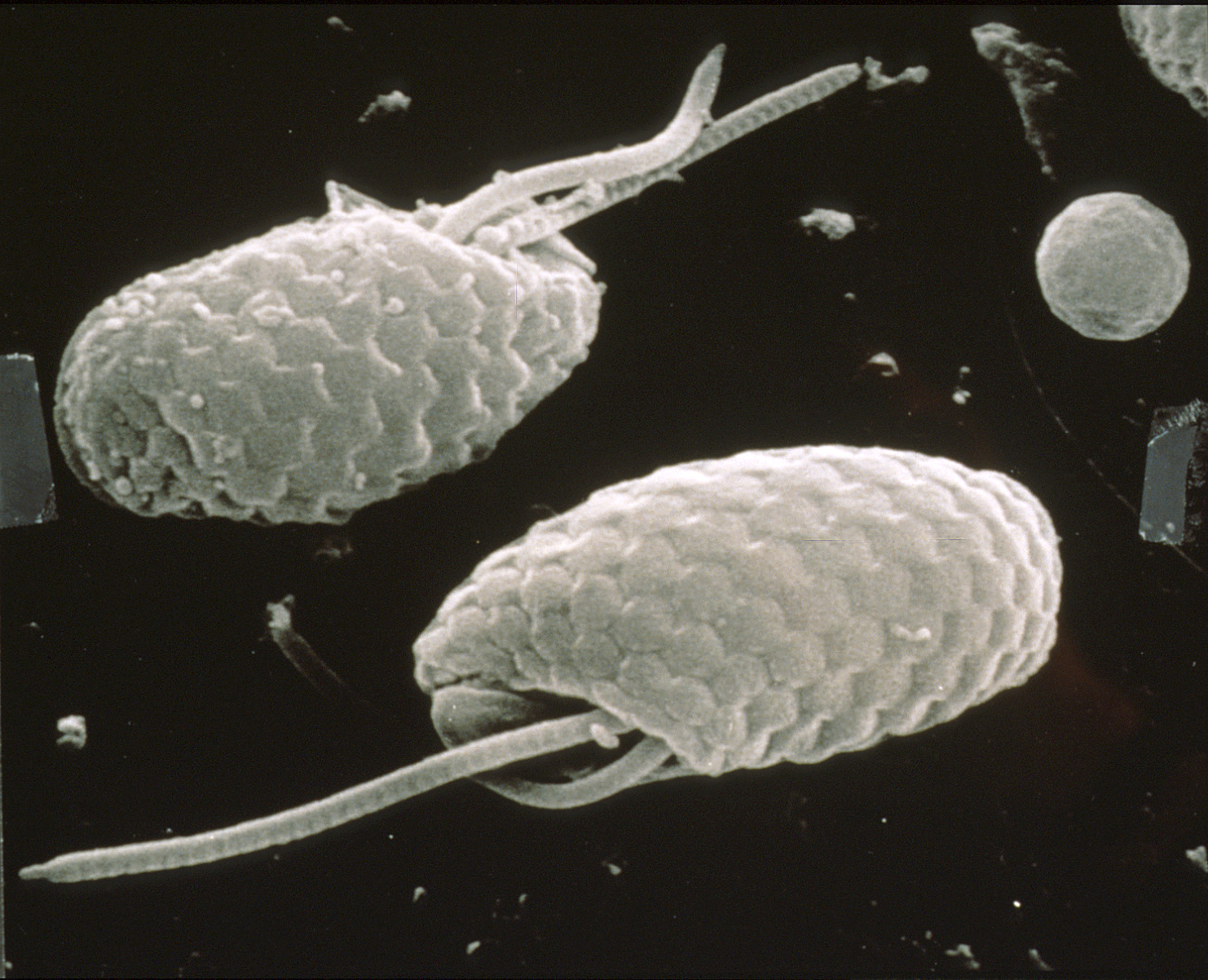
Cryptophytes under SEM

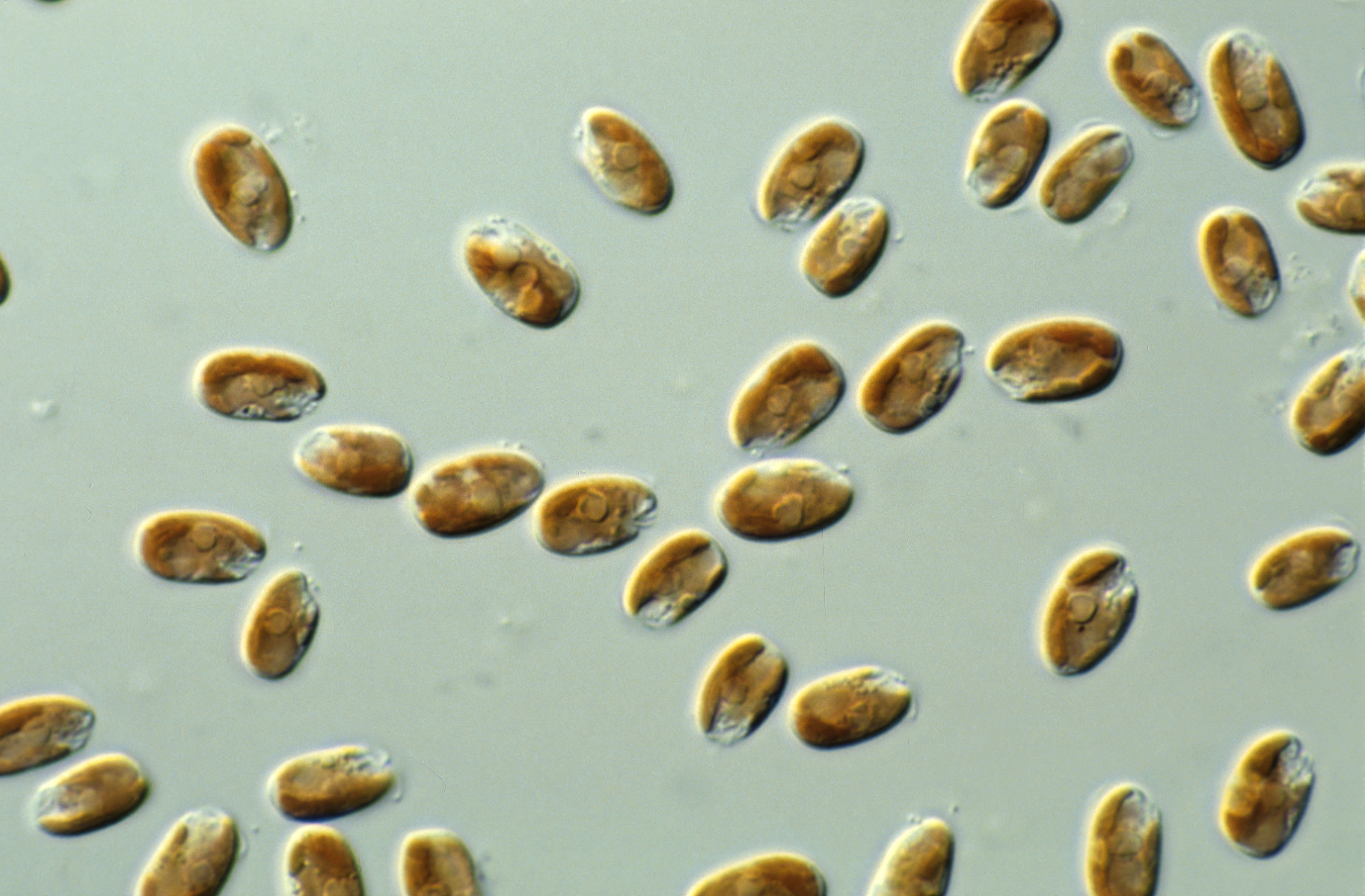
Cryptophytes under light microscope

The first mention of cryptomonads appears to have been made by Christian Gottfried Ehrenberg in 1831, while studying Infusoria. Later, botanists treated them as a separate algae group, class Cryptophyceae or division Cryptophyta, while zoologists treated them as the flagellate protozoa order Cryptomonadina. In some classifications, the cryptomonads were considered close relatives of the dinoflagellates because of their (seemingly) similar pigmentation, being grouped as the Pyrrhophyta. Cryptomonad chloroplasts are closely related to those of the heterokonts and haptophytes, and the three groups were united by Cavalier-Smith as the Chromista. However, the case that the organisms themselves are closely related was counter-indicated by the major differences in cell organization (ultrastructural identity), suggesting that the three major lineages assigned to the chromists had acquired plastids independently, and that chromists are polyphyletic. The perspective that cryptomonads are primitively heterotrophic and secondarily acquired chloroplasts, is supported by molecular evidence. Parfrey et al. and Burki et al. placed Cryptophyceae as a sister clade to the Green Algae, or green algae plus glaucophytes. The sister group to the cryptomonads is likely the kathablepharids (also referred to as katablepharids), a group of flagellates that also have ejectisomes. The Cryptophyta was proposed in 1986 by Cavalier-Smith.

One suggested grouping is as follows: (1) Cryptomonas, (2) Chroomonas/Komma and Hemiselmis, (3) Rhodomonas/Rhinomonas/Storeatula, (4) Guillardia/Hanusia, (5) Geminigera/Plagioselmis/Teleaulax, (6) Proteomonas sulcata, (7) Falcomonas daucoides.
