= Pancryptista =

Scientific classification
- Domain: Eukaryota
- Clade: Diaphoretickes
- Clade: CAM
- Clade: Pancryptista; Yazaki et al. 2022

Subgroups
- Cryptista; Microheliella

Clade of eukaryotes

Pancryptista is a clade that includes the Cryptista as well as the Microheliella. Phylogenomic analyses from 2022 suggest the Microheliella is sister to the Cryptista, forming the clade called Pancryptista, which would be sister to the Archaeplastida, forming the CAM clade.
