= Cortical alveolum =

Cellular organelles found in protists

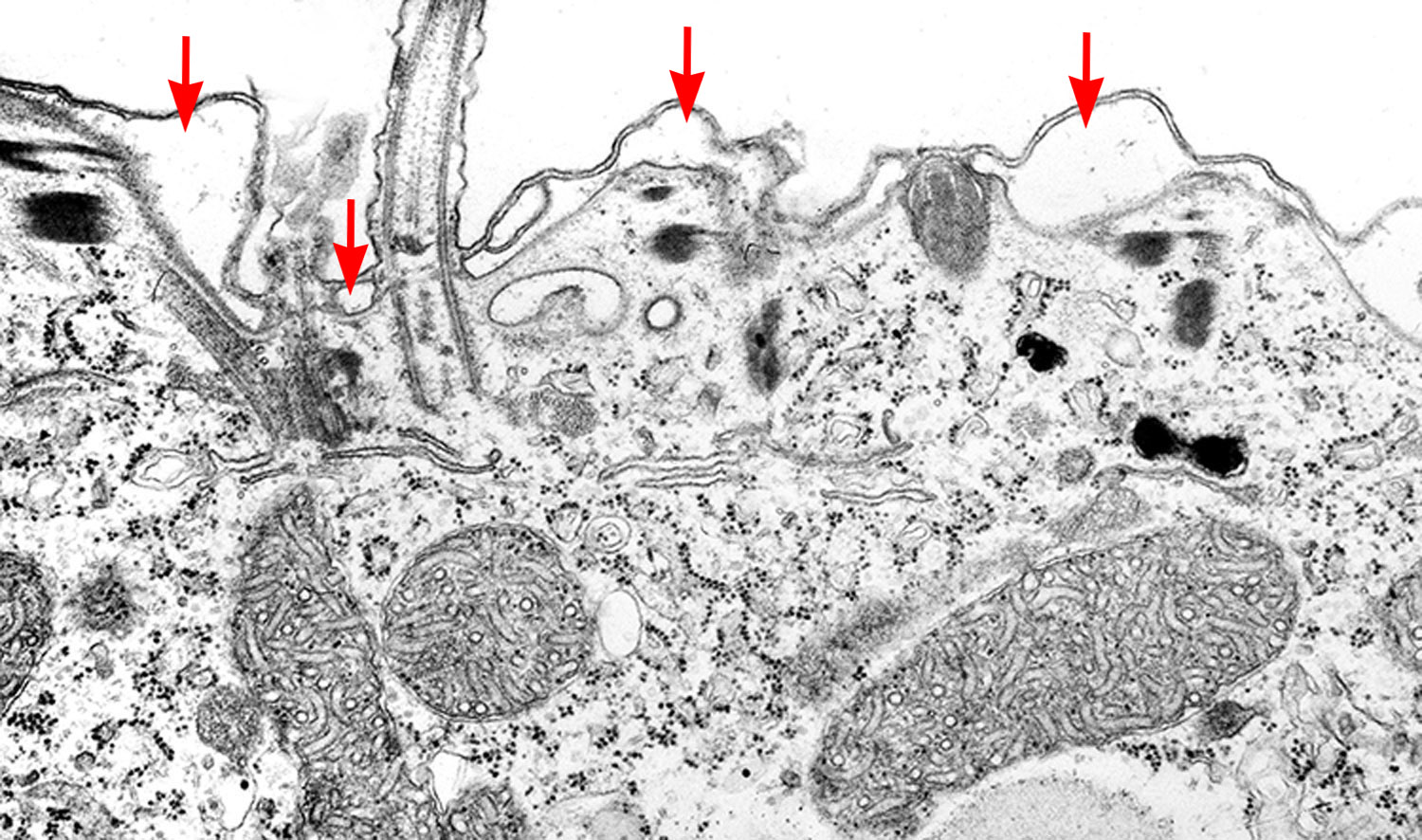
Transmission electron micrograph of a thin section of the surface of the ciliate Paramecium putrinum, showing the alveoli (red arrows) under the cell surface

Cortical alveoli are cellular organelles consisting of vesicles located under the cytoplasmic membrane, to which they give support. The term "corticate" comes from an evolutionary hypothesis about the common origin of kingdoms Plantae and Chromista, because both kingdoms have cortical alveoli in at least one phylum. At least three protist lineages exhibit these structures: Telonemia, Alveolata and Glaucophyta.

== Definition ==
Cortical alveoli have been defined as flattened membranous sacs or vesicles that strengthen the cellular cortex through the firm fixation to the underlying membrane and microtubules. They typically form a continuous layer that acts as a flexible film, although they can also constitute a semi-rigid structure or the scales of a theca.

== Occurrence ==
Cortical alveoli are the defining morphological characteristic of the protist clade Alveolata, otherwise united solely by molecular phylogeny. The name 'Alveolata' is a reference to this trait, present in all representatives of this group: the parasitic apicomplexans and perkinsozoans, the predatory ciliates and colpodellids, the chromerid algae, and the ecologically diverse dinoflagellates, as well as small basal flagellates collectively known as colponemids. A small phylum of eukaryotes, Telonemia, contains flagellated species that exhibit flattened alveoli, much like in Alveolata. Both groups share evolutionary affinity, comprising the TSAR supergroup along with Stramenopiles and Rhizaria.

In addition to the TSAR supergroup, the Archaeplastida supergroup contains a lineage of algae with cortical alveoli, known as Glaucophyta. All species of glaucophytes exhibit flattened membranous alveoli lying immediately below the plasma membrane, in every region of the cell except for the flagellar furrow. In addition, these alveoli may contain rigid plates that, similarly to thecate dinoflagellates, define the shape of the otherwise amorphous cell. The common morphological trait with alveolates has been used to propose a common evolutionary origin between the kingdoms Plantae (defined as Archaeplastida) and Chromista (containing alveolates). This is known as the "corticate" hypothesis, postulated by protozoologist Thomas Cavalier-Smith, but later rejected due to the non-monophyly of kingdom Chromista. Instead, both Archaeplastida and the TSAR supergroup are united in a clade known as Diaphoretickes, which contains the remaining chromist groups Haptista and Cryptista.

== Function ==
Although cortical alveoli are very diverse in shape and function among the different groups of protists, they always share the function of supporting the cytoplasmic membrane. In the case of apicomplexan parasites, the alveoli are related both to mobility and to the invasion of host cells and thus have a particular relevance in medicine. In dinoflagellates, the alveoli contain cellulose and compose the scales of their armor. The alveoli of ciliates are part of the cortical complex that supports the extrusomes, the basal bodies of the cilia, and the intricate cortical shell.
