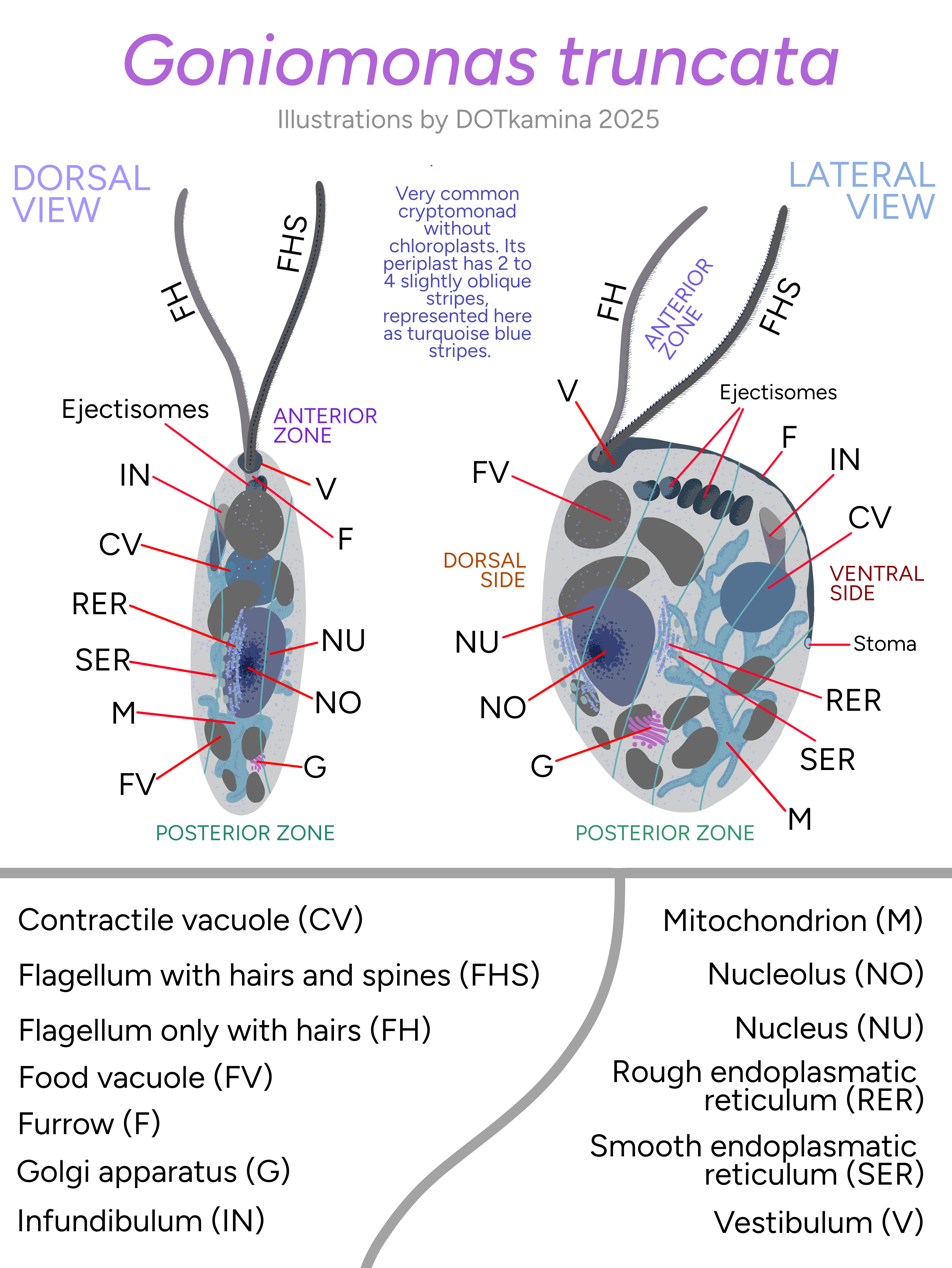
- Cell anatomy of Goniomonas truncata

Scientific classification
- Domain: Eukaryota
- (unranked): Hacrobia
- (unranked): Cryptista
- Class: Goniomonadea
- Order: Goniomonadida
- Family: Goniomonadidae
- Genus: Goniomonas von Stein 1878

Type species
- Goniomonas truncata (Fresenius 1858) von Stein 1878

Species
- See text

= Goniomonas =

Genus of single-celled organisms

Goniomonas is a genus of Cryptomonads and contains five species. It is a genus of single-celled eukaryotes, including both freshwater and marine species. It lacks plastids, which is very unusual among all of the Cryptophyte genera. It may reflect one of only a small number of times that the Cryptophytes evolved into freshwater habitats. Goniomonas seems to have a number of freshwater relatives which have not yet been cultured and named.

== Etymology ==
Goniomonas means angled small flagellates, combining goni and monas.

== History of Discovery ==
It was established by German biologist Samuel Friedrich Stein in 1878.

== Morphology ==
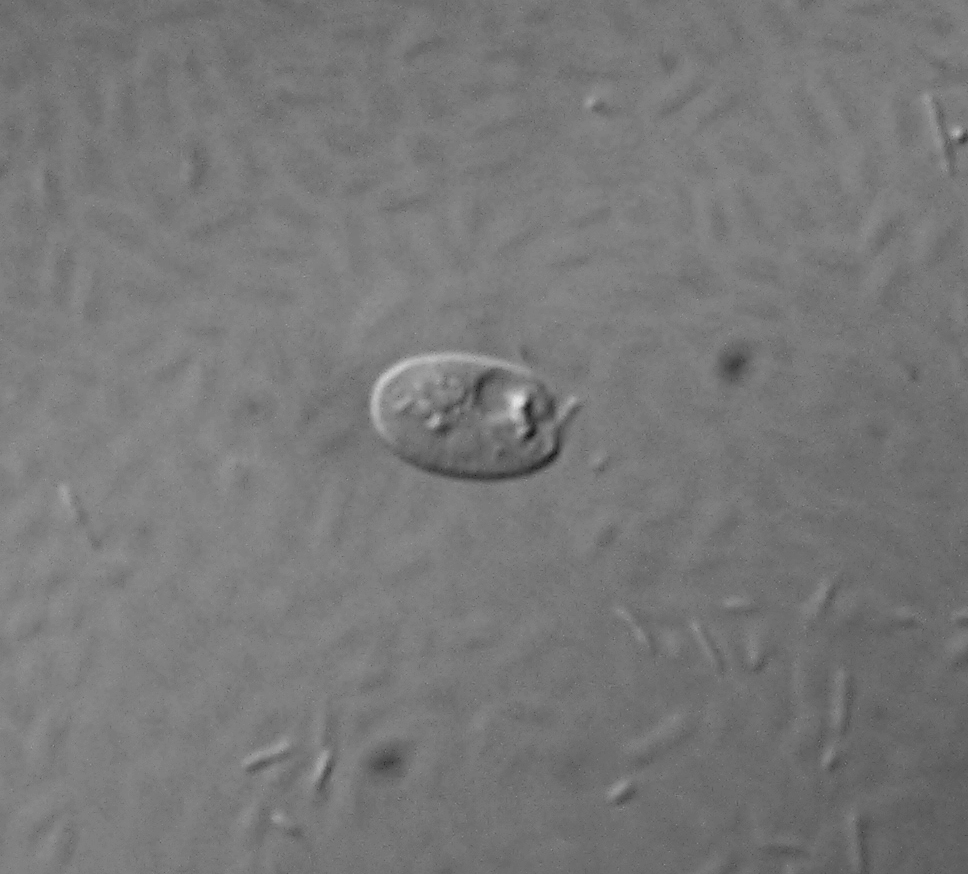
Goniomonas sp. 1000x on optic microscope.

This genus contains species that are free-swimming, flattened, biflagellate monads. They are oval in lateral view with an obliquely truncate anterior. A furrow extends along the middle of the anterior margin and for a short distance down the ventral margin and is surrounded by a single lateral row of ejectisomes. Chloroplasts, pyrenoids, nucleomorphs and starch are absent. They have periplast with longitudinal striations visible in all species. And, Goniomonas is the only Cryptomonad so far examined that does not possess a plastidial complex, and is therefore considered primitive among Cryptophytes. Other Cryptophytes have bipartite tubular flagellar hairs, whereas Goniomonas has solid spike-like flagellar projections. The furrow-gullet system of Goniomonas is located on the anterior of the cell rather than the usual ventral location.

== Reproduction ==
Cyst production is not known in this genus.

== Ecology ==
The genus is well known in freshwater habitats with a cosmopolitan distribution, but is rarely abundant. It is also present in marine waters. The temperatures and specific depths suitable for the species are not recorded.

== Genetics ==
Only one freshwater and two marine species have been extensively described so far. Marine species are G. pacifica and G. amphinema, while G. truncata is a freshwater species. Although the two marine species are morphologically quite distinct from each other, it was unclear until recently whether one of them, G. pacifica, is really separate from the freshwater G. truncata because their morphology and size are similar. Results reveal remarkable genetic diversity within all three nominal species and confirm that G. pacifica is genetically very distinct from G. truncata. Scientists suggest that if further studied, Goniomonads might turn out to have as many ‘species’ as Cryptophytes. They reproduce by asexual reproduction as current research concludes. Further studies can focus on whether Goniomonads are sexual. And, it is still to determine whether the biological species concept can be applied to them.

== List of species ==
The following is a list of species.

- Goniomonas amphinema Larsen & Patterson, 1990
- Goniomonas avonlea Kim & Archibald, 2012
- Goniomonas elongata Maskell, 1888
- Goniomonas pacifica Larsen & Patterson, 1990
- Goniomonas truncata (Fresenius) Stein, 1878
