= Leucocryptos =

Scientific classification
- Domain: Eukaryota
- Supergroup: Cryptista
- Phylum: Kathablepharida
- Class: Kathablepharidea
- Order: Kathablepharidida
- Family: Kathablepharidae
- Genus: Leucocryptos; Butcher, 1967
- Species: L. marina

Binomial name
- Leucocryptos marina (Braarud, 1935) Butcher, 1967

Synonyms
- Bodo marina Braarud, 1935; Chilomonas marina (Braarud, 1935) Halldal, 1953

Genus of single-celled organisms

Leucocryptos is a genus of single-celled eukaryotes comprising one to two species.

== Species ==
- Leucocryptos marina
- Leucocryptos remigera (moved to Kathablepharis remigera)
