= Patron (disambiguation) =

A patron is a person or organization that supports another.

Patron or Patrón may also refer to:

== Common uses ==
- Customer
- Patreon subscriber
- Patron deity
- Patron saint
- Sponsor, a patron of a bill

== People ==
- Patricio Patrón Laviada (born 1957), Mexican politician who served as Governor of Yucatán
- Elena Patron (1933–2021), Filipino scriptwriter, novelist, poet, dramatist, essayist, and magazine columnist
- Giselle Patrón (born 1987), Peruvian model and actress
- Nicola J. Patron, born 20th century, British plant scientist
- Pablo Escobar (1949–1993), Colombian drug lord nicknamed “El Patrón”
- Patron (rapper) (born 1988), Turkish rapper

== Arts, entertainment, and media ==
- Patron (2021 video game)
- El Patrón, an album by Puerto Rican singer-songwriter Tito El Bambino
- Purp & Patron, two mixtapes and the first double disc mixtape by rapper Game
- The Patron (La Patronne), a 1950 French comedy film
- "The Patron" (Plebs), a 2014 television episode

== Animals ==
- Patron (dog), a Ukrainian bomb-sniffing dog and mascot
- Patron (horse), a racehorse

== Other uses ==
- Patrón, a brand of tequila
- Pizza Patrón, an American pizza chain

== See also ==
- Patronage (disambiguation)
- Pattern, type of theme of recurring events or objects
