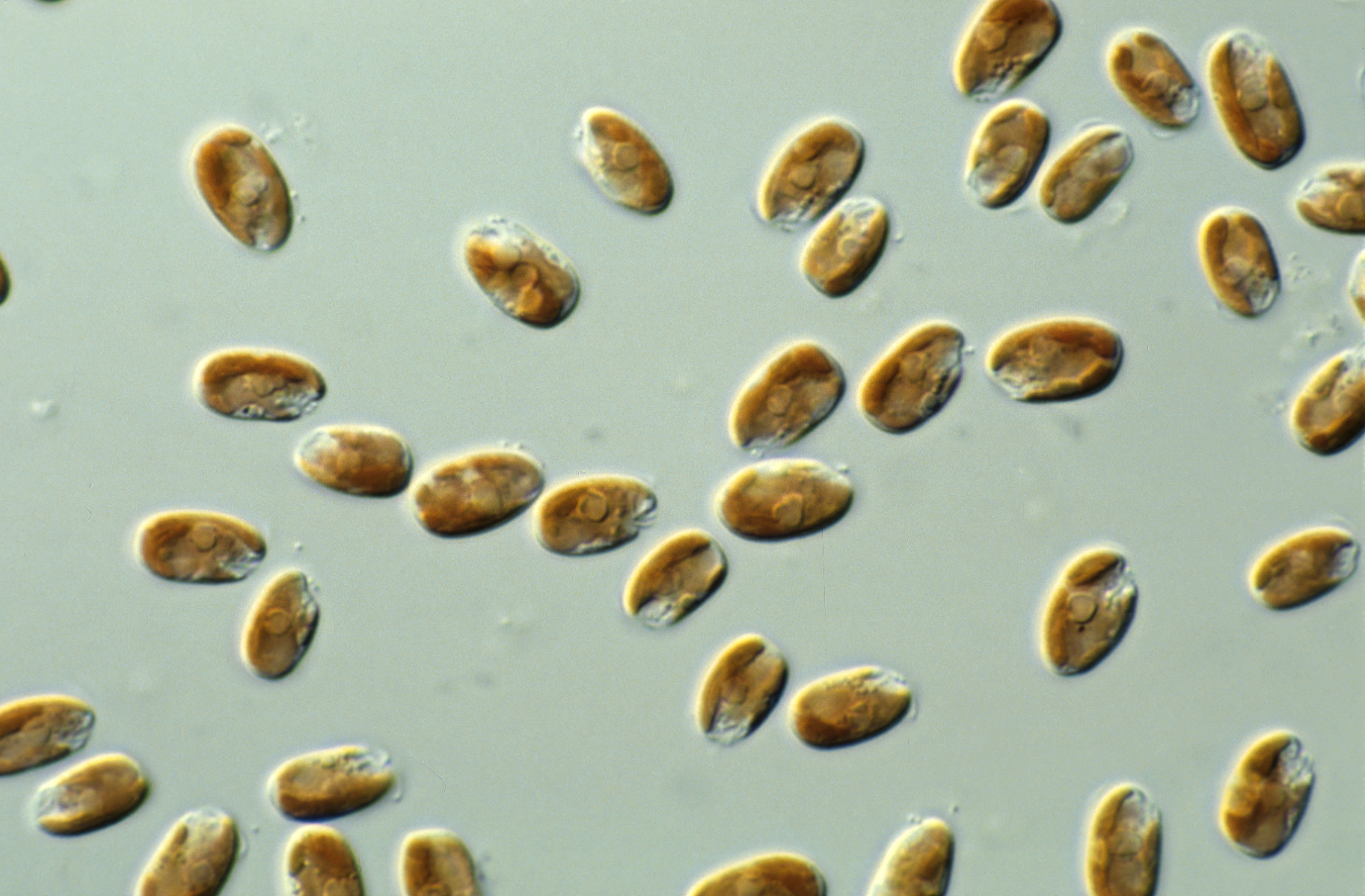
- Cryptophytes under light microscopy

Scientific classification
- Domain: Eukaryota
- Clade: Cryptista
- Clade: Rollomonadia; Cavalier-Smith 2013

Classes
- Cryptomonada; Cryptophyceae; Goniomonadea; Leucocrypta; Leucocryptea (katablepharids)

Synonyms
- Cryptophyceae Pascher 1913, emend. Schoenichen 1925, emend. Adl et al. 2012

= Rollomonadia =

Group of flagellates

Rollomonadia is a group of single-celled flagellates. It contains a small group of heterotrophic flagellates known as katablepharids, as well as the abundant cryptomonads (=cryptophytes), which comprise the heterotrophic Goniomonadea and the photosynthetic Cryptophyceae. Together with Palpitomonas and the Endohelea heliozoans, they compose the Cryptista. Members of this clade are distinguished from other Cryptista by the presence of specialized extrusomes known as ejectisomes.
