= Hemiarma =

Scientific classification
- Domain: Eukaryota
- (unranked): Pancryptista
- (unranked): Cryptista
- Class: Goniomonadea
- Order: Hemiarmida
- Family: Hemiarmidae
- Genus: Hemiarma Shiratori & Ishida 2016
- Species: H. marina

Binomial name
- Hemiarma marina Shiratori & Ishida 2016

Genus of single-celled organisms

Hemiarma is a monotypic genus of cryptomonad discovered off the coast of Palau in 2016.
