= Platychilomonas =

Scientific classification
- Domain: Eukaryota
- Phylum: Cryptista
- Class: Leucocryptea
- Order: Kathablepharidida
- Family: Kathablepharididae
- Genus: Platychilomonas; Larsen & Patterson 1990
- Species: P. psammobia

Binomial name
- Platychilomonas psammobia Larsen & Patterson 1990

Genus of single-celled organism

Platychilomonas psammobia is a species of flagellate.
