= CRY1 (disambiguation) =

CRY1 can mean the following:

- Cryptochrome-1, a protein
- CRY1, a taxon in Cryptista
