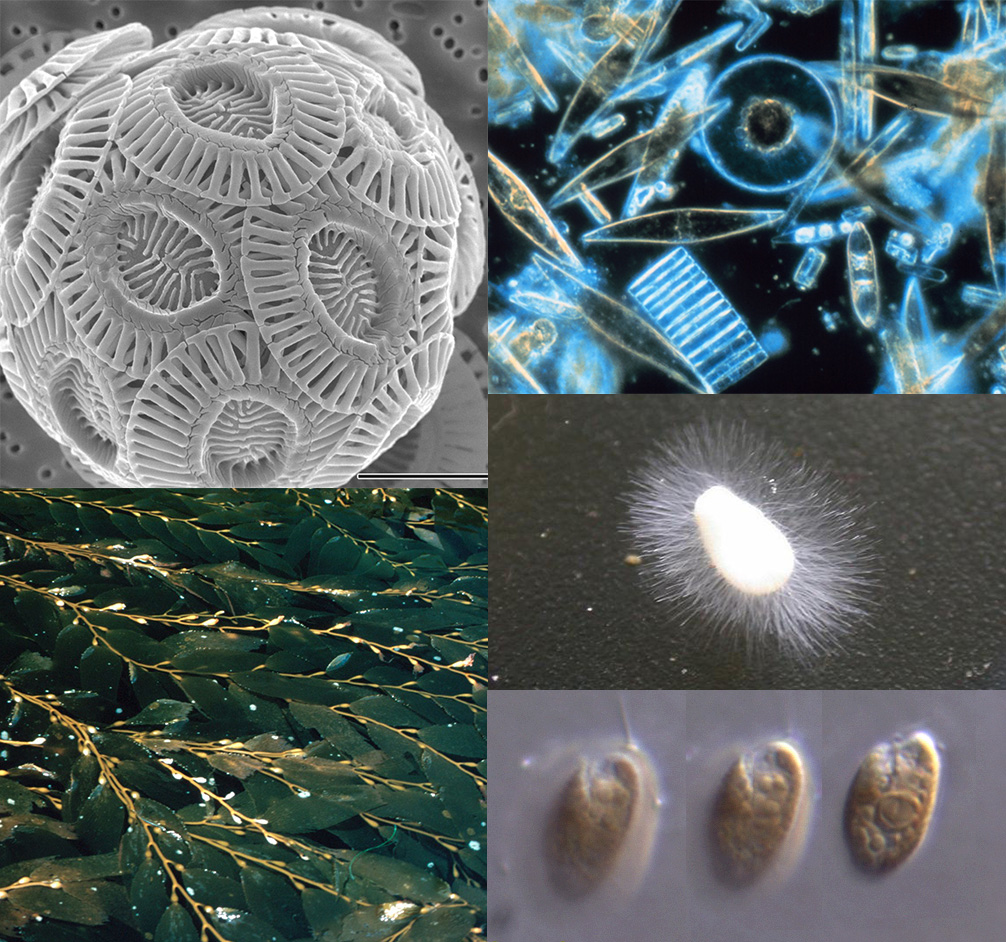
- Chromista collage

Scientific classification (contested)
- Clade: Eukaryota
- Superkingdom: Corticata
- Kingdom: Chromista; Cavalier-Smith 1981

Subgroups
- Harosa; Halvaria; Heterokonta; Alveolata; Rhizaria; Telonemia; Hacrobia

= Chromista =

Proposed eukaryotic kingdom

Chromista is a proposed but controversial biological kingdom, refined from the Chromalveolata, consisting of single-celled and multicellular eukaryotic species that share similar features in their photosynthetic organelles (plastids). It includes all eukaryotes whose plastids contain chlorophyll c and are surrounded by four membranes. If the ancestor already possessed chloroplasts derived by endosymbiosis from red algae, all non-photosynthetic Chromista have secondarily lost the ability to photosynthesise. Its members might have arisen independently as separate evolutionary groups from the last eukaryotic common ancestor.

Chromista as a taxon was created by the British biologist Thomas Cavalier-Smith in 1981 to distinguish the stramenopiles, haptophytes, and cryptophytes. According to Cavalier-Smith, the kingdom originally consisted mostly of photosynthetic eukaryotes (algae), but he later brought many heterotrophs (protozoa) into the proposed group. As of 2022, the kingdom was nearly as diverse as the kingdoms Plantae and Animalia, consisting of nine phyla. Notable members include marine algae, potato blight, dinoflagellates, Paramecium, the brain parasite Toxoplasma, and the malarial parasite Plasmodium.

However, Cavalier-Smith's hypothesis of chromist monophyly has been rejected by many other researchers, who consider it more likely that some chromists acquired their plastids by incorporating another chromist instead of inheriting them from a common ancestor. This is thought to have occurred repeatedly, so that the red plastids spread from one group to another. The plastids, far from characterising their hosts as belonging to a single clade, thus have a different history from their disparate hosts. They appear to have originated in the Rhodophytina, and to have been transmitted to the Cryptophytina and from them to both the Ochrophyta and the Haptophyta, and then from the latter to the Myzozoa.

== Biology ==
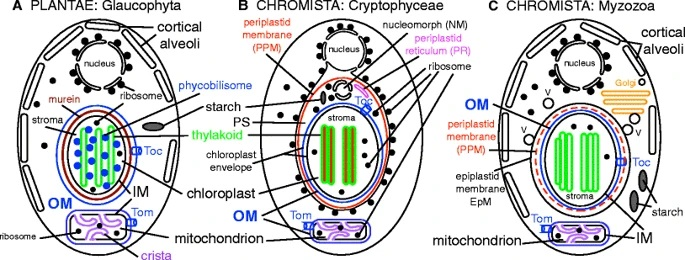
Structure of some types of Chromista compared with plant cell (left). The idea was that the Chromista had arisen, supposedly just once (making them monophyletic, and in Tom Cavalier-Smith's view a separate Kingdom) by enslaving a red alga, ending up with multiple membranes around what became their red plastids. Groups lacking red plastids were supposed to have secondarily lost them. The Cryptophyta are within the Cryptista; the Myzozoa are within the Alveolata.

Members of Chromista are single-celled and multicellular eukaryotes having basically either or both features:

1. plastid(s) that contain chlorophyll c and lie within an extra (periplastid) membrane in the lumen of the rough endoplasmic reticulum (typically within the perinuclear cisterna);
2. cilia with tripartite or bipartite rigid tubular hairs.

The kingdom includes diverse organisms from algae to malarial parasites (Plasmodium). Molecular evidence indicates that the plastids in chromists were derived from red algae through secondary symbiogenesis in a single event. In contrast, plants acquired their plastids from cyanobacteria through primary symbiogenesis. These plastids are now enclosed in two extra cell membranes, making a four-membrane envelope, as a result of which they acquired many other membrane proteins for transporting molecules in and out of the organelles. The diversity of chromists is hypothesised to have arisen from degeneration, loss or replacement of the plastids in some lineages. Additional symbiogenesis of green algae has provided genes retained in some members (such as heterokonts), and bacterial chlorophyll (indicated by the presence of ribosomal protein L36 gene, rpl36) in haptophytes and cryptophytes.

== History and groups ==
Some examples of classification of the groups involved, which have overlapping but non-identical memberships, are shown below.

=== Chromophycées (Chadefaud, 1950) ===
The Chromophycées (Chadefaud, 1950), renamed Chromophycota (Chadefaud, 1960), included the current Ochrophyta (autotrophic Stramenopiles), Haptophyta (included in Chrysophyceae until Christensen, 1962), Cryptophyta, Dinophyta, Euglenophyceae and Choanoflagellida (included in Chrysophyceae until Hibberd, 1975).

=== Chromophyta (Christensen, 1962 and 1989) ===
The Chromophyta (Christensen 1962, 2008), defined as algae with chlorophyll c, included the current Ochrophyta (autotrophic Stramenopiles), Haptophyta, Cryptophyta, Dinophyta and Choanoflagellida. The Euglenophyceae were transferred to the Chlorophyta.

=== Chromophyta (Bourrelly, 1968) ===
The Chromophyta (Bourrelly, 1968) included the current Ochrophyta (autotrophic Stramenopiles), Haptophyta and Choanoflagellida. The Cryptophyceae and the Dinophyceae were part of Pyrrhophyta (= Dinophyta).

=== Chromista (Cavalier-Smith, 1981) ===
The name Chromista was first introduced by Cavalier-Smith in 1981; Chromophyta (or Chromobiota) corresponds to non-cryptophyte chromists. It includes all protists whose plastids contain chlorophyll c. It has been described as consisting of three different groups:

- Heterokonts or Stramenopiles: brown algae, diatoms, water moulds, etc.
- Haptophytes
- Cryptomonads

In 1994, Cavalier-Smith and colleagues indicated that the Chromista is probably a polyphyletic group whose members arose independently, sharing no more than descent from the common ancestor of all eukaryotes:

The four phyla that contain chromophyte algae (those with chlorophyll c--i.e., Cryptista, Heterokonta, Haptophyta, Dinozoa) are distantly related to each other and to Chlorarachniophyta on our trees. However, all of the photosynthetic taxa within each of these four phyla radiate from each other very substantially after the radiation of the four phyla themselves. This favors the view that the common ancestor of these four phyla was not photosynthetic and that chloroplasts were implanted separately into each much more recently. This probable polyphyly of the chromophyte algae, if confirmed, would make it desirable to treat Cryptista, Heterokonta, and Haptophyta as separate kingdoms, rather than to group them together in the single kingdom Chromista.

In 2009, Cavalier-Smith gave his reason for making a new kingdom, saying:

I established Chromista as a kingdom distinct from Plantae and Protozoa because of the evidence that chromist chloroplasts were acquired secondarily by enslavement of a red alga, itself a member of kingdom Plantae, and their unique membrane topology.

Since then Chromista has been defined in different ways at different times. In 2010, Cavalier-Smith reorganised Chromista to include the SAR supergroup (named for the included groups Stramenopiles, Alveolata and Rhizaria) and Hacrobia (Haptista and Cryptista).

Patron et al. (2004) considered the presence of a unique class of FBA (fructose-1,6-biophosphate-aldolase) enzyme not similar to that found in plants as evidence of chromist monophyly. Fast et al. (2001) supported a single origin for the myzozoan (dinoflagellate + apicomplexan), heterokont and cryptophyte plastids based on their comparison of GAPDH (glyceraldehyde-3-phosphate dehydrogenase) genes. Harper & Keeling (2003) described haptophyte homologs and considered them further evidence of a single endosymbiotic event involving the ancestor of all chromists.

=== Chromalveolata (Adl et al., 2005) ===
The Chromalveolata included Stramenopiles, Haptophyta, Cryptophyta and Alveolata. However, in 2008 the group was found not to be monophyletic, and later studies confirmed this.

== Classification ==
=== Ruggiero et al., 2015 ===
In 2015, Cavalier-Smith and his colleagues made a new higher-level grouping of all organisms as a revision of the seven kingdoms model. In it, they classified the kingdom Chromista into 2 subkingdoms and 11 phyla, namely:

- Chromista 2015
  - Hacrobia
    - Cryptista
    - Heliozoa
    - Haptophyta
    - Phylum N.N.
      - Endohelea
      - Picomonadea
      - Telonemea
  - Harosa (SAR supergroup)
    - Rhizaria
      - Cercozoa
      - Retaria
    - Halvaria
      - Alveolata
        - Ciliophora
        - Miozoa
      - Heterokonta
        - Bigyra
        - Pseudofungi (Oomycota)
        - Ochrophyta

=== Cavalier-Smith, 2018 ===
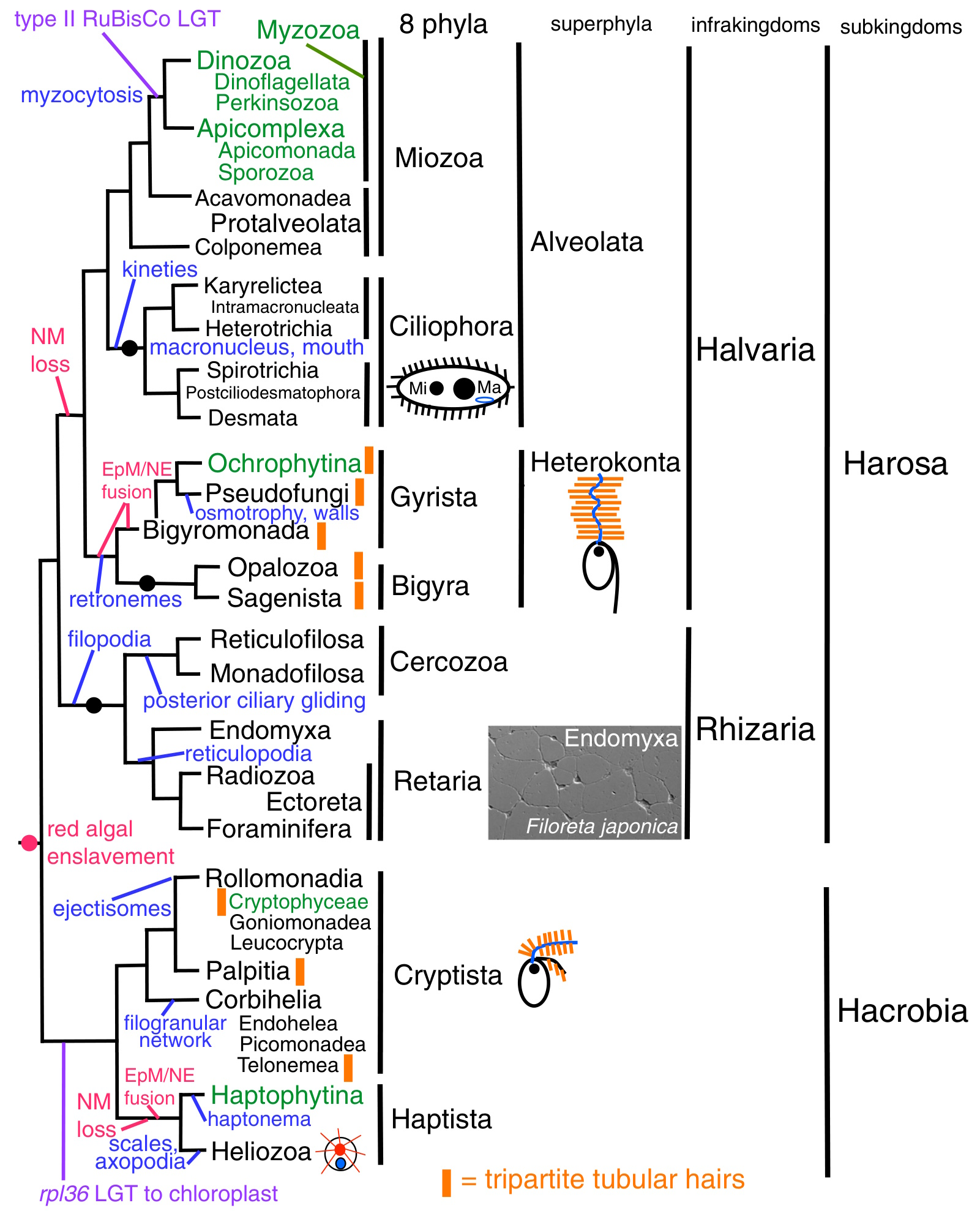
Chromista classification according to Cavalier-Smith, 2018, with supposed events marking group divergences

Cavalier-Smith made a new analysis of Chromista in 2018 in which he classified all chromists into 8 phyla (Gyrista corresponds to the above phyla Ochrophyta and Pseudofungi, Cryptista corresponds to the above phyla Cryptista and "N.N.", Haptista corresponds to the above phyla Haptophyta and Heliozoa):

- Chromista 2018
  - Hacrobia
    - Cryptista
    - Haptista
      - Heliozoa
      - Haptophytina
  - Harosa (SAR supergroup)
    - Rhizaria
      - Cercozoa
      - Retaria
    - Halvaria
      - Alveolata
        - Ciliophora
        - Miozoa
      - Heterokonta
        - - Bigyra
          - Gyrista

=== Cavalier-Smith, 2022 ===
Cavalier-Smith made Harosa synonymous with TSAR and added monotypic infrakingdom Telonemia containing phylum Telonemia to Harosa in 2022.

- Chromista 2022
  - Hacrobia
    - Cryptista
    - Haptista
      - Heliozoa
      - Haptophytina
  - Harosa
    - Telonemia
      Telonemia
    - SAR
      - Rhizaria
        - Cercozoa
        - Retaria
      - Halvaria
        - Alveolata
          - Ciliophora
          - Miozoa
        - Heterokonta
          - - Bigyra
            - Gyrista

== Polyphyly and serial endosymbiosis ==
Molecular trees have had difficulty resolving relationships between the different groups. All three may share a common ancestor with the alveolates (see chromalveolates), but there is evidence that suggests the haptophytes and cryptomonads do not belong together with the heterokonts or the SAR clade, but may be associated with the Archaeplastida. Cryptista specifically may be sister or part of Archaeplastida, though this could be an artefact due to acquisition of genes from red algae by cryptomonads.

A 2020 phylogeny of the eukaryotes states that "the chromalveolate hypothesis is not widely accepted" (noting Cavalier-Smith et al 2018 as an exception), explaining that the host lineages do not appear to be closely related in "most phylogenetic analyses". Further, none of TSAR, Cryptista, and Haptista, groups formerly within Chromalveolata, appear "likely to be ancestrally defined by red secondary plastids". This is because of the many non-photosynthetic organisms related to the groups with chlorophyll c, and the possibility that cryptophytes are more closely related to plants.

The alternative to monophyly is serial endosymbiosis, meaning that the "chromists" acquired their plastids from each other instead of inheriting them from a single common ancestor. Thus the phylogeny of the distinctive plastids, which are agreed to have a common origin in the rhodophytes, is different from the phylogeny of the host cells. In 2021, Jürgen Strassert and colleagues modelled the timelines for the presumed spread of the red plastids, concluding that "the hypotheses of serial endosymbiosis are chronologically possible, as the stem lineages of all red plastid-containing groups overlap in time" during the Mesoproterozoic and Neoproterozoic eras. They propose that the plastids were transmitted between groups as follows:

Model 1:

Rhodophyta → Cryptophyta → Ochrophyta → Haptophyta

↘ Myzozoa

Model 2:

Rhodophyta → Cryptophyta → Ochrophyta

↘ Haptophyta → Myzozoa

Another alternative proposes two distinct events of secondary endosymbiosis involving different lineages of red alga: one event transferring a plastid to Cryptophyta (from a cyanidiophyte-like red alga), and another transferring to Ochrophyta. Each would have been succeeded by a tertiary endosymbiosis transferring plastids to haptophytes and alveolates, respectively:

Rhodophyta → Cryptophyta → Haptophyta
Rhodophyta → Ochrophyta → Myzozoa

== See also ==
- Cabozoa
- Cavalier-Smith's system of classification
- List of Chromista by conservation status
