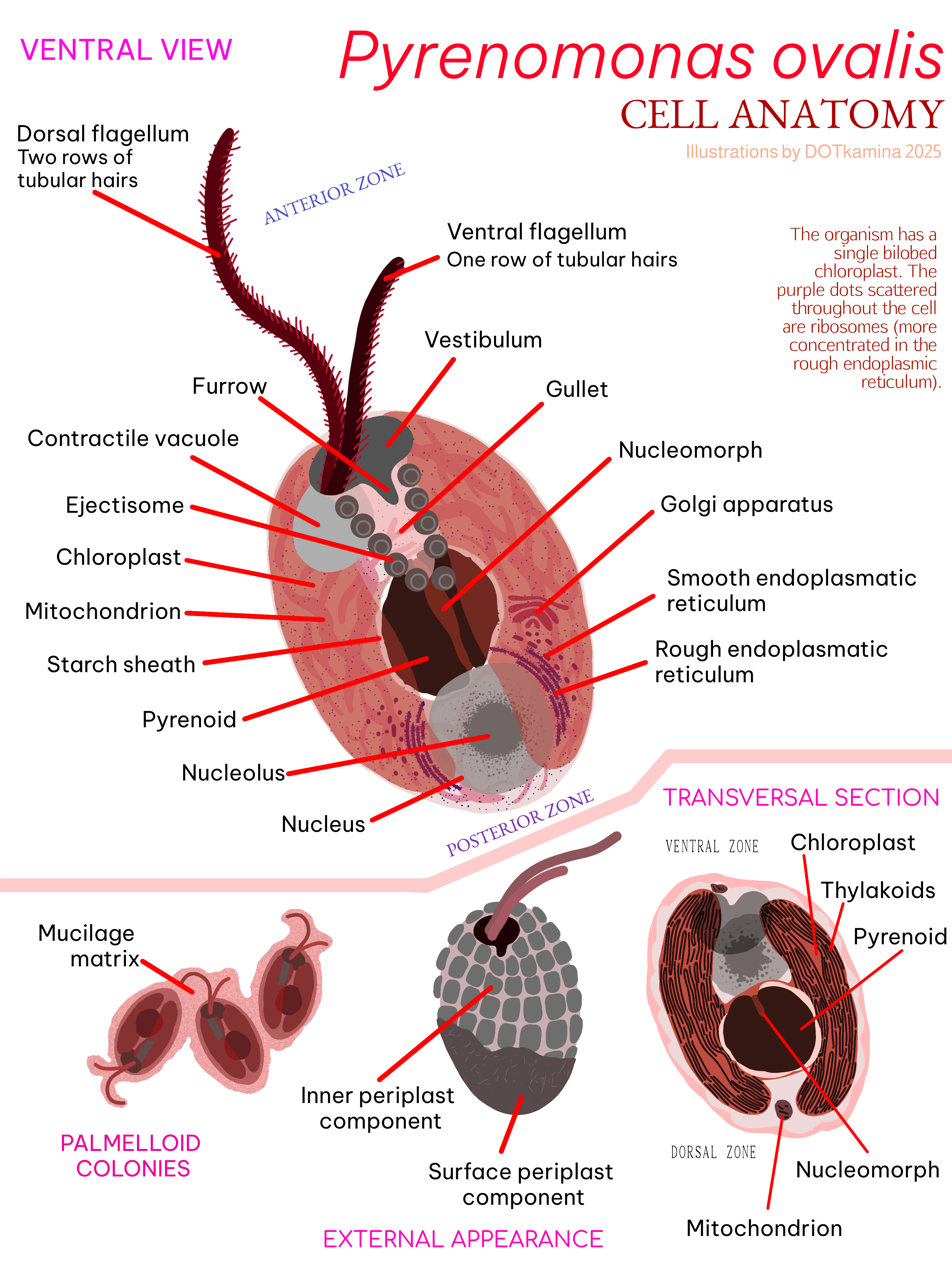
- Pyrenomonas ovalis. Cell anatomy representation, showing ventral view, palmelloid colony, external appearance (periplast) and transversal section.

Scientific classification
- Domain: Eukaryota
- Phylum: Cryptista
- Superclass: Cryptomonada
- Class: Cryptophyceae
- Order: Pyrenomonadales
- Family: Pyrenomonadaceae
- Genus: Pyrenomonas; Santore, 1984

Species
- P. helgolandii; P. ovalis

= Pyrenomonas =

Possibly invalid genus of single-celled organisms

Pyrenomonas is a genus of nomen nudum cryptomonad. It is a red alga with a bilobed chloroplast and a central pyrenoid, which has an invagination that houses a nucleomorph.

Pyrenomonas salina, the type species, was characterized in 1984 but has since been renamed to Rhodomonas salina. According to AlgaeBase, Pyrenomonas would only encompass two recognized species: Pyrenomonas helgolandii U.Santore and Pyrenomonas ovalis P.Kugrens, B.L.Clay & R.E.Lee, 1999. The following species are considered synonyms of the accepted names:

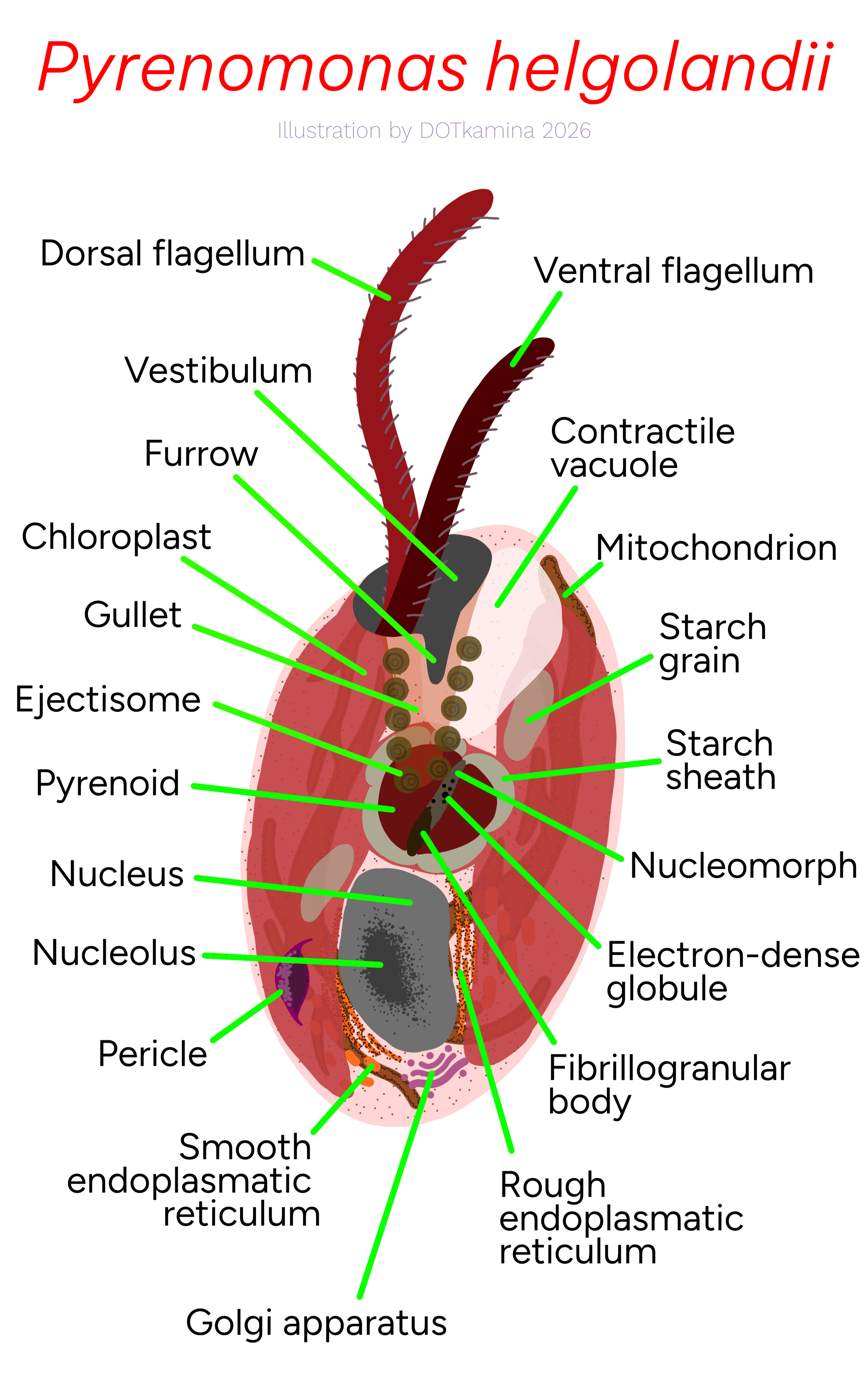
Pyrenomonas helgolandii.

- Pyrenomonas abbreviata (Butcher) Santore, 1986. Synonym of: Rhodomonas abbreviata (Butcher) D.R.A.Hill & Wetherbee.
- Pyrenomonas heteromorpha Santore, 1986. Synonym of: Rhodomonas heteromorpha Butcher ex D.R.A.Hill & R.Wetherbee.
- Pyrenomonas maculata Santore, 1986. Synonym of: Rhodomonas maculata D.R.A.Hill & Wetherbee.
- Pyrenomonas reticulata (I.A.N.Lucas) U.J.Santore, 1986. Synonym of: Rhinomonas reticulata (I.A.N.Lucas) G.Novarino.
- Pyrenomonas salina (Wisłouch) Santore, 1984. Synonym of: Rhodomonas salina (Wisłouch) D.R.A.Hill & R.Wetherbee.
