= Telonema =

Scientific classification
- Domain: Eukaryota
- Phylum: Telonemia
- Class: Telonemea
- Order: Telonemida
- Family: Telonemidae
- Genus: Telonema; Griessmann, 1913

Type species
- Telonema subtile Griessmann, 1913

Other species
- T. antarcticum Thomsen 2005 (now at Lateronema)

Genus of single-celled organisms

Telonema is a genus of single-celled organisms.

Some sources group Telonema within the cryptomonads-haptophytes assemblage. It is assigned to a unique phylum, Telonemia. Although Telonema is within the Eukaryota Domain, it does not have any close relations to other organisms within that domain. However, it was once thought Telonema was closely related to photosynthetic cryptomonads, or stramenopiles and centrohelids, but there was not enough data to prove this. After a study of 127 genes across 72 species, they found that Telonema subtile could be related to Alveolata and Rhizaria.

== Species ==
Two species are recognized by AlgaeBase as of 2013, Telonema subtile and T. antarcticum (moved to genus Lateronema). The latter was described in 2005.

Other sources call the former Telonema subtilis.
