= Hatena =

Hatena (はてな) is a Japanese term meaning question. It may refer to:

- Hatena arenicola, a species of single-celled eukaryotes
- Hatena (company), an internet services company in Japan
