= Plants+HC clade =

Plants+HC clade is a group of eukaryotes proposed by Burki et al. (2008).

It includes:

- Plants
- Hacrobia (the "HC" refers to Cryptophyta and Haptophyta, the two major members of this group)

== See also ==
- photosynthesis
