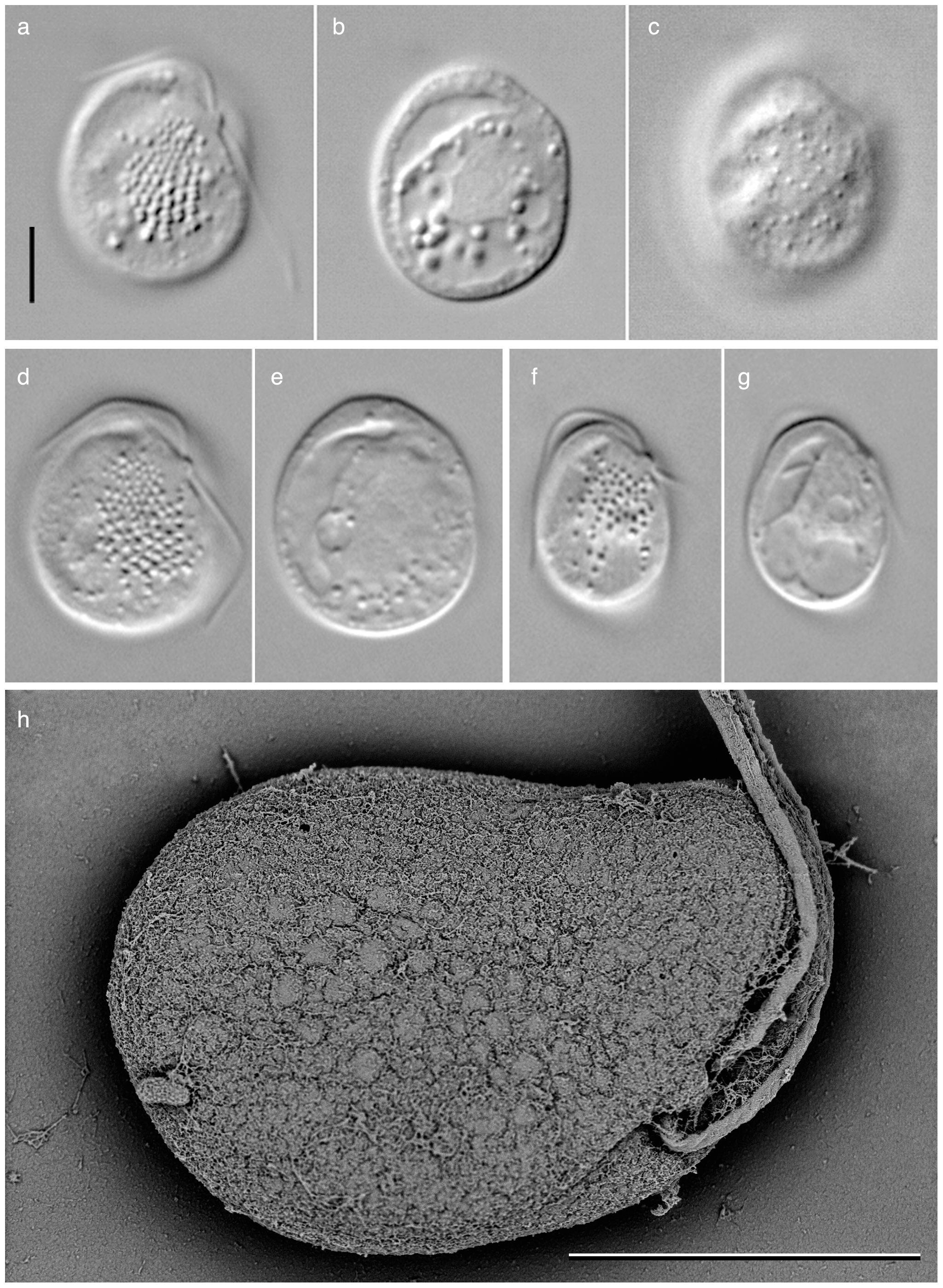
- Light (above) and transmission electron micrographs (below) of R. truncata

Scientific classification
- Domain: Eukaryota
- Phylum: Cryptista
- Class: Leucocryptea
- Order: Kathablepharidida
- Family: Kathablepharidae
- Genus: Roombia; Okamoto et al., 2009
- Species: R. truncata

Binomial name
- Roombia truncata Okamoto et al., 2009

= Roombia =

Genus of single-celled organism

Roombia truncata is a species of katablepharids, which are heterotrophic single-celled organisms.

It was the first katablepharid to be generally available in cell culture, starting around 2009. The culture consists of Roombia, the diatom Navicula, and unidentified bacteria. Navicula provides the main food source for Roombia, although Roombia also feeds on the bacteria.

Roombia truncata was identified through SSU rRNA gene analysis as a typical component of eukaryotes however its complete set of RNA transcripts show mgR2-like CCr (Light sensitive ion channel) unlike other cryptists within this branch of the eukaryotic tree of life.

Roombia was named after the Roomba robotic vacuum cleaner.
