= Kathablepharis =

Scientific classification
- Domain: Eukaryota
- Clade: Pancryptista
- Phylum: Cryptista
- Class: Leucocryptea
- Order: Kathablepharida
- Family: Kathablepharidae
- Genus: Kathablepharis; Skuja 1939

Type species
- Katablepharis phoenikoston Skuja 1939

Genus of single-celled organisms

Kathablepharis (alternative spelling Katablepharis) is a genus of single-celled eukaryotes comprising five to six species. They are heterotrophic and live in both freshwater and seawater. They have two flagella and a feeding apparatus consisting of a mouth and two arrays of microtubules (one inside the other).

== Etymology ==
It derives its name from the Greek words κατά (kata) (downwards) and βλεφαρίς (blepharis) (eyelash).

== Species ==
This is a partial list.

- K. japonica Okamoto & Inouye 2005
- K. obesa Barlow & Kugrens 2002
- K. tenuis Barlow & Kugrens 2002
- K. hyalurus Skuja 1939
- K. notonectoides Skuja 1948
- K. oblonga Skuja 1939
- K. ovalis Skuja 1948
- K. phoenikoston Skuja 1939
- K. remigera (Vørs 1992) Clay & Kugrens 1999 [Leucocryptos remigera Vørs 1992]
