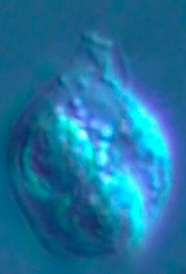
- Telonema rivulare by interference contrast micrography

Scientific classification
- Domain: Eukaryota
- Clade: Diaphoretickes
- Phylum: Telonemia; Shalchian-Tabrizi in Shalchian-Tabrizi et al. 2006
- Class: Telonemea; Cavalier-Smith 1993
- Order: Telonemida; Cavalier-Smith 1993
- Family: Telonemidae; Cavalier-Smith 1993

Genera
- Arpakorses; Lateronema; Telonema; Microkorses; Hyaliora

Diversity
- 10 species

= Telonemid =

Phylum of single-celled organisms

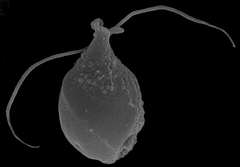
Electron micrograph of T. rivulare

Telonemia is a phylum of microscopic eukaryotes commonly known as telonemids. They are unicellular free-living flagellates with a unique combination of cell structures, including a highly complex cytoskeleton unseen in other eukaryotes.

Telonemia shares several distinctive features with the related SAR supergroup. Among these features are cortical alveoli, small sacs beneath the cell's surface that act as cushions, providing support and helping to maintain the cell's shape. Additionally, they possess tripartite mastigonemes, complex three-part hair-like structures on their flagella, the whip-like tails used for movement. These structures enhance their swimming capabilities by increasing resistance against water. Furthermore, Telonemia is equipped with filopodia, very thin, thread-like projections extending from the cell body. These projections can serve various purposes, such as aiding in movement or capturing food particles by wrapping around them. Together, the two lineages compose the proposed TSAR clade, although other analyses resolve telonemids near Haptista instead.

This phylum is monotypic, composed of a single class Telonemea, order Telonemida and family Telonemidae. It is classified in three genera and seven species, although numerous undescribed clades of environmental DNA are known. They are detected in all marine and freshwater environments, where they prey on bacteria and small phytoplankton by engulfing them in their plasma membrane (phagotrophy).

== Morphology ==
The phylum Telonemia comprises microscopic unicellular eukaryotes, or protists. Most of the diversity of telonemids is morphologically uncharacterized. The few described species are free-living predatory phagotrophic flagellates composed of pear-shaped cells with two flagella. These cells measure approximately 5–10 μm in length and 3–7 μm in width. The flagella have different lengths, with the short one measuring up to 12 μm and the long one measuring up to 16 μm. Between the flagella protrudes a short proboscis-like structure, known as a rostrum. Their mitochondrial cristae are tubular. They have a unique multi-layered cytoskeleton of high complexity, composed of layers of microfilaments and microtubules, unseen in any other eukaryote. They exhibit a unique combination of cell traits that were previously believed to be exclusive to different chromalveolate groups, such as complex tripartite mastigonemes (as in stramenopiles), cortical alveoli-like structures (as in alveolates) and filopodia (as in rhizarians). Despite their evolutionary proximity to chromalveolates, they lack chloroplasts.

== Ecology and distribution ==
Telonemids feed on a wide range of organisms, namely bacteria and phytoplankton ranging in size between pico- and nanoplankton. They are widely distributed and are sometimes abundant, implying they may play an important ecological role in aquatic ecosystems. Around one hundred clades of environmental sequences from undescribed telonemids have been recovered in a variety of marine locations (Antarctic, Arctic and Indian Oceans; Mediterranean, Baltic, Kara, Marmara and White seas), including deep sea, and freshwater bodies from different regions (Norway, France, Antarctica, Finland, Canada, Japan). Several telonemid clades favor open waters with lower nutrients, such as the Canada Basin and offshore the Mackenzie River, suggesting that they are able to thrive in low-productivity ecosystems (i.e. oligotrophic).

== Systematics ==
=== History ===
The first telonemid genus and species, Telonema subtile, was described by Karl Griessmann in 1913 from crude cultures of the green alga Ulva and of red algae off the coast of Roscoff and Naples. Eighty years later, in 1993, American protistologist Thomas Cavalier-Smith created a family Telonemidae, order Telonemida and class Telonemea to contain this protist. Initially, this group was included within the now obsolete phylum Opalozoa, along with other unrelated groups of flagellates such as apusomonads, jakobids, cercomonads, spongomonads, katablepharids, ebriids, proteomyxids and so on. In this scheme, the class Telonemea was distinguished by the presence of two posterior cilia of equal length (isokont cilia). It contained an additional order besides Telonemida, Nephromycida, which comprised the genus Nephromyces (later treated as an apicomplexan). In 2005 a second species of telonemid was described, T. antarcticum, from the surface waters of the Oslofjord.

Since 2006, Telonemea was separated into a new eukaryotic phylum Telonemia by protistologist Kamran Shalchian-Tabrizi and coauthors, on the basis of phylogenetic analyses that placed it near chromalveolate groups such as Haptista and Cryptista. However, in 2015, Cavalier-Smith and coauthors rejected their treatment as an independent phylum and transferred Telonemea to the phylum Cryptista, under the obsolete subphylum Corbihelia. This subphylum included other protists with a pharyngeal basket or radiating axopodia such as Picomonas (later classified as a separate phylum Picozoa closely related to red algae) and Microheliella (now proposed as the sister group to Cryptista). In addition, they transferred T. antarcticum to a new genus Lateronema, on the basis of phylogenetic distance from Telonema.

Numerous phylogenetic analyses in the following years resolved the position of Telonemia as the sister clade to the SAR supergroup, collectively composing the TSAR clade (Telonemia, Stramenopila, Alveolata and Rhizaria), which led Cavalier-Smith to finally consider Telonemia a separate phylum in 2022. In the same year, five more species and a third genus, Arpakorses, were described by protistologist Denis Victorovich Tikhonenkov and coauthors.

=== Classification ===
Until 2019, only two species had been formally described, although DNA sequences collected from seawater suggested there were many more species not yet described. In 2022, five additional species were described along with a third new genus. In 2025, an additional three species and two genera were described, bringing the total number of species to ten.

- Lateronema Cavalier-Smith 2015
  - Lateronema antarctica (Thomsen 2005) Cavalier-Smith 2015 [Telonema antarctica Thomsen 2005]
- Telonema Griessmann 1913
  - Telonema blandense Mostazo-Zapata, Gàlvez-Morante & Richter 2025
  - Telonema papanine Zagumyonnyi & Tikhonenkov 2022
  - Telonema subtile Griessmann 1913 [Telonema subtilis Griessmann 1913]
  - Telonema tenere Belyaev, Borodina & Tikhonenkov 2022
  - Telonema rivulare Prokina & Tikhonenkov 2022
- Arpakorses Tikhonenkov & Karpov 2022
  - Arpakorses versatilis Borodina, Karpov, Zagumyonnyi, Belyaev, Prokina & Tikhonenkov 2022
  - Arpakorses idiomastiga Borodina, Karpov, Zagumyonnyi, Belyaev, Prokina & Tikhonenkov 2022
- Hyaliora Mostazo-Zapata, Gàlvez-Morante & Richter 2025
  - Hyaliora molinica Mostazo-Zapata, Gàlvez-Morante & Richter 2025
- Microkorses Zlatogursky in Zlatogursky et al. 2025
  - Microkorses curacao Zlatogursky in Zlatogursky et al. 2025

== Evolution ==
Telonemia on the eukaryote tree of life

- Eukaryotes
  - Diaphoretickes
    - - TSAR
        - SAR
          - - Stramenopiles
            - Alveolata
          - Rhizaria
        - ?
          **Telonemia**
      - - Haptista
        - ?
          **Telonemia**
    - Disparia
    - - Cryptista
      - Archaeplastida
  - Other eukaryotes

Cladogram of eukaryotes based on 2024-2025 phylogenomic studies, showing in bold the two possible positions of Telonemia. This phylum and its relatives, SAR and Haptista, are embedded within the larger clade Diaphoretickes, which includes archaeplastids.

Telonemia is a clade of protists that branch independently from other eukaryotic supergroups groups as their own 'micro-kingdom'. Early molecular analyses of Telonemia placed them as an independent branch within the SAR supergroup, a diverse clade of eukaryotes that contain Rhizaria, Alveolata and Stramenopila. Other analyses proposed a close relationship with centrohelids, katablepharids, cryptomonads and haptophytes. At this time, they were suggested to have evolutionary significance in being a possible transitional form between ecologically important heterotrophic and photosynthetic species among chromalveolates.

Several phylogenetic studies place telonemids as sister to the SAR supergroup in a clade known as TSAR. Other studies do not recover the TSAR clade and find telonemids to branch within or sister to Haptista, albeit with moderate support. Telonemids are morphologically complex organisms that combine characteristics of different SAR lineages. The main trait uniting each SAR lineage has been described in at least one telonemid genus: tripartite mastigonemes in the flagella, typical of stramenopiles and described in Lateronema; cortical alveoli underneath the plasma membrane, typical of alveolates and described in Lateronema; and fine pseudopodia (filopodia), typical of rhizarians and described in Telonema. Moreover, Arpakorses presents a kinetid structure similar to that seen in Rhizaria, and Telonema subtile presents microtubules in a formation superficially resembling the apical complex of apicomplexans.

All telonemid genera possess a highly intricate multi-layered cytoskeleton, whose complexity is not found in any other eukaryote. This finding may indicate that telonemids have retained an ancestral cytoskeleton organization that has been lost in other eukaryotes.
