= Patronage (disambiguation) =

Patronage is the support, encouragement, privilege, or financial aid that an organization or individual bestows to another.

Patronage may also refer to:

- Patronage in ancient Rome, the relationship in ancient Roman society between the patronus ('patron') and their cliens ('client')
- Patronage (transportation) or ridership, a statistical quantity of passengers
- Patronage (novel), an 1814 novel by Maria Edgeworth
- Spoils system or patronage system
- Ius patronatus or right of patronage in Roman Catholic canon law
- Patronage, the practice of appointing a parish clergyman in the Church of England; see advowson
- Patronage, the practice of appointing a parish clergyman in the Church of Scotland; see Church Patronage (Scotland) Act 1711

== See also ==
- Patron god
- Patron saint
