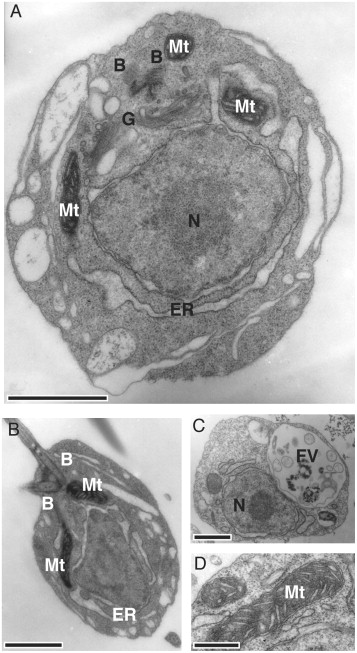

Scientific classification
- Domain: Eukaryota
- Supergroup: Cryptista
- Class: Palpitea
- Order: Palpitida
- Family: Palpitomonadidae; Cavalier-Smith, 2012
- Genus: Palpitomonas; Yabuki and Ishida, 2010
- Species: P. bilix

Binomial name
- Palpitomonas bilix Yabuki and Ishida, 2010

= Palpitomonas =

Genus of protists

Palpitomonas is a genus of biflagellated protists within the phylum Cryptista, a clade of basal eukaryotes. This genus is especially significant for understanding the early evolution of mitochondria, flagella, and the broader cryptist lineage. Palpitomonas is a key model organism for studying the phylogenetic origins of mitochondria and eukaryotic motility structures, such as flagella. One of the most common species in the genus of Palpitomonas is Palpitomonas bilix, which has been used in genomic and phylogenetic studies due to its special mitochondrial genome structure and basal phylogenetic position.

== Introduction ==
Palpitomonas is an important organism for research on the origins of eukaryotic life. Palpitomonas bilix possesses several unique characteristics that are rare in the other eukaryotes, characterized by its small size, biflagellate structure, and unique mitochondrial. The genus Palpitomonas belongs to Cryptista, which includes other simple eukaryotic organisms like cryptophytes and katablepharids. As a bacterivore Palpitomonas plays an ecological role in regulating microbial populations and nutrient cycling in marine ecosystems by feeding on bacteria and become a prey for larger microorganism

== Taxonomy and classification ==
The genus Palpitomonas is part of the Cryptista phylum, which itself is situated within the Diaphoretickes supergroup. Cryptista is a basal group of eukaryotes whose members are primarily aquatic and flagellated. The phylum Cryptista, as part of Diaphoretickes, shares a common ancestor with other early-diverging eukaryotic groups, including the Archaeplastida and the SAR supergroup (Stramenopiles, Alveolata, Rhizaria). Classification of Palpitomonas has evolved over time as molecular phylogenetic has revealed its position as one of the earliest-diverging eukaryotic lineages, particularly among the flagellated protists.

The genus Palpitomonas is closely related to other genera of Cryptista, including the kathablepharids and cryptophytes, but its specific evolutionary path remains an area of ongoing study. Molecular phylogenetic analyses, particularly those involving ribosomal RNA (rRNA) sequences and protein-coding genes, have demonstrated that Palpitomonas is a basal lineage within Cryptista, with close related to the early-diverging mitochondrial ancestors of other eukaryotes.

== Phylogenetic position ==
Phylogenetic analyses based on multigene datasets have shown Palpitomonas bilix is basal within the Cryptista clade, diverging before cryptophytes and katablepharids. Its unique position in the eukaryotic tree makes it instrumental for studying the divergence of eukaryotic lineages. Palpitomonas is also part of broader studies that question the monophyly of Hacrobia, suggesting complex evolutionary relationships among early-diverging protists. Phylogenetic studies with 157-gene alignments have reinforced its position as a basal cryptist, adding clarity to its relationship with other protists such as cryptophytes.

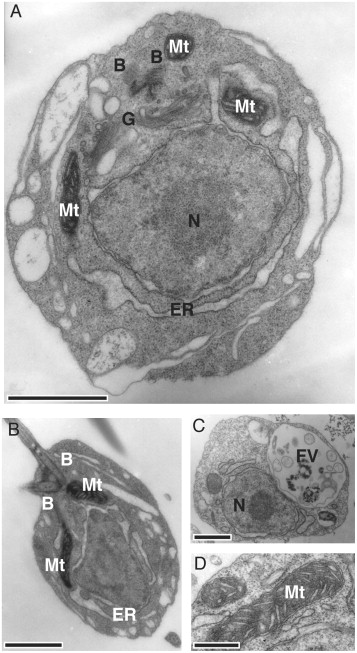
Electron micrographs of Palpitomonas bilix gen. et sp. nov. N, nucleus; ER, endoplasmic reticulum; Mt, mitochondrion; G, Golgi apparatus; B, basal body; FV, food vacuole.

== Morphology ==
Palpitomonas bilix, the primary species in this genus, has a distinctive morphology. Cells are small, approximately 3-8 micrometers, with two lateral flagella that different in function and position. The anterior flagellum is highly active, but the posterior flagellum trails passively, helping the organism's characteristic "wobbling" motion. This biflagellate structure is significant for movement and feeding. Each cell is vacuolated with no cell wall allowing for flexibility. The mitochondria of Palpitomonas contain flat cristae, similar to those found in other cryptists, although distinct from the tubular cristae of Katablepharida.

Ultrastructural analysis shows a single mitochondrion with lobed extensions and an endoplasmic reticulum surrounding the nucleus. A Golgi apparatus is located between the nucleus and flagella, and two microtubular roots support the basal bodies. The anterior flagellum of Palpitomonas possesses mastigonemes—bipartite hair-like structures that aid in movement and feeding by creating a current that draws in food particles. Electron microscopy has shown that Palpitomonas does not has ejectosomes an organelle used for rapid ejection of cell contents, which is present in cryptophytes but absent in katablepharids and Palpitomonas. This lack of ejectosomes and other features further distinguishes Palpitomonas from other cryptists.

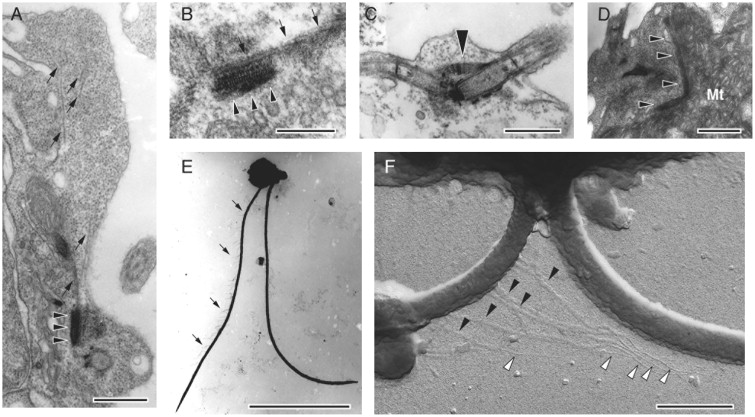
Electron micrographs of Palpitomonas bilix gen. et sp. nov.

== Mitochondrial genome and cytochrome c maturation ==
Palpitomonas bilix has a distinctive mitochondrial genome, organized as a linear DNA molecule with large inverted repeats at both ends. This linear mitochondrial genome structure, unusual among eukaryotes, is thought to have evolved independently in several lineages. It contains genes related to cytochrome c maturation (System I), a system inherited from bacterial ancestors. While related cryptists such as cryptophytes and kathablepharids utilize a different cytochrome c maturation system (System III), Palpitomonas retains the ancestral System I, making it an important model for studying mitochondrial evolution in eukaryotes.

== Ecological role ==
Palpitomonas play an ecological role in marine environment, as a bacterivore by consuming bacteria provide the regulation of bacterial populations and helping in nutrient cycling within microbial communities. As well as its role as prey for larger microorganisms, ecologically Palpitomonas importance in maintaining ecosystem balance in marine environment.

== Evolutionary role ==
The combination of basal features in Palpitomonas, such as its linear mitochondrial genome and ancestral cytochrome c maturation system, make it an important organism for understanding evolutionary in eukaryotes. Position within Cryptista and Hacrobia and its early diverging lineage provide insights into the development of mitochondria, cellular structures, and other eukaryotic traits.

== History ==
Palpitomonas bilix was first described in 2010 by Yabuki et al. after being isolated from marine environments near Palau. Observations of its ultrastructure and phylogenetic analyses based on multiple genes led to its classification as a novel genus within Cryptista. This discovery provided new insights into early eukaryotic diversity and clarified the evolutionary links between Cryptista and other early-diverging groups. Palpitomonas remains valuable for studying the diversity of early eukaryotic cells.

== Structure ==
Palpitomonas has several vacuoles and an extensive endoplasmic reticulum that surrounding nucleus. Its mitochondria have lobed shape, and the Golgi apparatus located near the flagella processes proteins. The flagellum that moves actively is covered with small hair-like structures called mastigonemes. Unlike other cryptists, P. bilix does not possess ejectosomes, the ejective organelles characteristic of cryptophytes and some kathablepharids.

== Life cycle ==
Palpitomonas reproduces asexually (binary fission) by dividing into two cells. This simple method of reproduction allows Palpitomonas populations to grow quickly in favorable conditions. Unlike other eukaryotes, Palpitomonas does not reproduce sexually, which limits its genetic diversity. However, this basic life cycle reflects its ancient place in eukaryotic history and shares similarities with other early-diverging eukaryotes.
