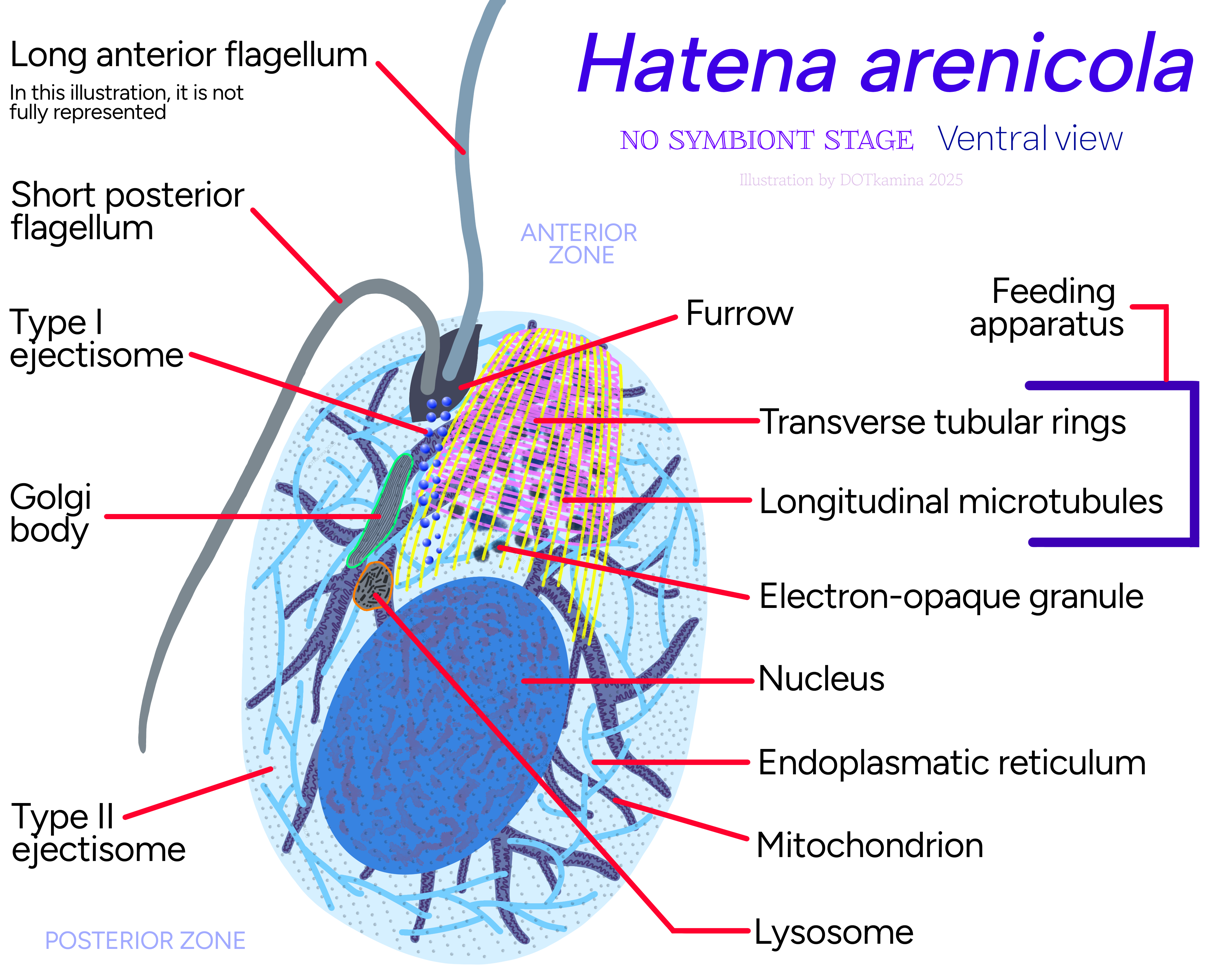
- Hatena arenicola, no symbiont stage
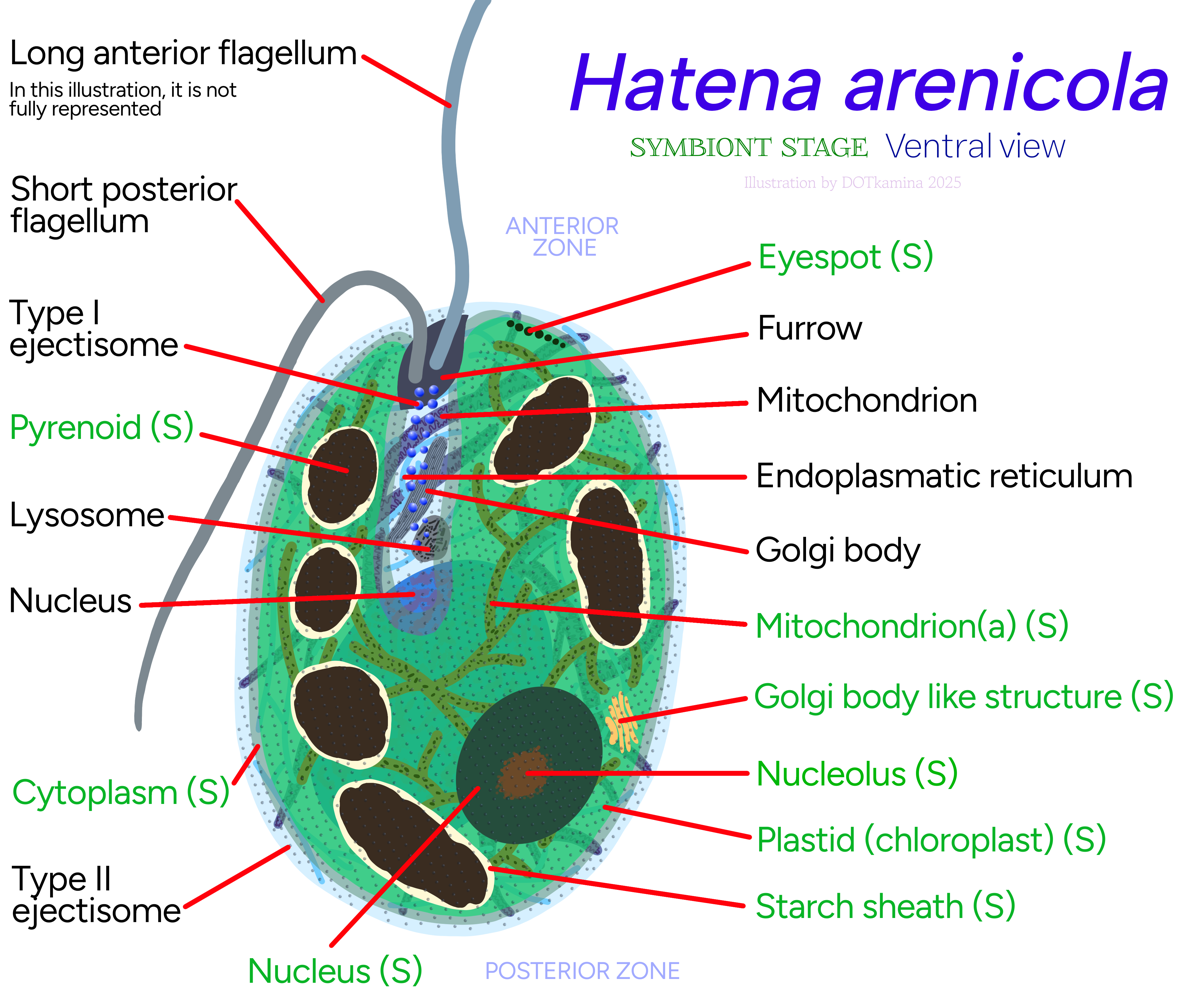
- Hatena arenicola, with Nephroselmis symbiont

Scientific classification
- Domain: Eukaryota
- Class: Kathablepharidea
- Order: Kathablepharidida
- Family: Kathablepharidae
- Genus: Hatena; Okamoto and Inouye, 2006
- Species: H. arenicola

Binomial name
- Hatena arenicola Okamoto and Inouye, 2006

= Hatena arenicola =

Species of single-celled organism

Hatena arenicola is a species of single-celled eukaryotes discovered in 2000, and first reported in 2005. It was discovered by Japanese biologists Noriko Okamoto and Isao Inouye at the University of Tsukuba, and they gave the scientific description and formal name in 2006. The species is a flagellate, and can resemble a plant at one stage of its life, in which it carries a photosynthesizing alga inside itself, or an animal, acting as predator in another stage of its life. Researchers believe that this organism is in the process of secondary endosymbiosis, in which one organism is incorporated into another, resulting in a completely new life form.

== Discovery ==
H. arenicola was first noticed as algal bloom in 2000 from Isonoura beach in Japan. It was found in the area of moderately sheltered sandy shore, where a number of algae surfaced during tsunami. The specimens were present in the upper edge of the seepage face. It can be found throughout the year, except in winter. It was originally believed to be a new green alga. However, it was discovered that the chlorophyll-bearing plastids were independent of the cell division, indicating that they were separate but temporary endosymbiotic organisms.

== Description ==
H. arenicola is a protist with one rounded cell having two flagella for locomotion. It feeds on algae using a complex feeding tube when it leads an independent life. The feeding tube, however, is replaced by an endosymbiotic alga. The algal endosymbiont is a green alga from the genus Nephroselmis. The endosymbiont not only acts as feeding apparatus, but also as an eye spot, by which it probably helps the protist for directional movements towards light (phototaxis).

H. arenicola cannot divide without containing the endosymbiont. But, unlike a fully integrated organelle, the Nephroselmis alga does not divide along with the host cell. When the host cell divides, one of the daughter cells receives the Nephroselmis cell and the other daughter returns to a heterotrophic lifestyle. Hence, the mother protist gives rise to green-coloured and white-coloured daughter cells. The latter behaves like a predator until it ingests a Nephroselmis green alga. The alga then loses its flagella and cytoskeleton, while the Hatena, now a host, switches to photosynthetic nutrition, gains the ability to move towards light and loses its feeding apparatus. Thus, the protist exhibits an unusual life cycle of alternating autotrophy and heterotrophy.

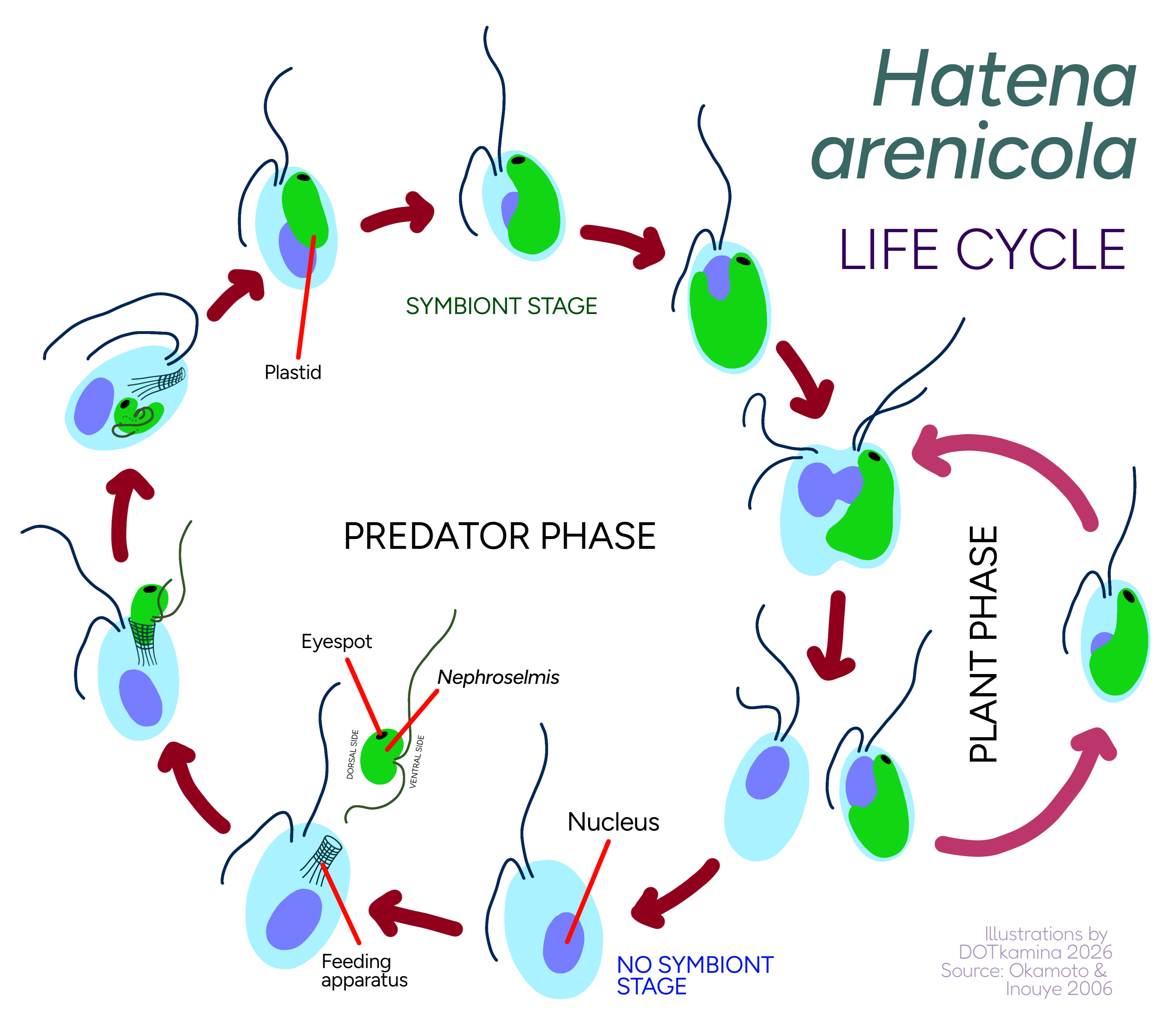
Life cycle

Genetic sequencing (of 18S rRNA gene) revealed that the protist can harbour at least three distinct strains of Nephroselmis rotunda.

The generic name is from a Japanese interjection roughly meaning "enigmatic" or "unusual".

=== The symbiont ===
The symbiotic Nephroselmis is different from the free-living form. It retains its cytoplasm, nucleus and plastid, while other organelles including mitochondria, Golgi body, cytoskeleton, and endomembrane system are degraded. The plastid is also comparatively enlarged up to ten times the normal size of free-living form. The enlarged plastid is compensated by reduced cytoplasmic components.

== See also ==
- Endosymbiotic theory
