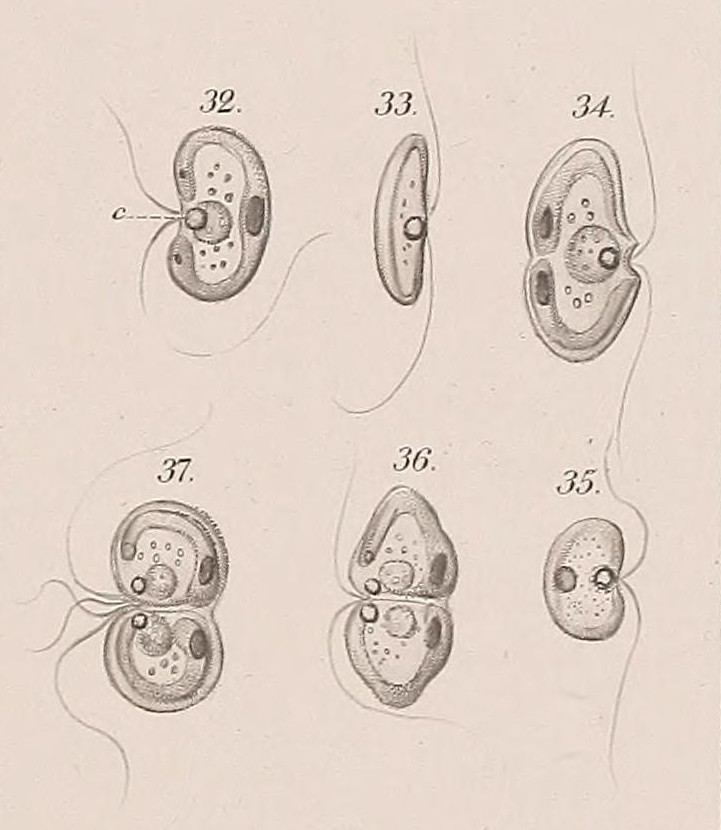
- Nephroselmis olivacea

Scientific classification
- Domain: Eukaryota
- Clade: Archaeplastida
- Clade: Viridiplantae
- Division: Chlorophyta
- Class: Nephrophyceae
- Order: Nephroselmidales
- Family: Nephroselmidaceae
- Genus: Nephroselmis; Stein

Type species
- Nephroselmis olivacea Stein

Species
- Nephroselmis astigmatica; Nephroselmis intermedia; Nephroselmis minuta; Nephroselmis olivacea; Nephroselmis pyriformis; Nephroselmis rotunda; Nephroselmis spinosa; Nephroselmis viridis

= Nephroselmis =

Genus of algae

Nephroselmis is a genus of green algae. It has been placed in the family Nephroselmidaceae, although a 2009 study suggests that it should be separated into its own class, Nephroselmidophyceae. One species can be an endosymbiont of Hatena arenicola.

== Morphology ==
The cell body is right-left flattened. On the ventral side are two heterodynamic unequal flagella; the shorter beats towards the anterior direction while the long trails behind. Nephroselmis have a single cup-shaped chloroplast that contains an eyespot in its anterior-ventral edge below the short flagellum and a pyrenoid with starch plates. A vacuole is located in the left-anterior side, and the nucleus is located in the right-posterior side. The flagellar root system consists of a rhizoplast and three microtubular roots, one of which is multilayered.

The cell's surface area is covered with layers of unminerallized scales, while the surface of the flagella has hairs as well. The cell body surface is covered by two to four layers of body scales. Flagella are covered with at least two scale layers, the second is characteristically rod-shaped. On top of that Nephroselmis has either a third layer of flagellar scales or flagellar pit scales.

The morphology of the scales are an important taxonomic characteristic for differentiating between the species. In the case of Nephroselmis spinosa, that exhibits some distinctive morphological characteristics, one of them is a unique outer scale type that has a spine that is extended for about 1 μm, is slightly curved and has a hook shape at the end.

== Symbiosis with Hatena arenicola ==
A unique symbiosis occurs between the katablepharid Hatena arenicola and Nephroselmis rotunda. One of the interpretations to the observations of their interaction is that this symbiosis stage is leading to a secondary endosymbiosis, which will produce a completely new life form.

This symbiosis is distinct from other reported cases of ongoing symbiosis in that the symbiont plastid is selectively enlarged up to ten times than the normal size.

There is a possibility that retention of Nephroselmis-derived compartments is a precondition of the cell division process of H. arenicola, due to the fact that cell division was only observed in H. arenicola individuals after they have incorporated the N. rotunda parts into their cell body.

== Ecology ==
The genus Nephroselmis according to reports and documentations done until 2009 appears to have global worldwide distribution. All species of Nephroselmis are marine inhabitants except for Nephroselmis olivacea which is found strictly in freshwater environments.

The biofuel production potential of strains of Nephroselmis under certain treatments was examined in a research published in April 2022 concluding with - "isolated Nephroselmis sp. KGE2 is a candidate microalgal for biodiesel production using AMD as an iron source. The proposed process can be useful in overcoming the bottlenecks of microalgae cultivation. This can make the commercialization of biofuels economically feasible, and the products can be an alternative to fossil-derived commodities with zero carbon emissions."

Nephroselmis is known to be mixotrophic: in addition to photosynthesis, it consumes bacteria by phagocytosis.

== Life cycle ==
The life cycle that is found throughout the species of genus Nephroselmis is haplontic.

=== Cell division ===
Documented cell division of Nephroselmis astigmatica shows division by longitudinal binary fission.

=== Sexual reproduction ===
Observations of sexual reproduction in genus Nephroselmis are only known and were documented in the species Nephroselmis olivacea. This species is also the only one in the genus that is known to be found in freshwater. The sexual mating mechanism is isogamous heterothallic, The two gamete types are plus and minus, they are morphologically similar but have different roles during the mating process. The minus gamete attaches to the substratum, The plus gamete attaches to the dorsal side of the minus gamete by the base of the flagella of the plus gamete.

== Phylogeny and taxonomy ==
Nephroselmis is monophyletic and repeatedly appears in phylogenetic analysis results as an early divergent of the core chlorophytes. Therefore the genus is phylogenetically important to understand the early evolution of Chlorophyta.

According to a 2021 paper Nephroselmis appeared as one of the earliest branching clades from the core chlorophytes. Yet the relationships between Nephroselmis to its sister groups is yet to be resolved. "The three prasinophyte lineages Nephroselmis, Pycnococcus, and Picocystis (abbreviated NPP) branched as the closest relatives to the core chlorophytes", "The relationships between the NPP lineages are not fully resolved".

Earlier paper published in 2011 showed similar results - "The class Nephroselmidophyceae is considered to be situated in the early radiation of Chlorophyta, but the strict phylogenetic position is uncertain".

Family Nephroselmidaceae was put under the order Pseudoscourfieldiales, that consisted of it and Pseudoscourfieldiaceae. The order Nephroselmidales was proposed in 2007- "The morphological evolution within the genus Nephroselmis is discussed and the order Nephroselmidales is proposed".
