= Nicola J. Patron =

British plant scientist

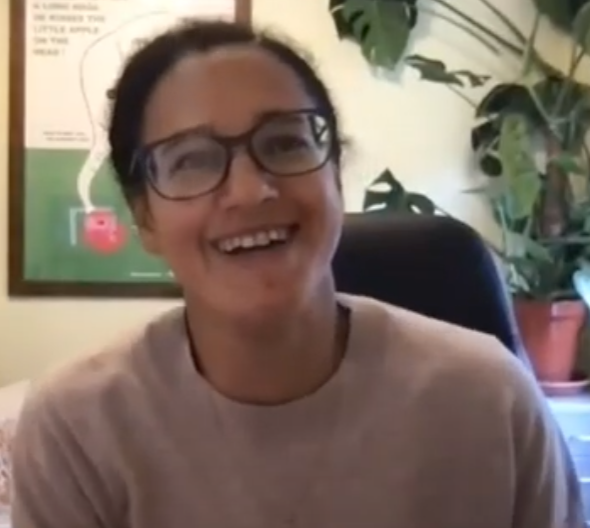
- In a Biomaker video in 2021
- Education: University of East Anglia
- Occupation: Botanist
- Employers: Earlham Institute; University of Cambridge

Nicola J. Patron is a plant scientist working in plant molecular and synthetic biology. She is a group leader and an associate professor at the University of Cambridge. Her research investigates how to use plants for more sustainable agriculture and biomanufacturing.

== Early life and education ==
Nicola J. Patron was awarded a PhD in plant molecular biology from the University of East Anglia (2006), studying recombination of viruses and viral transgenes.

== Career ==
Patron worked at both The John Innes Centre, UK and the University of British Columbia, Canada after gaining her doctorate. She was employed by Dow AgroSciences in Australia for 4 years from 2009 and then returned to the UK in 2013 to become head of synthetic biology at the Sainsbury Laboratory in Norwich. She became a group leader at the Earlham Institute in 2016. Between 2017 and 2023 she was Director of the institute's BioFoundry. Since 2024 Patron has been an associate professor at University of Cambridge in the Department of Plant Sciences.

In 2023 Patron co-founded Black in Plant Science to gather data about and support UK based plant scientists with Black heritage.

== Publications ==
Patron is the author or co-author of over 60 scientific publications. They include:

- Katharine Hubbard, Nicola Joan Patron, Jade Bleau & Yoselin Benitez-Alfonso (2024) Underrepresentation of Black and Asian students in UK plant science. Nature Plants 10 pages 1272–1275.
- D. Golubova, C. Tansley, H. Su and N.J. Patron (2024) Engineering Nicotiana benthamiana as a platform for natural product biosynthesis. Current Opinion in Plant Biology 81 102611.
- Carola Engler, Mark Youles, Ramona Gruetzner, Tim-Martin Ehnert, Stefan Werner, Jonathan D. G. Jones, Nicola J. Patron and Sylvestre Marillonnet (2014) A Golden Gate Modular Cloning Toolbox for Plants. ACS Systematic Biology 3 (11) pages 839 - 843.
- 54 authors including Nicola J. Patron (2006) Macronuclear genome sequence of the ciliate Tetrahymena thermophila, a model eukaryote. PloS Biology 4 (9) e286.

== Awards ==
Patron was awarded the Leonardo Da Vinci Invention and Technology Award by the State Government of Victoria for establishing targeted integration at a selectable locus in canola and the in 2006 the Luigi Provasoli Award from the Phycological Society of America.
