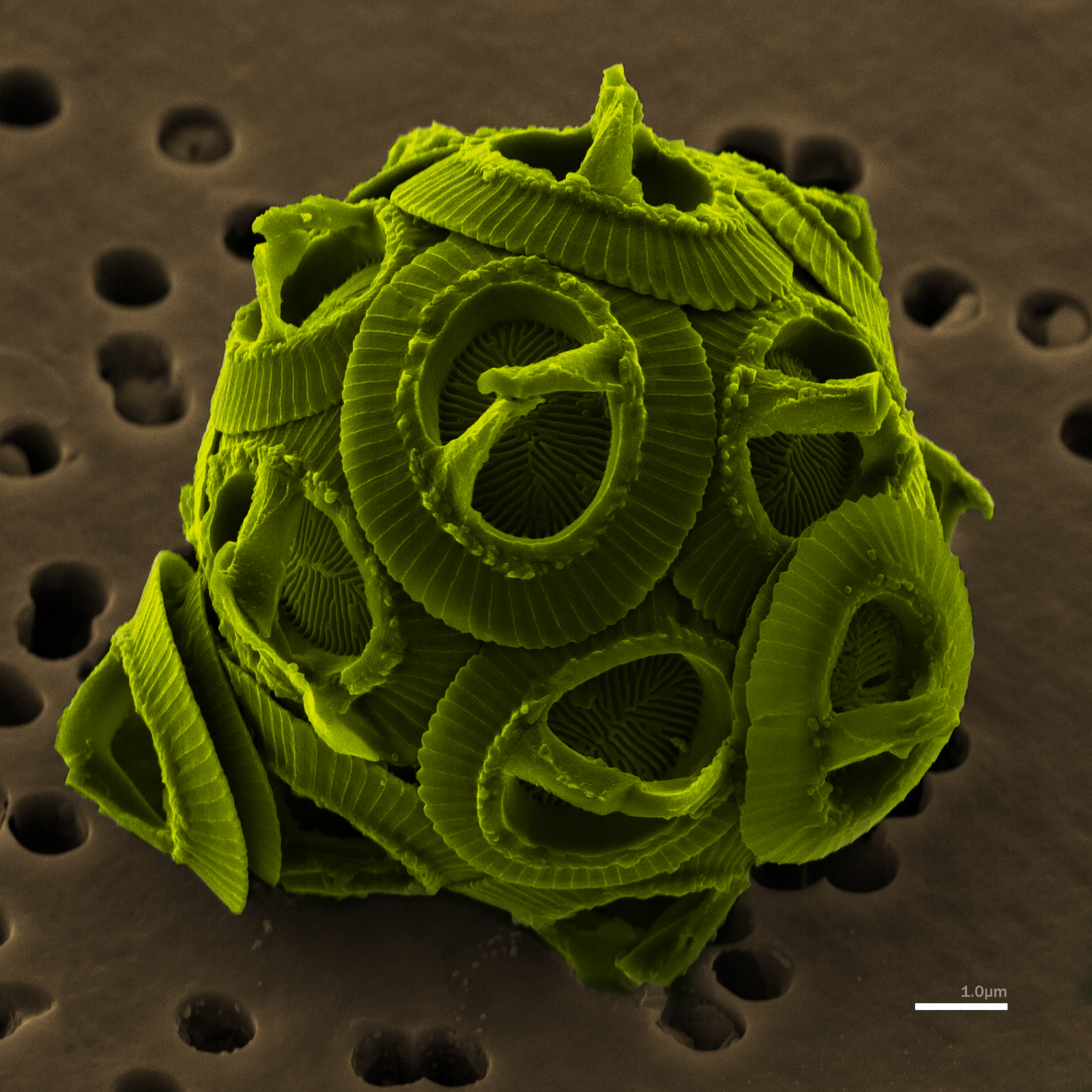
- The coccolithophore Gephyrocapsa oceanica

Scientific classification (obsolete as its monophyly is doubtful)
- Domain: Eukaryota
- Kingdom: Chromista
- Subkingdom: Hacrobia; Okamoto et al. 2009

Phyla
- Cryptista; Haptista

Synonyms
- CCTH; Eukaryomonadae

= Hacrobia =

Group of algae

The cryptomonads-haptophytes assemblage is a proposed but disputed monophyletic grouping of unicellular eukaryotes that are not included in the SAR supergroup. Several alternative names have been used for the group, including Hacrobia (derived from "ha-" referring to Haptophyta, "-cr-" referring to cryptomonads, and "-bia" as a general suffix referring to life); CCTH (standing for Cryptophyta, Centrohelida, Telonemia and Haptophyta); and Eukaryomonadae.

As of February 2012, it is unclear whether this group is monophyletic or not; results of phylogenetic studies are "often dependent on the selection of taxa and gene data set". Two 2012 studies produced opposite results.

== Members ==
In the past, heterokonts, haptophytes, and cryptomonads have sometimes been grouped together in a group known as chromists. Though the heterokonts are now split out, Cryptophyta and Haptophyta are considered in some studies to be closely related (and are sometimes simply referred to as the "Cryptophyta+Haptophyta" group). A 2009 paper suggested that the Telonemia and centrohelids may form a clade with the cryptophytes and haptophytes. The picobiliphytes may belong in this group but are too poorly known to be classified with confidence.

Several recent studies have concluded that Haptophyta and Cryptophyta do not form a monophyletic group. The former are a sister group to the SAR group, the latter cluster with the Archaeplastida (plants in the broad sense). As of February 2012, it remains unclear whether the Hacrobia forms a monophyletic group.

Another study suggested the following arrangement: centrohelids are related to haptophytes and form the clade Haptista; Haptista is the sister group to SAR; Cryptista are related to Archaeplastida; and Haptista + SAR is the sister clade to Cryptista + Archaeplastida.

== Phylogeny ==
Based on work done by Silar 2016.

- Hacrobia
  - - Alveidia
      Alveidea
    - Haptista
      - Centroheliozoa
        Centrohelea
      - Haptophytina
        - Rappemonada
          Rappephyceae
        - Haptomonada
          - Pavlovophyceae
          - Prymnesiophyceae
  - Cryptista s.l.
    - Corbihelia
      - Endohelia
        Endohelea
      - Corbistoma
        - Picomonadea
        - Telonemea
    - Cryptista s.s.
      - Palpitia
        Palpitea
      - Rollomonadia
        - Leucocrypta
          Leucocryptea
        - Cryptomonada
          - Goniomonadea
          - Cryptophyceae
