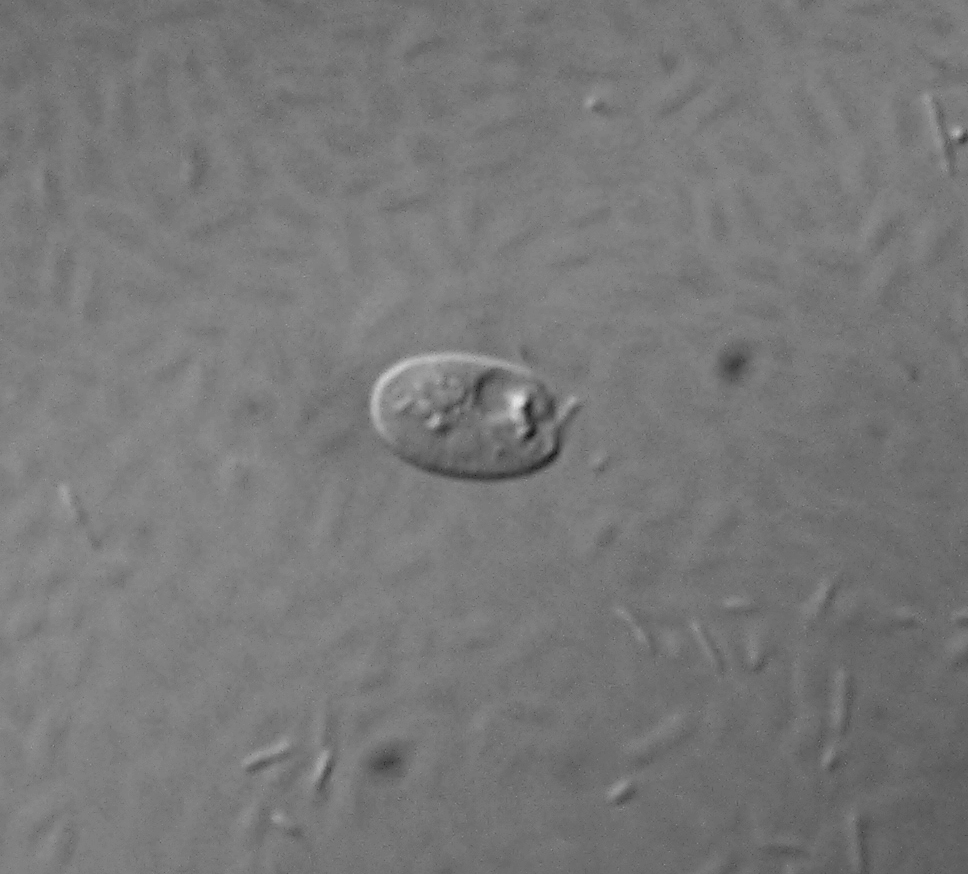
- Goniomonas sp.

Scientific classification
- Domain: Eukaryota
- (unranked): Hacrobia
- (unranked): Cryptista
- Superclass: Cryptomonada
- Class: Goniomonadea Cavalier-Smith 1993

Orders
- Goniomonadida; Hemiarmida

= Goniomonadea =

Class of algae

Goniomonadea is a proposed class of cryptomonads which includes the orders Goniomonadida and Hemiarmida.

== Taxonomy ==
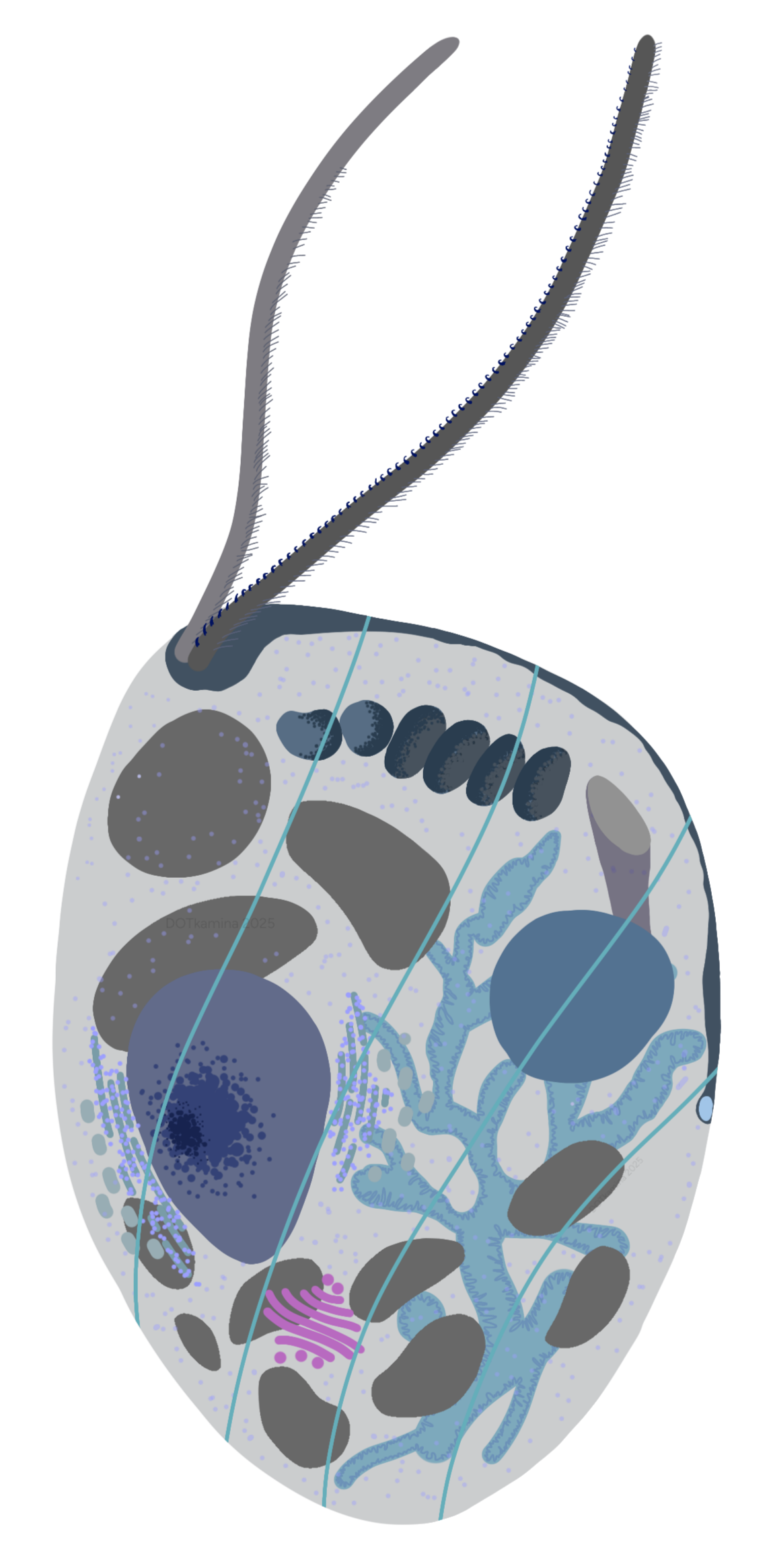
Goniomonas truncata

- Order Goniomonadida Novarino & Lucas 1993 [Goniomonadales Novarino & Lucas 1993]
  - Family Goniomonadidae Hill 1991 [Goniomonadaceae Hill 1991]
    - Genus Goniomonas von Stein 1878
- Order Hemiarmida Cavalier-Smith 2017
  - Family Hemiarmidae Cavalier-Smith 2017
    - Genus Hemiarma Shiratori & Ishida 2016
