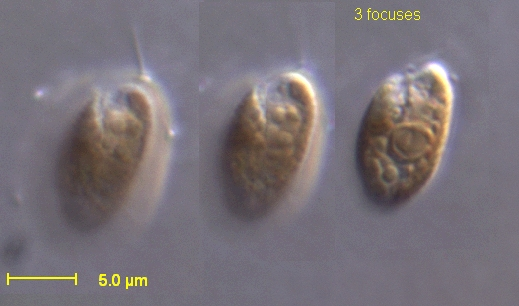
- Rhodomonas salina, a cryptomonad

Scientific classification
- Domain: Eukaryota
- Clade: Pancryptista
- Clade: Cryptista; Cavalier-Smith 1989, emend. 2015

Classes
- Endohelia; Endohelea; Palpitia; Palpitea; Rollomonadia; Cryptomonada; Cryptophyceae; Goniomonadea; Leucocrypta; Leucocryptea

= Cryptista =

Phylum of protists

Cryptista is a phylum of alga-like eukaryotes. It is most likely related to Archaeplastida, which includes plants and many algae, within the larger group Diaphoretickes.

Characteristic features of cryptomonad mtDNAs include large syntenic clusters resembling α-proteobacterial operons that encode bacteria-like rRNAs, tRNAs, and ribosomal protein genes. Additionally, they are an evolutionarily significant lineage found in mostly marine, glacial and freshwater environments.

Although it has sometimes placed along with Haptista in the subkingdom Hacrobia, within the kingdom Chromista, most recent studies have found that Hacrobia is not a clade. For example, in 2016, a broad phylogenomic study found that cryptists fall within the group Archaeplastida, while haptophytes are closely related to the SAR supergroup.

== Morphology ==
The ornamental structures of the cell membrane vary among cryptists. They also have varying flagellar appendages.

== Taxonomy ==
Based on studies done by Cavalier-Smith et al.

- Phylum Cryptista Cavalier-Smith, 1989 emend. 2015
  - Subphylum Endohelia Cavalier-Smith, 2022
    - Class Endohelea Cavalier-Smith in Yabuki et al., 2012 emend. Cavalier-Smith, 2022
  - Subphylum Palpitia Cavalier-Smith in Cavalier-Smith & Chao, 2012
    - Class Palpitea Cavalier-Smith in Cavalier-Smith & Chao, 2012
  - Subphylum Rollomonadia Cavalier-Smith, 2013
    - Superclass Cryptomonada Cavalier-Smith, 2004 stat. n. 2015
      - Class Cryptophyceae Fritsch in West & Fritsch, 1927
      - Class Goniomonadea Cavalier-Smith, 1993
    - Superclass Leucocrypta Cavalier-Smith, 2004 stat. n. 2015
      - Class Leucocryptea Cavalier-Smith, 2004

== Evolution ==
Last common ancestor of cryptists is thought to have naked cell membrane, mitochondrion with flat cristae, bipartite hairs and no ejectisomes. It employed phagocytosis, and maybe also photosynthesis.

=== Phylogeny ===
The phylogeny is based on studies done by Cavalier-Smith, Yazaki and others.

- Cryptista
  - Endohelia
    Endohelea
  - - Palpitia
      Palpitea
    - - Rollomonadia
        - Leucocrypta
          Leucocryptea
        - Cryptomonada
          - Cryptophyceae
          - Goniomonadea
