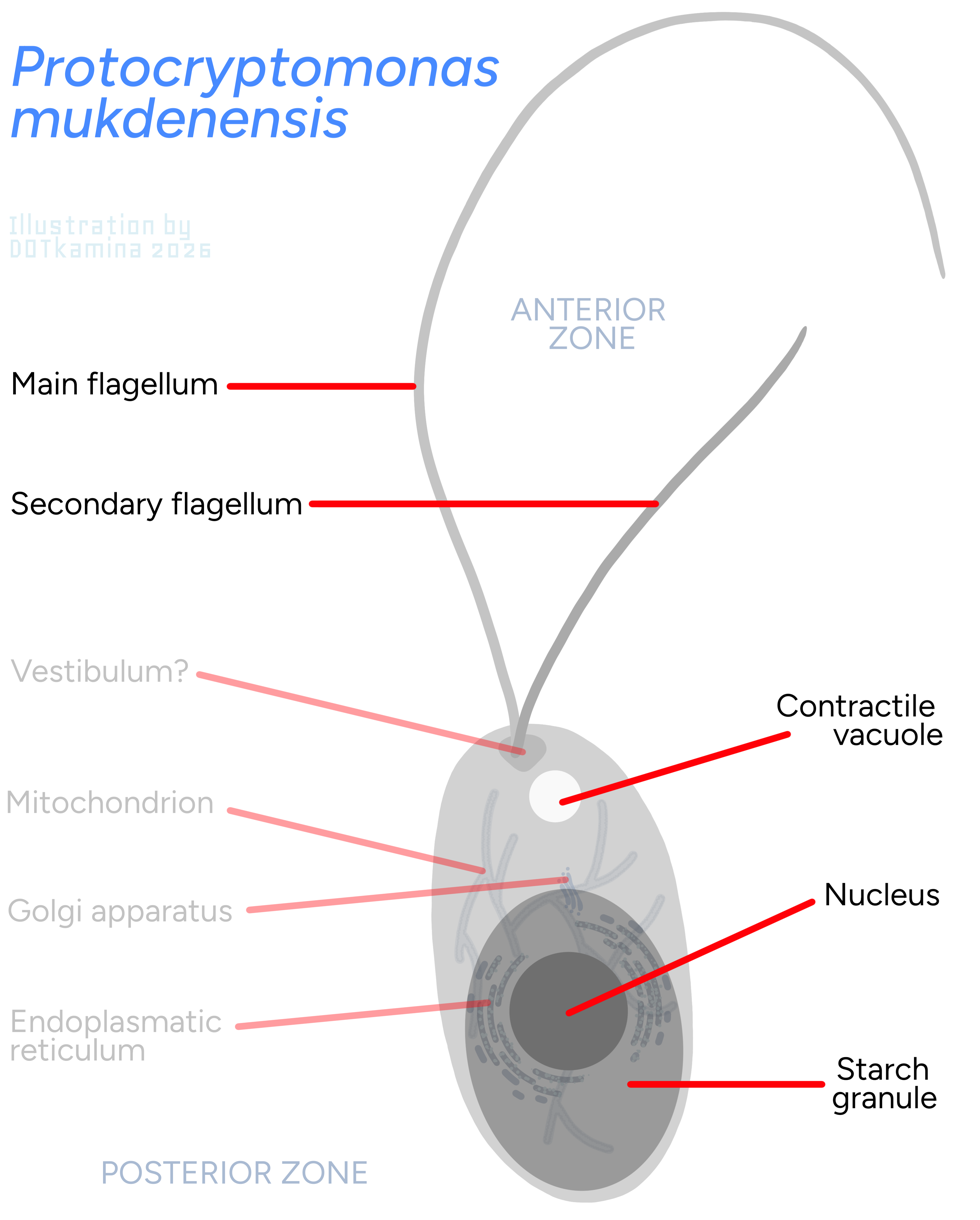

Scientific classification
- Domain: Eukaryota
- Phylum: Cryptista
- Superclass: Cryptomonada
- Class: Cryptophyceae
- Order: Cryptomonadales
- Family: Cryptomonadaceae
- Genus: Protocryptomonas
- Species: P. mukdenensis

Binomial name
- Protocryptomonas mukdenensis Skvortsov ex C.E.M.Bicudo 1989

= Protocryptomonas mukdenensis =

Species of single-celled cryptomonad alga

Protocryptomonas mukdenensis is the type species of the genus Protocryptomonas. Described by Skvortsov in 1960, it lacks chloroplasts, as in other Protocryptomonas species. Instead, it has a single, large starch granule, half the cell's length and almost as wide as the cell itself.

Aside from this, it shares other general characteristics of the genus, such as the contractile vacuole near the flagellar bases and the central nucleus. The primary flagellum is twice the cell's length, and the secondary flagellum is nearly the same length. It was found in a lake near Mukden (present-day Shenyang), and its distribution is inferred to be in Northeast China, Liaoning Province.
