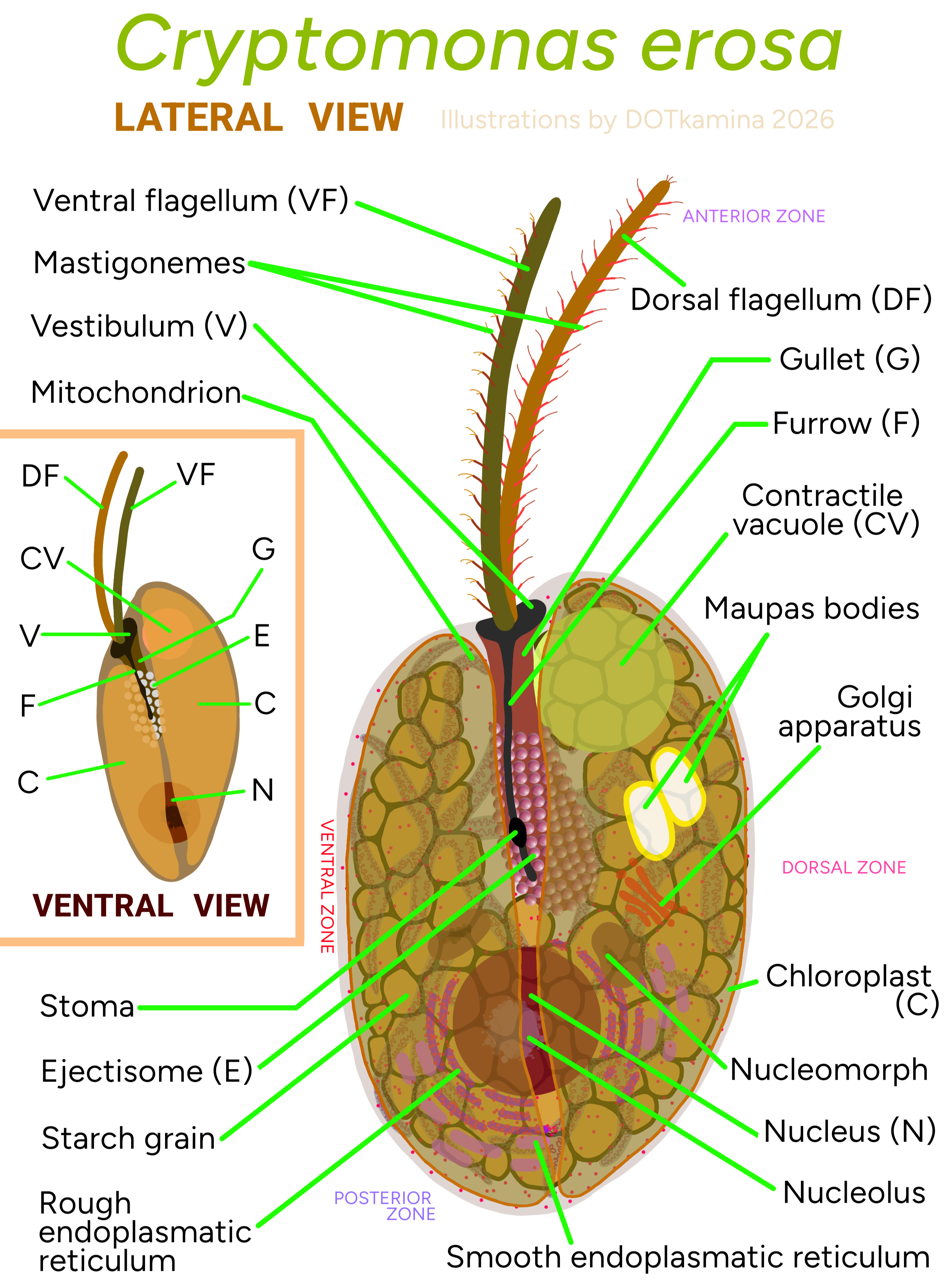

Scientific classification
- Domain: Eukaryota
- Clade: Pancryptista
- Phylum: Cryptista
- Superclass: Cryptomonada
- Class: Cryptophyceae
- Order: Cryptomonadales
- Family: Cryptomonadaceae
- Genus: Cryptomonas
- Species: C. erosa

Binomial name
- Cryptomonas erosa Ehrenberg 1832

= Cryptomonas erosa =

Species of single-celled organism

Cryptomonas erosa is a species of cryptomonad alga with a yellowish-brown to greenish coloration (olive). The cells of this species are oval or slightly elliptical, with a length of 13 to 45 µm, and a width of 6 to 26 µm.

== Description ==
The dorsal side of the cell is convex, while the ventral side is barely covered or completely flat. This gives the cell an asymmetrical shape.

The nucleus is located at the posterior end of the cell, and the contractile vacuole is located at the anterior end. It has two flagella. It possesses two chloroplasts without pyrenoids. Starch grains, oval or polygonal in shape, are distributed throughout the cell. The gullet extends to the first half of the cell and does not extend beyond it. There are two maupas bodies.
