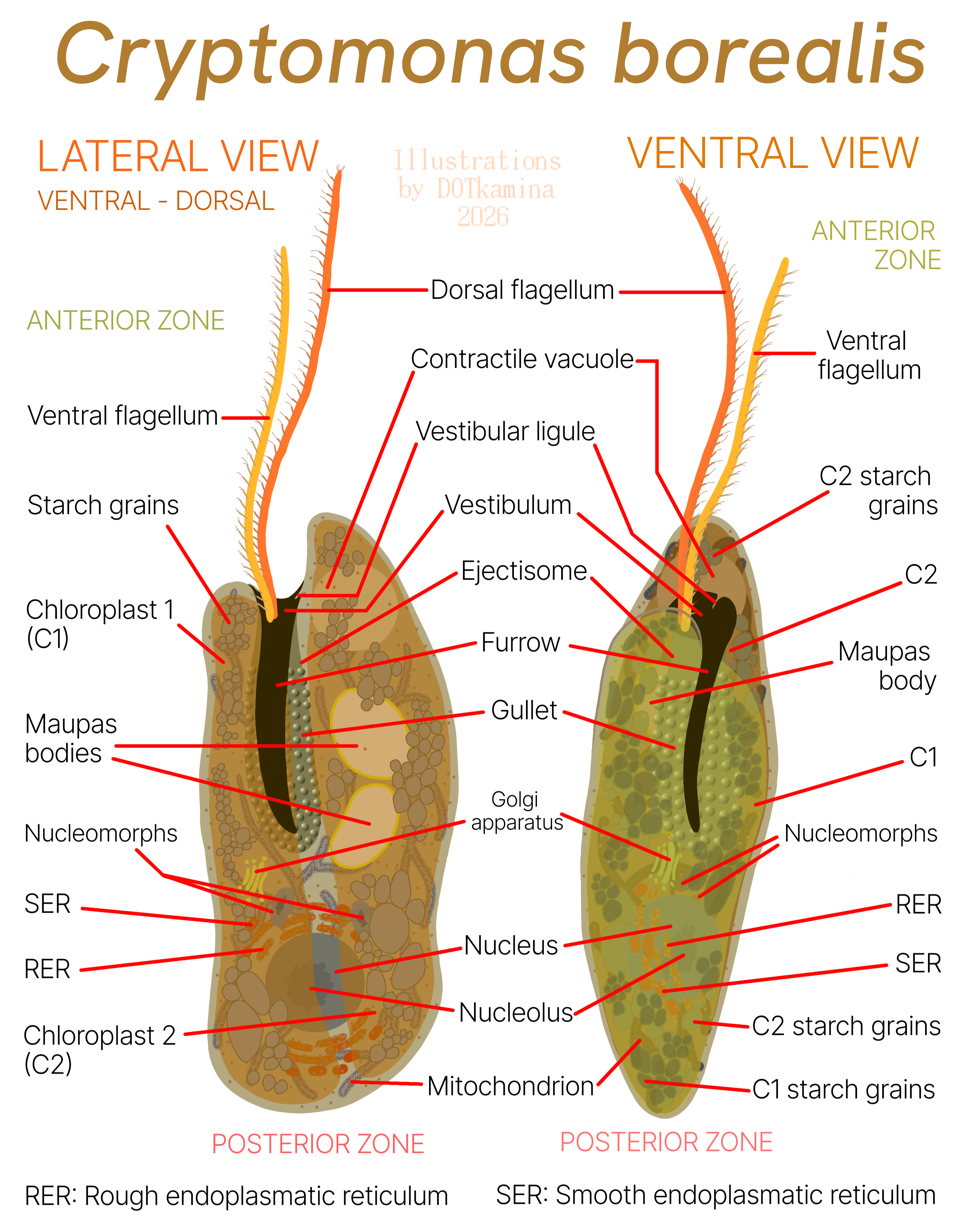

Scientific classification
- Domain: Eukaryota
- Division: Cryptophyta
- Class: Cryptophyceae
- Order: Cryptomonadales
- Family: Cryptomonadaceae
- Genus: Cryptomonas
- Species: C. borealis

Binomial name
- Cryptomonas borealis Skuja 1956

= Cryptomonas borealis =

Species of single-celled cryptomonad alga

Cryptomonas borealis is a species of cryptomonad alga. The cell has an irregular oval shape, as if it had undulations. The gullet mouth is large, giving the anterior region of the cell the appearance of a "fish mouth".

== Description ==
The length of C. borealis ranges from 30 to 58 µm. It has two chloroplasts that can vary in color from brownish to olive green. It may have one to three Maupas bodies. The contractile vacuole is located near the apical rostrum. The nucleus is located posteriorly. It lacks pyrenoids. Instead, the chloroplasts have abundant hexagonal or oval starch grains. The gullet extends to about half the length of the cell body.

C. borealis is morphologically related to C. curvata and C. platyuris. Among its various synonyms is C. skujae.
