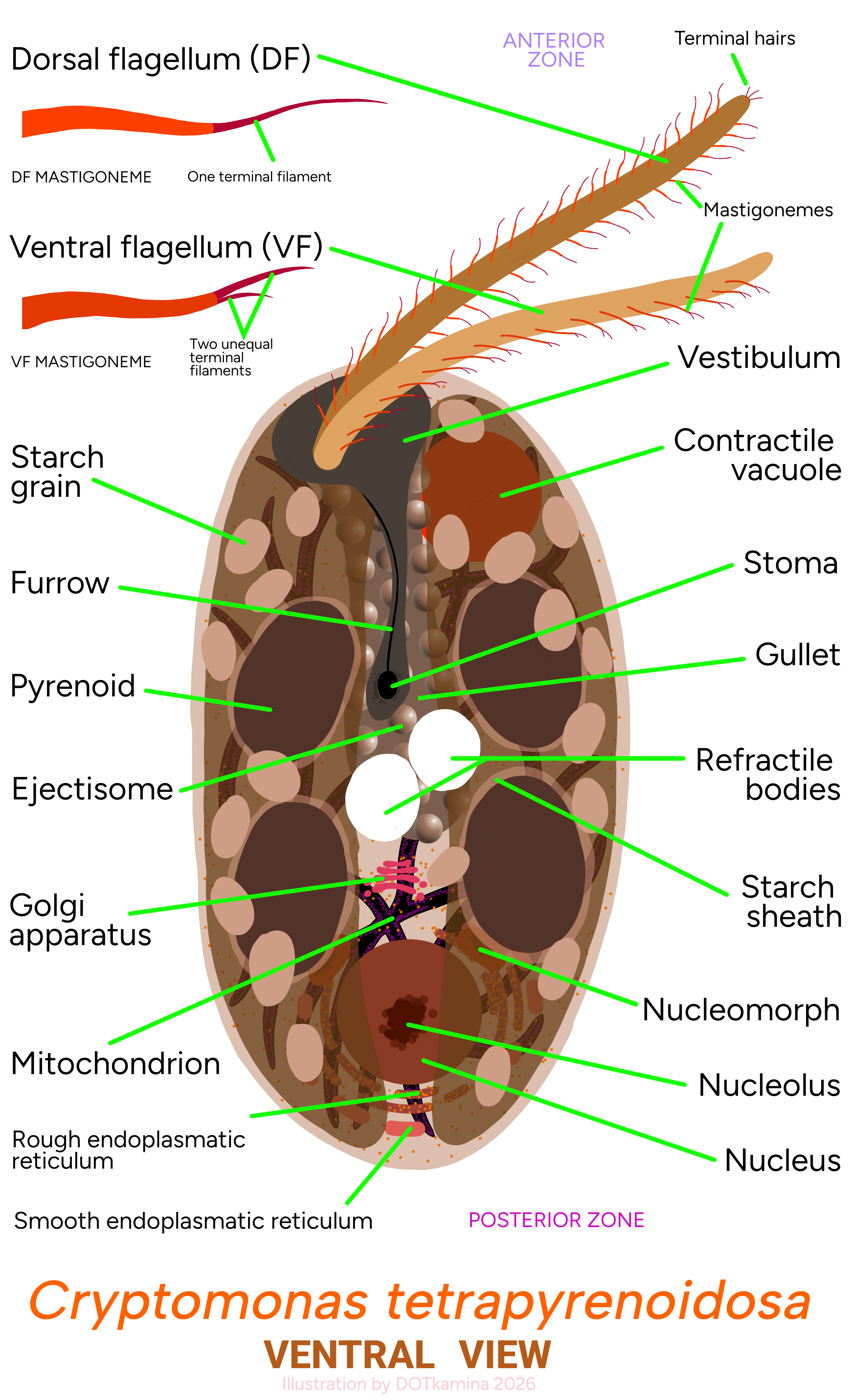

Scientific classification
- Domain: Eukaryota
- Phylum: Cryptista
- Superclass: Cryptomonada
- Class: Cryptophyceae
- Order: Cryptomonadales
- Family: Cryptomonadaceae
- Genus: Cryptomonas
- Species: C. tetrapyrenoidosa

Binomial name
- Cryptomonas tetrapyrenoidosa Skuja, 1948

= Cryptomonas tetrapyrenoidosa =

Species of single-celled organism

Cryptomonas tetrapyrenoidosa is a species of cryptomonad alga. It has two chloroplasts, each with two pyrenoids, for a total of four, although this total can be six or seven. Starch granules are distributed throughout the cell. The flagella are of type 1, where the shorter flagellum has a single row of mastigonemes, and the longer flagellum has two rows. Two refractile bodies are located in the center of the cell.

The dimensions seem to vary depending on the author. According to Clay (2015): 20–60 µm long, 10–27 µm wide, 5–17 µm depth. According to Protist Information Server (2018): 16–25 µm long, 8–13 µm wide, 7–12 µm thick. According to Choi et al. (2013): 16–22 µm long.
