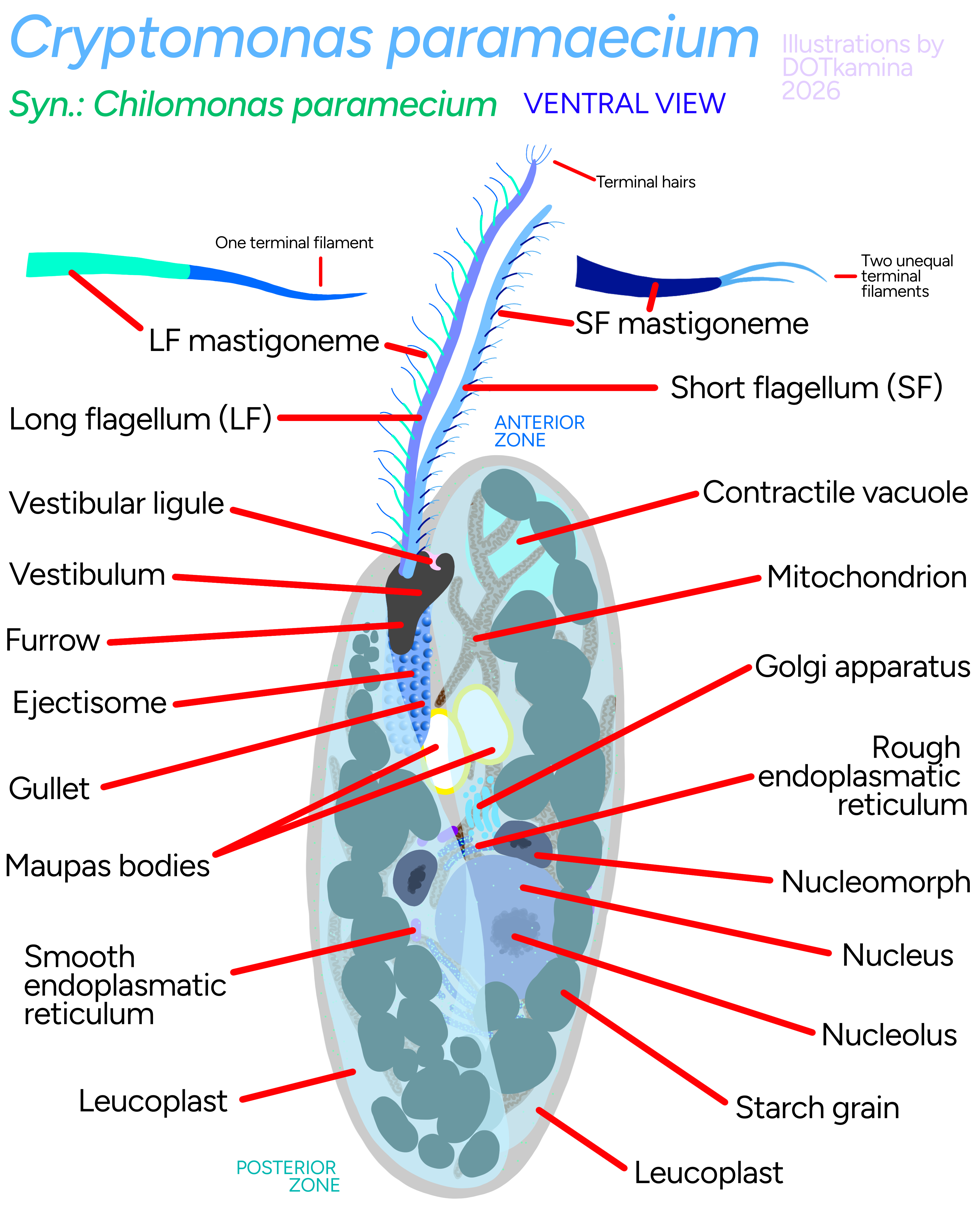

Scientific classification
- Domain: Eukaryota
- Phylum: Cryptista
- Superclass: Cryptomonada
- Class: Cryptophyceae
- Order: Cryptomonadales
- Family: Cryptomonadaceae
- Genus: Cryptomonas
- Species: C. paramaecium

Binomial name
- Cryptomonas paramaecium (Ehrenberg) Hoef-Emden & Melkonian 2003

= Cryptomonas paramaecium =

Species of single-celled organism

Cryptomonas paramaecium is a species of colorless cryptomonad alga. Previously it was considered the type species of the genus Chilomonas (as Chilomonas paramaecium Ehrenberg 1831).

== Dimensions ==
Cell size values vary depending on the source: 14–28 µm long × 10–13 µm wide × 8–10 µm thick; or 20–40 µm long and 10–20 µm in diameter.

== Description ==
It has a campylomorph shape, with an ovate-elongated sigmoid cell, and a simple furrow without a stoma. It lacks chloroplasts, instead possessing two leucoplasts (which are pigment-free, hence their transparency). It lacks pyrenoids but does contain several starch grains. The contractile vacuole is located in the anterior region of the cell. The flagella are of type IV, where the long flagellum has a single row of mastigonemes with a single terminal filament, and the short flagellum also has a single row of mastigonemes, but each mastigoneme has two unequal terminal filaments.
