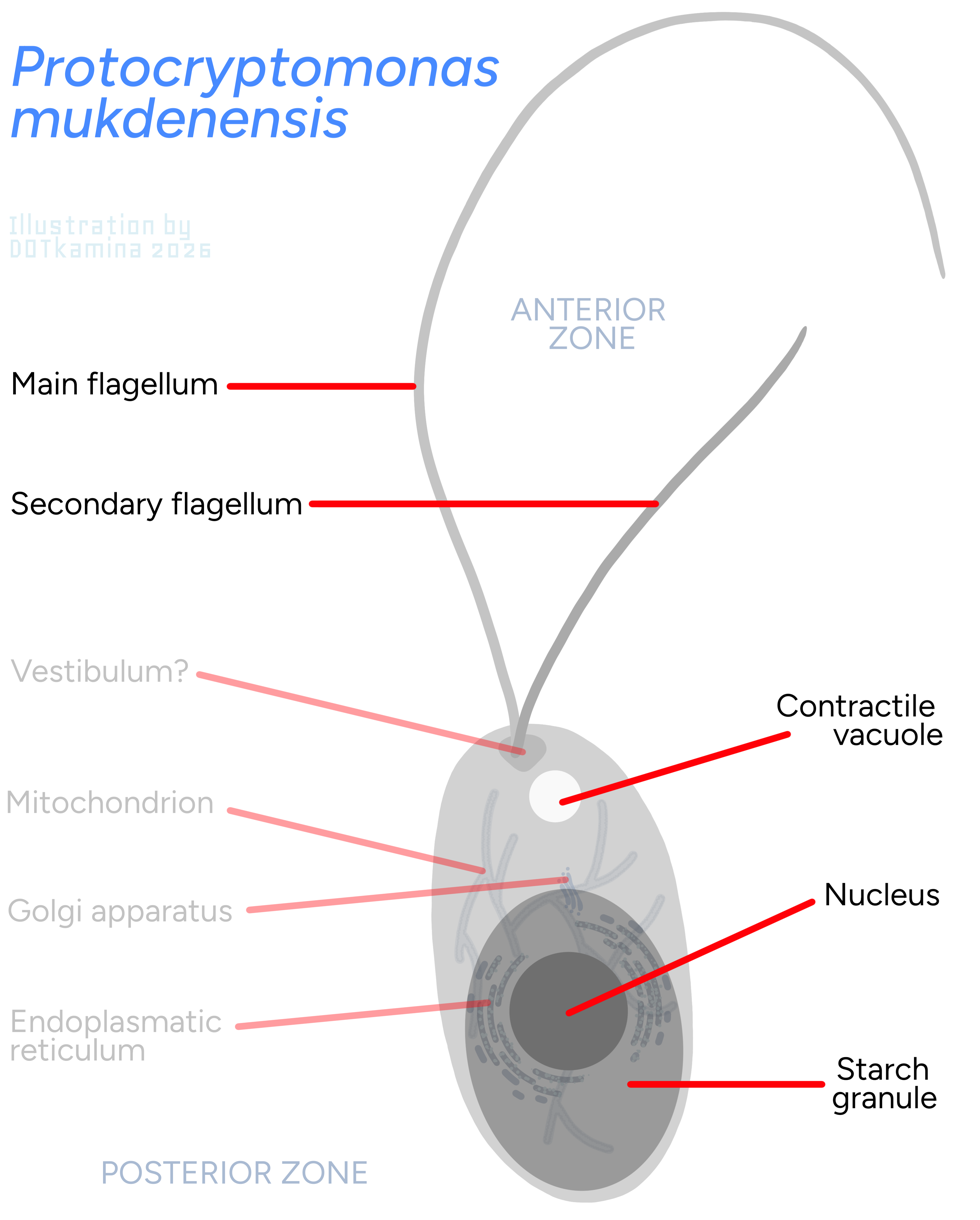
- Cell anatomy of P. mukdenensis

Scientific classification
- Domain: Eukaryota
- Division: Cryptophyta
- Class: Cryptophyceae
- Order: Cryptomonadales
- Family: Cryptomonadaceae
- Genus: Protocryptomonas; Skvortsov ex C.E.M.Bicudo, 1989

Type species
- Protocryptomonas mukdenensis Skvortsov ex C.E.M.Bicudo, 1989

Species
- Protocryptomonas acuta A.Castro, C.E.M.Bicudo & D.C.Bicudo, 1992; Protocryptomonas chilomonoides Skvortzov ex A.Castro, C.E.M.Bicudo & D.C.Bicudo, 1992; Protocryptomonas ellipsoidea Skvortsov, 1969; Protocryptomonas mukdenensis Skvortsov ex C.E.M.Bicudo, 1989; Protocryptomonas sygmoidea A.Castro, C.E.M.Bicudo & D.C.Bicudo, 1992

= Protocryptomonas =

Genus of single-celled organisms

Protocryptomonas is a genus of cryptomonad algae related to Cryptomonas. The taxonomic certainty of this genus remains uncertain due to the lack of type specimens and photographic evidence of the organism in life; only illustrations exist as validating evidence for the genus.

== Taxonomic history ==
This genus appeared in a compilation article on microalgae from China by Skvortsov in 1960, where only illustrations of two species, P. mukdenensis and "P. obovatus," were included, but the author did not indicate the existence of type specimens (i.e., actual specimens preserved anywhere).

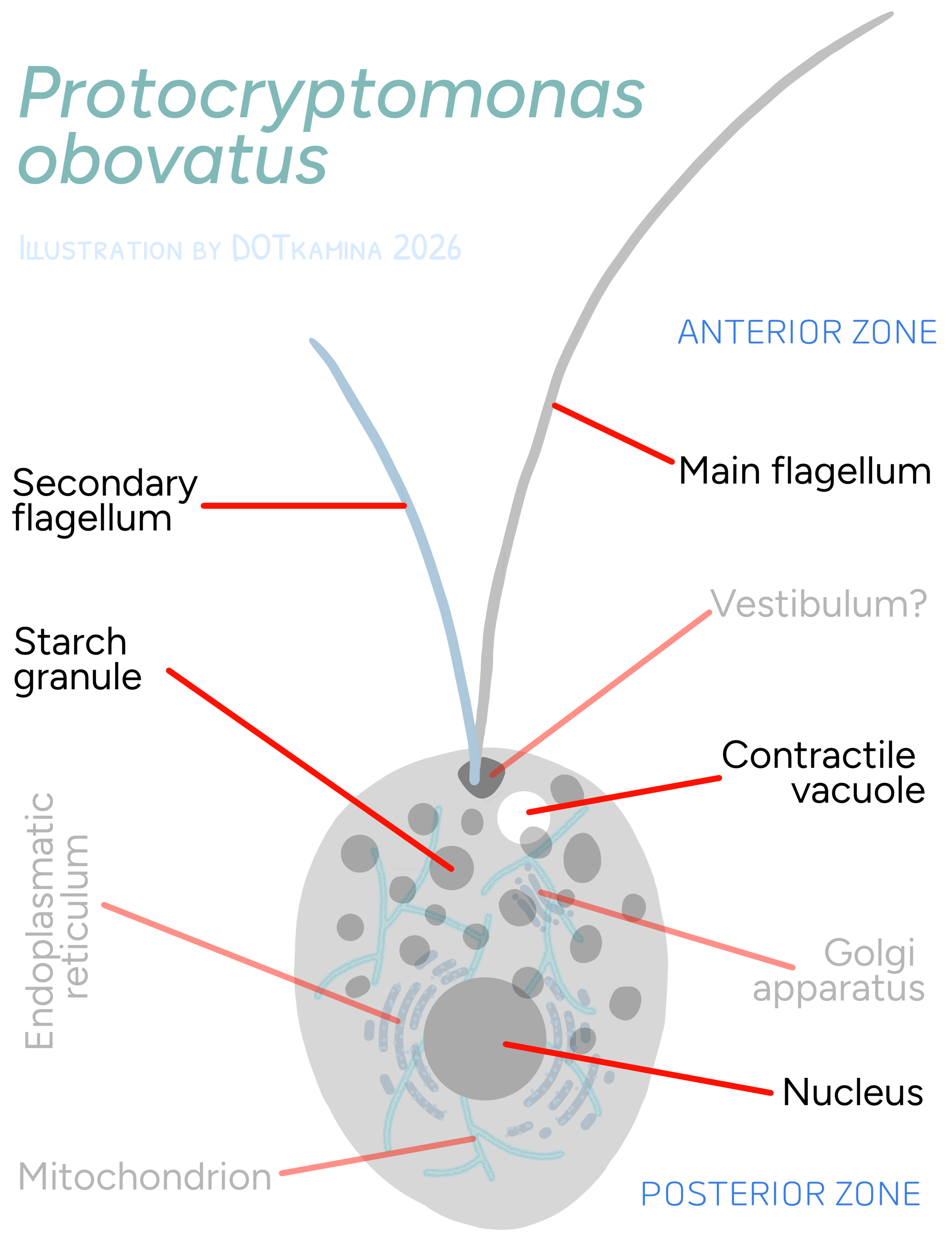
Protocryptomonas obovatus

Later, in a 1968 article, the same author mentioned three new species for the same genus: P. ellipsoidea, P. obovata, and P. chilomonoides. These were also not considered valid for the same reason: a lack of type specimens. In 1989, Bicudo validated the genus Protocryptomonas.

Currently, it is recognized in AlgaeBase with five species: P. acuta, P. chilomonoides, P. ellipsoidea, P. mukdenensis (the type species) and P. sygmoidea.

== Description ==
It is generally described as a genus of dorsiventrally asymmetric, biflagellate cryptomonad algae with a central nucleus and a contractile vacuole near the flagellar bases. They have 5 to 10 starch granules (although P. mukdenensis appears to have only one large granule). They lack chloroplasts, a furrow/gullet system, and ejectisomes.
