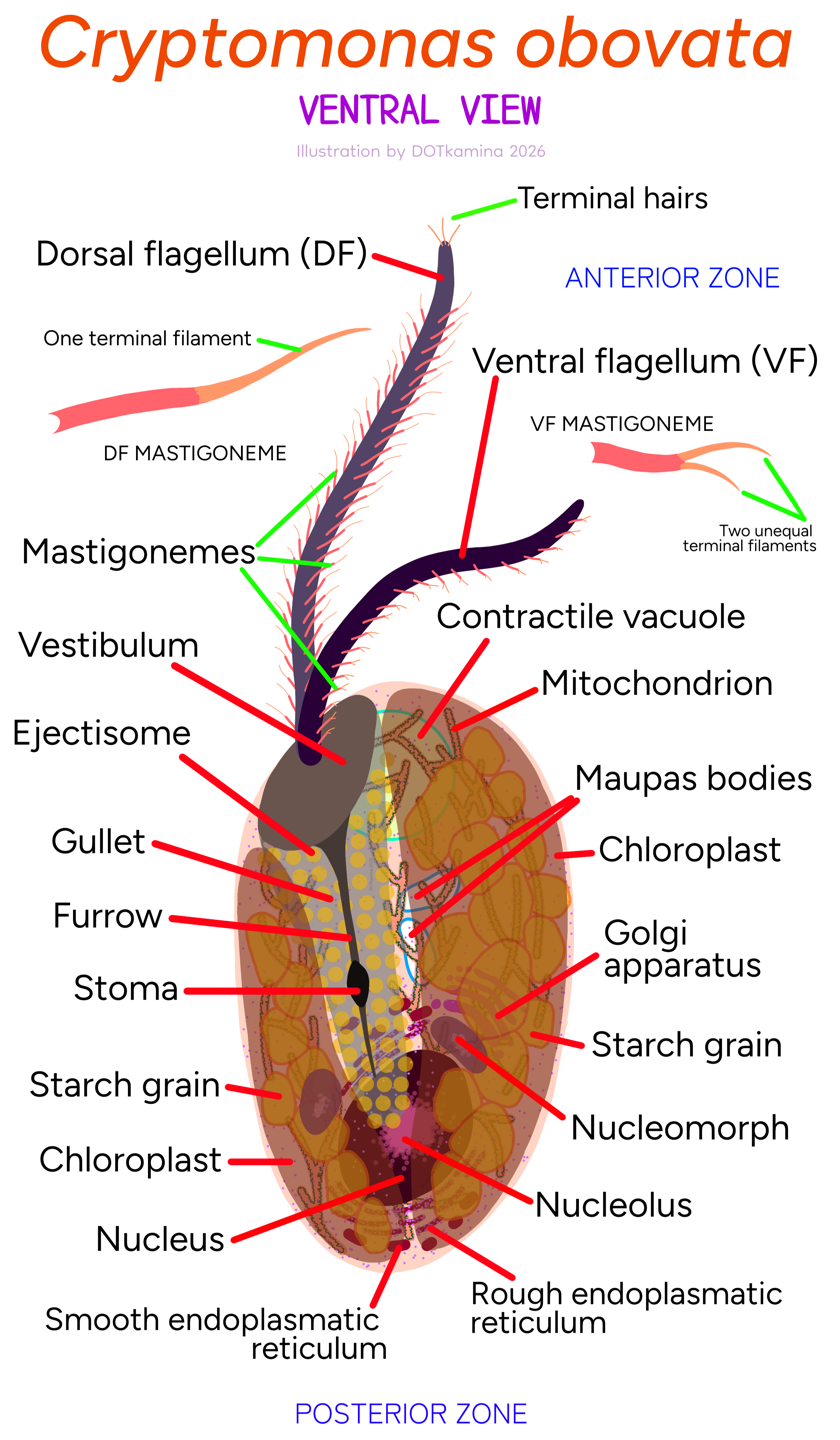

Scientific classification
- Domain: Eukaryota
- Clade: Pancryptista
- Phylum: Cryptista
- Superclass: Cryptomonada
- Class: Cryptophyceae
- Order: Cryptomonadales
- Family: Cryptomonadaceae
- Genus: Cryptomonas
- Species: C. obovata

Binomial name
- Cryptomonas obovata Skuja, 1948

= Cryptomonas obovata =

Species of single-celled organism

Cryptomonas obovata is a cryptomonad, and one of the species included in the genus Cryptomonas. It differs from other species by lacking pyrenoids. Instead, it has a large number of starch granules distributed throughout its cell.

== Description. ==
Like other cryptomonad species, it has two chloroplasts, a cell nucleus, and two nucleomorphs near the nucleus. In C. obovata, only the cryptomorph has been found, one of the two forms that can be found in Cryptomonas (the other being the campylomorph). In the cryptomorph, the vestibulum lacks a ligula, the periplast is composed of two parts (the inner and the surface periplast components), and the furrow has a stoma. There is only one reticulated mitochondrion that branches throughout the cell. The flagella differ in size; the longer one has two rows of mastigonemes, while the shorter one has only one.
