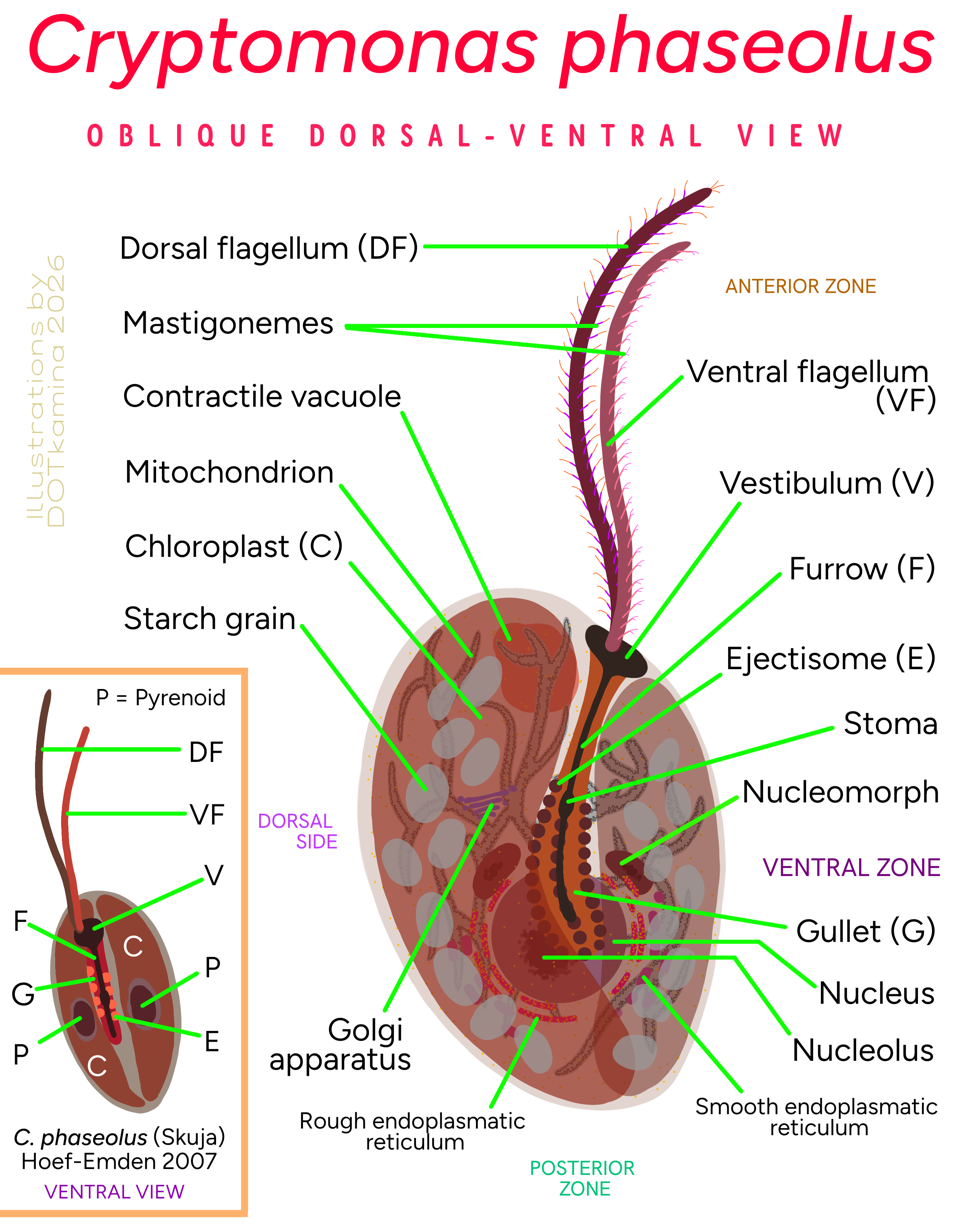

Scientific classification
- Domain: Eukaryota
- Phylum: Cryptista
- Superclass: Cryptomonada
- Class: Cryptophyceae
- Order: Cryptomonadales
- Family: Cryptomonadaceae
- Genus: Cryptomonas
- Species: C. phaseolus

Binomial name
- Cryptomonas phaseolus Skuja, 1948

= Cryptomonas phaseolus =

Species of single-celled organism

Cryptomonas phaseolus is a species of cryptomonad alga with a brown to reddish coloration, which has two chloroplasts without pyrenoids. However, in 2013 a taxon with the same scientific name but different authorship, C. phaseolus (Skuja) Hoef-Emden 2007, was described, which does have pyrenoids.

== Description ==
It is the smallest Cryptomonas species (8–13 µm in length, 5–8 µm in diameter). It has an ellipsoidal shape when viewed laterally. It has two flagella inserted on the right side of the vestibule. The posterior end is slightly narrower than the anterior end.
