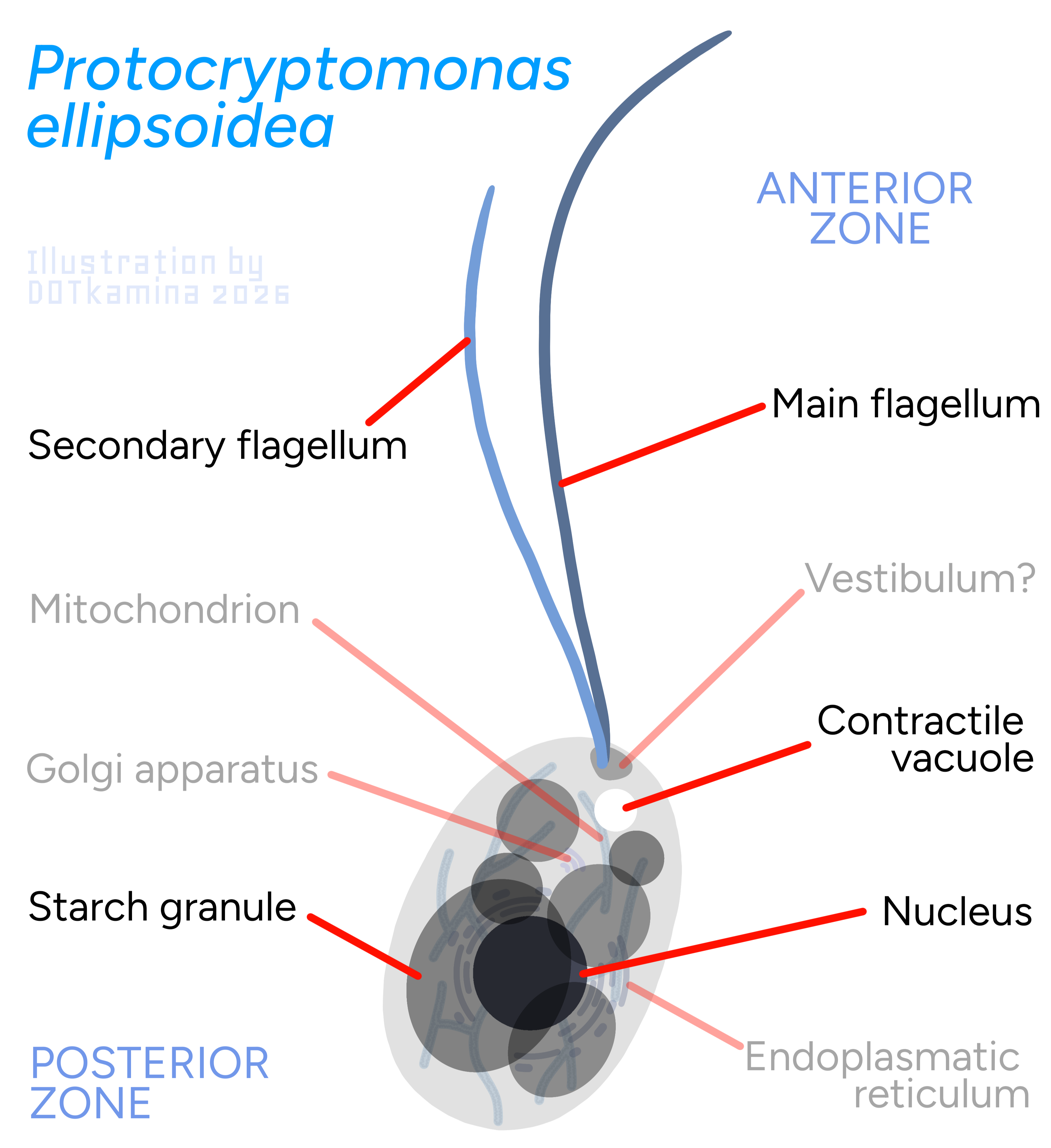

Scientific classification
- Domain: Eukaryota
- Phylum: Cryptista
- Superclass: Cryptomonada
- Class: Cryptophyceae
- Order: Cryptomonadales
- Family: Cryptomonadaceae
- Genus: Protocryptomonas
- Species: P. ellipsoidea

Binomial name
- Protocryptomonas ellipsoidea Skvortsov 1969

= Protocryptomonas ellipsoidea =

Species of single-celled cryptomonad alga

Protocryptomonas ellipsoidea is a species of the genus Protocryptomonas. Described by the botanist Skvortsov in 1968, it is characterized as a nearly elliptical cell with some starch granules of variable size. Its nucleus is centrally located. The contractile vacuole is situated near the flagellar bases. The primary flagellum is twice the length of the cell, and the secondary flagellum is 1.5 times the length of the cell.

P. ellipsoidea cells appear to have rapid, rotary movements. It was found in a cold-water pond near the city of Harbin during the autumn. Its distribution is inferred to be in northern Manchuria, China.
