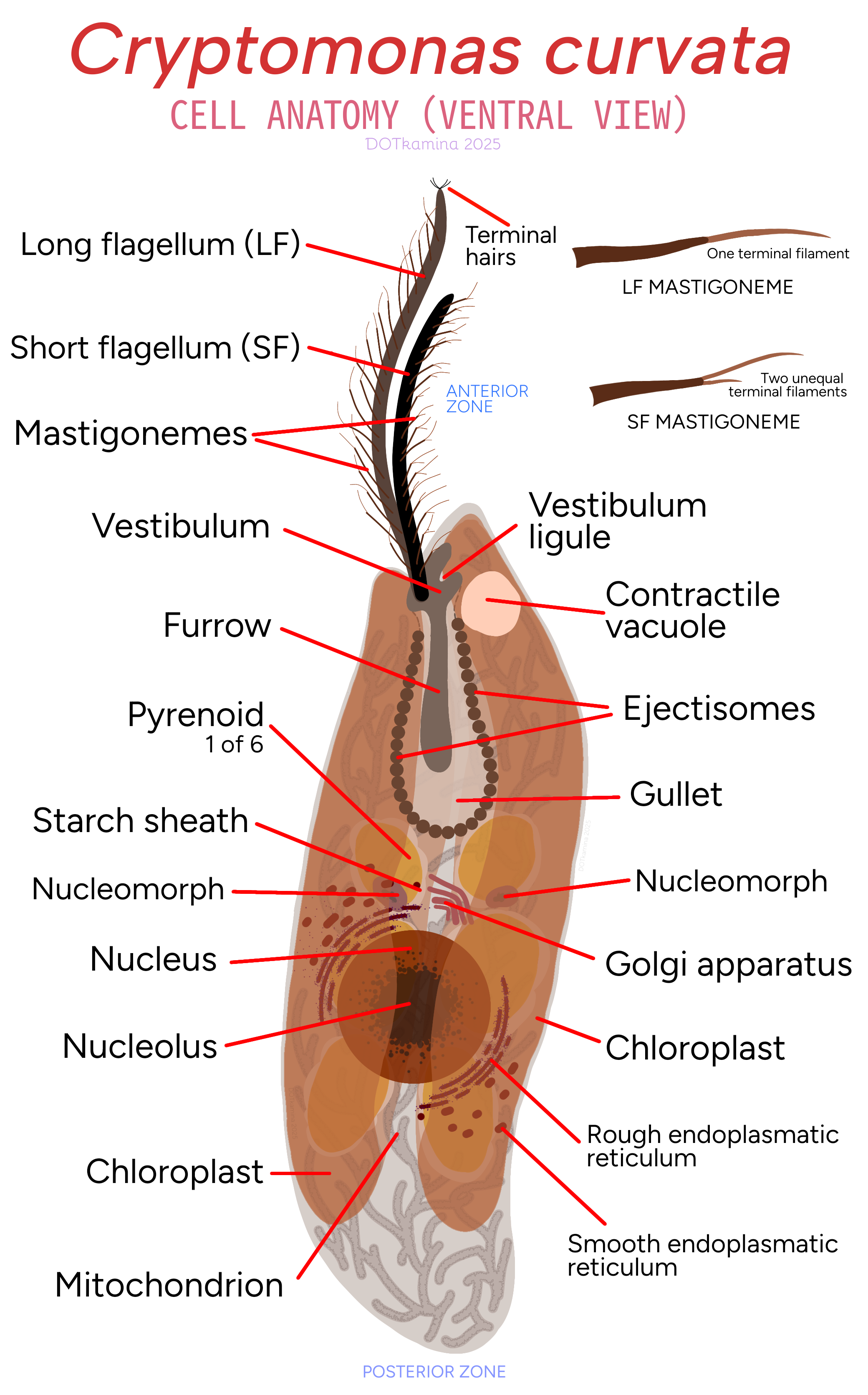
- Cell anatomy of Cryptomonas curvata

Scientific classification
- Domain: Eukaryota
- Clade: Pancryptista
- Phylum: Cryptista
- Superclass: Cryptomonada
- Class: Cryptophyceae
- Order: Cryptomonadales
- Family: Cryptomonadaceae
- Genus: Cryptomonas; Ehrenberg, 1831

Type species
- Cryptomonas ovata Ehrenberg 1831

Species
- See text

Synonyms
- Campylomonas Hill 1991; Cryptochrysis Pascher 1911; Chroomonas (Cryptochrysis) (Pascher 1911) Butcher 1967; Cryptomonas (Caerulomonas) Butcher 1967; Cryptomonas (Eucryptomonas) Diesing 1850; Cryptomonas sect. Eucryptomonas (Diesing 1850) Massart 1901; Pseudocryptomonas Bicudo & Tell 1988

= Cryptomonas =

Genus of single-celled organisms

Cryptomonas is the name-giving genus of the cryptomonads established by German biologist Christian Gottfried Ehrenberg in 1831. The algae are common in freshwater habitats and brackish water worldwide and often form blooms in greater depths of lakes. The cells are usually brownish or greenish in color and are characteristic of having a slit-like furrow at the anterior. They are not known to produce any toxins. They are used to feed small zooplankton, which is the food source for small fish in fish farms. Many species of Cryptomonas can only be identified by DNA sequencing. Cryptomonas can be found in several marine ecosystems in Australia and South Korea.

== Etymology ==
Cryptomonas has the meaning of hidden small flagellates from “crypto” and “monas”.

== Genome structure ==
Species within Cryptomonas contain four genomes: the nuclear, the nucleomorph, the plastid, and mitochondrial genomes. The plastid genome contains 118 kilobase pairs and is a result of one endosymbiosis event of ancient red alga. The study of genome structures of the genus has contributed to the life-history dependent dimorphism of Cryptomonas, which is discussed in details later in the section Dimorphism.

== Functions ==
Cryptomonas are also photolithotrophs that contribute to oxygenic carbon fixation making them greatly critical to the carbon levels of fresh water environments.

== Reproduction ==
Replication of Cryptomonas occurs in early summer when fresh water species are also reproducing. Cryptomonas replicates via mitosis that only takes about ten minutes. Sexual reproduction is not observed in this genus as many other genera of cryptophytes also do not reproduce sexually.

== Cell structure ==
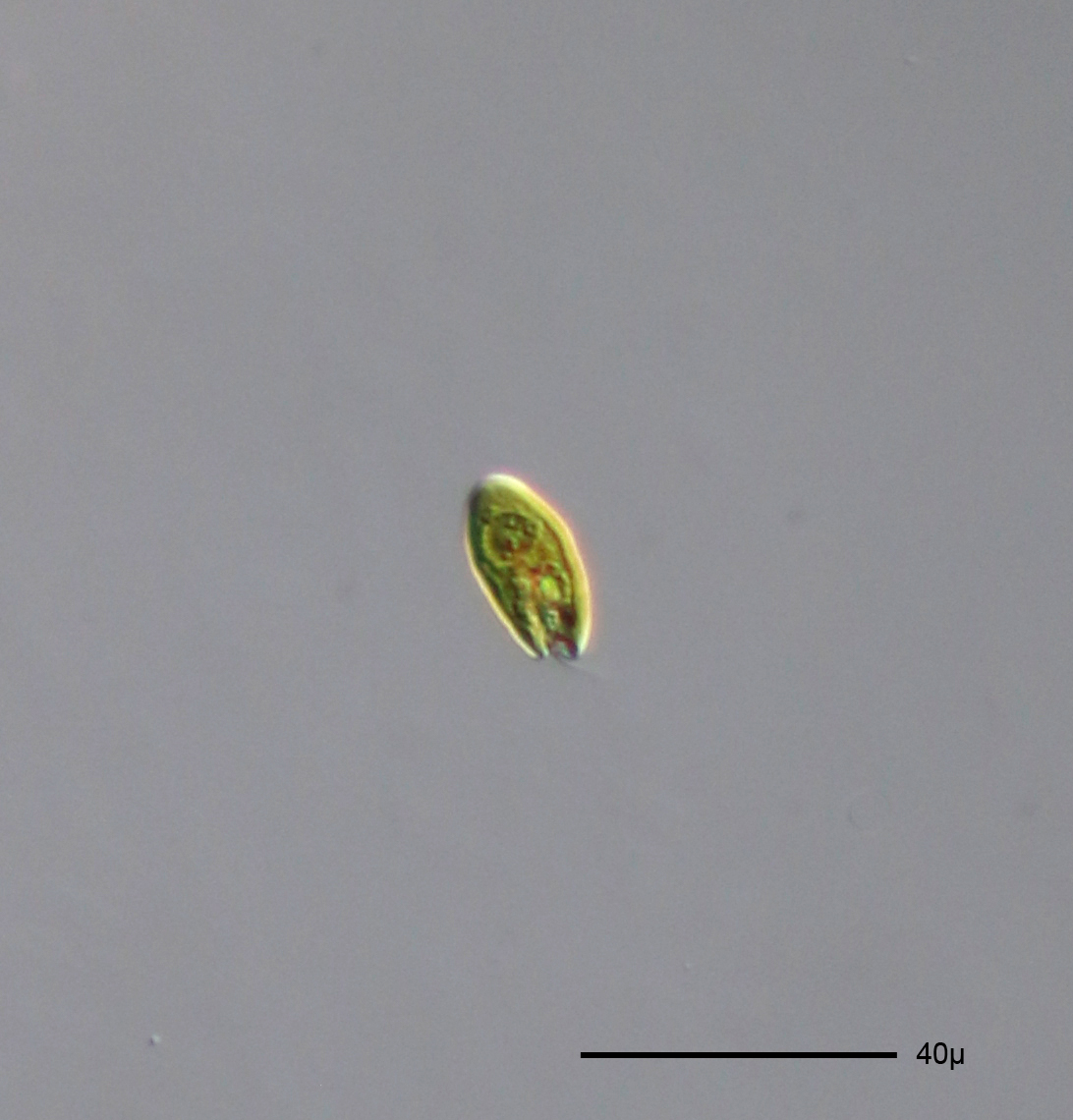
Cryptomonas platyuris

Organisms are asymmetric with a transparent membrane on the outside. The membrane is not ciliated. Cryptomonas cells are fairly large; they average about 40 micrometers in size and often take the shape of an oval or ovoid. There are two flagella present, yet the two flagella are not equally sized. One is shorter and curled and the other one is longer and straight. The two flagella are fixed to the cell by four unique microtubular roots. In addition, the flagella are lined with small hairs that allow for better movement. There are also contractile vacuoles that control the flow of water in and out.

Two boat-shaped plastids are observed in the cells. In a secondary endosymbiosis event, the phagotrophic ancestor of the Cryptomonas presumably captured a red alga and reduced it to a complex plastid with four envelope membranes. The phycobilisomes of the former red algae were reduced until only phycoerythrin remained. Phycoerythrobilin, a type of red phycobilin pigment, is a chromophore discovered in cyanobacteria, chloroplasts of red algae and some cryptomonads. Phycoerythrobilin is present in the phycobiliprotein phycoerythrin, the terminal acceptor of energy during the process of photosynthesis. The phycoerythrin was translocated into the thylakoid lumen with its chromophore composition altered; subsequently, phycobiliproteins with at least seven different absorption spectra evolved. Cryptomonas is distinguished by the purple phycoerythrin 566 as an accessory pigment, which gives the organisms a brownish color in appearance.

== Behaviour ==
Cryptomonas are large in size, grow rather slowly, and are limited in nutrients. It also migrates between depths of water in order to reach depths that are ideal for photosynthesis and bacteriograzing, as well avoiding organisms that are their predators. Typically, they are found at depths of up to 102 meters and in a temperature range of -1.4 to 1.5 degrees Celsius. Cryptomonas seem to grow and survive with little competition. Cryptomonas swim actively, and they rotate while moving and sometimes swim in helical motion.

== Dimorphism ==
Life history-dependent dimorphism was first described in organisms in 1986. In Proteomonas, another genus of Cryptophyceae, the two morphs revealed large differences in cell size which apparently led to its discovery and subsequent recognition. Cryptomonas has been discovered to be another genus that possesses the characteristic of dimorphism.

Traditionally, Cryptomonas was considered to be 3 separate genera: Chilomonas, Cryptomonas and Campylomonas. Before further molecular analysis, Cryptomonas have been characterized by mainly morphological characters, such as cell size, cell shape, number and color of plastids. However, it was still difficult to define Cryptomonas due to insufficient understanding of morphological characters and less-than adequate visibility of living cells using light microscopy alone to observe the cell structures. Also, laboratories had lacked the condition to detect the different stages of particular organisms.

The furrow-gullet system was used as a standard for organization of genera for many years. Most other cryptophyte genera have either furrow or gullet, but Cryptomonas is one of the genera that possess a combination of the two, creating a furrow-gullet complex. The furrow-gullet complex is used by the cells to digest food for smaller organisms. Also, ejectisomes are found to be surrounding the complex. Previously, different textures of furrow plates are used to classify genera. For example, a furrow plate (extending posteriorly along one side of the ventral furrow-gullet complex) has been described as “scalariform” in Campylomonas yet “fibrous” in Cryptomonas. In addition, in Cryptomonas, the inner periplast component consists of polygonal plates. In contrast, in Campylomonas, the inner periplast component is a continuous sheet-like layer.

However, during later research, more evidence of both molecular phylogeny and morphology has been found to support the claim that the three genera should be considered one single dimorphic genus. Characters previously used to distinguish Cryptomonas from Campylomonas were found to occur together in dimorphic strains, such as the type of periplast (polygonal periplast plates versus a continuous periplast sheet), indicating that periplast types relate to different life-history stages of a single taxon. To evaluate the taxonomic significance of the type of periplast and other characters previously used to distinguish genera and species, molecular phylogenetic analyses have been used to study two nuclear ribosomal DNA regions (ITS2, partial LSU rDNA) and a nucleomorph ribosomal gene (SSU rDNA). The results of the phylogenetic study provide molecular evidence for a life history-dependent dimorphism in the genus Cryptomonas: the genus Campylomonas represents the alternate morph of Cryptomonas. Campylomonas and Chilomonas are reduced to synonyms of Cryptomonas.

== Further research ==
In addition to plastids containing phycoerythrobilin, campylomorphs, formerly genera Campylomonas and Chilomonas, also contain a colorless plastid that lacks photosynthetic pigment: leucoplast.

Since the complete loss of photopigments clearly distinguishes the leukoplastidious cryptophytes from Cryptomonas, the incorporation of “Chilomonas” with Cryptomonas has been highly debatable. Scientists have not yet found out an explanation of how leucoplasts disappear during later life stage and when they disappear.

== Species ==
- Cryptomonas ampulla Playfair
- Cryptomonas anomala F.E.Fritsch, 1914
- Cryptomonas appendiculata Schiller, 1957
- Cryptomonas baltica (G.Karsten) Butcher, 1967
- Cryptomonas borealis Skuja, 1956
- Cryptomonas brevis J.Schiller
- Cryptomonas commutata (Pascher) Hoef-Emden, 2007
- Cryptomonas compressa Pascher, 1913
- Cryptomonas croatanica P.H.Campbell, 1973
- Cryptomonas curvata Ehrenberg, 1831
- Cryptomonas cylindracea Skuja, 1956
- Cryptomonas czosnowskii Kisselev
- Cryptomonas erosa Ehrenberg, 1832
- Cryptomonas gemma Playfair
- Cryptomonas gracilis Skuja
- Cryptomonas gyropyrenoidosa Hoef-Emden & Melkonian, 2003
- Cryptomonas marssonii Skuja, 1948
- Cryptomonas maxima Playfair
- Cryptomonas mikrokuamosa R.E.Norris, 1964
- Cryptomonas nasuta Pascher
- Cryptomonas oblonga Playfair
- Cryptomonas obovata Skuja, 1948
- Cryptomonas obovoidea Pascher, 1913
- Cryptomonas ovata Ehrenberg, 1832
- Cryptomonas paramaecium (Ehrenberg) Hoef-Emden & Melkonian, 2003
- Cryptomonas parapyrenoidifera Skuja
- Cryptomonas pelagica H.Lohmann
- Cryptomonas phaseolus Skuja, 1948
- Cryptomonas platyuris Skuja, 1948
- Cryptomonas profunda R.W.Butcher, 1967
- Cryptomonas prora W.Conrad & H.Kufferath
- Cryptomonas pyrenoidifera Geitler, 1922
- Cryptomonas rhynchophora (W.Conrad) Butcher
- Cryptomonas richei F.E.Fritsch, 1914
- Cryptomonas rostrata Skuja, 1948
- Cryptomonas splendida J.Czosnowski
- Cryptomonas tenuis Pascher
- Cryptomonas testacea P.H.Campbell, 1973
- Cryptomonas tetrapyrenoidosa Skuja, 1948
