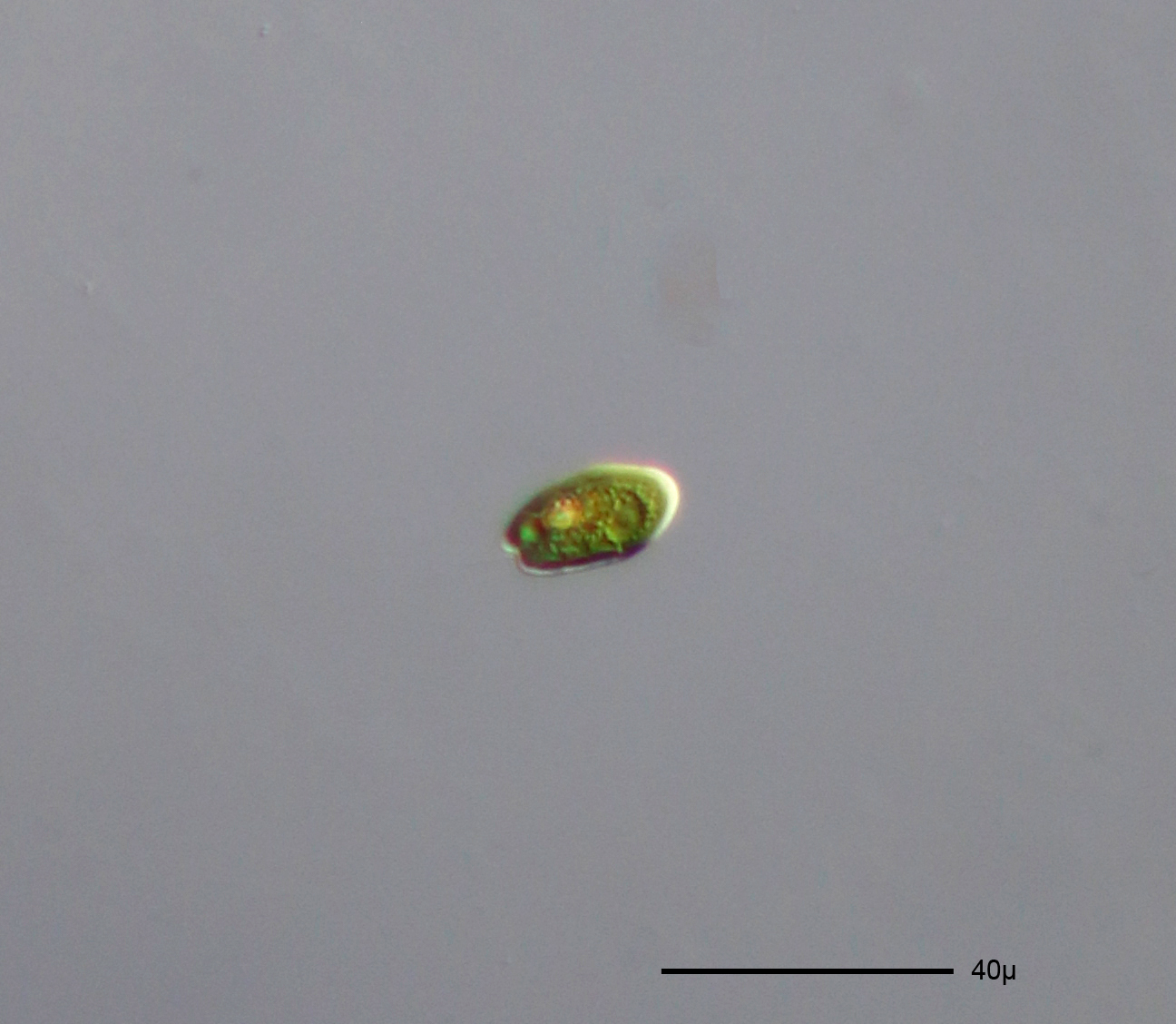
- Cryptomonas platyuris

Scientific classification
- Domain: Eukaryota
- Clade: Pancryptista
- Phylum: Cryptista
- Superclass: Cryptomonada
- Class: Cryptophyceae
- Order: Cryptomonadales
- Family: Cryptomonadaceae; Ehrenberg, 1831

Type genus
- Cryptomonas Ehrenberg, 1831

Genera
- Chilomonas; Cryptochloris; Cryptomonas; Cyanomastix; Isoselmis; Kisselevia; Meyeriella; Naisa; Olivamonas; Protocryptomonas

Synonyms
- Cryptomonadidae Clakins 1901; Cryptomonadinae Reichenow 1928; Cryptomonadoideae Huber-Pestalozzi 1950 ex Melchior 1954; Cryptomonadeae Pascher 1913; Campylomonadaceae Clay, Kugrens & Lee 1999; Chilomonadidae Kent 1881; Chilomonadaceae Lemmermann 1903; Chilomonadoideae Melchior 2019; Eucryptomonadidae Reichenow 1928; Eucryptomonadinae Pascher 1913

= Cryptomonadaceae =

Family of single-celled organisms

Cryptomonadaceae is a family of Cryptophyceae in the order Cryptomonadales. The unicellular algae of this family have a furrow-gullet complex. They typically have chloroplasts that are reddish or greenish in color, with nucleomorphs located between the nucleus and the pyrenoid (if present). There may be more than one pyrenoid. The life cycle of these organisms is complex, as they can have cryptomorph and campylomorph phases. Both states have morphological differences.

Thus, the cryptomorph has a complex furrow with a stoma, a more oval or rounded cell shape, and an internal periplast component (IPC) made of multiple plates. In the campylomorph, the furrow is simple without a stoma, the vestibulum has a vestibular ligule, the cell shape is more sigmoid, and the IPC is composed of a single lamella.

Cryptomorphs possess a fibrous furrow plate and a short rhizostyle without wings (lamellae). Campylomorphs possess a scalariform plate and a long, keeled rhizostyle with wings (lamellae).

Not all species have found both cryptomorph-campylomorph states; in some, only one of these states has been found, and the other is unknown or still under investigation, since there are described species that were later reassigned as synonyms of others, when it was seen that they were actually one of these morphological states.
