= Amarin Corporation =

Pharmaceutical company

- Company type: Public
- Traded as: Nasdaq: AMRN
- Industry: Biotechnology
- Founded: 1993; 33 years ago
- Headquarters: Dublin, Ireland; Bridgewater, New Jersey, US
- Key people: Aaron Berg (CEO)
- Products: Vascepa (AMR-101)
- Revenue: ▲$614.1 Million (2020)
- Number of employees: ~1000
- Website: amarincorp.com

Amarin Corporation is an Irish-American biopharmaceutical company founded in 1993 and headquartered in Dublin, Ireland and Bridgewater, New Jersey. The company develops and markets medicines for the treatment of cardiovascular disease. It has developed the drug Vascepa (AMR-101), a prescription grade omega-3 fatty acid.

In July 2012, their lead-candidate drug named Vascepa (AMR-101) received FDA-approval, competing against GlaxoSmithKline's Lovaza.

== History ==
Amarin Corporation plc (formerly Ethical Holdings plc) was originally incorporated in England as a private limited company on March 1, 1989, and later re-registered as a public company on March 19, 1993. In 2002, the company suffered losses worth $37 million; 2003 losses exceeded $19 million. As of 2005, it was developing neurology drugs. It developed Miraxion to treat serious hereditary neurodegenerative disease.

In December 2007, Amarin acquired Ester Neurosciences Limited for US$8.1 million. In 2011, CEO Joe Zakrzewski said that the company would like to first work on building its infrastructure out to commercialize the drug in the United States.

== Products and development ==
=== Vascepa (USA) / Vazkepa (EU) ===
Amarin´s sole product VASCEPA® came on the market in 2013 for triglyceride levels >=500 milligrams per deciliter. In December 2019, the FDA approved "...the use of Vascepa (icosapent ethyl) as an adjunctive (secondary) therapy to reduce the risk of cardiovascular events among adults with elevated triglyceride levels (a type of fat in the blood) of 150 milligrams per deciliter or higher. Patients must also have either established cardiovascular disease or diabetes and two or more additional risk factors for cardiovascular disease....Vascepa is the first FDA approved drug to reduce cardiovascular risk among patients with elevated triglyceride levels as an add-on to maximally tolerated statin therapy.

Furthermore, VASCEPA® is in use in clinical trials by 3rd parties to see, if it has an effect on Alzheimer, Colon Cancer, Nonalcoholic Steatohepatitis (NASH), and other diseases.

HLS Therapeutics, Amarin´s license partner in Canada, presented results of their COVID-19 clinical trial for Vascepa at National Lipid Association Scientific Sessions 2020, December 12. The results demonstrated a 25% reduction of hs-CRP, a biomarker for inflammation. Most people with COVID-19 die, because of a cytokine storm, which causes an uncontrolled and excessive release of pro-inflammatory signaling molecules called cytokines. Two more COVID-19 studies are actually running with Vascepa to validate and proof further benefits.

On January 28, the Committee for Medicinal Products for Human Use gave a positive recommendation for Vazcepa (its name in the EU), which the European Commission finally approved on March 30.

=== Patent disputes ===
On March 30, 2020, the designated patent judge in the U.S. District Court for the District of Nevada, Miranda Du, ruled for generic-drug makers Hikma Pharmaceuticals and Dr. Reddy's Laboratories in a lawsuit with Amarin over patents on Amarin's drug, Vascepa. Soon after, on April 2, 2020, Amarin filed an appeal of the ruling. The appeal was lost and an en-banc was also not granted, afterwards. On November 30, three weeks after Hikma Pharmaceuticals started the distribution of their generic version of Vascepa, Amarin filed a complaint of patent infringement against Hikma. On February 11, 2021, Amarin filed a petition for certiorari with the US Supreme Court. On June 21, 2021, the petition was denied.

== Finance ==
| Year | Revenue in mil. US$ |
|---|---|
| 2014 | 26,30 |
| 2015 | 54,20 |
| 2016 | 81,08 |
| 2017 | 128,97 |
| 2018 | 228,60 |
| 2019 | 429,80 |
| 2020 | 614,10 |

== See also ==
- Biotech and pharmaceutical companies in the New York metropolitan area
