= Omega-3-acid ethyl esters =

Pharmaceutical product

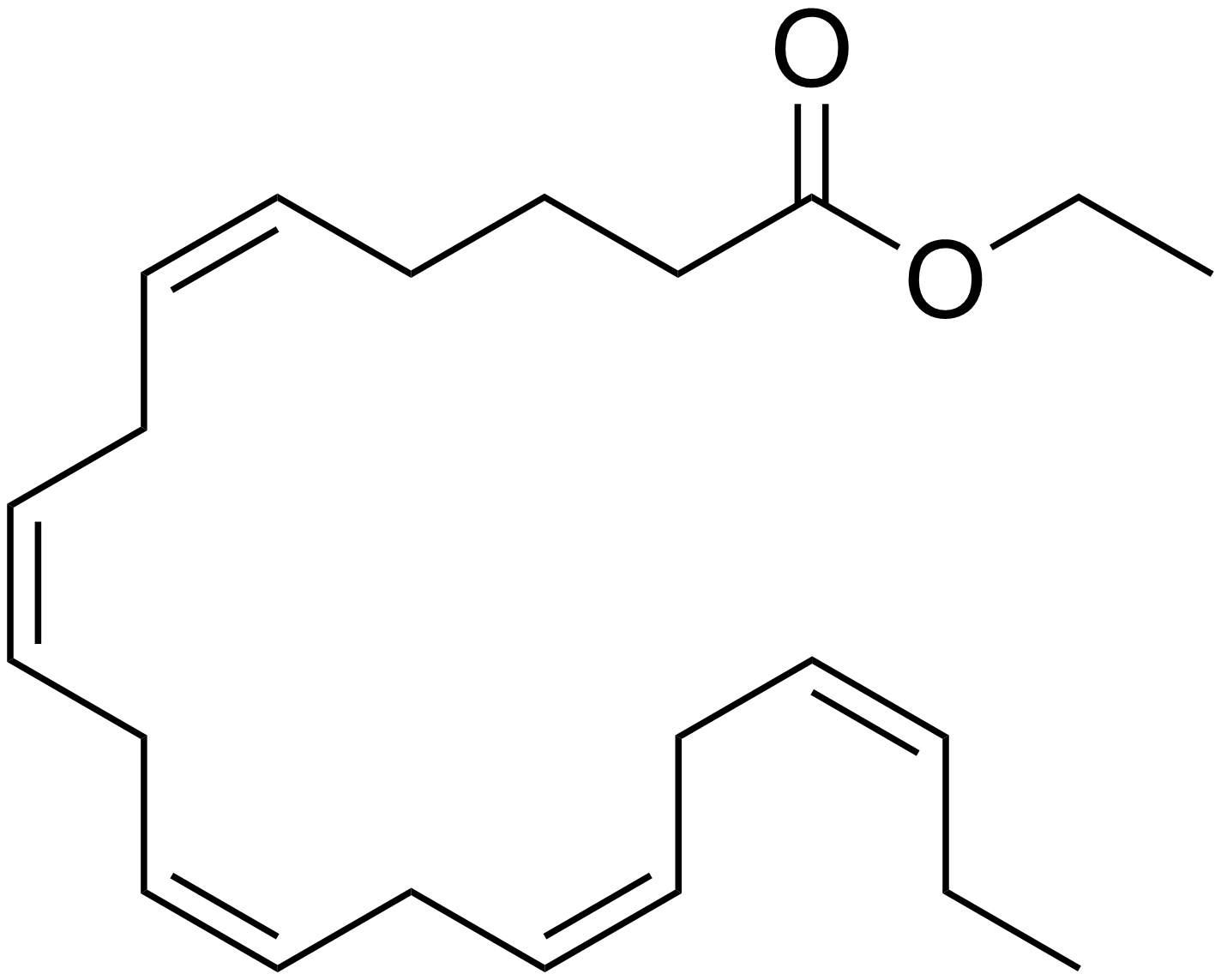
- Chemical structure of ethyl eicosapentaenoate, an important omega-3-acid ethyl ester

Combination of
- Ethyl eicosapentaenoate: Antilipemic agent
- Ethyl docosahexaenoate: Antilipemic agent

Clinical data
- Trade names: Lovaza, Omacor, others
- Other names: Ethyl polyenoate (ChP)
- AHFS/Drugs.com: Monograph
- License data: US DailyMed: Omega-3-acid ethyl esters
- Pregnancy category: AU: B1
- Routes of administration: By mouth
- ATC code: None

Legal status
- Legal status: UK: POM (Prescription only); US: ℞-only; In general: ℞ (Prescription only)

Identifiers
- CAS Number: 308081-97-2
- PubChem SID: 347910460
- DrugBank: DB09539
- UNII: D87YGH4Z0Q
- KEGG: D05255
- ChEMBL: ChEMBL1200711

Omega-3-acid ethyl esters are a mixture of ethyl eicosapentaenoate and ethyl docosahexaenoate, which are ethyl esters of the omega−3 fatty acids eicosapentaenoic acid (EPA) and docosahexaenoic acid (DHA) found in fish oil. Together with dietary changes, they are used to treat high blood triglycerides which may reduce the risk of pancreatitis. They are generally less preferred than statins, and use is not recommended by NHS Scotland as the evidence does not support a decreased risk of heart disease. Omega-3-acid ethyl esters are taken by mouth.

Common side effects include burping, nausea, and an upset abdomen. Serious side effects may include liver problems and anaphylaxis. While use in pregnancy has not been well studied, some omega−3 fatty acids appear beneficial. How it works is not entirely clear.

Experts found a dose-dependent increase in the risk for atrial fibrillation in patients with cardiovascular diseases or cardiovascular risk factors who were being treated with omega-3-acid ethyl esters compared with those treated with placebo. The observed risk was at its highest at a dose of 4 g/d.

Omega-3-acid ethyl ester medicines were approved for medical use in the European Union in 2000 and in the United States in 2004. Beyond the branded prescription formulation, it is also available as a generic medication and over the counter. In 2023, it was the 222nd most commonly prescribed medication in the United States, with more than 1 million prescriptions.

== Medical use ==
Omega-3-acid ethyl esters are used in addition to changes in diet to reduce triglyceride levels in adults with severe (≥ 500 mg/dL) hypertriglyceridemia. In the European Union and other major markets outside the US, omega-3-acid ethyl esters are indicated for hypertriglyceridemia by itself, or in combination with a statin for people with mixed dyslipidemia.

Intake of large doses (2.0 to 4.0 g/day) of long-chain omega−3 fatty acids as prescription drugs or dietary supplements are generally required to achieve significant (> 15%) lowering of triglycerides, and at those doses, the effects can be significant (from 20% to 35% and even up to 45% in individuals with levels greater than 500 mg/dL). It appears that both eicosapentaenoic acid (EPA) and docosahexaenoic acid (DHA) lower triglycerides, but DHA appears to raise LDL cholesterol more than EPA, while DHA raises HDL cholesterol while EPA does not.

=== Other fish oil-based drugs ===
Other omega−3 fish oil-based prescription drugs on the market have similar uses and mechanisms of action.

- Ethyl eicosapentaenoic acid (Vascepa). EPA-only ethyl esters.
- Omega-3-carboxylic acids (Epanova). This product contains free fatty acids, not ethyl esters. It is currently withdrawn from the market by the manufacturer (AstraZeneca) and is thus unavailable to patients. AstraZeneca voluntarily discontinued Phase III clinical trials for futility.

=== Dietary supplements ===
There are many fish oil dietary supplements on the market. There appears to be little difference in effect between dietary supplement and prescription forms of omega−3 fatty acids as to ability to lower triglycerides, but the ethyl ester products work less well when taken on an empty stomach or with a low-fat meal. The ingredients of dietary supplements are not as carefully controlled as prescription products and have not been tested in clinical trials as such drugs have. Prescription omega−3 products are more concentrated, requiring fewer softgels for the same daily dose. Dietary fish oil is often esterified and then molecularly distilled to attain higher purity and/or concentration. Typical 'concentrated' fish oil supplements have doubled contents of EPA/DHA (ca. 50-65%). There are also products on the market with even higher concentrations of EPA/DHA (ca. 65-85%), labelled with 'triple', 'ultra', or similar wording. Some producers also provide backward conversion of FAE to triglyceride form in assumption of its higher bioavailability, these products usually have 'rTG' in their names.

In people with CKD who require hemodialysis, there is a risk that vascular blockage due to clotting, may prevent dialysis therapy from being possible. Omega−3 fatty acids contribute to the production of eicosanoid molecules that reduce clotting. However, a Cochrane review in 2018 did not find clear evidence that omega−3 supplementation has any impact on the prevention of vascular blockage in people with CKD. There was also moderate certainty that supplementation did not prevent hospitalization or death within a 12-month period.

== Side effects ==
Special caution should be taken with people who have fish and shellfish allergies. In addition, as with other omega−3 fatty acids, taking omega-3-acid ethyl esters puts people who are on anticoagulants at risk for prolonged bleeding time.

Side effects include stomach ache, burping, and a bad taste; some people on very high doses (8g/day) in clinical trials had atrial fibrillation.

Omega-3-acid ethyl esters have not been tested in pregnant women and are rated pregnancy category C; it is excreted in breast milk and the effects on infants are not known.

== Pharmacokinetics ==
After ingestion, omega-3-acid ethyl esters are metabolized mostly in the liver like other dietary fatty acids.

Ethyl esters and triglycerides of omega−3 fatty acids show similar rates of absorption while monoglycerides and free fatty acids are absorbed significantly better. Absorption rates depend on the mode of consumption and fat content of the following/accompanying meal. This may explain discrepancies in results of different studies.

== Mechanism of action ==
Omega-3-acid ethyl esters, like other omega−3 fatty acid-based drugs, appears to reduce production of triglycerides in the liver and to enhance clearance of triglycerides from circulating very low-density lipoprotein (VLDL) particles. The way it does that is not clear, but potential mechanisms include increased breakdown of fatty acids; inhibition of diglyceride acyltransferase, which is involved in biosynthesis of triglycerides in the liver; and increased activity of lipoprotein lipase in blood. The synthesis of triglycerides is reduced in the liver because EPA and DHA are poor substrates for the enzymes responsible for triglyceride synthesis.

== Physical and chemical properties ==
The active ingredient is concentrated omega-3-acid ethyl esters that are made from fish body oils that are purified and esterified. For the Lovaza product, each 1000 mg softgel capsule contains 840 mg omega−3 fatty acids: eicosapentaenoic acid ethyl ester (460 mg) and docosahexaenoic acid ethyl ester (380 mg).

== History ==
Pronova BioPharma ASA had its roots in Norway's codfish liver oil industry. The company was founded in 1991 as a spinout from the JC Martens company, which was founded in 1838 in Bergen, Norway. Pronova developed the concentrated omega-3-acid ethyl esters formulation that is the active pharmaceutical ingredient of Lovaza.

Pronova won approvals to market the drug, called Omacor in Europe (and initially in the US), in several European countries in 2001 after conducting a three-and-a-half-year trial in 11,000 subjects; The company partnered with other companies like Pierre Fabre in France. In 2004, Pronova licensed the US and Puerto Rican rights to Reliant Therapeutics, whose business model was in-licensing of cardiovascular drugs. In that same year, Reliant and Pronova won FDA approval for the drug, and it was launched in the US and Europe in 2005. Global sales in 2005 were $144M, and by 2008, they were $778M. In 2007 GlaxoSmithKline acquired Reliant for $1.65 billion in cash.

In 2009, generic companies Teva Pharmaceuticals and Par Pharmaceutical made clear their intentions to file Abbreviated New Drug Applications ("ANDAs") to bring generics to market, and in April 2009, Pronova sued them from infringing the key US patents covering Lovaza, US 5,656,667 (due to expire in April 2017), US 5,502,077 (exp March 2013). Subsequently, in May 2012, a district court ruled in Pronova's favor, saying that the patents were valid. The generic companies appealed, and in September 2013, the Federal Circuit reversed, saying that because more than one year before Pronova's predecessor company applied for a patent, it had sent samples of the fish oil used in Lovaza to a researcher for testing. This event thus constituted "public use" that invalidated the patent in question. Generic versions of Lovaza were introduced in America in April 2014.

Pronova has continued to manufacture the ingredients in Lovaza, and in 2012, BASF announced it would acquire Pronova for $844 million. The deal closed in 2013.

== Society and culture ==
=== Brand names ===
- Lovaza (US)/Omacor (Europe). It was approved in the United States in 2004.
- Omtryg is another brand of omega-3-acid ethyl esters developed by Trygg Pharma, Inc. and was approved by the FDA in 2014.
