= Seaweed oil =

Type of oil used for food

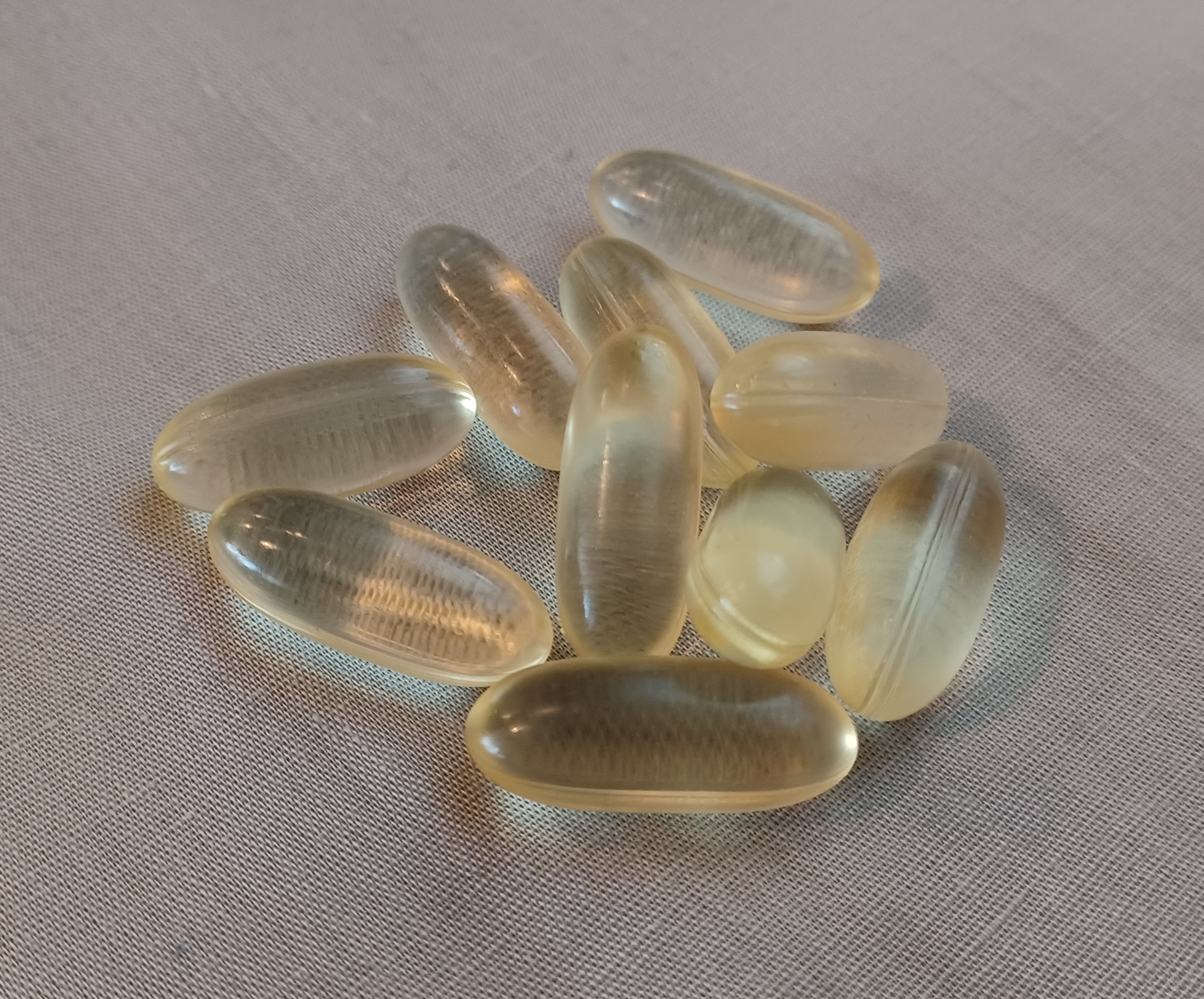
Omega-3 supplement capsules that are 96.3% algae oil.

Seaweed oil, also called algae oil or algal oil, is used for making food, with the purified product almost colorless and odorless. It is also under development as a possible alternative fuel and manufacturing agent.

Seaweed oil is also used as a source of fatty acid dietary supplement, as it contains mono- and polyunsaturated fats, in particular EPA and DHA, both of them omega-3 fatty acids. The supplement's DHA content is roughly equivalent to that of salmon-based fish oil supplement.

Seaweed oil is also used for biofuel, pharmaceutical manufacturing, massage oil, soaps, and lotions.

== See also ==
- List of omega-3 fatty acids
- Edible seaweed
