= Omega−3 fatty acid =

Class of polyunsaturated fatty acids

Omega−3 fatty acids, also called omega−3 oils, ω−3 fatty acids or n−3 fatty acids, are polyunsaturated fatty acids (PUFAs) characterized by the presence of a double bond three atoms away from the terminal methyl group (numbered ω, the last letter of the Greek alphabet) in their chemical structure. They are widely distributed in nature, are important constituents of animal lipid metabolism, and play an important role in the human diet and in human physiology. The three types of omega−3 fatty acids involved in human physiology are α-linolenic acid (ALA), eicosapentaenoic acid (EPA) and docosahexaenoic acid (DHA). ALA is found in some land plants, while DHA and EPA are found in algae and fish. Marine algae and phytoplankton are primary sources of omega−3 fatty acids. DHA and EPA accumulate in fish that eat these algae. Common sources of land plants containing ALA include walnuts, chia seeds, and flaxseeds as well as hempseed oil, while sources of EPA and DHA include fish and fish oils, and algae oil.

Almost without exception, animals are unable to synthesize the essential omega−3 fatty acid ALA and can only obtain it through diet. However, they can use ALA, when available, to form EPA and DHA, by creating additional double bonds along its carbon chain (desaturation) and extending it (elongation). ALA (18 carbons and 3 double bonds) is used to make EPA (20 carbons and 5 double bonds), which is then used to make DHA (22 carbons and 6 double bonds). The ability to make the longer-chain omega−3 fatty acids from ALA may be impaired in aging. In foods exposed to air, unsaturated fatty acids are vulnerable to oxidation and rancidity.

Omega−3 fatty acid supplementation has limited evidence of benefit in preventing cancer, all-cause mortality and most cardiovascular outcomes, although it modestly lowers blood pressure and reduces triglycerides. Since 2002, the United States Food and Drug Administration (FDA) has approved four fish oil-based prescription drugs for the management of hypertriglyceridemia, namely Lovaza, Omtryg (both omega-3-acid ethyl esters), Vascepa (ethyl eicosapentaenoic acid) and Epanova (omega-3-carboxylic acids).

== History ==
In 1929, George and Mildred Burr discovered that fatty acids were critical to health. If fatty acids were absent from the diet, a life-threatening deficiency syndrome ensued. The Burrs coined the phrase "essential fatty acids". Since then, researchers have shown a growing interest in unsaturated essential fatty acids as they form the framework for the organism's cell membranes. Subsequently, awareness of the health benefits of essential fatty acids has dramatically increased since the 1980s.

On 8 September 2004, the U.S. Food and Drug Administration gave "qualified health claim" status to EPA and DHA omega−3 fatty acids, stating, "supportive but not conclusive research shows that consumption of EPA and DHA [omega−3] fatty acids may reduce the risk of coronary heart disease". This updated and modified their health risk advice letter of 2001 (see below).

The Canadian Food Inspection Agency has recognized the importance of DHA omega−3 and permits the following claim for DHA: "DHA, an omega−3 fatty acid, supports the normal physical development of the brain, eyes and nerves primarily in children under two years of age."

Historically, whole food diets contained sufficient amounts of omega−3, but because omega−3 is readily oxidized, the trend toward shelf-stable processed foods has led to a deficiency in omega−3 in manufactured foods.

== Nomenclature ==
Chemical structure of α-linolenic acid (ALA), a fatty acid with a chain of 18 carbons with three double bonds on carbons numbered 9, 12, and 15. The omega (ω) end of the chain is at carbon 18, and the double bond closest to the omega carbon begins at carbon 15 = 18−3. Hence, ALA is a ω−3 fatty acid with ω = 18.

The terms ω−3 ("omega−3") fatty acid and n−3 fatty acid are derived from the nomenclature of organic chemistry. One way in which an unsaturated fatty acid is named is determined by the location, in its carbon chain, of the double bond which is closest to the methyl end of the molecule. In general terminology, n (or ω) represents the locant of the methyl end of the molecule, while the number n−x (or ω−x) refers to the locant of its nearest double bond. Thus, in omega−3 fatty acids in particular, there is a double bond located at the carbon numbered 3, starting from the methyl end of the fatty acid chain. This classification scheme is useful since most chemical changes occur at the carboxyl end of the molecule, while the methyl group and its nearest double bond are unchanged in most chemical or enzymatic reactions.

In the expressions n−x or ω−x, the symbol is a minus sign rather than a hyphen (or dash), although it is never read as such. Also, the symbol n (or ω) represents the locant of the methyl end, counted from the carboxyl end of the fatty acid carbon chain. For instance, in an omega−3 fatty acid with 18 carbon atoms (see illustration), where the methyl end is at location 18 from the carboxyl end, n (or ω) represents the number 18, and the notation n−3 (or ω−3) represents the subtraction 18−3 = 15, where 15 is the locant of the double bond which is closest to the methyl end, counted from the carboxyl end of the chain.

Although n and ω (omega) are synonymous, the IUPAC recommends that n be used to identify the highest carbon number of a fatty acid. Nevertheless, the more common name – omega−3 fatty acid – is used in both the lay media and scientific literature.

=== Example ===
For example, α-linolenic acid (ALA; illustration) is an 18-carbon chain having three double bonds, the first located at the third carbon from the methyl end of the fatty acid chain. Hence, it is an omega−3 fatty acid. Counting from the other end of the chain, that is the carboxyl end, the three double bonds are located at carbons 9, 12, and 15. These three locants are typically indicated as Δ9c, Δ12c, Δ15c, or cisΔ^{9}, cisΔ^{12}, cisΔ^{15}, or cis-cis-cis-Δ^{9,12,15}, where c or cis means that the double bonds have a cis configuration.

α-Linolenic acid is polyunsaturated (containing more than one double bond) and is also described by a lipid number, 18:3, meaning that there are 18 carbon atoms and 3 double bonds.

== Chemistry ==
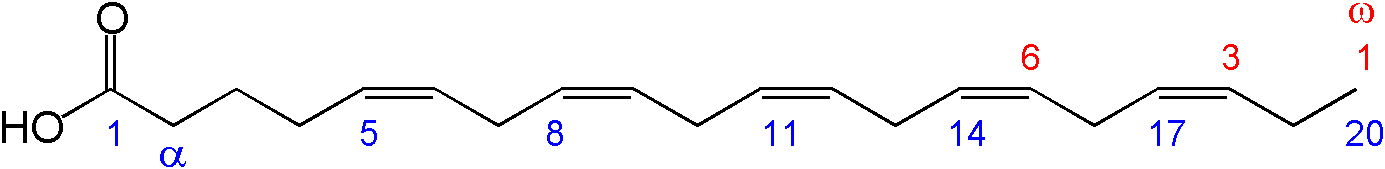
Chemical structure of eicosapentaenoic acid (EPA)

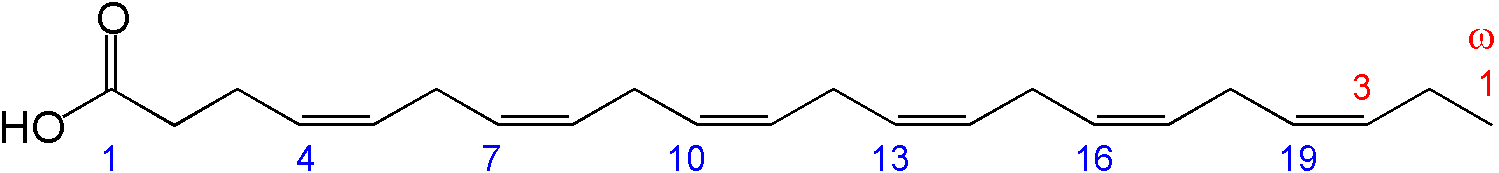
Chemical structure of docosahexaenoic acid (DHA)

An omega−3 fatty acid is a fatty acid with multiple double bonds, where the first double bond is between the third and fourth carbon atoms from the end of the carbon atom chain. "Short-chain" omega−3 fatty acids have a chain of 18 carbon atoms or less, while "long-chain" omega−3 fatty acids have a chain of 20 or more.

Three omega−3 fatty acids are important in human physiology, α-linolenic acid (18:3, n−3; ALA), eicosapentaenoic acid (20:5, n−3; EPA), and docosahexaenoic acid (22:6, n−3; DHA). These three polyunsaturates have either 3, 5, or 6 double bonds in a carbon chain of 18, 20, or 22 carbon atoms, respectively. As with most naturally-produced fatty acids, all double bonds are in the cis-configuration, in other words, the two hydrogen atoms are on the same side of the double bond; and the double bonds are interrupted by methylene bridges (−CH_{2}−), so that there are two single bonds between each pair of adjacent double bonds.

The atoms at bis-allylic (between double bonds) sites are prone to oxidation by free radicals. Replacement of hydrogen atoms with deuterium atoms in this location protects the omega−3 fatty acid from lipid peroxidation and ferroptosis.

=== List of omega−3 fatty acids ===
This table lists several different names for the most common omega−3 fatty acids found in nature.

Common name	Lipid number	Chemical name
Hexadecatrienoic acid (HTA)	16:3 (n−3)	all-cis-7,10,13-hexadecatrienoic acid
α-Linolenic acid (ALA)	18:3 (n−3)	all-cis-9,12,15-octadecatrienoic acid
Stearidonic acid (SDA)	18:4 (n−3)	all-cis-6,9,12,15-octadecatetraenoic acid
Eicosatrienoic acid (ETE)	20:3 (n−3)	all-cis-11,14,17-eicosatrienoic acid
Eicosatetraenoic acid (ETA)	20:4 (n−3)	all-cis-8,11,14,17-eicosatetraenoic acid
Eicosapentaenoic acid (EPA)	20:5 (n−3)	all-cis-5,8,11,14,17-eicosapentaenoic acid
Heneicosapentaenoic acid (HPA)	21:5 (n−3)	all-cis-6,9,12,15,18-heneicosapentaenoic acid
Docosapentaenoic acid (DPA), Clupanodonic acid	22:5 (n−3)	all-cis-7,10,13,16,19-docosapentaenoic acid
Docosahexaenoic acid (DHA)	22:6 (n−3)	all-cis-4,7,10,13,16,19-docosahexaenoic acid
Tetracosapentaenoic acid	24:5 (n−3)	all-cis-9,12,15,18,21-tetracosapentaenoic acid
Tetracosahexaenoic acid (Nisinic acid)	24:6 (n−3)	all-cis-6,9,12,15,18,21-tetracosahexaenoic acid

== Forms ==
Omega−3 fatty acids occur naturally in two forms, triglycerides and phospholipids. In the triglycerides, they, together with other fatty acids, are bonded to glycerol; three fatty acids are attached to glycerol. Phospholipid omega−3 is composed of two fatty acids attached to a phosphate group via glycerol.

The triglycerides can be converted to the free fatty acid or to methyl or ethyl esters, and the individual esters of omega−3 fatty acids are available.

== Mechanism of action ==
The 'essential' fatty acids were given their name when researchers found that they are essential to normal growth in young children and animals. The omega−3 fatty acid DHA, also known as docosahexaenoic acid, is found in high abundance in the human brain. It is produced by a desaturation process, but humans lack the desaturase enzyme, which acts to insert double bonds at the ω_{6} and ω_{3} position. Therefore, the ω_{6} and ω_{3} polyunsaturated fatty acids cannot be synthesized, are appropriately called essential fatty acids, and must be obtained from the diet.

In 1964, it was discovered that enzymes found in sheep tissues convert omega−6 arachidonic acid into the inflammatory agent, prostaglandin E_{2}, which is involved in the immune response of traumatized and infected tissues. By 1979, eicosanoids were further identified, including thromboxanes, prostacyclins, and leukotrienes. The eicosanoids typically have a short period of activity in the body, starting with synthesis from fatty acids and ending with metabolism by enzymes. If the rate of synthesis exceeds the rate of metabolism, the excess eicosanoids may have deleterious effects. Researchers found that certain omega−3 fatty acids are also converted into eicosanoids and docosanoids, but at a slower rate. If both omega−3 and omega−6 fatty acids are present, they will "compete" to be transformed, so the ratio of long-chain omega−3:omega−6 fatty acids directly affects the type of eicosanoids that are produced.

=== Interconversion ===
==== Conversion efficiency of ALA to EPA and DHA ====
Humans can convert short-chain omega−3 fatty acids to long-chain forms (EPA, DHA) with an efficiency below 5%. The omega−3 conversion efficiency is greater in women than in men, but less studied. Higher ALA and DHA values found in plasma phospholipids of women may be due to the higher activity of desaturases, especially that of delta-6-desaturase.

These conversions occur competitively with omega−6 fatty acids, which are essential closely related chemical analogues that are derived from linoleic acid. They both utilize the same desaturase and elongase proteins in order to synthesize inflammatory regulatory proteins. The products of both pathways are vital for growth, making a balanced diet of omega−3 and omega−6 important to an individual's health. A balanced intake ratio of 1:1 was believed to be ideal in order for proteins to be able to synthesize both pathways sufficiently, but this has been controversial as of recent research.

The conversion of ALA to EPA and further to DHA in humans has been reported to be limited, but varies with individuals. Women have higher ALA-to-DHA conversion efficiency than men, which is presumed to be due to the lower rate of use of dietary ALA for beta-oxidation. One preliminary study showed that EPA can be increased by lowering the amount of dietary linoleic acid, and DHA can be increased by elevating intake of dietary ALA.

==== Omega−6 to omega−3 ratio ====
The human diet has changed over centuries to an increased intake of omega−6 fats over omega−3 fats. While omega−3 polyunsaturated fatty acids may reduce the risk of heart disease in humans, the level of omega−6 polyunsaturated fatty acid intake (and, therefore, the ratio) may not affect disease risk.

Both omega−6 and omega−3 fatty acids are essential, meaning humans must consume them in their diet. Omega−6 and omega−3 eighteen-carbon polyunsaturated fatty acids compete for the same metabolic enzymes, thus the omega−6:omega−3 ratio of ingested fatty acids has significant influence on the ratio and rate of production of eicosanoids, a group of hormones intimately involved in the inflammatory and homeostatic processes of the body, which include the prostaglandins, leukotrienes, and thromboxanes, among others. Altering this ratio can change the body's metabolic and inflammatory state.

Metabolites of omega−6 are more inflammatory (esp. arachidonic acid) than those of omega−3. However, a meta-analysis found that replacing saturated fat with omega−6 fats reduced the risk of coronary events by 24%.

A healthy ratio of omega−6 to omega−3 is needed; healthy ratios, according to some authors, range from 1:1 to 1:4. Other authors believe that a ratio of 4:1 (4 times as much omega−6 as omega−3) is already healthy.

Typical Western diets provide ratios of between 10:1 and 30:1 (i.e., dramatically higher levels of omega−6 than omega−3).

The ratios of omega−6 to omega−3 fatty acids in some common vegetable oils are: canola 2:1, hemp 2–3:1, soybean 7:1, olive 3–13:1, sunflower (no omega−3), flax 1:3, cottonseed (almost no omega−3), peanut (no omega−3), grapeseed oil (almost no omega−3), and corn oil 46:1.

== Biochemistry ==
=== Transporters ===
DHA in the form of lysophosphatidylcholine is transported into the brain by a membrane transport protein, MFSD2A, which is exclusively expressed in the endothelium of the blood–brain barrier.

== Dietary sources ==
Grams of omega−3 per 3oz (85g) serving
Common name	grams omega−3
Flax	19.5
Herring, sardines	1.3–2
Mackerel: Spanish/Atlantic/Pacific	1.1–1.7
Salmon	1.1–1.9
Halibut	0.60–1.12
Tuna	0.21–1.1
Swordfish	0.97
Greenshell/lipped mussels	0.95
Tilefish	0.9
Tuna (canned, light)	0.17–0.24
Pollock	0.45
Cod	0.15–0.24
Catfish	0.22–0.3
Flounder	0.48
Grouper	0.23
Mahi mahi	0.13
Red snapper	0.29
Shark	0.83
King mackerel	0.36
Hoki (blue grenadier)	0.41
Gemfish	0.40
Blue eye cod	0.31
Sydney rock oysters	0.30
Tuna, canned	0.23
Snapper	0.22
Eggs, large regular	0.109
Strawberry or kiwifruit	0.10–0.20
Broccoli	0.10–0.20
Barramundi, saltwater	0.100
Giant tiger prawn	0.100
Lean red meat	0.031
Turkey	0.030
Milk, regular	0.00

=== Dietary recommendations ===
In the United States, the Institute of Medicine publishes a system of Dietary Reference Intakes, which includes Recommended Dietary Allowances (RDAs) for individual nutrients, and Acceptable Macronutrient Distribution Ranges (AMDRs) for certain groups of nutrients, such as fats. When there is insufficient evidence to determine an RDA, the institute may publish an Adequate Intake (AI) instead, which has a similar meaning, but is less certain. The AI for α-linolenic acid is 1.6 grams/day for men and 1.1 grams/day for women, while the AMDR is 0.6% to 1.2% of total energy. Because the physiological potency of EPA and DHA is much greater than that of ALA, it is not possible to estimate one AMDR for all omega−3 fatty acids. Approximately 10 percent of the AMDR may be consumed as EPA and/or DHA. The Institute of Medicine has not established a RDA or AI for EPA, DHA or the combination, so there is no Daily Value (DVs are derived from RDAs), no labeling of foods or supplements as providing a DV percentage of these fatty acids per serving, and no labeling a food or supplement as an excellent source, or "High in..." As for safety, there was insufficient evidence as of 2005 to set an upper tolerable limit for omega−3 fatty acids, although the FDA has advised that adults may safely consume up to a total of 3 grams per day of combined DHA and EPA, with no more than 2 g from dietary supplements.

The European Commission sponsored a working group to develop recommendations on dietary fat intake in pregnancy and lactation. In 2008, the working group published consensus recommendations, including the following:

- "pregnant and lactating women should aim to achieve an average dietary intake of at least 200 mg DHA/day"
- "women of childbearing age should aim to consume one to two portions of sea fish per week, including oily fish"
- "intake of the DHA precursor, α-linolenic acid, is far less effective with regard to DHA deposition in fetal brain than preformed DHA"

In the EU, the EFSA publishes the Dietary Reference Values (DRVs), that recommends Adequate Intake values for EPA+DHA and DHA:

Dietary Reference Values (DRVs) for EPA+DHA and DHA
Age group (years)	EPA+DHA (mg/day) (Note: AI, Adequate Intake)	DHA (mg/day)
7–11 months (Note: i.e. the second half of the first year of life (from the beginning of the 7th month to the 1st birthday))		100
1		100
2-3	250	
4-6	250	
7-10	250	
11-14	250	
15-17	250	
≥18	250	
Pregnancy	250	+ 100—200 (Note: in addition to combined intakes of EPA and DHA of 250 mg/day)
Lactation	250	+ 100—200

The American Heart Association (AHA) has made recommendations for EPA and DHA due to their cardiovascular benefits: individuals with no history of coronary heart disease or myocardial infarction should consume oily fish two times per week; and "Treatment is reasonable" for those having been diagnosed with coronary heart disease. For the latter the AHA does not recommend a specific amount of EPA + DHA, although it notes that most trials were at or close to 1000 mg/day. The benefit appears to be on the order of a 9% decrease in relative risk. The European Food Safety Authority (EFSA) approved a claim "EPA and DHA contributes to the normal function of the heart" for products that contain at least 250 mg EPA + DHA. The report did not address the issue of people with pre-existing heart disease. The World Health Organization recommends regular fish consumption (1-2 servings per week, equivalent to 200 to 500 mg/day EPA + DHA) as protective against coronary heart disease and ischaemic stroke.

=== Fish ===
The most widely available dietary source of EPA and DHA is oily fish, such as (ranked by grams per serving): salmon, herring, sardines, mackerel, anchovies, and trout. Although fish are a dietary source of omega−3 fatty acids, fish do not synthesize omega−3 fatty acids, but rather obtain them via their food supply, including algae or plankton.

In order for farmed marine fish to have amounts of EPA and DHA comparable to those of wild-caught fish, their feed must be supplemented with EPA and DHA, most commonly in the form of fish oil. For this reason, 81% of the global fish oil supply in 2009 was consumed by aquaculture.

==== Fish oil ====
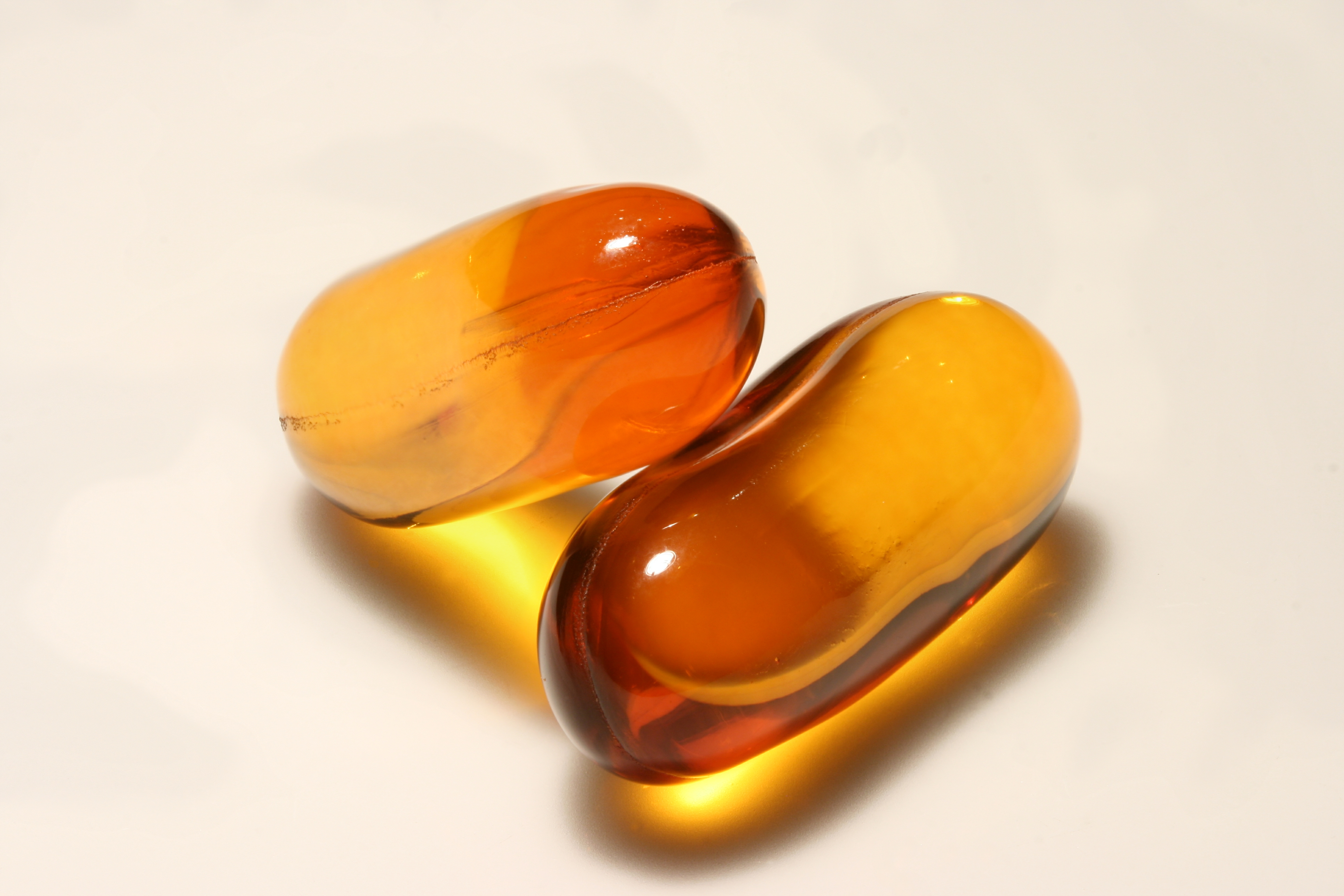
Fish oil capsules

Marine and freshwater fish oil vary in content of arachidonic acid, EPA and DHA. They also differ in their effects on organ lipids.

Not all forms of fish oil supplements may be equally digestible. Of four studies that compare bioavailability of the glyceryl ester form of fish oil vs. the ethyl ester form, two have concluded the natural glyceryl ester form is better, and the other two studies did not find a significant difference. No studies have shown the ethyl ester form to be superior, although it is cheaper to manufacture.

=== Krill ===
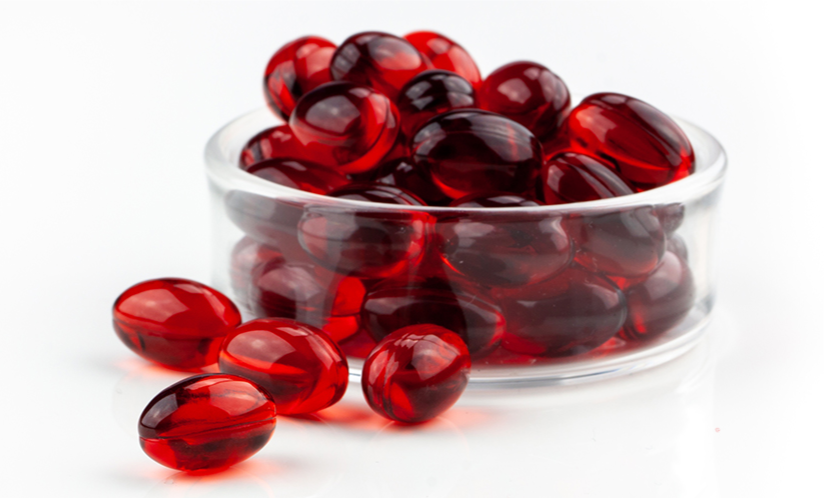
Krill oil capsules

Krill oil is a source of omega−3 fatty acids, specifically in the form of phospholipids. The effect of krill oil, at a lower dose of EPA + DHA (62.8%), was demonstrated to be similar to that of fish oil on blood lipid levels and markers of inflammation in healthy humans. Preliminary studies indicate that the DHA and EPA omega−3 fatty acids found in krill oil are more bio-available than in fish oil. Additionally, krill oil contains astaxanthin, a marine-source keto-carotenoid antioxidant that may act synergistically with EPA and DHA.

=== Plant sources ===
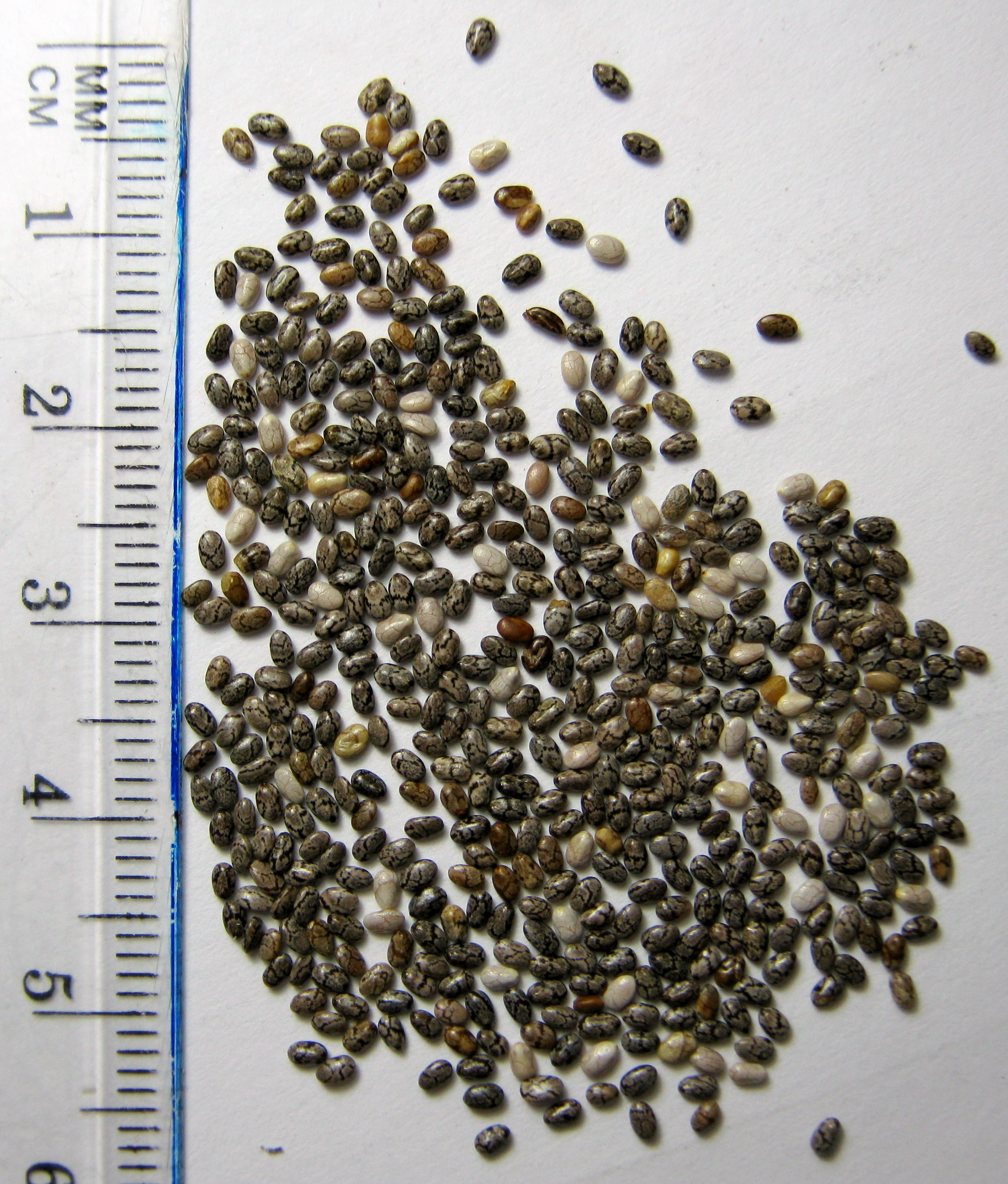
Chia is grown commercially for its seeds rich in ALA

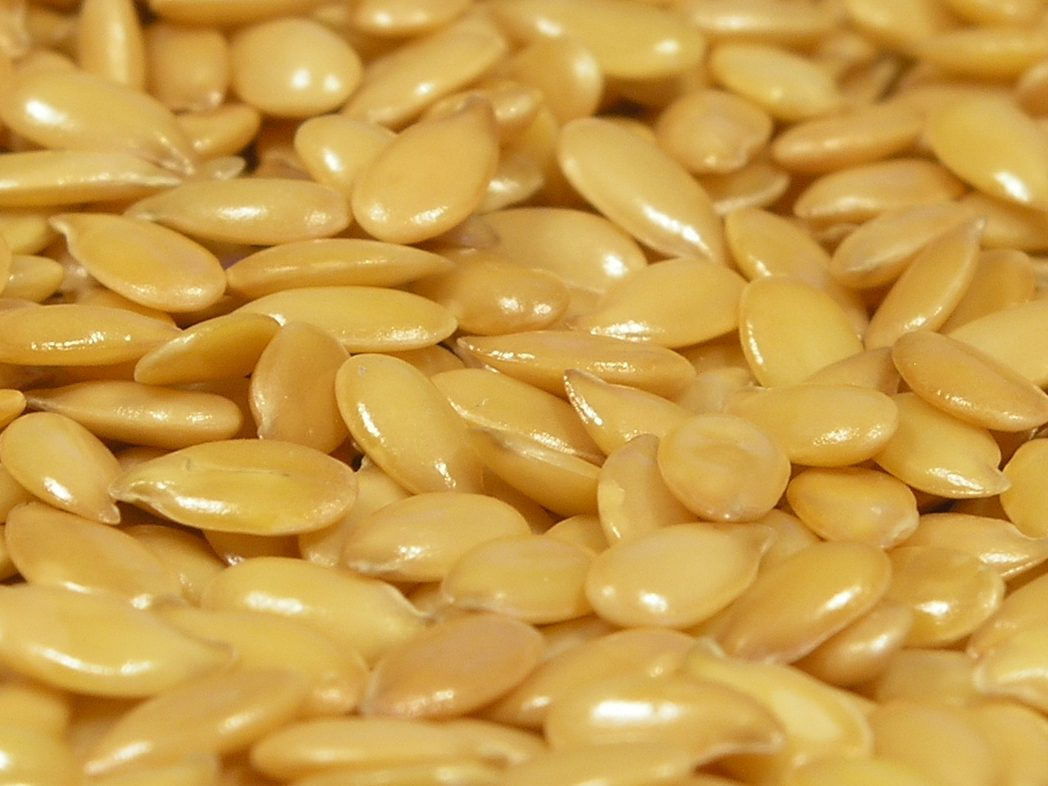
Flax seeds contain linseed oil that has high ALA content

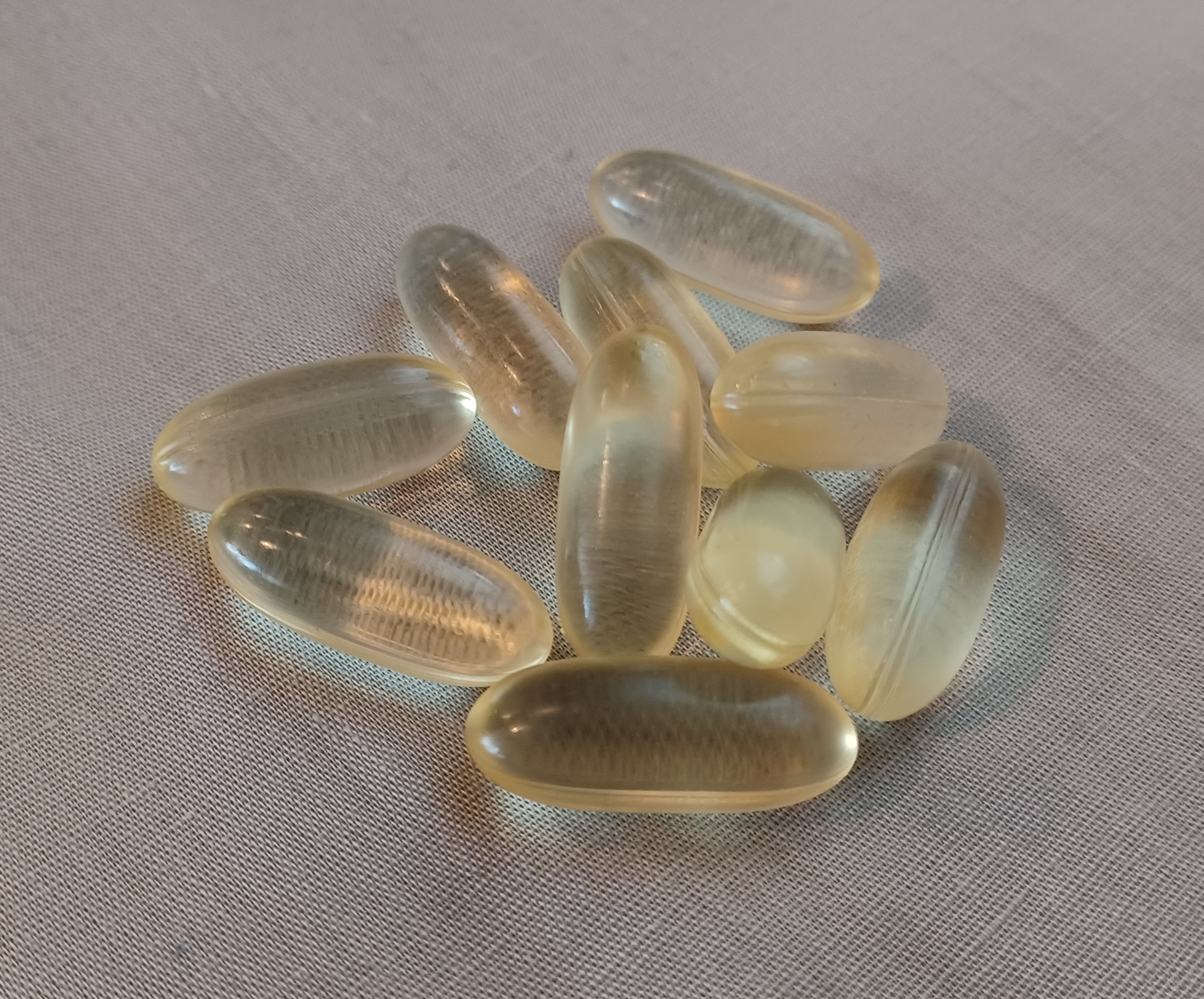
Capsules of omega−3 oil derived from marine algae (Schizochytrium sp.), 96.3% of total content

Table 1. ALA content as the percentage of the seed oil.
Common name	Alternative name	Linnaean name	% ALA
kiwifruit seeds	Chinese gooseberry	Actinidia chinensis var. deliciosa	62.9
perilla	shiso	Perilla frutescens	61
chia seed	chia sage	Salvia hispanica	58
linseed	flax	Linum usitatissimum	53 – 59
lingonberry	cowberry	Vaccinium vitis-idaea	49
fig	common fig	Ficus carica	47.7
camelina	gold-of-pleasure	Camelina sativa	36
purslane	portulaca	Portulaca oleracea	35
black raspberry		Rubus occidentalis	33
hempseed		Cannabis sativa	19
canola	rapeseed	mostly Brassica napus	9 – 11

Table 2. ALA content as the percentage of the whole food.
Common name	Linnaean name	% ALA
linseed	Linum usitatissimum	18.1
hempseed	Cannabis sativa	8.7
butternut	Juglans cinerea	8.7
Persian walnut	Juglans regia	6.3
pecan	Carya illinoinensis	0.6
hazelnut	Corylus avellana	0.1

Linseed (or flaxseed) (Linum usitatissimum) and its oil are perhaps the most widely available botanical source of the omega−3 fatty acid ALA. Flaxseed oil consists of approximately 55% ALA, which makes it six times richer than most fish oils in omega−3 fatty acids. A portion of this is converted by the body to EPA and DHA, although the effective converted percentage may differ between men and women.

The longer-chain EPA and DHA are only naturally made by marine algae and phytoplankton. The microalgae Crypthecodinium cohnii and Schizochytrium are rich sources of DHA, but not EPA, and can be produced commercially in bioreactors for use as food additives. Oil from brown algae (kelp) is a source of EPA. The alga Nannochloropsis also has high levels of EPA.

Some transgenic initiatives have transferred the ability to make EPA and DHA into existing high-yielding crop species of land plants:

- Camelina sativa: In 2013, Rothamsted Research reported two genetically modified forms of this plant. Oil from the seeds of this plant contained on average 15% ALA, 11% EPA, and 8% DHA in one development and 11% ALA and 24% EPA in another.
- Canola: In 2011, CSIRO, GRDC, and Nufarm developed a version of canola that produces DHA in seeds; the oil contains 10% DHA and almost no EPA. In 2018, it was approved as an animal feed additive in Australia. In 2021, the U.S. FDA acknowledged it as a New Dietary Ingredient for humans. Separately, Cargill has commercialized a different strain of canola that produces EPA and DHA for fish feed. The oil contains 8.1% EPA and 0.8% DHA.

=== Eggs ===
Eggs produced by hens fed a diet of greens and insects contain higher levels of omega−3 fatty acids than those produced by chickens fed corn or soybeans. In addition to feeding chickens insects and greens, fish oils may be added to their diets to increase the omega−3 fatty acid concentrations in eggs.

The addition of flax and canola seeds, both good sources of alpha-linolenic acid, to the diets of laying chickens, increases the omega−3 content of the eggs, predominantly DHA. However, this enrichment could lead to an increment of lipid oxidation in the eggs if the seeds are used in higher doses, without using an appropriate antioxidant.

The addition of green algae or seaweed to the diets boosts the content of DHA and EPA, which are the forms of omega−3 approved by the FDA for medical claims. A common consumer complaint is "Omega−3 eggs can sometimes have a fishy taste if the hens are fed marine oils".

=== Meat ===
Omega−3 fatty acids are formed in the chloroplasts of green leaves and algae. While seaweeds and algae are the sources of omega−3 fatty acids present in fish, grass is the source of omega−3 fatty acids present in grass-fed animals. When cattle are taken off omega−3 fatty acid-rich grass and shipped to a feedlot to be fattened on omega−3 fatty acid deficient grain, they begin losing their store of this beneficial fat. Each day that an animal spends in the feedlot, the amount of omega−3 fatty acids in its meat is diminished.

The omega−6:omega−3 ratio of grass-fed beef is about 2:1, making it a more useful source of omega−3 than grain-fed beef, which usually has a ratio of 4:1.

In a 2009 joint study by the USDA and researchers at Clemson University in South Carolina, grass-fed beef was compared with grain-finished beef. The researchers found that grass-finished beef is higher in moisture content, 42.5% lower total lipid content, 54% lower in total fatty acids, 54% higher in beta-carotene, 288% higher in vitamin E (alpha-tocopherol), higher in the B-vitamins thiamin and riboflavin, higher in the minerals calcium, magnesium, and potassium, 193% higher in total omega−3s, 117% higher in CLA (cis-9, trans-11 octadecenoic acid, a conjugated linoleic acid, which is a potential cancer fighter), 90% higher in vaccenic acid (which can be transformed into CLA), lower in the saturated fats, and has a healthier ratio of omega−6 to omega−3 fatty acids (1.65 vs 4.84). Protein and cholesterol content were equal.

The omega−3 content of chicken meat may be enhanced by increasing the animals' dietary intake of grains high in omega−3, such as flax, chia, and canola.

Kangaroo meat is also a source of omega−3, with fillet and steak containing 74 mg per 100 g of raw meat.

=== Seal oil ===
Seal oil is a source of EPA, DPA, and DHA, and is commonly used in Arctic regions. According to Health Canada, it helps to support the development of the brain, eyes, and nerves in children up to 12 years of age. Like all seal products, it is not allowed to be imported into the European Union.

A Canadian company, FeelGood Natural Health, pleaded guilty in 2023 to illegally selling seal oil capsules to American consumers. The company sold over 900 bottles of the capsules, worth over $10,000. Seal oil is made from the blubber of dead seals, and is illegal to sell in the United States under the Marine Mammal Protection Act. The global population of harp seals stands at around 7 million, and they have been hunted in Canada for thousands of years. FeelGood was sentenced to pay a fine of $20,000 and three years of probation.

=== Other sources ===
DuPont has modified Yarrowia lipolytica (a yeast) to produce EPA. The resulting oil is used in a human dietary supplement and in salmon feed.

A trend in the early 21st century was to fortify food with omega−3 fatty acids extracted from any of the sources mentioned above.

== Issues with sources ==
=== Supply shortage ===
Most European countries do not have a large enough seafood supply to meet the European recommendations for fish and DHA intake. If fishing is scaled up to try to meet these demands, it would not be sustainable.

The average daily DHA+EPA intake is lower than the FAO recommendation of 250 mg/day in 142 out of 187 countries surveyed, as of 2010. A 2024 study measured the amount of DHA and EPA in red blood cell membranes to estimate long-chain n-3 nutrition status around the globe, building on top of a 2016 study using the same technique. In both studies, almost every country had an Omega-3 Index (O3I) in the "low" and "very low" ranges.

As of 2015 and 2019, the world does not produce enough omega-3 from traditional sources (fishmeal, fish oil, vegetable oil) to ensure an adequate supply for every living person. It is also unrealistic to expect a further increase in fish catches or in cropland used. Novel sources such as algae oil and genetically-modified organisms provide a hope of further growth.

=== Contamination ===
Fish at higher trophic levels may concentrate heavy metals from the environment into their bodies. However, heavy metal poisoning from consuming fish oil supplements is highly unlikely, because heavy metals (mercury, lead, nickel, arsenic, and cadmium) selectively bind with protein in the fish flesh rather than accumulate in the oil.

However, other contaminants (PCBs, furans, dioxins, and PBDEs) might be found, especially in less-refined fish oil supplements.

Throughout their history, the Council for Responsible Nutrition and the World Health Organization have published acceptability standards regarding contaminants in fish oil. The most stringent current standard is the International Fish Oils Standard. Fish oils that are molecularly distilled under vacuum typically make this highest-grade; levels of contaminants are stated in parts per billion per trillion.

=== Sustainability ===
The sustainability of current fish oil production has been questioned. Despite regulations, there are allegations of too many juvenile catches, which would reduce future fish populations and catches. As mentioned above, global fish catch has reached a plateau and it would not be realistic to expect further increases.

While not an endangered species, krill are a mainstay of the diets of many ocean-based species including whales, causing environmental and scientific concerns about their sustainability. The Commission for the Conservation of Antarctic Marine Living Resources sets catch limits, with current annual catches being around 0.3% of the unexploited biomass ("virgin size") of krill.

=== Rancidity ===
Polyunsaturated fatty acids such as omega-3 are easily oxidised by air, making them rancid. A 2022 study found that a number of products on the market used oxidised oils, with the rancidity often masked by flavourings. Another study in 2015 found that an average of 20% of products had excess oxidation. Whether rancid fish oil is harmful remains unclear. Some studies show that highly oxidised fish oil can have a negative impact on cholesterol levels. Animal testing showed that high doses have toxic effects. Furthermore, rancid oil is likely to be less effective than fresh fish oil.

== Research ==
The association between supplementation and a lower risk of all-cause mortality is inconclusive.

=== Cancer ===
There is insufficient evidence that supplementation with omega−3 fatty acids has an effect on different cancers. Omega−3 supplements do not improve body weight, muscle maintenance, or quality of life in cancer patients.

Some research has looked at whether omega‑3 supplements might help people who are going through chemotherapy or radiotherapy. A 2015 review of small studies, alongside more recent 2022 research, found signs that omega‑3s may help patients keep more of their body weight and muscle, support certain aspects of quality of life, and decrease treatment-related toxicity and inflammation. The evidence is still limited and the studies varied, so it is not known how meaningful these effects are, however, reviews note that patients taking omega‑3 supplements alongside conventional therapies do not do worse than those who do not. Similarly, a 2022 meta-analysis and a 2023 systematic review focusing on lung cancer patients undergoing radiotherapy and chemotherapy found that omega-3 supplementation helped improve nutritional status, such as maintaining body weight, and reduced markers of inflammation and treatment toxicity. Additionally, researchers are investigating the molecular mechanisms of omega-3s to see if they might help combat chemoresistance, particularly in breast cancer treatments.

Another analysis looking at adults receiving chemotherapy or radiotherapy found that high‑calorie oral nutritional supplements without omega‑3 fats did not help patients maintain their weight, while high‑protein supplements enriched with omega‑3s were linked with better weight maintenance than similar‑calorie products without omega‑3s.

=== Cardiovascular disease ===
Moderate and high quality evidence from a 2020 review showed that EPA and DHA, such as that found in omega−3 polyunsaturated fatty acid supplements, does not appear to improve mortality or cardiovascular health. There is weak evidence indicating that α-linolenic acid may be associated with a small reduction in the risk of a cardiovascular event or the risk of arrhythmia.

A 2018 meta-analysis found no support that daily intake of one gram of omega−3 fatty acid in individuals with a history of coronary heart disease prevents fatal coronary heart disease, nonfatal myocardial infarction, or any other vascular event, however, omega−3 fatty acid supplementation greater than one gram daily for at least one year may be protective against cardiac death, sudden death, and myocardial infarction in people who have a history of cardiovascular disease. No protective effect against the development of stroke or all-cause mortality was seen in this population. A 2021 meta-analysis found that supplementation was associated with a reduced risk of myocardial infarction and coronary heart disease.

Fish oil supplementation has not been shown to benefit revascularization or abnormal heart rhythms and has no effect on heart failure hospital admission rates. Furthermore, fish oil supplement studies have failed to support claims of preventing heart attacks or strokes. In the EU, a review by the European Medicines Agency of omega−3 fatty acid medicines containing a combination of an ethyl ester of eicosapentaenoic acid and docosahexaenoic acid at a dose of 1 g per day concluded that these medicines are not effective in secondary prevention of heart problems in people who have had a myocardial infarction.

Evidence suggests that omega−3 fatty acids modestly lower blood pressure (systolic and diastolic) in people with hypertension as well as in people with normal blood pressure. The American Heart Association position (2019) is that omega−3 fatty acid supplementation at a dose of 4 grams per day may be effective for reducing levels of blood triglycerides as a risk factor for cardiovascular diseases. Since 2004, the United States Food and Drug Administration (FDA) has approved four fish oil-based prescription drugs for the management of hypertriglyceridemia, namely Lovaza, Omtryg (both omega-3-acid ethyl esters), Vascepa (ethyl eicosapentaenoic acid), and Epanova (omega-3-carboxylic acids).

A 2019 review found that omega−3 fatty acid supplements make little or no difference to cardiovascular mortality and that people with myocardial infarction have no benefit in taking the supplements. A 2021 review found that omega−3 supplementation did not affect cardiovascular disease outcomes.

A 2021 review concluded that use of omega−3 supplements was associated with an increased risk of atrial fibrillation in people having high blood triglycerides. A meta-analysis showed that use of marine omega−3 supplementation was associated with an increased risk of atrial fibrillation, with the risk appearing to increase for doses greater than one gram per day.

=== Chronic kidney disease ===
In people with chronic kidney disease (CKD) who require hemodialysis, vascular blockage due to clotting may prevent dialysis therapy. Omega−3 fatty acids contribute to the production of eicosanoid molecules that reduce clotting. However, a Cochrane review in 2018 did not find clear evidence that omega−3 supplementation has any impact on the prevention of vascular blockage in people with CKD. There was also moderate certainty that supplementation did not prevent hospitalisation or death within a 12-month period.

=== Stroke ===
A 2022 Cochrane review of controlled trials did not find clear evidence that marine-derived omega−3 supplementation improves cognitive and physical recovery or social, and emotional wellbeing following stroke diagnosis, nor prevents stroke recurrence and mortality. In this review, mood appeared to worsen slightly among those receiving 3g fish oil supplementation for 12 weeks; psychometric scores changed by 1.41 (0.07 to 2.75) points less than those receiving palm and soy oil. However, this represented only a single small study and was not observed in a study lasting more than 3 months. Overall, the review was limited by the small amount of high-quality evidence available.

=== Inflammation ===
A 2013 systematic review found tentative evidence of benefit for lowering inflammation levels in healthy adults and in people with one or more biomarkers of metabolic syndrome. Consumption of omega−3 fatty acids from marine sources lowers blood markers of inflammation such as C-reactive protein, interleukin 6, and TNF alpha.

For rheumatoid arthritis, one systematic review found consistent but modest evidence for the effect of marine n−3 PUFAs on symptoms such as "joint swelling and pain, duration of morning stiffness, global assessments of pain and disease activity" as well as the use of non-steroidal anti-inflammatory drugs. The American College of Rheumatology has stated that there may be modest benefit from the use of fish oils, but that it may take months for effects to be seen, and cautions for possible gastrointestinal side effects and the possibility of the supplements containing mercury or vitamin A at toxic levels. The National Center for Complementary and Integrative Health has concluded that "supplements containing omega−3 fatty acids ... may help relieve rheumatoid arthritis symptoms" but warns that such supplements "may interact with drugs that affect blood clotting".

=== Developmental disabilities ===
One meta-analysis concluded that omega−3 fatty acid supplementation demonstrated a modest effect for improving ADHD symptoms. A Cochrane review of PUFA (not necessarily omega−3) supplementation found "there is little evidence that PUFA supplementation provides any benefit for the symptoms of ADHD in children and adolescents", while a different review found "insufficient evidence to draw any conclusion about the use of PUFAs for children with specific learning disorders". Another review concluded that the evidence is inconclusive for the use of omega−3 fatty acids in behavior and non-neurodegenerative neuropsychiatric disorders such as ADHD and depression.

A 2018 Cochrane systematic review with moderate to high quality of evidence suggested that omega−3 fatty acids may reduce risk of perinatal death, risk of low body weight babies; and possibly mildly increased LGA babies.

A 2021 umbrella review with moderate to high quality of evidence suggested that "omega-3 supplementation during pregnancy can exert favorable effects against pre-eclampsia, low-birth weight, pre-term delivery, and post-partum depression, and can improve anthropometric measures, immune system, and visual activity in infants and cardiometabolic risk factors in pregnant mothers."

=== Depressive disorders ===
A 2019 review found that omega−3 polyunsaturated fatty acids—particularly eicosapentaenoic acid (EPA)—had evidence for use as an adjunctive treatment of depression. The review noted that effects vary by formulation, population, and treatment duration, and are influenced by publication bias.

A 2021 systematic review concluded that despite widespread belief in their benefits, long-chain omega−3 (EPA and DHA) supplements likely have little or no effect on preventing or treating depression or anxiety. A 2021 Cochrane review concluded that current evidence suggests that omega−3 supplements may have a small, statistically detectable but not clinically meaningful effect on major depressive disorder, with low to very low certainty and high variability across studies.

Two reviews have suggested that omega−3 fatty acid supplementation improves depressive symptoms in perinatal women.

=== Cognitive aging ===
A 2016 review found no convincing evidence for the use of omega‐3 PUFA supplements in treatment of Alzheimer's disease or dementia. There is preliminary evidence of effect on mild cognitive problems, but none supporting an effect in healthy people or those with dementia. A 2020 review suggested that omega−3 supplementation has no effect on global cognitive function, but has a mild benefit in improving memory in non-demented adults.

A 2020 review concluded that long-chain omega−3 supplements do not deter cognitive decline in older adults.

=== Brain and visual functions ===
A major structural component of the mammalian brain, DHA is the most abundant omega−3 fatty acid in the brain. A 2015 review found that omega−3 PUFA supplementation had no effect on macular degeneration or development of visual loss.

=== Asthma ===
As of 2015, there was no evidence that taking omega−3 supplements can prevent asthma attacks in children.

=== Diabetes ===
A 2019 review found that omega−3 supplements have no effect on prevention and treatment of type 2 diabetes. A 2021 meta-analysis found that supplementation with omega−3 had positive effects on diabetes biomarkers, such as fasting blood glucose and insulin resistance.

=== Methodological issues ===
In contrast to dietary supplementation studies, there is significant difficulty in interpreting the literature regarding dietary intake of omega−3 fatty acids (e.g. from fish) due to participant recall and systematic differences in diets. There is also controversy as to the efficacy of omega−3, with many meta-analyses finding heterogeneity among results that may be explained mostly by publication bias. A significant correlation between shorter treatment trials was associated with increased omega−3 efficacy for treating depressed symptoms, further implicating bias in publication.

== See also ==
- Omega−3 acid ethyl esters – Pharmaceutical product
- Essential fatty acid interactions – Chemical interactions
- Essential nutrients – Substance that an organism uses to live
- Inflammation – Physical effects resulting from activation of the immune system
- Olive oil regulation and adulteration
- Omega−6 fatty acid – Fatty acids where the sixth bond is double
- Omega−7 fatty acid – Class of unsaturated fatty acids
- Omega−9 fatty acid – Family of unsaturated fatty acids
- Ratio of fatty acids in different foods – Proportion of omega-3 to omega-6 fatty acids in a diet
- Reinforced lipids – Deuterated lipid molecules
