= CRN =

CRN, or crn, may refer to:

== Business ==
- CRN International, an American radio marketing company
- CRN S.p.A, a luxury yacht brand owned by the Ferretti Group
- Cornell Companies, a defunct American private prison company
- Congress Rental Network, an audiovisual technology trade association
- Council for Responsible Nutrition, an American dietary supplement trade association

== Media ==
- CRN (magazine), an American technology trade magazine
- CRN Digital Talk Radio Networks, an American radio network
- Calvary Radio Network, a radio station network in the United States
- Community Radio Network (Australia), a radio program distributor
- Community Radio Network (New Zealand), a radio network

== Politics ==
- National Reconciliation Committee (Comité de réconciliation nationale), a Malagasy political coalition founded by Albert Zafy
- National Reconciliation Council (Niger) (Conseil de réconciliation nationale), a governing body during the Fourth Republic of Niger
- National Revolutionary Committee (Comité Revolucionario Nacional), a participant in the Jaca uprising in Spain

== Science ==
- Chemical reaction network, in mathematical chemistry
- Chromium nitride, a chemical compound
- Common Random Numbers, a statistical procedure
- Concentration ratio, a measure of market concentration in economics
- Cross-polytope of n-dimensions, in geometry
- US Climate Reference Network, a network of climate stations in the United States
- Neurosciences Research Center (Centre de recherche en neurosciences), a research organization at Université Laval, Québec, Canada
- The IMA symbol for corundum
- Carrington Rotation Number in Solar astronomy

== Technology ==
- CRN 91 Naval Gun, an Indian naval autocannon
- AN/CRN, a series of United States military radio transmitters
- Cognos ReportNet, business intelligence software

== Transportation ==
- Community Rail Network, a British rail association
- Country Regional Network, a rail network in New South Wales, Australia
- CRN, the Amtrak code for Creston (Amtrak station), Iowa, US
- CRN, the ICAO code for Aero Caribbean, merged into Cubana in 2015
- CRN, the ICAO code for Carson Air Ltd, a Canadian air ambulance operator
- CRN, the National Rail code for Crowthorne railway station, Berkshire, UK
- CRN, the reporting mark for the Carolina and Northwestern Railway, US

== Other uses ==
- Canadian Registration Number, in Canadian boiler safety regulation
- Certified Radiologic Nurse, a nursing certification
- Chinese Rainbow Network, an LGBT-related organization in China
- Conflict Risk Network, a program of the defunct Genocide Intervention Network
- Cora language, an indigenous language of Mexico
