= Nature Made =

American dietary supplement and vitamin brand

- Industry: Dietary supplements
- Founded: 1971
- Founders: Henry Burdick, Barry Pressman
- Headquarters: Southern California
- Parent: Pharmavite
- Website: naturemade.com

Nature Made is an American dietary supplement and vitamin brand founded in 1971 by Barry Pressman and Henry Burdick. Nature Made began operating as a brand of Pharmavite as of this date. Parent company Pharmavite was acquired by Otsuka Pharmaceutical in 1989. As of August 2023, Nature Made was manufacturing over 150 different types of supplements.

== History ==
In 1971, Barry Pressman and Henry Burdick launched Nature Made, inspired by the belief that “there was a better alternative to long term health than prescription drugs.” The company joined the Council for Responsible Nutrition (CRN) in 1981. Nature Made began operating as a brand of Pharmavite as of this date. Parent company Pharmavite was acquired by Otsuka Pharmaceutical in 1989.

In 2002, a Nature Made product became the first dietary supplement verified by United States Pharmacopeia (USP). In 2016, Nature Made became the first company to prepare a USP-verified gummy brand.

As of August 2023, Nature Made was manufacturing over 150 different types of supplements.
