= Proxmire Amendments =

US legislation related to dietary supplements

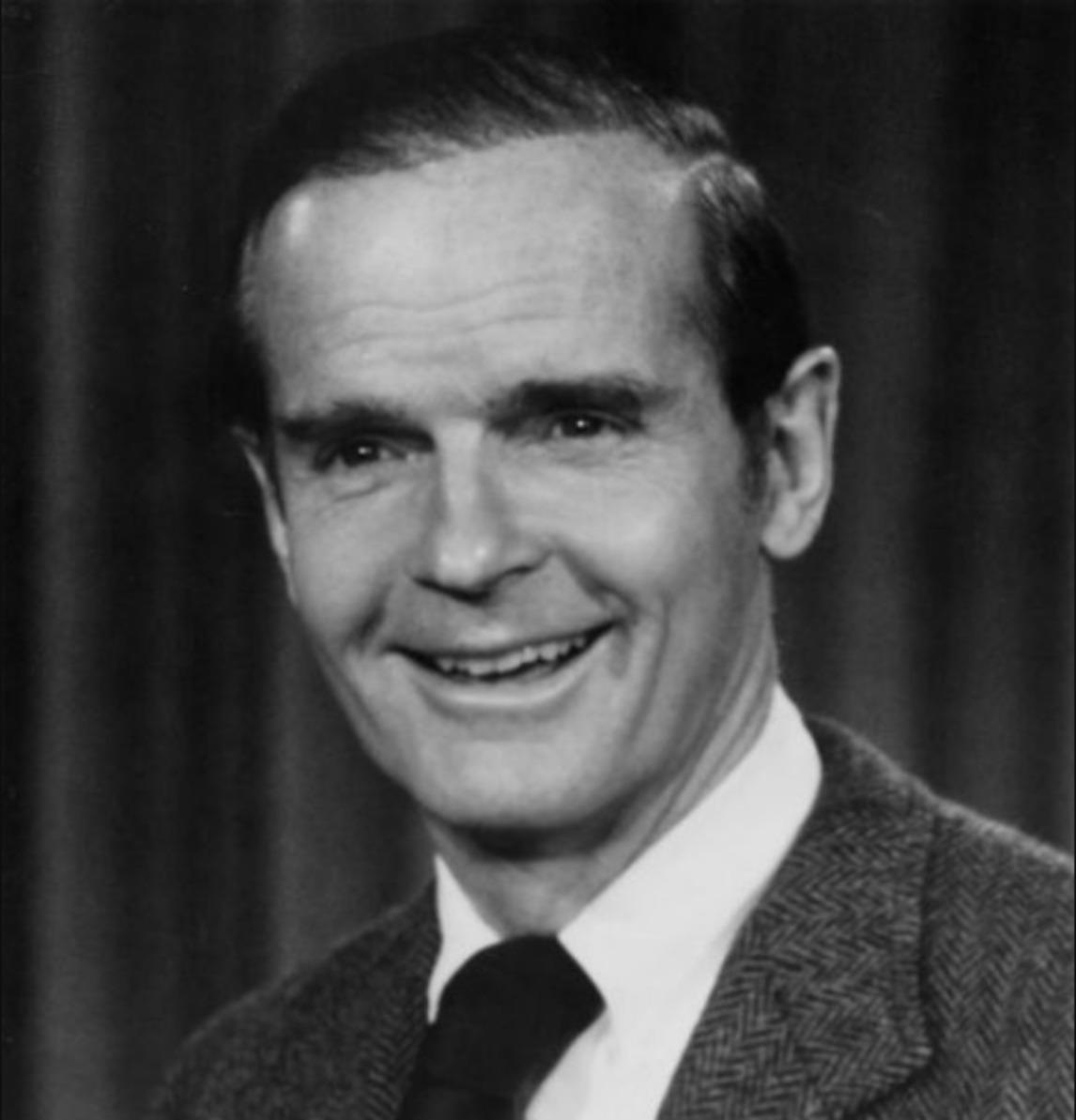
William Proxmire

The Proxmire Amendments, enacted as title V of the Health Research and Health Services Amendments of 1976, are provisions in Federal law which prohibit the Food and Drug Administration from limiting the potency of vitamins and minerals found in dietary supplements. It also made it so that food supplements could not be classified as drugs, making their sale possible without a prescription. William Proxmire, a Senator for Wisconsin, is behind the name of such amendments. The Proxmire Amendment is also known as The Rogers-Proxmire Amendment of 1976. Much of the amendments are found in section 411 of the Federal Food, Drug, and Cosmetic Act.

== History ==
The dietary supplement industry has alleged regulatory bias in regard to their products. In 1976, the Food and Drug Administration attempted to restrict certain particular formulations of dietary supplement. The Food and Drug Administration cited evidence stating that such could be dangerous if taken in large doses. A letter writing campaign resulted in the Food and Drug Administration's proposed rule being withdrawn.

== Public Opinion ==
As of 1994, not quite half of Americans took dietary supplements regularly. J.B. Cordaro, president of the Council for Responsible Nutrition said about the Proxmire Amendment, "Rogers-Proxmire meant the survival of our industry... Without that, the Food and Drug Administration...could have crippled us." Dieticians have warned of the dangers of unregulated supplements, saying that they are misleading and are actually not as useful as they are marketed to be.

== Lasting Effects ==
The Proxmire Amendment outlawed the Food and Drug Administration from regulating potency of vitamin and mineral supplements. The mineral and vitamin supplements industry continued to grow in the '80s as did the reports of illnesses and deaths due to the overconsumption of specific vitamins, minerals, and supplements. Because of the passing of the Proxmire amendment and Dietary Supplement Health and Education Act, the dietary supplement industry has had a large increase in revenue and sales, around $30 billion. Back in 2015 they had more than 85,000 products selling in stores that didn’t help improve health in any way. Manufacturers of dietary supplements don’t have to give the full background and overall safety information to the Food and Drug Administration before releasing the products. The Food and Drug Administration has no other choice than to try to determine the health risks and benefits of products from the information companies release to the public, and the experiments they can hold in their own laboratories. As part of the Proxmire Amendment, the Food and Drug Administration does not schedule routine inspections of companies that produce dietary supplements. Instead, the Food and Drug Administration waits until a consumer files a complaint and then they oversee an investigation into that specific supplement's risks.

From the 1960s to present, the Food and Drug Administration's relationship with American consumers has changed drastically. In the 1960s, there were not as many options and opinions regarding things such as food, medicine, hygiene products, among other things that were available to purchase in stores. The Food and Drug Administration used to see the consumer as a passive and relatively uninformed about their purchases. It was common for them to trust what they read without doing any research. This made it necessary to put regulations in place for many things, including dietary supplements.

The Food and Drug Administration is not permitted to regulate the contents of dietary supplements.

== Current legislation ==
After the 1976 Proxmire Amendment was put in place, the Food and Drug Administration continued to fight for the regulation of minerals and dietary supplements. In 1993, an attempt was made to lay more restrictions and rules on dietary supplements under another name. The Food and Drug Administration attempted to call them unapproved food additives and drugs in the hopes that they would then be able to regulate them in supplements. However, the public and the media were not receptive to this new labeling of supplements. In response to the push back from the public, the government put the Dietary Supplement Health and Education Act in place. The Dietary Supplement Health and Education Act provided more regulations on dietary supplements, therefore, further limiting the Food and Drug Administration’s ability to regulate the ingredients and risks of these products. The Dietary Supplement Health and Education Act required supplements that contained new ingredients to be marked so that consumers were aware. Manufacturers were required to give the Food and Drug Administration the background of why new ingredients they were adding were deemed safe for public use. The companies, however, could still promote their product before giving the Food and Drug Administration that information. The Dietary Supplement Health and Education Act made it easier for companies, such as J.R. Carlson's Laboratories, to better educate their consumers as they considered buying their products in an effort to increase their personal health. The Proxmire Amendments made it so that the Food and Drug Administration was unable to regulate the contents of supplements, but the Dietary Supplement Health and Education Act modified that and provided guidelines for labeling. However, if a dietary supplement makes a claim to have the same benefits as a drug, it is required to be verified and go through the same process as a drug to gain market approval. The Food and Drug Administration considers moderate amounts of vitamins and minerals to be generally safe without premarket approval. The information put on the safety labels is not the only thing that the Food and Drug Administration needs to consider. The different composition and quality of products can be more detrimental to health and is more important, in some cases, than the inherent safety of a product. The Food and Drug Administration is restricted from that information, however, and can not be entirely sure of the composition of certain products. In summary, the Proxmire Amendment and Dietary Supplement Health and Education Act are still in place, therefore, the Food and Drug Administration's ability to regulate dietary and mineral supplements is minimal and restricted.
