= Pharmavite =

American vitamin and supplement company

Pharmavite, LLC
- Company type: Subsidiary
- Industry: Dietary supplements
- Founded: 1971
- Founders: Henry Burdick, Barry Pressman
- Headquarters: Northridge, California, United States
- Key people: Jeffrey Boutelle (CEO)
- Products: Nature Made
- Parent: Otsuka Pharmaceutical
- Website: Pharmavite.com

Pharmavite is an American vitamin and supplement company, based in West Hills, California and founded in 1971 by Barry Pressman and Henry Burdick. Its Nature Made vitamin brand was launched that same year. It was acquired by Otsuka Pharmaceutical in 1989.

Pharmavite works with the United States Pharmacopeia's (USP) Dietary Supplements Verification Program on some of its products. Jeff Boutelle is CEO of Pharmavite.

== History ==
In 1971, Pharmavite was founded in Los Angeles, California by entrepreneur Henry Burdick and pharmacist Barry Pressman, who felt "there was a better alternative to long term health than prescription drugs". Its brand Nature Made was also founded that year.

In 1981, Pharmavite joined the Council for Responsible Nutrition (CRN). Otsuka Pharmaceutical acquired Pharmavite in 1989.

In 2014, Pharmavite acquired FoodState Inc., a maker of whole food supplements, sold under the MegaFood brand.

Equelle, Pharmavite's nonprescription, non-hormonal supplement that alleviates hot flash frequency and muscle aches associated with menopause, was launched in 2019. The supplement relies on S-equol, an intestinal bacterial metabolite of isoflavone daidzein2 that binds to select estrogen receptors in the body.

In 2020, Pharmavite launched Nurish by Nature Made, a personalized vitamin and supplement subscription service.

Pharmaite acquired Uqora, a urinary tract health brand offering health supplements and UTI symptom relief products, and expanded its Women's Health Business Unit in 2021.

In 2022, Pharmavite launched Nature Made Wellblends, a line of scientifically-designed blends that target sleep, stress & immune health needs.

In November 2023, Pharmavite acquired Bonafide Health, a menopause solutions company, for $425 million.

== Brands ==
- Nature Made
- MegaFood
- Equelle
- Nurish by Nature Made
- Uqora
- Nature Made Wellblends

== Locations ==
Pharmavite has locations in San Fernando, California; Valencia, California (two locations); Opelika, Alabama; and New Albany, Ohio. The San Fernando facility opened in 1987. It is the primary facility for manufacturing tablets and softgels.

The Opelika manufacturing facility opened in 2013 and is now the main manufacturer of gummy vitamins for the company. In 2021, there was an $8 million expansion of the facility. In 2023, Pharmavite broke ground on a new production facility in New Albany, Ohio. It is expected to begin production in 2024 and will be the site of Pharmavite’s Gummy Center of Excellence.
