= Connecticut Business Hall of Fame =

The Connecticut Business Hall of Fame, established in 2005, is an organization created to feature the accomplishments of companies and business leaders and to promote future business activities in the state of Connecticut in the United States.

Connecticut has often been in competition with the states of Massachusetts and New York. Both Boston and the New York City metro area have attracted better economic development opportunities than Connecticut. In the past, Connecticut officials have fought to keep defense dollars in the state and have started to promote Connecticut's tourism industry to national audiences.

Connecticut has also become the home of two of the world's largest casinos, the Mohegan Sun and Foxwoods. These facilities have grown into huge entertainment and resort complexes that pull resources from all over Connecticut and contribute to the region. During 2006, the state slowly announced a couple of economic incentive programs in order to attract national business interest. Through the state legislature, an initiative was passed to provide film production companies with significant tax credits in order to stimulate economic growth. The state also stepped up its involvement with grant and incentive tax breaks to establish several new business and residential development programs including one at the former United Technologies Corporation campus in East Hartford. State government and private companies have also taken the lead in aggressively marketing and promoting minor league sports clubs, as well as college sports including University of Connecticut basketball and football teams.

The Connecticut Business Hall of Fame was created to solidify Connecticut's role in the global business community. Director of the Connecticut Business Hall of Fame, Ron Dresner stated that he intends to build an awareness globally about how Connecticut has contributed to the success of so many businesses throughout the years and how talented business leaders flourished in Connecticut.

Already, the organization has gathered support throughout the state as it has created an extensive monthly business networking program which has featured speakers such as then Connecticut Attorney General Richard Blumenthal, Connecticut Technology Council President Matthew Nemerson and Business New Haven publisher Mitchell Young. Other featured speakers and panelists included business management consultants/authors Charles Miller and Claire Thaine, Goodwin College president Mark Scheinberg, Connecticut First Coalition Director Charles LeConche and Middlesex Chamber of Commerce President Larry McHugh.

During its first year, the organization has attracted over 10,000 regional business professionals to the various networking and industry-specific events that it co-sponsored. From business technology updates for business owners, monthly networking events to sales seminars for managers, the Connecticut Business Hall of Fame has made an impact connecting companies throughout the state.

== Class of 2006 ==
In March 2007, the organization held its first Annual Induction Award Ceremony in Hartford. Named as the "Class of 2006" and inducted were Herb Barker, CEO, Barker Specialty Company, Cheshire; John Farnham, executive director, Associated General Contractors of Connecticut, Wethersfield; Barry Berman, president and S. Richard Kalt, executive vice-president, CRN International, Hamden; and Subway restaurants, Milford.

== Class of 2007 ==
After a successful second year that included technology, green/environmental, entertainment and financial industry events, the Connecticut Business Hall of Fame in March 2008 inducted the "Class of 2007". The inductees included two Connecticut business leaders and two Connecticut-based companies. These inductees are Better Bedding, East Hartford; Splash Car Wash, Stamford; Chris Campbell, CEO and creative director, Palace Production Center, South Norwalk; and Paul Blanco, managing director, Barnum Financial Group, Shelton. Several state officials welcomed the "Class of 2007" at the induction ceremonies including Connecticut Secretary of State Susan Bysiewicz, Connecticut Comptroller Nancy Wyman and Connecticut Attorney General Richard Blumenthal. As its role in healthcare is expanding throughout the state, Connecticut Children's Medical Center COO Wendy Warring addressed the group at the ceremonies about the leading role of quality healthcare for all Connecticut families and the business community's support.

In January 2009, the organization's board of directors expanded to include business and nonprofit leaders from throughout Connecticut including: Jeffrey Cohen, ImageWorks; Ron Dresner, Dennis PR Group; James Duffy, James Duffy Companies; Sam Gejdenson, Sam Gejdenson International; Steven Goldthwaite, CyberSecurity Systems; Richard Greenfield, NRG Publishing; Jonathan Hochman, Hochman & Associates; William Kenney, Networking You; Charles H. Miller, The Coaching Partnership; Ira Nozik, Nozik Photography; Laurie O'Neil, Innovative Financial Services; Rene Rodriguez, Babbalu.com; Mike Scricca, Connecticut Technology Council; and Fred Wergeles, Fred Wergeles & Associates.

== Class of 2008 ==
The Connecticut Business Hall of Fame kicked off its third year with a scheduled statewide networking event in Hartford in April 2009 with featured speaker Rob Simmons, former U.S. Congressman and presently the official business advocate for the state of Connecticut. In April 2009, the organization held its third annual induction event. With an emphasis on community involvement and over 200 nominations considered, the "Class of 2008" included leaders Gloria McAdam, Foodshare and Jim Barnes, Oakleaf Waste Management along with the Connecticut Economic Resource Center, Stafford Motor Speedway and Alcoa Howmet. Ron Dresner, director, Connecticut Business Hall of Fame, welcomed guest speakers Connecticut Attorney General Richard Blumenthal and Connecticut Secretary of State Susan Bysiewicz at the event.

In April 2010, the Connecticut Business Hall of Fame held its annual induction ceremony in Hartford. Welcoming the "Class of 2010", Ron Dresner, director of the Connecticut Business Hall of Fame, along with over 350 attendees congratulated Manafort Brothers, Inc.; Goodwin College; Community Renewal Team; William McGurk from Rockville Bank; and Doug Gunthrie from Comcast as the newest inductees.

The Class of 2011 inductees comprised Pilgrim Furniture City, Channel 3 Kids Camp, Bloomfield Bicycle & Repair Shop, Basement Systems, Inc., and Central CT State University's Institute of Technology & Business Development.

== See also ==
- History of Connecticut industry
- Gold Coast (Connecticut)

== News articles ==
- Journal Inquirer 2009 Induction News
