= Fish oil =

Oil derived from the tissues of oily fish

Fish oil is oil derived from the tissues of oily fish. Fish oils contain the omega−3 fatty acids eicosapentaenoic acid (EPA) and docosahexaenoic acid (DHA), precursors of certain eicosanoids that are known to reduce inflammation in the body and improve hypertriglyceridemia. There has been a great deal of controversy in the 21st century about the role of fish oil in cardiovascular disease, with recent meta-analyses reaching different conclusions about its potential impact.

The fish used as sources do not actually produce omega−3 fatty acids. Instead, the fish accumulate the acids by consuming either microalgae or prey fish that have accumulated omega−3 fatty acids. Fatty predatory fish, like sharks, swordfish, tilefish, and albacore tuna, may be high in omega−3 fatty acids, but due to their position at the top of the food chain, these species may also accumulate toxic substances through biomagnification. For this reason, the United States Environmental Protection Agency recommends limiting consumption (especially for women of childbearing age) of certain (predatory) fish species (e.g., albacore tuna, shark, king mackerel, tilefish and swordfish) due to high levels of the toxic contaminant mercury. Dioxins, like PCBs and chlordane, as well as other chlorinated cyclodiene insecticides are also present. Fish oil is used in aquaculture feed, in particular for feeding farmed salmon.

Marine and freshwater fish oil vary in contents of arachidonic acid, EPA and DHA. The various species range from lean to fatty, and their oil content in the tissues has been shown to vary from 0.7% to 14.5%. They also differ in their effects on organ lipids. Studies have revealed that there is no relation between either 1) total fish intake or 2) estimated omega−3 fatty acid intake from all fish and serum omega−3 fatty acid concentrations. Only fatty fish intake, particularly salmonid, and estimated EPA + DHA intake from fatty fish has been observed to be significantly associated with increase in serum EPA + DHA.

The United States Food and Drug Administration (FDA) has approved four fish oil-based prescription drugs for the management of hypertriglyceridemia, namely Lovaza, Omtryg (both omega-3-acid ethyl esters), Vascepa (ethyl eicosapentaenoic acid), and Epanova (omega-3-carboxylic acids). None of these drugs are actually fish oil; they are all derivatives of acids found in fish oil.

== Uses ==
Often marketed and sold for consumption as part of the diet or in dietary supplements in contemporary societies, fish oils also have found roles in external use, as emollients or as general ointments as well as in body art, or for alleged insulation against cold temperatures.

Fishmeal and fish oil are the principal sources of omega-3 long-chain polyunsaturated fatty acids (eicosapentaenoic acid [EPA] and docosahexaenoic acid [DHA]) in animal feed.

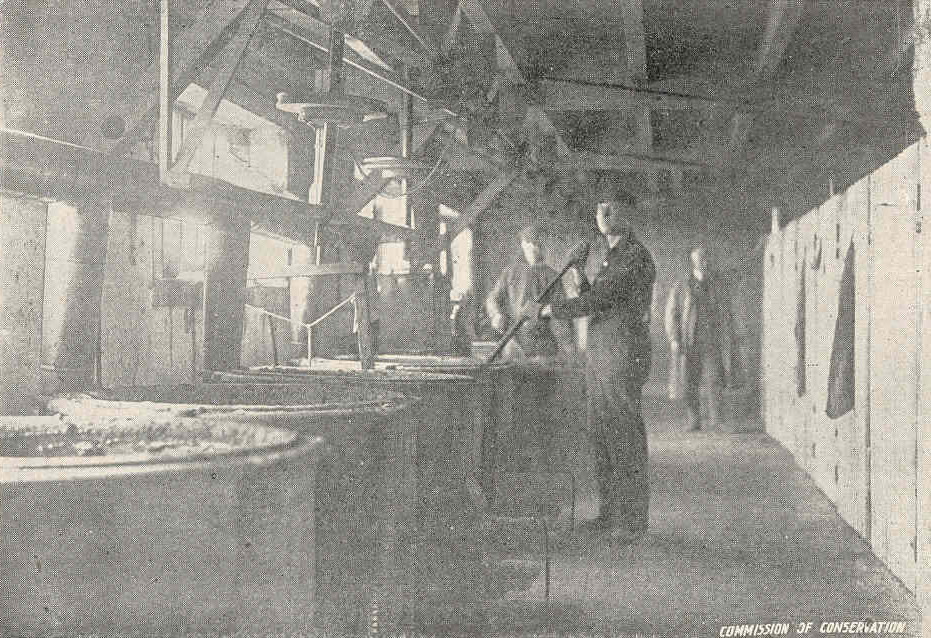
Fish oil rendering in Port Dover, Ontario, 1918

== Food sources ==
The most widely available dietary source of EPA and DHA is cold-water oily fish, such as salmon, herring, mackerel, anchovies, and sardines. Oils from these fish have around seven times as much omega−3 oils as omega−6 oils. Other oily fish, such as tuna, also contain omega−3 in somewhat lesser amounts. Although fish is a dietary source of omega−3 oils, fish do not synthesize them; they obtain them from the algae (microalgae in particular) or plankton in their diets.

EPA and DHA are available as dietary supplements most commonly as fish oil capsules, softgels, and gummies,^{1} krill oil, and less commonly as algae oil.^{2} Generally, salmon oil has more DHA than EPA while other fish oils such as herring, mackerel, anchovies, sardines, and pollock have more EPA than DHA. (See Supplements section below.)

Grams of omega−3 fatty acids per 3 oz (85 g) serving of popular fish.
Common name	grams
Herring, sardines	1.3–2
Spanish mackerel, Atlantic, Pacific	1.1–1.7
Salmon	1.1–1.9
Halibut	0.60–1.12
Tuna	0.21–1.1
Swordfish	0.97
Greenshell/lipped mussels	0.95
Tilefish	0.90
Tuna (canned, light)	0.17–0.24
Pollock	0.45
Cod	0.15–0.24
Catfish	0.22–0.3
Flounder	0.48
Grouper	0.23
Mahi mahi	0.13
Orange roughy	0.028
Red snapper	0.29
Shark	0.83
King mackerel	0.36
Hoki (blue grenadier)	0.41
Silver gemfish	0.40
Blue eye cod	0.31
Sydney rock oyster	0.30
Tuna, canned	0.23
Snapper	0.22
Barramundi, saltwater	0.100
Giant tiger prawn	0.100

For comparison, note the omega−3 levels in some common non-fish foods:

Grams of omega−3 fatty acids per 3 oz (85 g) serving of common non-fish foods.
Name	grams
Flaxseeds	19.55
Chia seeds	14.8
Hemp seeds	7.4
Walnut	1.7
Soybean	1.1
Butter	0.27
Eggs, large regular	0.109
Lean red meat	0.031
Turkey (bird)	0.030
Cereals, rice, pasta, etc.	0.00
Fruit	0.00
Milk, regular	0.00
Bread, regular	0.00
Vegetables	0.00

== Research ==
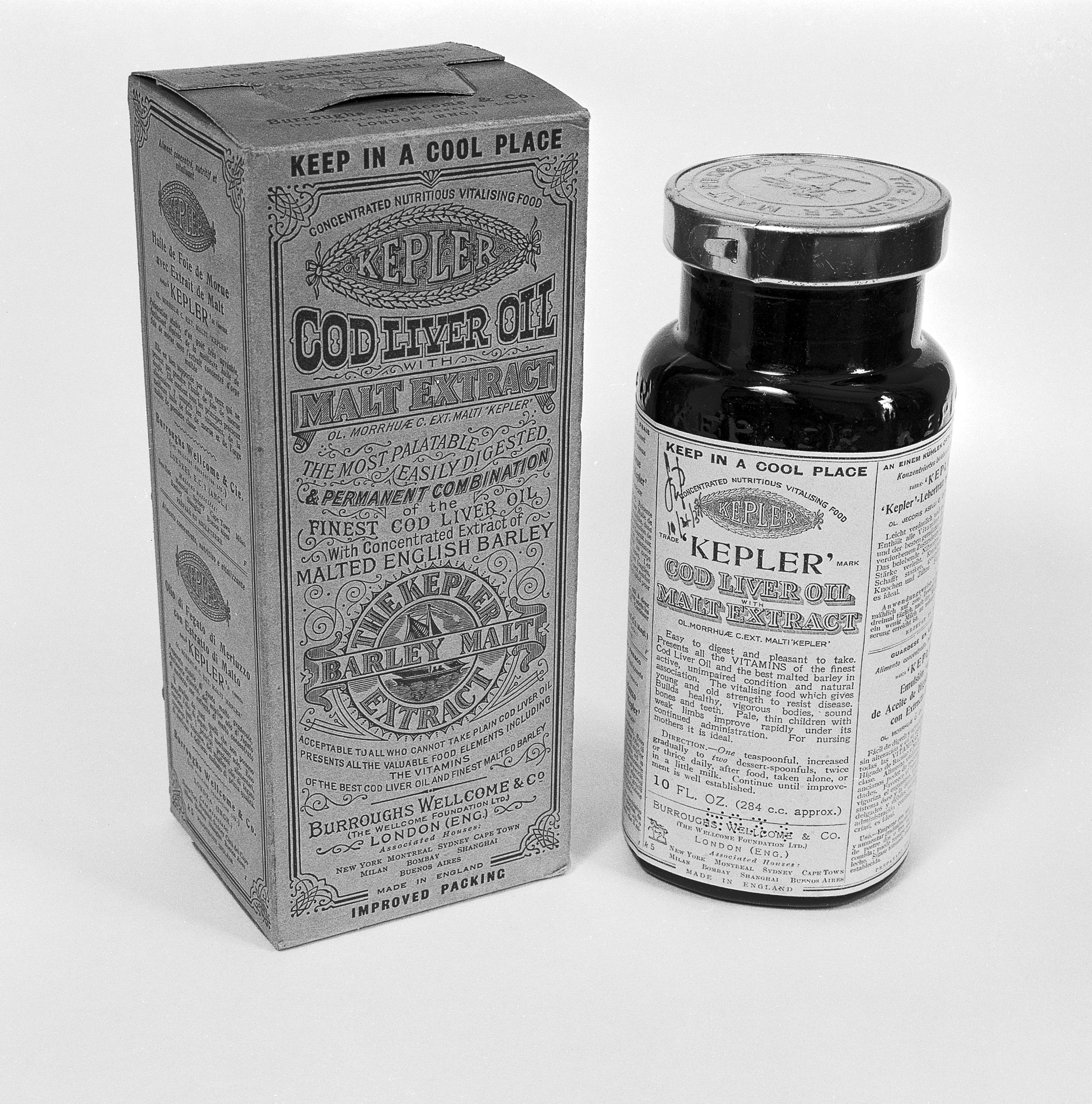
Kepler cod liver oil with malt extract

=== History ===
Fish oil became one of the earliest dietary supplements during 1870s, and by the end of the 19th century, was used as a treatment for many diseases, including such ailments as tuberculosis and hysteria. The possible effects of fish oil and omega−3 fatty acids have since been studied in clinical depression, anxiety, cancer, and macular degeneration, yet they have not been proven effective.

Crude fish oil as it is originally sold (especially cod liver oil) contains vitamin A and vitamin D, which was useful in preventing vitamin A deficiency and vitamin D deficiency (the latter manifesting as rickets in urban children). Modern fish oil supplements purified for omega-3 do not claim to contain these two vitamins.

=== Various recommendations ===
In a 2009 letter on a pending revision to the Dietary Guidelines for Americans, the American Heart Association recommended 250–500 mg/day of EPA and DHA. The Guidelines were revised again for 2015–2020; included is a recommendation that adults consume at least eight ounces of a variety of seafood per week, which provide an average of 250 mg/day of EPA + DHA. The Food and Drug Administration recommends not exceeding 3 grams per day of EPA + DHA from all sources, with no more than 2 grams per day from dietary supplements.

=== Prostate cancer ===
There is no good evidence that fish oil supplementation is of benefit for prostate cancer, and omega-3 fatty acids may increase the cancer risk.

=== Cardiovascular ===
There is uncertainty about the role of fish oil in cardiovascular disease, with reviews reaching different conclusions about its potential impact. Multiple evaluations suggest fish oil has little or no reduction in cardiovascular mortality, although there may be a small reduction in the incidence of actual cardiac events and strokes with its use. In 2007, the American Heart Association recommended the consumption of 1 gram of fish oil daily, preferably by eating fish, for patients with coronary artery disease, but cautioned pregnant and nursing women to avoid eating fish with high potential for mercury contaminants including mackerel, shark, and swordfish. (Optimal dosage was related to body weight.)

The US National Institutes of Health lists three conditions for which fish oil and other omega−3 sources are most highly recommended: hypertriglyceridemia (high triglyceride level), preventing secondary cardiovascular disease, and hypertension (high blood pressure). It then lists 27 other conditions for which there is less evidence. It also lists possible safety concerns: "Intake of 3 grams per day or greater of omega-3 fatty acids may increase the risk of bleeding, although there is little evidence of significant bleeding risk at lower doses. Very large intakes of fish oil or omega-3 fatty acids may increase the risk of hemorrhagic (bleeding) stroke."

There were studies to determine if fish oil had an effect on certain abnormal heart rhythms, although a 2012 meta-analysis found no significant effect.

A 2008 meta-study found fish oil supplementation did not demonstrate any preventative benefit to cardiac patients with ventricular arrhythmias. A 2012 meta-analysis covering 20 studies and 68,680 patients, found that omega−3 fatty acid supplementation did not reduce the chance of death, cardiac death, heart attack, or stroke. A 2018 meta-analysis of 77,000 participants found a 3% reduction in the relative risk for those who supplemented fish oil; however, this effect was deemed insignificant.

=== Mental health ===
A 2008 Cochrane systematic review found that limited data is available. In the one eligible study, omega−3s were an effective adjunctive therapy for depressive but not manic symptoms in bipolar disorder. The authors found an "acute need" for more randomised controlled trials.

A 2009 metastudy found that patients taking omega−3 supplements with a higher EPA:DHA ratio experienced fewer depressive symptoms. The studies provided evidence that EPA may be more efficacious than DHA in treating depression. However, this metastudy concluded that due to the identified limitations of the included studies, larger, randomized trials are needed to confirm these findings.

In a 2011 meta-analysis of PubMed articles about fish oil and depression from 1965 to 2010, researchers found that "nearly all of the treatment efficacy observed in the published literature may be attributable to publication bias."

A 2014 meta-analysis of eleven trials conducted respectively on patients with a DSM-defined diagnosis of major depressive disorder (MDD) and of eight trials with patients with depressive symptomatology but no diagnosis of MDD demonstrated significant clinical benefit of omega−3 PUFA treatment compared to placebo. The study concluded that: "The use of omega-3 PUFA is effective in patients with diagnosis of MDD and on depressive patients without diagnosis of MDD."

==== Antidepressant ====
A 2019 meta-analysis concluded that EPA ≥ 60% at a dosage of ≤1 g/d may have antidepressant effect.

=== Alzheimer's disease ===
A Cochrane meta-analysis published in June 2012 found no significant protective effect for cognitive decline for those aged 60 and over and who started taking fatty acids after this age. A co-author of the study said to Time, "Our analysis suggests that there is currently no evidence that omega-3 fatty acid supplements provide a benefit for memory or concentration in later life".

=== Psoriasis ===
Diets supplemented with cod liver oil have shown beneficial effects on psoriasis.

=== Pregnancy ===
Some studies reported better psychomotor development at 30 months of age in infants whose mothers received fish oil supplements for the first four months of lactation. In addition, five-year-old children whose mothers received modest algae based docosahexaenoic acid supplementation for the first 4 months of breastfeeding performed better on a test of sustained attention. This suggests that docosahexaenoic acid intake during early infancy confers long-term benefits on specific aspects of neurodevelopment.

In addition, provision of fish oil during pregnancy may reduce an infant's sensitization to common food allergens and reduce the prevalence and severity of certain skin diseases in the first year of life. This effect may persist until adolescence with a reduction in prevalence and/or severity of eczema, hay fever and asthma.

=== Crohn's disease ===
A 2014 Cochrane review found that, based on two large studies, fish oil supplements did not appear to be effective for maintenance of remission in Crohn's disease.

== Supplements ==
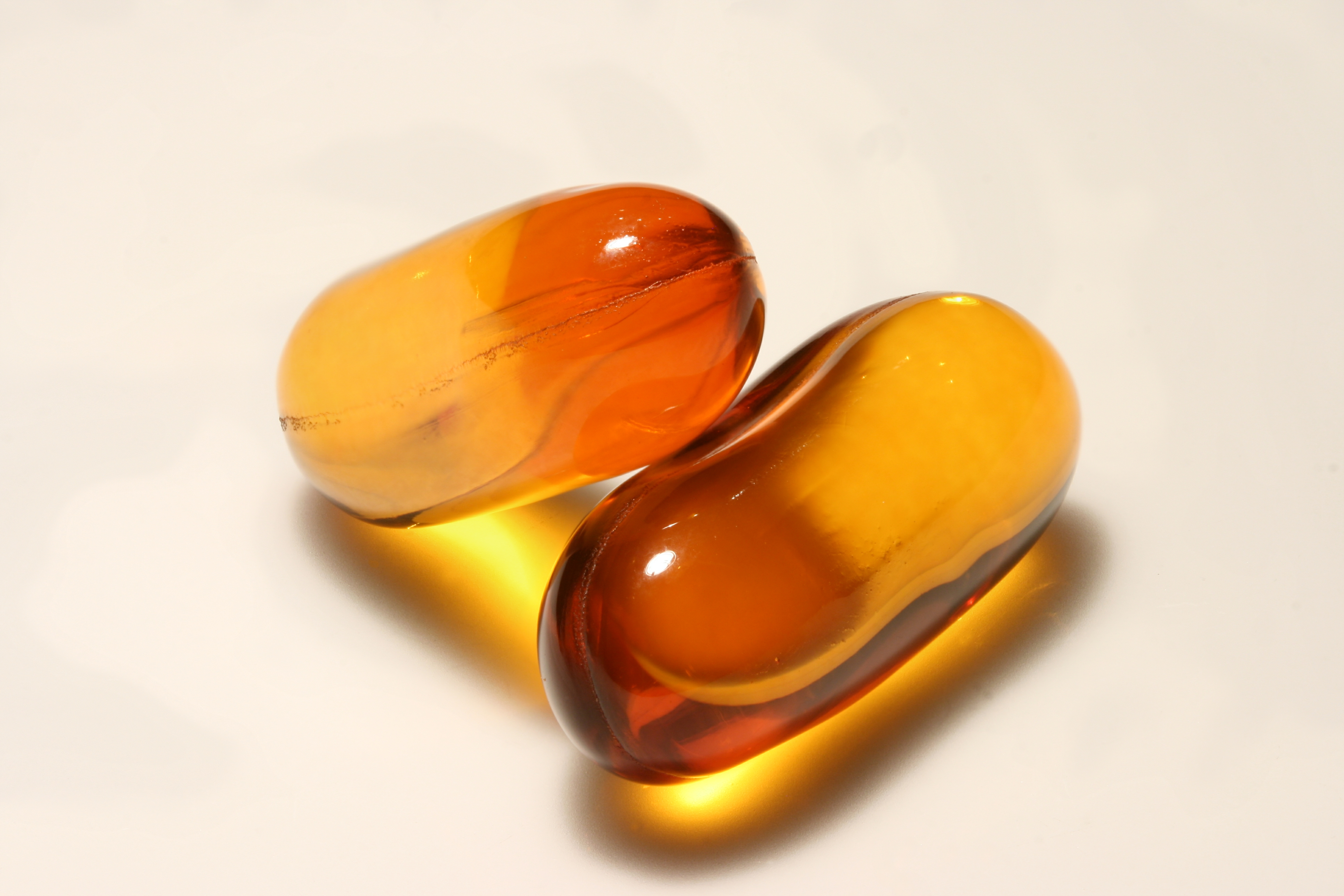
Fish oil capsules

Fish oil is a commonly used dietary supplement, with sales in the US reaching $976 million in 2009. By 2020 the global omega−3 supplement market size had reached $5.58 billion, and fish oil based supplements accounted for 63.1% of that market.

=== Formulation ===
Fish oil supplements are available mainly as liquids or capsules. Most of these capsules are single-piece gel capsules or softgels. Also available are enteric-coated capsules that pass through the stomach before dissolving in the small intestine, thus helping prevent indigestion and "fish burps". Poorly manufactured enteric-coated products have the potential to release ingredients too early. ConsumerLab.com, a for-profit supplement testing company, reported that 1 of the 24 enteric-coated fish oil supplements it evaluated released ingredients prematurely. Fish oil products may use other techniques to hide the fishy taste. For example, added lemon or strawberry flavor tends to produce a more agreeable product and are usually present in fish oil gummies.

=== EPA and DHA content ===
Generally, oily fish have more EPA than DHA versus salmon which has more DHA than EPA. To illustrate the amounts of EPA and DHA in supplements, a softgel capsule containing fish oil derived from pollock might contain a total of 642 mg of total fish oil, of which 584 mg are omega−3 fatty acids, with 377 mg EPA and 158 mg DHA.^{3} That same company's salmon oil softgel contains 1008 mg of total fish oil, of which 295 mg are omega−3 fatty acids, with 95 mg EPA and 118 mg DHA.^{4}

According to ConsumerLab.com tests, the concentrations of EPA and DHA in supplements can vary from between 8 and 80% fish oil content. The concentration depends on the source of the omega−3s, how the oil is processed, and the amounts of other ingredients included in the supplement. However, the bioavailability of EPA and DHA from both capsular and emulsified fish oils has been shown to be high. A ConsumerLab.com publication in 2010 stated that 3 of 24 fish oil supplements tested contained less EPA and/or DHA than was claimed on the label. A 2012 report stated that 4 of 35 fish oil supplements that were tested contained less EPA or DHA than was claimed on the label, and 3 of 35 contained more.

=== Quality and concerns ===
Problems of quality have been identified in periodic tests by independent researchers of marketed supplements containing fish oil and other marine oils. These problems may include contamination, inaccurate listing of EPA and DHA levels, spoilage, and formulation issues.

==== Contamination ====
A report by the Harvard Medical School studied five popular brands of fish oil, including Nordic Ultimate, Kirkland and CVS. They found that the brands had "negligible amounts of mercury, suggesting either that mercury is removed during the manufacturing of purified fish oil or that the fish sources used in these commercial preparations are relatively mercury-free". There appears to be little risk of contamination by microorganisms, proteins, lysophospholipids, cholesterol, and trans-fats.

==== Dioxins and PCBs ====
Dioxins and PCBs may be carcinogenic at low levels of exposure over time. These substances are identified and measured in one of two categories, dioxin-like PCBs and total PCBs. While the US FDA has not set a limit for PCBs in supplements, the Global Organization for EPA and DHA (GOED) has established a guideline allowing for no more than 3 picograms of dioxin-like PCBs per gram of fish oil. In 2012, samples from 35 fish oil supplements were tested for PCBs. Trace amounts of PCBs were found in all samples, and two samples exceeded the GOED's limit. Although trace amounts of PCBs contribute to overall PCB exposure, Consumerlab.com claims the amounts reported by tests it ordered on fish oil supplements are far below those found in a single typical serving of fish.

==== Spoilage ====
Peroxides can be produced when fish oil spoils. A study commissioned by the government of Norway concluded there would be some health concern related to the regular consumption of oxidized (rancid) fish/marine oils, particularly in regards to the gastrointestinal tract, but there is not enough data to determine the risk. The amount of spoilage and contamination in a supplement depends on the raw materials and processes of extraction, refining, concentration, encapsulation, storage and transportation. ConsumerLab.com reports in its review that it found spoilage in test reports it ordered on some fish oil supplement products.

=== Prescription fish oil-based medications ===
Fish oil itself is available as a prescription, but the majority of fish oil products available via prescription are derivatives of fish oil. Such products are described elsewhere in this article. These preparations, with the purpose of treating or preventing medical disorder, are only available with a doctor's prescription. In the US, such prescriptions undergo the same Food and Drug Administration (FDA) regulatory requirements as other prescription medications, including with regard to both efficacy and safety. Purity is also regulated by the FDA. The prescription fish oil derivative medicines differ from over-the-counter fish oil supplements. Prescription fish oil is considered a safe and effective option to reduce triglycerides. There are various prescription fish oil products that have been approved and permitted by the FDA for decreasing triglyceride levels. Prescription fish oil products having DHA work by raising LDL-C levels to reduce triglycerides, like fibrates. Heart experts advise that prescription fish oil helps in decreasing additional levels of blood fats. Prescription fish oils might only help when triglycerides reach a specific upper level. Prescription fish oil pills, capsules and tablets have more omega−3 fatty acids than those which are non-prescription. The FDA regularly monitors prescription fish oil for standards like purity and for quality and safety.

As of 2019, four fish oil-based prescription drugs have been approved in the United States for the treatment of hypertriglyceridemia, namely:

1. Epanova (omega-3-carboxylic acids) was approved on 23 April 2014. Clinical trial on mixed dyslipidaemia (hypertriglyceridemia with hypocholesterolemia) started in 2014 found that it has no medical benefits, and the clinical trial was called off on 13 January 2019. Although FDA-approved, Epanova is not available in any market.
2. Lovaza (omega-3-acid ethyl esters) was approved on 10 November 2004.
3. Omtryg (omega-3-acid ethyl esters) was approved on 23 April 2014.
4. Vascepa (ethyl eicosapentaenoic acid; icosapent ethyl) was approved on 26 July 2012. On 13 December 2019, the FDA also approved it as the first drug specifically "to reduce cardiovascular risk among patients with elevated triglyceride levels." Vascepa is not approved as a monotherapy for lowering TGs: it must be taken with a statin, per product labeling.

Some fish-oil products are approved for parenteral nutrition:

1. Omegaven, approved in July 2018, is indicated as a source of calories and fatty acids in children with parenteral nutrition-associated cholestasis (PNAC).
2. Smoflipid, approved in July 2016, is indicated in adults as a source of calories and essential fatty acids for parenteral nutrition when oral or enteral nutrition is not possible, insufficient, or contraindicated.

== Dangers ==
A 2013 review concluded that the potential for adverse events among older adults taking fish oil "appear mild–moderate at worst and are unlikely to be of clinical significance".

=== Maximum intake ===
The FDA recommends that consumers do not exceed more than 3 grams per day of EPA and DHA combined, with no more than 2 grams from a dietary supplement. This is not the same as 3000 mg of fish oil. A 1000 mg pill typically has only 300 mg of omega−3; 10 such pills would equal 3000 mg of omega−3. According to the European Food Safety Authority's (EFSA) Panel on Dietetic Products, Nutrition and Allergies, supplementation of 5 grams of EPA and DHA combined does not pose a safety concern for adults. A 1987 study found that healthy Greenlandic Inuit had an average intake of 5.7 grams of omega−3 EPA per day which had many effects including prolonged bleeding times, such as slower blood clotting.

==== Research ====
Two 2021 systematic reviews and meta-analyses concluded that more than 1 g/d marine omega−3 fatty acids is associated with an increased risk of atrial fibrillation.

=== Vitamins ===
The liver and liver products (such as cod liver oil) of fish and many animals (such as seals and whales) contain omega−3, but also the active form of vitamin A. At high levels, this form of the vitamin can be dangerous (Hypervitaminosis A).

=== Toxic pollutants ===
Consumers of oily fish should be aware of the potential presence of heavy metals and fat-soluble pollutants like PCBs and dioxins, which are known to accumulate up the food chain. After extensive review, researchers from Harvard's School of Public Health in the Journal of the American Medical Association (2006) reported that the benefits of fish intake generally far outweigh the potential risks.

Heat treatment of fats (fatty acid esters of glycerol) can form glycidol, glycidol fatty acid esters (GE), 2-Monochloropropane-1,3-diol fatty acid esters (2-MCPDE) and 3-monochloropropane-1,2-diol fatty acid esters (3-MCPDE), which contaminate marine oil supplements and fatty fish products.

Fish oil supplements came under scrutiny in 2006, when the Food Standards Agency in the UK and the Food Safety Authority of Ireland reported polychlorinated biphenyl (PCB) levels that exceeded the European Union maximum limits in several fish oil brands, which required temporary withdrawal of these brands. To address the concern over contaminated fish oil supplements, the International Fish Oil Standards (IFOS) Program, a third-party testing and accreditation program for fish oil products, was created by Nutrasource Diagnostics Inc. in Guelph, Ontario, Canada.

A March 2010 lawsuit filed by a California environmental group claimed that eight brands of fish oil supplements contained excessive levels of PCBs, including CVS/pharmacy, Nature Made, Rite Aid, GNC, Solgar, Twinlab, Now Health, Omega Protein and Pharmavite. The majority of these products were either cod liver or shark liver oils. Those participating in the lawsuit claim that because the liver is the major filtering and detoxifying organ, PCB content may be higher in liver-based oils than in fish oil produced from the processing of whole fish.

An analysis based on data from the Norwegian Women and Cancer Study (NOWAC) with regards to the dangers of persistent organic pollutants (POPs) in cod liver came to the conclusion that "in Norwegian women, fish liver consumption was not associated with an increased cancer risk in breast, uterus, or colon. In contrast, a decreased risk for total cancer was found."

Microalgae oil is a vegetarian alternative to fish oil. Supplements produced from microalgae oil provide a balance of omega−3 fatty acids similar to fish oil, with a lower risk of pollutant exposure.

== See also ==
- Algae
- Cod liver oil
- Docosahexaenoic acid
- Eicosapentaenoic acid
- Krill oil
- Lovaza
- Omega-3-acid ethyl esters
- Shark liver oil

== Sources ==
This article incorporates text from a free content work. Licensed under CC BY 4.0 (license statement/permission). Text taken from The State of World Fisheries and Aquaculture 2024, FAO.

== Notes ==
1. Omega−3 fish oil supplements have no standard doses and vary considerably by producers and producers' products, but salmon oil consistently has more DHA than EPA while other fish oils have more EPA than DHA. For example, one supplier, Trident Food's Pure Alaska salmon oil product label reports per serving DHA 220 mg and EPA 180 mg (total omega−3 = 600 mg), but their fish oil based on pollock has DHA 144 mg and EPA 356 mg (total omega−3 = 530 mg). Equivalent products from another producer, Fish Oils, Puritan's Pride, reports DHA 180 mg and EPA 150 mg for their salmon oil product (total omega−3 = 420 mg), but DHA 204 mg and EPA 318 mg for fish oil derived from anchovy, sardine, and mackerel (total omega−3 = 600 mg). For information and comparison purposes only, no endorsements are implied.
2. Plant-based omega−3s are rich in ALA but completely lack EPA and DHA, so vegetarians and vegans seeking non-fish sources turn to more expensive algae derived oils. There is generally a pattern of more DHA than EPA in most of these products. For example, Nordic Naturals reports per serving DHA 390 mg and EPA 195 mg (total omega−3 = 715 mg), Calgee reports DHA 300 mg and EPA 150 mg (total omega−3 = 550 mg) and so on, but iwi Life reports DHA 100 mg and EPA 150 mg (total omega−3 = 252 mg). For information and comparison purposes only, no endorsements are implied.
3. Trident Seafoods Pure Alaska Alaskan Omega-3 625 mg
4. Trident Seafoods Pure Alaska Omega Wild Alaskan Salmon Oil 1000 mg Certificate of Analysis
