= Jeffrey Boutelle =

American businessman

Jeff Boutelle
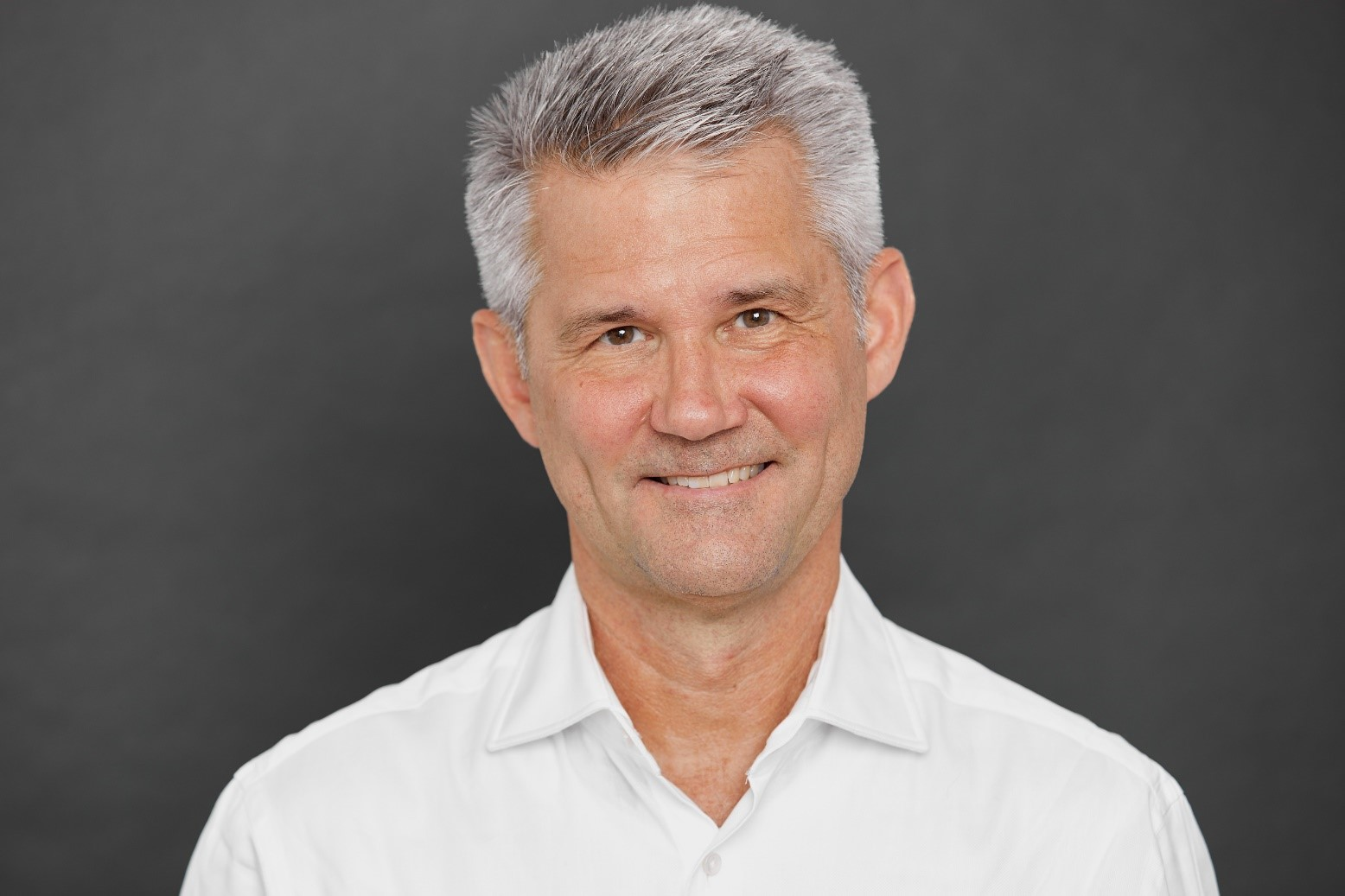
- Born: Jeffrey C. Boutelle
- Education: Bowling Green State University; Duke University
- Known for: Beech-Nut Nutrition Co., Pharmavite, Procter & Gamble Co., Abbott Nutrition, Nestlé

Jeffrey C. Boutelle (Jeff Boutelle), is an American entrepreneur and business executive. Boutelle became chief executive officer of Pharmavite LLC on August 7, 2017.

== Early life and education ==
Boutelle received a Bachelor of Science in Business Administration from Bowling Green State University in 1985. He then earned his MBA from Duke University’s Fuqua School of Business in 1992.

== Career ==
After business school, Boutelle joined P&G as a Brand Manager.

From 1999 to 2003, he was Vice President of Marketing for Nestlé USA, where he led the Stouffer's advertisement campaign.

Boutelle worked as a Marketing Principal at Henry Rak Consulting Partners from 2004 to 2005. He then served as Senior Vice President for Marketing and Communications with the University Hospitals of Cleveland from 2005 to 2007.

Boutelle joined Abbott in 2007 as a Vice President and General Manager of its Pediatric Nutrition division. He was later promoted to Division Vice President of Europe, the Middle East, and Africa.

=== Beech-Nut Nutrition (2012–2017) ===
In 2012, Boutelle departed Abbott to become CEO and President of Beech-Nut. Under his leadership, he stabilized the company by significantly improving gross margin, launching the “Just Naturals” brand, and expanding Beech-Nut’s “Real Food for Babies” platform.

=== Pharmavite (since 2017) ===
On August 7, 2017, Boutelle took over as CEO of Pharmavite. In his time at Pharmavite, Boutelle has led the expansion of the organization’s portfolio through the acquisition of Uqora in 2021, the launch of hyper-personalized vitamin brand Nurish by Nature Made in 2020, and the launch of scientifically-designed Nature Made Wellblends in 2022.

Pharmavite broke ground on a new $200M production facility in New Albany, Ohio, in 2023. It is expected to begin production in 2024 and will be the site of Pharmavite’s Gummy Center of Excellence.
