= Crystal Geyser Water Company =

Bottled sparkling water company

- Industry: Beverage, Bottled water
- Founded: 1977; 49 years ago
- Headquarters: Calistoga, California
- Area served: Worldwide
- Products: Sparkling water, ready-to-drink teas
- Parent: Otsuka Holdings
- Website: www.crystalgeyser.com

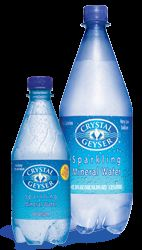
Crystal Geyser Water Company products

Crystal Geyser Water Company, or just Crystal Geyser, is a private company founded in 1977 in Calistoga, California which produces bottled sparkling water based on mineral water and spring water sources at their original facility in Calistoga. Crystal Geyser is owned by the Japanese company Otsuka Holdings.

== About ==
Besides sparkling water drinks, the company also produces ready-to-drink teas called Tejava in Bakersfield, California. In 1990 Crystal Geyser was acquired by Otsuka Pharmaceutical's parent company Otsuka Holdings Co. Ltd. In 2014, the company had plans to bottle water from an aquifer in Mount Shasta, California, but many local residents criticized the plan.

In August 2019, Siskiyou Superior Court dismissed a lawsuit brought by an environmental group and Native American tribe claiming the presence of their plant in the area would negatively impact the environment.

=== Water sources ===
Crystal Geyser Water Company produces sparkling mineral water and sparkling spring water out of their Calistoga facility. Mineral water and spring water are both from geologically and physically protected underground water sources. Mineral water is pumped from the underground sources and naturally contains at least 250 parts per million (ppm) total dissolved solids (TDS). Spring water reaches the surface without aid and is only considered mineral water if it reaches 250 ppm TDS.

== Confusion with CG Roxane ==
CG Roxane, which produces bottled waters with "Crystal Geyser Alpine Spring Water" branding printed on the bottles, is a different legal entity than the Crystal Geyser Water Company. Crystal Geyser Water Company and CG Roxane operate independent of each other, but are affiliates of the same Japanese company, Otsuka Pharmaceutical Co. Otsuka Pharmaceutical Co. owns 49% of Alma S.A., which is the parent company of CG Roxane.

CG Roxane was established in 1990, and only produces flat water under the Crystal Geyser Alpine Spring Water brand throughout the United States.

CG Roxane spring water is produced through a joint venture with Societe Roxane of France which is known as Crystal Geyser Roxane or just C G Roxane.

CG Roxane has a bottling plant in Weed, California, ten miles north-northwest of Mt. Shasta. Crystal Geyser Roxane draws water from an aquifer to the east of Mount Whitney with its plant located at Olancha, California, where it bottles, sells and exports water for Japanese domestic consumption. The company also supplies American retail outlets with their branded water, including Trader Joe's Natural Mountain Spring Water. CG Roxane also has a bottling plant in Benton, TN.
