= Rejoyn =

Digital therapeutic smartphone app

Rejoyn is a prescription-only digital therapeutic smartphone app approved by the US FDA for the treatment of major depressive disorder (MDD) in adults ages 22 and up. It is prescribed in conjunction with standard antidepressant medication and professional guidance and support.

Rejoyn was developed by Click Therapeutics and Otsuka America Pharmaceutical Inc., and gained FDA clearance as a "medical device" on March 30th, 2024. The smartphone app helps patients with depression using exercises based on cognitive behavioral therapy (CBT) along with timed notifications to keep the patient engaged and in treatment. Randomized controlled trials showed that the Rejoyn app was more effective at relieving depression symptoms compared to a "sham app", a placebo app that required similar effort but was not intended to be helpful. Dr. John Torous, MD, MBI,^{[a]} a psychiatrist at the Beth Israel Deaconess Medical Center in Boston, said that the app seems to pose minimal risks, and is an important step forward in unlocking the power of smartphones in treating psychiatric disorders.

Some experts have signaled that the claims should be taken with caution, since the app was "tested only in a narrow subset of patients." and its benefits are "not statistically significant," according to the study’s primary outcome."

== Notes ==
a^{1} MBI for Masters of Biomedical Informatics.
