= Otsuka Pharmaceutical =

Japanese pharmaceutical company

Otsuka Pharmaceutical Co., Ltd.
- Logo used since 2007

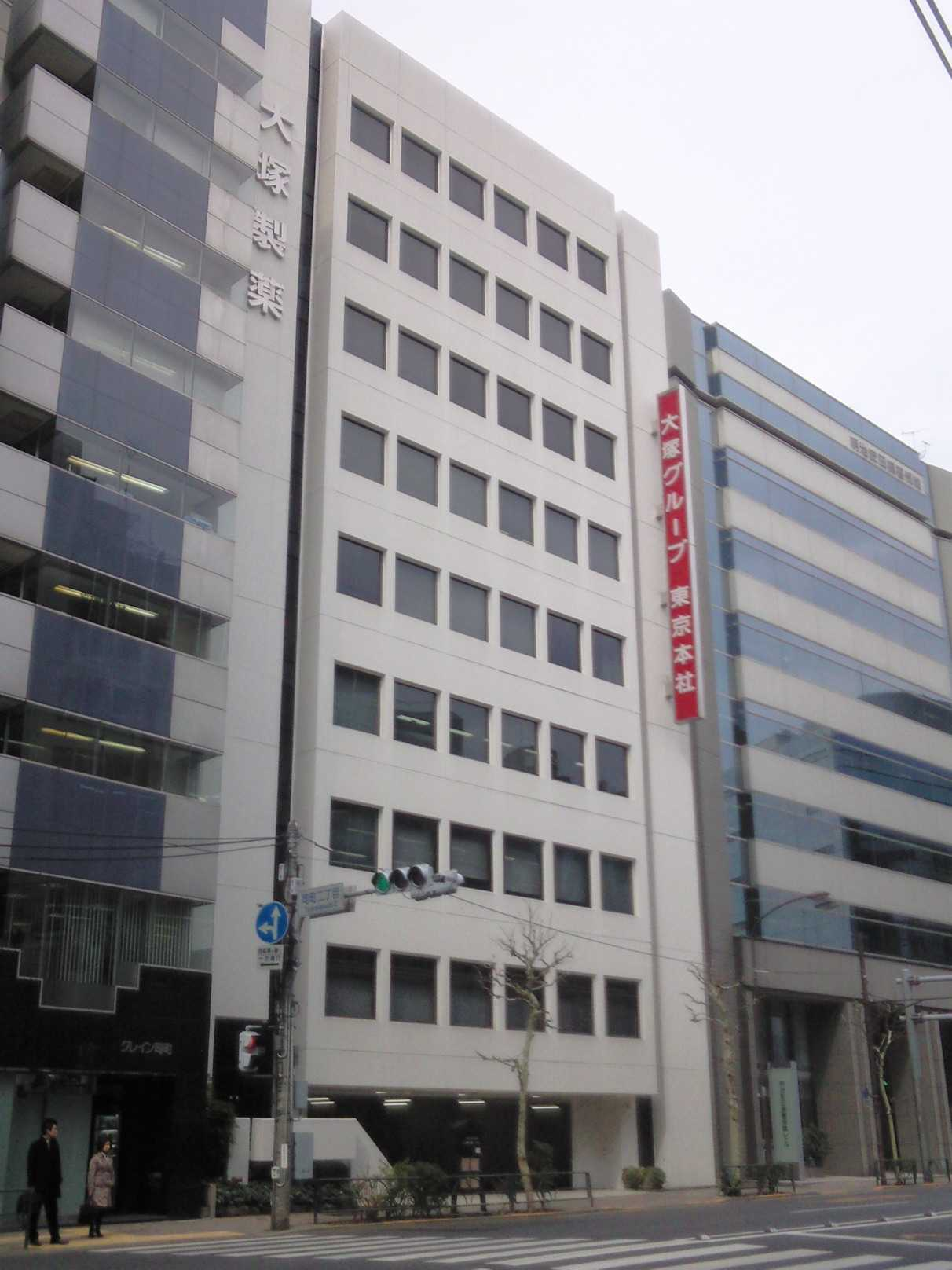
- Headquarters in Chiyoda, Tokyo
- Native name: 大塚製薬株式会社
- Romanized name: Ōtsuka Seiyaku Kabushiki-gaisha
- Type: Subsidiary KK
- Industry: Pharmaceutical
- Founded: 1921; 105 years ago (brand); August 10, 1964; 62 years ago (company)
- Founder: Busaburo Otsuka
- Headquarters: Tsukasamachi, Chiyoda, Tokyo, Japan
- Number of locations: 69
- Area served: Worldwide
- Key people: Tatsuo Higuchi (President)
- Revenue: ¥ 1.74 trillion (2022)
- Operating income: ¥ 150.32 billion (2022)
- Number of employees: 5,634 (2017)
- Parent: Otsuka Holdings
- Website: https://www.otsuka.com/jp/

Otsuka Pharmaceutical Co., Ltd. (大塚製薬株式会社, Ōtsuka Seiyaku Kabushiki-gaisha), abbreviated OPC, is a pharmaceutical company headquartered in Chiyoda, Tokyo. The company was established on August 10, 1964.

== History ==
OPC's parent company Otsuka Holdings Co. Ltd. joined the Tokyo Stock Exchange through an initial public offering (IPO) on December 15, 2010, at which time Otsuka Holdings was Japan's No. 2 drug maker by sales after industry leader Takeda Pharmaceutical Company. The IPO debuted at $2.4 billion, making it the largest for a pharmaceutical company up to that time.

=== Otsuka Pharmaceutical Co. Ltd Holdings ===
In 1955, the company started a football club called "Otsuka Pharmaceutical SC." In 2005 the name changed to Tokushima Vortis. The club is based in Naruto.

In 1988, Otsuka acquired Pharmavite, the California-based manufacturer of Nature Made, MegaFood, and other brands of vitamins and nutritional supplements.

In 2008, Otsuka Pharmaceutical Co. acquired 49% of Alma S.A., which is the parent company of CG Roxane.

In early 2012, Otsuka announced it would focus its "future operations on CNS disorders and oncology". This decision necessitated a revision in the terms of an agreement with UCB to end collaboration on immunology products while continuing collaboration in the CNS area.

In March 2017, the company agreed to acquire Neurovance, Inc. for $250 million, gaining the firm's Phase III-ready ADHD drug centanafadine (previously EB-1020). Otsuka's subsidiary Otsuka America will pay $100 million upfront for Neurovance, plus up-to $150 million in development and approval milestones. As a result of the transaction, Neurovance will operate as an indirect, wholly owned subsidiary.

In late 2023, the company announced the acquisition of Mindset Pharma for $58.6 million.

In March 2026, Otsuka Pharmaceutical acquired Transcend Therapeutics and its drug candidate methylone (TSND-201).

=== Acquisition history ===
Otsuka Pharmaceutical Acquisitions
- Otsuka Pharmaceutical Co., Ltd
  - Ridge Vineyards (Acq 1986)
  - Crystal Geyser Water Company (Acq 1990)
  - Astex Pharmaceuticals (Merged 2011, Acq 2013)
    - Astex Therapeutics Limited
    - SuperGen, Inc
  - Avanir Pharmaceuticals (Acq 2014)
  - Daiya (Acq 2017)
  - ReCor Medical, Inc. (Acq 2019)
  - Otsuka America, Inc
    - Visterra (Acq 2019)
    - Neurovance, Inc (Acq 2017)
    - Mindset Pharma Inc (Acq 2023)
    - Jnana Therapeutics Inc. (Acq 2024)

== Products ==
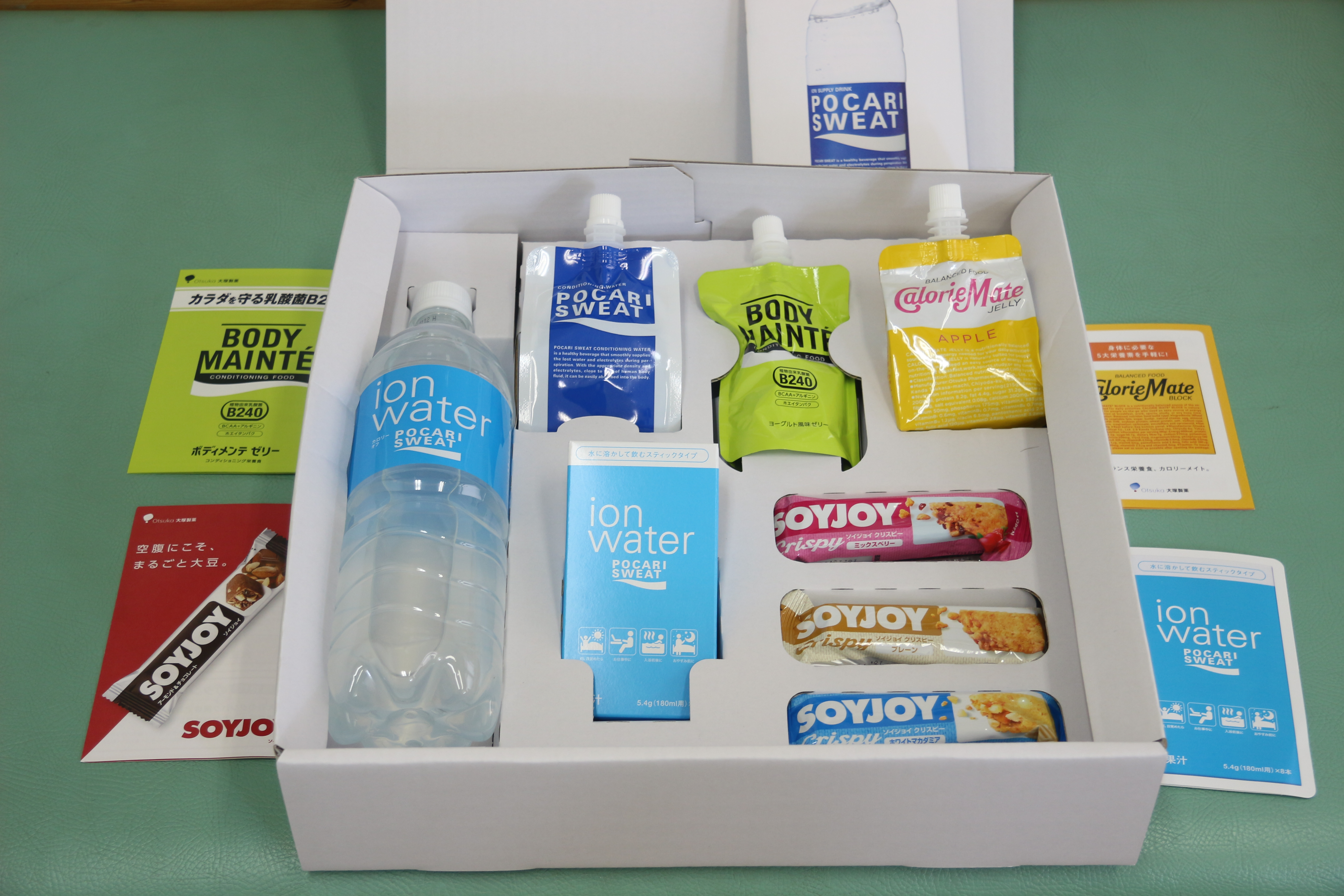
Products of Otsuka Pharmaceutical

=== Pharmaceutical ===
- Aripiprazole / Abilify
- Brexpiprazole / Rexulti
- Rejoyn

=== Nutraceutical ===
- Amino-Value
- CalorieMate
- Oronamin C
- Pocari Sweat
- SoyJoy

== Facilities ==
- Takasaki
- Fukuroi
- Saga
- Tokushima
- Itano
- Wajiki
