= Canadian Registration Number =

Pressure vessel/Boiler identification number

Canadian pressure laws, Acts, rules & regulations are enforced by provincial and territorial safety authorities. Unlike the United States where licensed professional engineers (PE) may stamp pressure equipment and pressure system/plant drawings in the non-nuclear sectors for construction, in Canada in general a professional engineer (P.ENG) who is not employed by a safety authority does not have that same right to stamp regulated pressure equipment or pressure system drawings for construction, and doing so may result in fines or professional license revocation, or jail time. The pressure safety design registration approval given by safety authority registrars in Canada is called a Canadian Registration Number (CRN). Pressure equipment must be registered in each province or territory where it will be used.

In addition to design registration, inspection after construction is also required in Canada and provincial and territorial safety authorities vary in their monopoly of the employment of such inspectors, depending also upon the pressure system type and scope, or the resources and scope of a particular safety authority.

Although NB-370 describes Canadian and U.S. jurisdictions, due to the significant difference between Canadian and U.S. pressure safety laws, rules and regulations, this Wikipedia article provides a supplement for Canada. Unlike the United States, there is currently no known Canadian government or safety authority resource, either federally or provincially, that consolidates the Canadian pressure regulation in the manner of this article.

Although the preceding makes mention of ASME, there exist other pressure equipment and piping standards and codes which are law in Canada such as American Petroleum Institute standards, and CSA standards, to name a few. Be sure to check with the chief inspector / regulator/ safety authority in the jurisdiction that pressure equipment is intended to be used before proceeding with procurement, build, fabrication or related construction activities.

== Safety Authorities and their Jurisdictions ==
=== Alberta Boiler Safety Authority ===
Alberta Boilers Safety Association is a not-for-profit fiscally independent politically directed regulator of pressure equipment for the province of Alberta. The following are some of the documents essential to understand before constructing or selling any non-exempt pressure equipment or systems in Alberta. These documents contain some information on applicability of regulations and exemptions. Alberta Boilers Safety Association makes its mandatory acts and regulations available to download for a fee, but viewable for free.

The structure of the regulatory documents in Alberta is significantly more complex than other regions of Canada. Here are links:

==== Exemptions ====
Pressure Equipment Exemption Order AR 56/2006,

Guide to PEEO AB-529

Pressure Equipment Safety Regulation AR 49/2006

AB-516 Pressure Equipment Safety Regulation (PESR) User Guide

Consult the act, regulations and codes section of the Alberta Boilers Safety Association website for more comprehensive and up-to-date information.

=== Technical Safety British Columbia ===
Since January 2020 Technical Safety BC (TSBC) has provided an online portal for making electronic submissions in an effort to eliminate the use of paper. This secure system works pretty well and can be found here: Main BC Safety authority design registration page.

==== Reciprocal registration ====
CSA B51 is clear about the acceptability of reciprocal approvals from other jurisdictions of first registration, and have provided forms to do this for quite some time. The following page provides all the details: Reciprocal

==== Boiler Safety Orders, Directives, and Information Bulletins ====
Directives are interpretation of a regulation or code. Compliance is mandatory.

==== Exemptions ====
Not unlike Quebec, Saskatchewan & Manitoba certain categories of fittings are exempt from registration in British Columbia. The link to this is found here.

=== Manitoba Office of the Fire Commission, Inspections and Technical Services ===
As a starting point consult the Manitoba C.C.S.M. c. S21- The Steam and Pressure Plants Act for useful information on pressure equipment exemptions and requirement(pressure vessel design course)s. Always consult the chief inspector of a jurisdiction.

The Manitoba office of the Fire Commission, Inspection and Technical Services site provides information, forms and useful contacts.

==== Reciprocal registration ====
Manitoba is the first to adopt the Premier's directive that interprovincial barriers to trade be reduced by acceptance of other provincial CRN registrations. See the directive here. At the present time the following is required to obtain Manitoba reciprocal approval :

changes take effect starting July 1, 2019. Only the following documents are required from you for a Reciprocal submission:

§ Completed Application form

§ Copy of Approval from another jurisdiction

§ Copy of drawings.

§ PLEASE SCAN all three requirements as one PDF document and send to QAsupport@gov.mb.ca

§ A prepayment is required. Please send in a cheque or call with your credit number referencing your “ CRN” to make payment.

==== Exemptions ====
Manitoba issued an exemption for certain categories of fittings that has very similar wording to the British Columbia exemption. Here is a link to the document.

=== New Brunswick Justice & Public Safety ===
As a starting point consult the New Brunswick Regulation 84-174 & the Boiler and Pressure Vessel Act for useful information on pressure equipment exemptions and requirements, pressure vessel engineering. Always consult the chief inspector of a jurisdiction.

New Brunswick Canadian Registration Numbers fitting registrations are issued with the help of ACI Central who assists with the seven provinces and territories that include: Newfoundland, Nunavut, Prince Edward Island, New Brunswick, Nova Scotia, North West Territories, Yukon. This small agency located on Prince Edward Island vastly simplifies what could be a terribly long and bureaucratic process of dealing with seven entities. ACI Central is not a delegated authority and does not issue or assign CRNs and has no authority to do so. ACI Central’s role is to perform design surveys/reviews of boilers, pressure vessels, pressure piping, and fittings, for both conventional and nuclear systems. They also manage the files and communicate with applicants, all on behalf of the chief inspectors of its member jurisdictions. Once an application file is complete and found to be satisfactory for the purposes of registration, ACI Central will then make recommendation to the chief inspectors of its member jurisdictions, to issue the CRN with their designators attached. The chief inspectors are the only authorities under law that can assign a CRN to the design of regulated pressure equipment, and it not delegated action outside of the chief inspector offices. Also, the Board of Directors for ACI Central is made up solely by the chief inspectors of the member jurisdictions, and as such, we perform audits regularly on ACI Central to ensure they are following proper procedures and protocols verifying design submissions and applications are complete and meet the quality standards expected by our respective legislations, codes and standards.

For boilers, pressure vessels and piping system design registration applications you may also contact the Justice and Public Safety site for the Government of New Brunswick provides additional information and useful contacts.

=== Newfoundland Labrador Boiler, Pressure Vessel and Compressed Gas ===
As a starting point consult the Newfoundland & Labrador Boiler and Pressure Vessels regulation for useful information on pressure equipment exemptions and requirements. Always consult the chief inspector of a jurisdiction.

Newfoundland & Labrador Canadian Registration Numbers for fittings are issued with the help of ACI Central who assists with the seven provinces and territories that include: Newfoundland, Nunavut, Prince Edward Island, New Brunswick, Nova Scotia, North West Territories, Yukon. This small agency located on Prince Edward Island vastly simplifies what could be a terribly long and bureaucratic process of dealing with seven entities. ACI Central is not a delegated authority and does not issue or assign CRNs and has no authority to do so. ACI Central’s role is to perform design surveys/reviews of boilers, pressure vessels, pressure piping, and fittings, for both conventional and nuclear systems. They also manage the files and communicate with applicants, all on behalf of the chief inspectors of its member jurisdictions. Once an application file is complete and found to be satisfactory for the purposes of registration, ACI Central will then make recommendation to the chief inspectors of its member jurisdictions, to issue the CRN with their designators attached. The chief inspectors are the only authorities under law that can assign a CRN to the design of regulated pressure equipment, and it not delegated action outside of the chief inspector offices. Also, the Board of Directors for ACI Central is made up solely by the chief inspectors of the member jurisdictions, and as such, we perform audits regularly on ACI Central to ensure they are following proper procedures and protocols verifying design submissions and applications are complete and meet the quality standards expected by our respective legislations, codes and standards.

For boiler, pressure vessel and pressure piping system design registration applications, directly contact the Newfoundland & Labrador government, Boilers, Pressure Vessels and Compresses Gas site provides further information and useful contacts.

=== North West Territories Government Public Works Services ===
As a starting point consult the Northwest Territories Boiler and Pressure Vessels Act R.S.N.W.T 1988, c.B-2 for useful information on pressure equipment exemptions and requirements. Always consult the chief inspector of a jurisdiction.

Northwest Territories Canadian Registration Numbers for fittings are issued with the help of ACI Central who assists with the seven provinces and territories that include: Newfoundland, Nunavut, Prince Edward Island, New Brunswick, Nova Scotia, North West Territories, Yukon. This small agency located on Prince Edward Island vastly simplifies what could be a terribly long and bureaucratic process of dealing with seven entities. ACI Central is not a delegated authority and does not issue or assign CRNs and has no authority to do so. ACI Central’s role is to perform design surveys/reviews of boilers, pressure vessels, pressure piping, and fittings, for both conventional and nuclear systems. They also manage the files and communicate with applicants, all on behalf of the chief inspectors of its member jurisdictions. Once an application file is complete and found to be satisfactory for the purposes of registration, ACI Central will then make recommendation to the chief inspectors of its member jurisdictions, to issue the CRN with their designators attached. The chief inspectors are the only authorities under law that can assign a CRN to the design of regulated pressure equipment, and it not delegated action outside of the chief inspector offices. Also, the Board of Directors for ACI Central is made up solely by the chief inspectors of the member jurisdictions, and as such, we perform audits regularly on ACI Central to ensure they are following proper procedures and protocols verifying design submissions and applications are complete and meet the quality standards expected by our respective legislations, codes and standards.

For boilers, pressure vessels, and pressure piping systems, you may also contact the Northwest Territories Government, Public Works Services, Boiler & Pressure Vessels site provides further information and useful contacts.

=== Nova Scotia Government Labour, Skills and Immigration ===
As a starting point consult the Nova Scotia Boiler and Pressure Equipment Regulations made under Section 49 of the Technical Safety Act S.N.S. 2008, c. 10 O.I.C. 2011-27 (January 18, 2011, effective April 1, 2011), N.S. Reg. 10/2011 for useful information on pressure equipment exemptions and requirements. Always consult the chief inspector of a jurisdiction.

Nova Scotia (NS) Canadian Registration Numbers for fittings are issued with the help of ACI Central who assists with the seven provinces and territories that include: Newfoundland, Nunavut, Prince Edward Island, New Brunswick, Nova Scotia, North West Territories, Yukon. This small agency located on Prince Edward Island vastly simplifies what could be a terribly long and bureaucratic process of dealing with seven entities. ACI Central is not a delegated authority and does not issue or assign CRNs and has no authority to do so. ACI Central’s role is to perform design surveys/reviews of boilers, pressure vessels, pressure piping, and fittings, for both conventional and nuclear systems. They also manage the files and communicate with applicants, all on behalf of the chief inspectors of its member jurisdictions. Once an application file is complete and found to be satisfactory for the purposes of registration, ACI Central will then make recommendation to the chief inspectors of its member jurisdictions, to issue the CRN with their designators attached. The chief inspectors are the only authorities under law that can assign a CRN to the design of regulated pressure equipment, and it not delegated action outside of the chief inspector offices. Also, the Board of Directors for ACI Central is made up solely by the chief inspectors of the member jurisdictions, and as such, we perform audits regularly on ACI Central to ensure they are following proper procedures and protocols verifying design submissions and applications are complete and meet the quality standards expected by our respective legislations, codes and standards.

For boilers, pressure vessels and piping system design registration applications, you may also directly contact the Nova Scotia (NS) government Labour, Skills and Immigration, Boiler and Pressure Vessels site provides further information.

=== Nunavut Government Community and Government Services Public Works and Services ===
As a starting point consult the Nunavut Consolidation of Boilers and Pressure Vessels Regulations R-006-93 for useful information on pressure equipment exemptions and requirements of Nunavut. Always consult the chief inspector of a jurisdiction. The act is found here. The Gazette publishes changes to the regulations.

Nunavut Canadian Registration Numbers for fittings are issued with the help of ACI Central who assists with the seven provinces and territories that include: Newfoundland, Nunavut, Prince Edward Island, New Brunswick, Nova Scotia, North West Territories, Yukon. This small agency located on Prince Edward Island vastly simplifies what could be a terribly long and bureaucratic process of dealing with seven entities. ACI Central is not a delegated authority and does not issue or assign CRNs and has no authority to do so. ACI Central’s role is to perform design surveys/reviews of boilers, pressure vessels, pressure piping, and fittings, for both conventional and nuclear systems. They also manage the files and communicate with applicants, all on behalf of the chief inspectors of its member jurisdictions. Once an application file is complete and found to be satisfactory for the purposes of registration, ACI Central will then make recommendation to the chief inspectors of its member jurisdictions, to issue the CRN with their designators attached. The chief inspectors are the only authorities under law that can assign a CRN to the design of regulated pressure equipment, and it not delegated action outside of the chief inspector offices. Also, the Board of Directors for ACI Central is made up solely by the chief inspectors of the member jurisdictions, and as such, we perform audits regularly on ACI Central to ensure they are following proper procedures and protocols verifying design submissions and applications are complete and meet the quality standards expected by our respective legislations, codes and standards.

For boilers, pressure vessels and piping system registration applications you may also contact the Nunavut government, Community and Government Services, Boiler Safety division, Public Works and Services for more information.

=== Technical Standards and Safety Authority ===
The Technical Standard and Safety Association (TSSA) is a not-for-profit fiscally independent from government. TSSA is the regulator of pressure equipment for the province of Ontario, its board of directors is appointed by the Minister of Government and Consumer Services. The following are some of the documents essential to understand before constructing or selling any non-exempt pressure equipment or systems in Ontario. These documents contain some information on applicability of regulations and exemptions.

Act: Technical Standards & Safety Act, 2000

Regulation: O.REG.220 & summary of key changes made to the regulation by TSSA's Director

Revocation of Agricultural exemptions from CRN regime in Ontario: Effective 1 July 2021

TSSA code adoption document for Ontario: June 28, 2018

Beginning January 1, 2020 design reviews conducted by provinces and territories in Canada will be mutually recognized by those jurisdictions participating in the Reconciliation Agreement for the Canadian Registration Number (CRN) for Pressure Equipment. With a single design review being conducted, the system is becoming more streamlined and efficient.

Participating jurisdictions include British Columbia, Manitoba, Northwest Territories, Nova Scotia, Ontario, Prince Edward Island, Québec, Saskatchewan, and Yukon. For more information, please contact customerservice@tssa.org.

Consult the legislation and regulation section of the TSSA.org website for more comprehensive and up-to-date information.

==== Reciprocal registration ====
CSA B51 is clear about the acceptability of reciprocal approvals from other jurisdictions of first registration, and have adopted reciprocal approvals since January 2020.

=== Prince Edward Island Government, Agriculture and Land ===
As a starting point consult the Prince Edward Island Boiler and Pressure Vessels Act R.S.N.W.T 1988, c.B-2 for useful information on pressure equipment exemptions and requirements. Always consult the chief inspector of a jurisdiction.

Prince Edward Island Canadian Registration Numbers for fittings are issued with the help of ACI Central who assists with the seven provinces and territories that include: Newfoundland, Nunavut, Prince Edward Island, New Brunswick, Nova Scotia, North West Territories, Yukon. This small agency located on Prince Edward Island vastly simplifies what could be a terribly long and bureaucratic process of dealing with seven entities. ACI Central is not a delegated authority and does not issue or assign CRNs and has no authority to do so. ACI Central’s role is to perform design surveys/reviews of boilers, pressure vessels, pressure piping, and fittings, for both conventional and nuclear systems. They also manage the files and communicate with applicants, all on behalf of the chief inspectors of its member jurisdictions. Once an application file is complete and found to be satisfactory for the purposes of registration, ACI Central will then make recommendation to the chief inspectors of its member jurisdictions, to issue the CRN with their designators attached. The chief inspectors are the only authorities under law that can assign a CRN to the design of regulated pressure equipment, and it not delegated action outside of the chief inspector offices. Also, the Board of Directors for ACI Central is made up solely by the chief inspectors of the member jurisdictions, and as such, we perform audits regularly on ACI Central to ensure they are following proper procedures and protocols verifying design submissions and applications are complete and meet the quality standards expected by our respective legislations, codes and standards.

For boiler and pressure vessel registrations and piping system registration applications, you may also directly contact the Prince Edward Island Government, Communities, Land & Environment section, Installation / Alternation Permit for and Land/installation-alteration-permit-boilers-or-pressure Boiler & Pressure Vessels page provides further information.

=== Régie du bâtiment (RBQ) ===
As a starting point consult the Quebec A-20.01 Act respecting pressure vessels and the Regulation Respecting Pressure Vessels for useful information on pressure equipment exemptions and requirements. Always consult the chief inspector of a jurisdiction.

Under the responsibility of the Ministre du Travail, de l’Emploi et de la Solidarité social, the Régie du bâtiment – (RBQ) is responsible for the entire territory of the province of Quebec. The RBQ has the status of a “body other than budget-funded body”. Thus, it finances its expenses directly from the sources of independent revenue. However, the RBQ remains subject to the Civil Service Act and liable to the government budgetary management framework. The RBQ's head office is in Montreal. The following pertains to this jurisdiction.

==== Exemptions ====
Recently RBQ created exemptions for the registration of categories of fittings which are detailed here RBQ ACT.

==== Reciprocal registration ====
CSA B51 is clear about the acceptability of reciprocal approvals from other jurisdictions of first registration, and RBQ has adopted reciprocal approvals since January 2020.

=== Saskatchewan ===
As a starting point consult the Saskatchewan Boiler & Pressure Vessel Act, 1999 for useful information on pressure equipment exemptions and requirements. Always consult the chief inspector of a jurisdiction.

The Technical Safety Authority of Saskatchewan Boiler and Pressure vessel site provides information, forms and useful contacts, and exemptions.

==== Exemptions ====
Not unlike Quebec, BC and Manitoba certain categories of fittings are exempt from registration in Saskatchewan.

==== Reciprocal registration ====
CSA B51 is clear about the acceptability of reciprocal approvals from other jurisdictions of first registration, and Saskatchewan has adopted reciprocal approvals since January 2020.

=== Yukon ===
As a starting point consult the Yukon Boiler and Pressure Vessels Act 2002 for useful information on pressure equipment exemptions and requirements. Always consult the chief inspector of a jurisdiction.

Yukon Canadian Registration Numbers for fittings are issued with the help of ACI Central who assists with the seven provinces and territories that include: Newfoundland, Nunavut, Prince Edward Island, New Brunswick, Nova Scotia, North West Territories, Yukon. This small agency located on Prince Edward Island vastly simplifies what could be a terribly long and bureaucratic process of dealing with seven entities. ACI Central is not a delegated authority and does not issue or assign CRNs and has no authority to do so. ACI Central’s role is to perform design surveys/reviews of boilers, pressure vessels, pressure piping, and fittings, for both conventional and nuclear systems. They also manage the files and communicate with applicants, all on behalf of the chief inspectors of its member jurisdictions. Once an application file is complete and found to be satisfactory for the purposes of registration, ACI Central will then make recommendation to the chief inspectors of its member jurisdictions, to issue the CRN with their designators attached. The chief inspectors are the only authorities under law that can assign a CRN to the design of regulated pressure equipment, and it not delegated action outside of the chief inspector offices. Also, the Board of Directors for ACI Central is made up solely by the chief inspectors of the member jurisdictions, and as such, we perform audits regularly on ACI Central to ensure they are following proper procedures and protocols verifying design submissions and applications are complete and meet the quality standards expected by our respective legislations, codes and standards.

For boilers, pressure vessels and pressure piping applications, contact the Government of Yukon, Department of Community Services, Mechanical Inspections site provides further information and contacts.
