= U.S. Climate Reference Network =

Climatological research organization

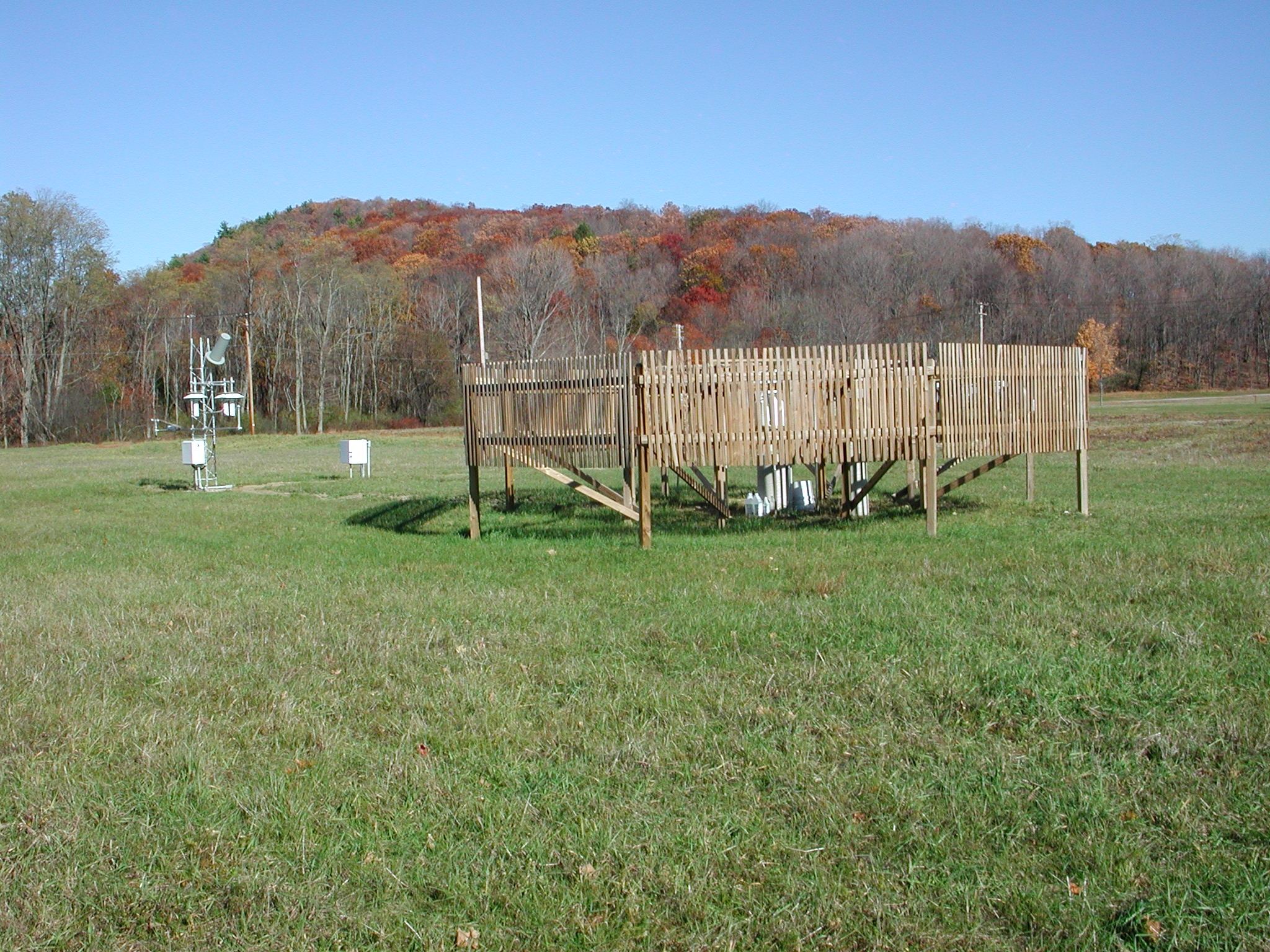
USCRN station. Millbrook, New York

The US Climate Reference Network (USCRN) is a network of climate stations developed and maintained by the National Oceanic and Atmospheric Administration (NOAA). The purpose of the USCRN is to maintain a sustainable high quality network which will detect, with high confidence, signals of climate change in the US. As of 2023 it consists of 137 commissioned stations located in the Contiguous United States, Alaska and Hawaii.

== Purpose ==
The goal of the USCRN is to provide free of charge long-term high-quality observations of surface air temperature, precipitation, and other climate indicators to the general public. The new observations can be coupled to past long-term observations for the detection and attribution of present and future climate change. It provides the United States with a reference network that meets the requirements of the Global Climate Observing System.

== Background ==
In 1997 the World Climate Research Programme convened a meeting to determine the state of the art of climate research around the world. One of the principle conclusions of this meeting was that the global capacity to measure major climate variables such as temperature, rainfall, wind speed and direction was inadequate to inform efforts to confront the emerging issue of climate change. This warning was reinforced by America’s National Research Council in their 1999 report that called for a national effort to create decision support systems that could support these efforts.

The US response to this challenge was organized by the NOAA. The result was the USCRN that collects major climate variables, which are then assembled by the National Centers for Environmental Information into a database and made available, free of charge, to the public.

The first prototype of a USCRN station was constructed in North Carolina in the year 2000. The USCRN was commissioned January 2004, and the contiguous United States (CONUS) network of 114 stations was completed in 2008.

== The Network ==
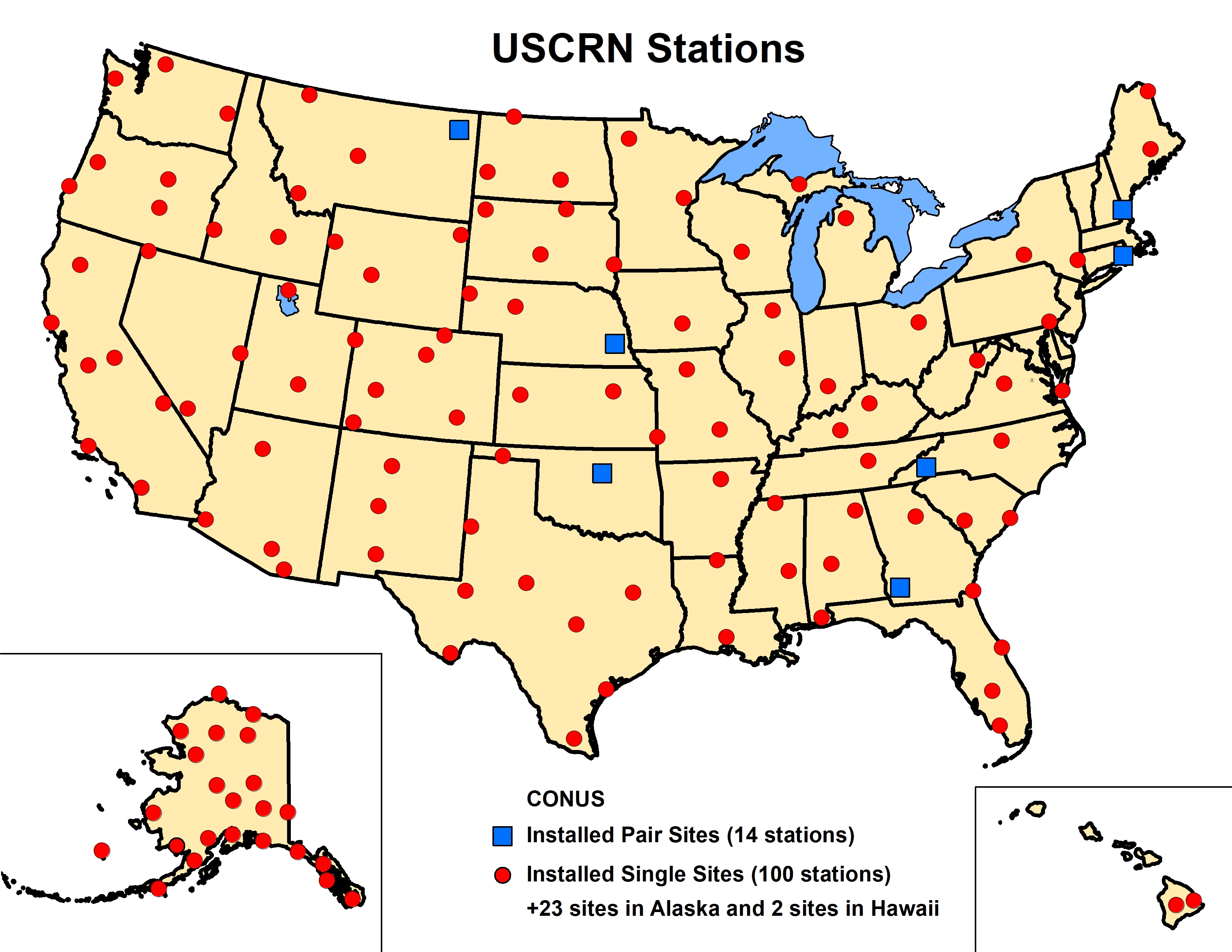

As of 2023 the USCRN consists of 114 stations in the contiguous US, 2 stations in Hawaii, and 21 stations in Alaska.

This map shows the 2023 locations of all USCRN stations.

The USCRN is operated and maintained by the Air Resources Laboratory, a division of NOAA Research. The National Centers for Environmental Information maintains and distributes the USCRN database of observations and derived climate products.

== Stations ==
Each station is positioned in a pristine site which is representative of the climate of the region and expected to remain free from development over coming decades, in order to avoid, for example, possible urban microclimate interference.

Each station may include the following sensors:

- Air temperature
- Surface temperature
- Precipitation
- Soil moisture
- Solar radiation
- Wind speed
- Relative humidity

== The data base ==
Collecting readings from the USCRN stations, organizing them into a database, and making them available to the public is managed by the National Centers for Environmental Information, a component of the NOAA.

An example of the reports available is this chart that shows the average surface temperature anomaly for the contiguous US for the period January 2005 to October 2023.

In this context anomaly is defined as a deviation from a trend established from historical observations of temperature. For this chart, the trend is expressed as zero degrees Fahrenheit (0˚F) on the left vertical axis and zero degrees Celsius (0˚C) on the right vertical axis. Each point on the graph represents the extent of the deviation of each temperature reading from this calculated trend.

USCRN average temperature anomaly for contiguous United States 2005-2023

== Using the USCRN to extend the history of high-quality weather observations ==
The USCRN provides high-quality observations of temperature and other climate indicators dating from its commissioning in 2004 to the present. In addition, it has been used as a reference to validate other weather stations in the US and so extend the history of this network of high-quality weather observations back into the past as far as 1894 when the official US weather record began.

=== The cooperative observer network ===
The Cooperative Observer Program (COOP) is a nationwide collection of about 8,500 volunteers in the contiguous United States (CONUS) who record and report daily observations of weather variables. It was established by the US Congress in 1890 and is now part of the National Weather Service (NWS). Observations are usually limited to maximum and minimum temperatures and precipitation but can include other meteorological data.

=== The US historical climatology network ===
The US Historical Climatological Network (USHCN) was created in the mid 1980’s. This network is a group of 1,218 COOP stations that spatially represent CONUS, have a long history of continuous temperature records, which could date back to the COOP’s inception, and which are located in rural or small town locations so that their readings would tend to produce an estimate of long-term climate changes that would be as unbiased as possible.

Since its inception, the climatic observations from the USHCN, particularly temperature, have been affected by systemic inhomogeneities (non-climate effects) during the more than 100 years of the USHCN’s stations’ existence. These include time of observation changes at one station over time; different times of observation between stations; instrument changes, for example converting from a liquid-in-glass temperature instrument to an RTD minimum-maximum sensor; station location changes; and changes in urban development surrounding the station.

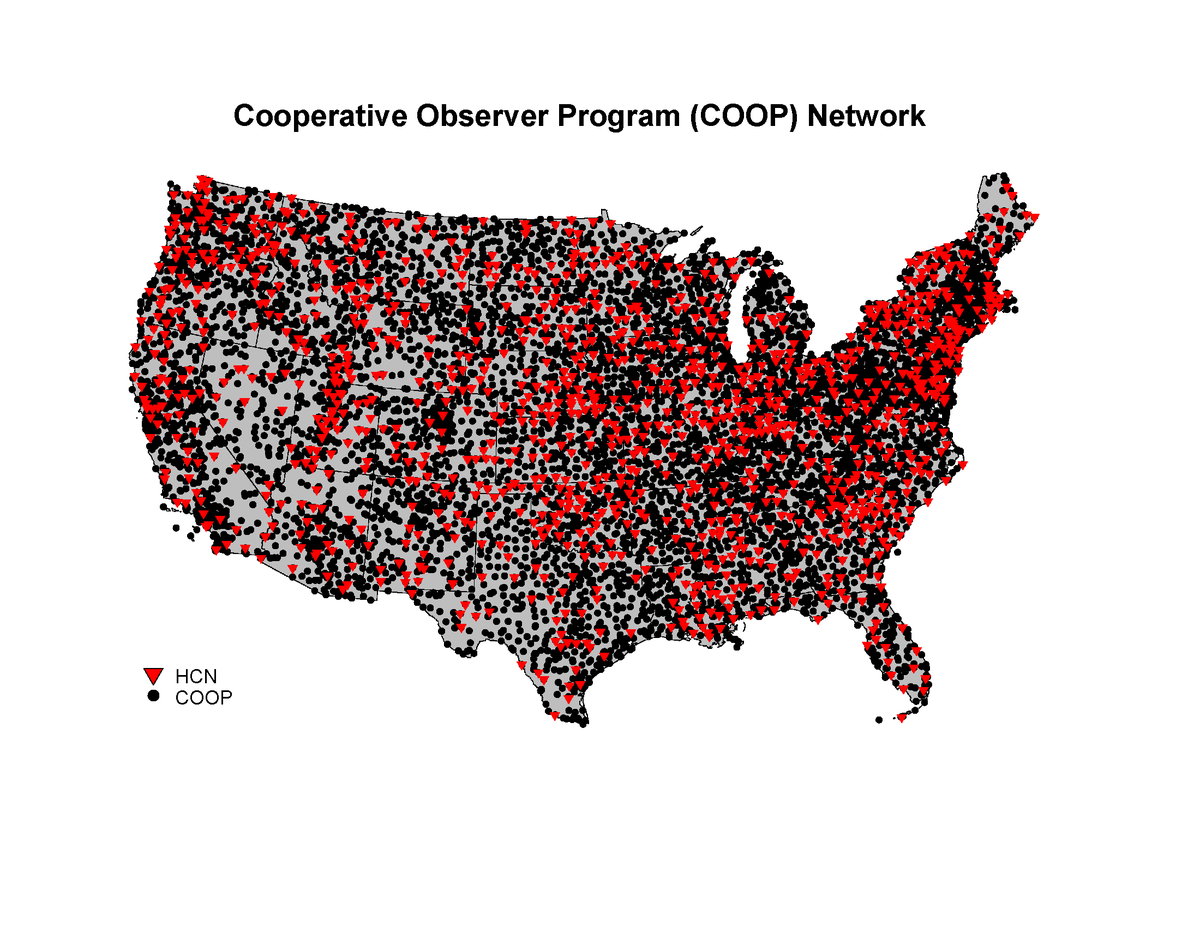

The NOAA has sponsored projects to remove these inhomogeneities to eliminate any remaining non-climate related biases. The most recent result of these improvements, labeled Version 2, was first available in 2014 and maintains the strength of the original version of USHCN while providing more accurate and reliable climatic measures around CONUS

The USHCN stations remain a subset of the COOP. The map shows their location along with the locations of the rest of the COOP stations.

=== Using the USCRN to evaluate USHCN history ===
By design the USCRN has no biases and is therefore defined as homogenous. It can therefore be used as a reference to assess those adjustments made to the USHCN. In 2016 statistical methods were used to compare USHCN with USCRN for CONUS for the overlapping time period between January 2004 and August 2015. This study found that over the period of the analysis the adjustments to the USHCN made its trends more similar to those of proximate USCRN stations.

In 2014 the National Center for Environmental Information (NCEI) announced a transition of all climate databases to an improved database labeled ClimDiv. This new database includes several more improvements from its previous version. The ClimDiv database now provides long-term and spatially complete values for temperature, precipitation, and other climate indices from 1895 to the present for CONUS.

An example of information available from the ClimDiv is this National Temperature Index time series that shows a comparison between the USHCN component of the larger CimDiv database and the USCRN database during the period when both time series overlap, in this example from Jan 2005 to Jan 2025.

This chart shows how the USCRN, as its name implies, becomes a reference, a standard, against which the USHCN can be evaluated.

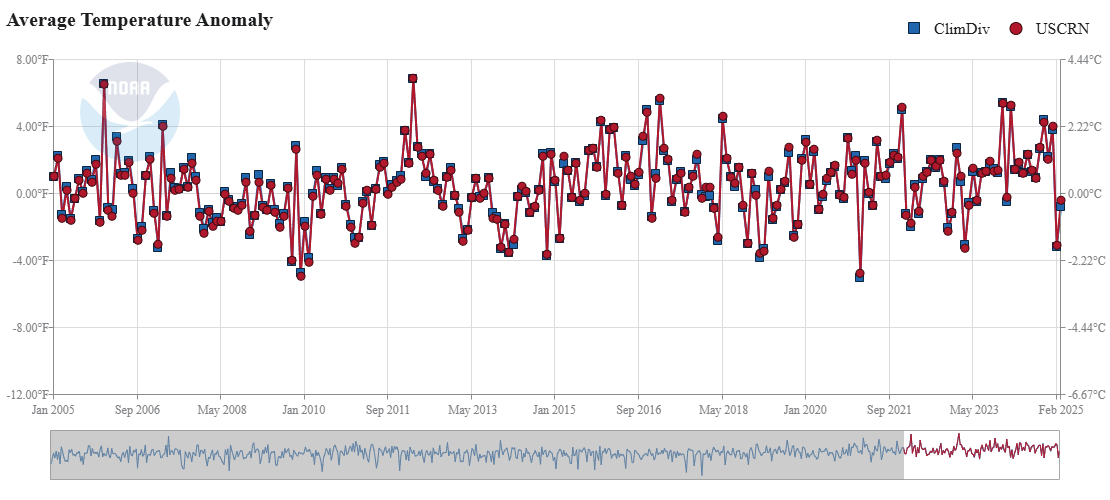

The USHCN time series, part of ClimDiv history from 1895 to Jan 2025, is shown in the shaded time series below the chart above.

There are small tabs on this shaded chart. By manipulating these tabs, it is possible to show any time range, and therefore any historical CONUS USHCN temperature time series, during the period 1895 to the present. For example, the chart below, produced by moving the time tab all the way to the left to the Aug 1895 date, shows the average temperature anomaly for CONUS from 1895 to January 2025.

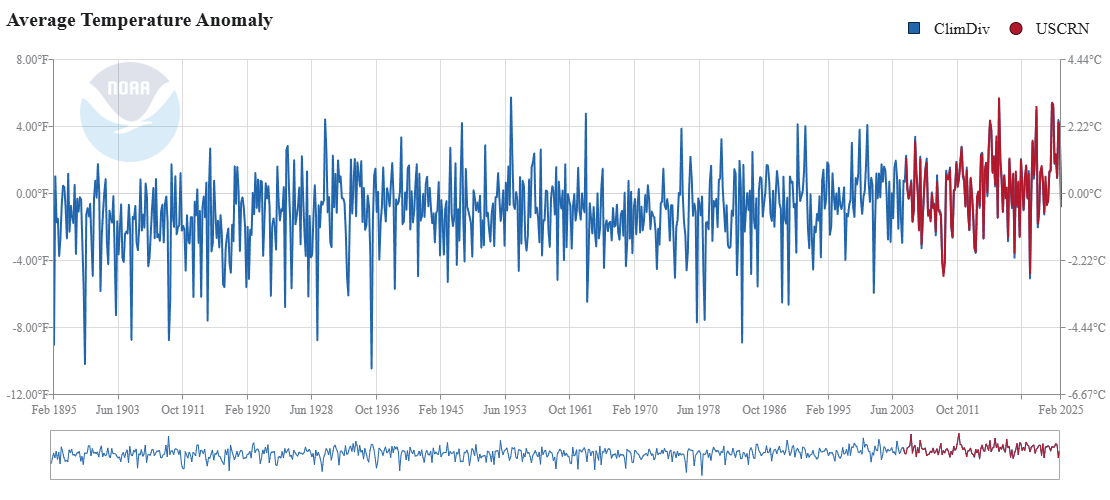
