= Congress Rental Network =

Congress Rental Network (CRN)
- Company type: Trade network
- Industry: Conference
- Founded: 1990; 36 years ago
- Founder: G.J. Beuzel
- Headquarters: Nieuw-Vennep, The Netherlands
- Area served: Worldwide
- Products: Conference Systems, simultaneous interpretation services, trained technicians in conference devices
- Services: Connect conference hosts and providers to worldwide resources to managed conference equipment
- Website: congressrentalnetwork.com

Congress Rental Network (CRN) is a worldwide network of conference technology specialists. As an organization, it aims to provide technical solutions, in regards to conference, congress and audiovisual requirements for meetings and events through member companies in each country.

The network is linked to the conference equipment manufactured by German conglomerate Bosch. Through local providers, that are part of the network, the network provides resources, equipment support, and simultaneous translation services for large meetings and conferences.

== History ==
CRN was created in 1990 with the first members to joining in, under the guidance of Philips (at that time - now Bosch), were located in Denmark, the Netherlands and Italy.

It has been associated with G20's meetings and with the International Association of Conference Interpreters (AIIC).
