= CRN International =

- Industry: Radio marketing
- Founded: 1973; 53 years ago
- Headquarters: Hamden, Connecticut, United States
- Website: crnradio.com

CRN International is an American radio marketing and promotions company. CRN was founded by Barry Berman and S. Richard Kalt in 1973.

The company clients have included: Microsoft, Kraft, Chrysler, Johnson & Johnson, Hershey Foods, The Campbell Soup Company, Apple, The Navy, Unilever, PepsiCo and Nextel among others.

In 2009, CRN received MediaWeek Magazine’s Award for the Media Plan of the Year for Local Television and Cable. CRN was included on the Inc Magazine list of 500 fastest-growing private companies in 1985 and 1986.

The roots of CRN International came from a company Berman founded, “Connecticut Radio Network,” which provided news, sports, weather and special programming for 55 Connecticut radio stations. That company produced an independent ski report, New England Ski Watch for only Connecticut stations. Its sponsor, Maxwell House Coffee, funded CRN’s expansion to broadcast local ski reports around the country. CRN ended its daily news service for Connecticut radio stations on June 9, 2017.

By 1981, CRN International was producing programming and promotions in 45 states. By 2000 CRN was creating campaigns that were broadcast in all 50 states, plus Canada and Europe.

In 2016, the company announced a new podcast division called Collisions.

CRN International is headquartered in Hamden, Connecticut and has offices in New York City, Detroit, Los Angeles, Seattle, Minnesota, and Hershey.
