= Council for Responsible Nutrition =

US trade association and lobbying group

- Formation: Tax-exempt since October 1973; 52 years ago
- Type: 501(c)(6)
- Headquarters: Washington, DC
- Revenue: 7,435,390 USD (2024)
- Expenses: 7,184,167 USD (2024)
- Website: crnusa.org

The Council for Responsible Nutrition (CRN) is a Washington D.C.–based trade association and lobbying group representing more than 180 companies that manufacture dietary ingredients and supplements, or supply services to those suppliers and manufacturers. CRN's current president and CEO is Steve M. Mister.

== History ==
The Council for Responsible Nutrition was established in 1973 in Washington, D.C.

== Membership ==
CRN represents more than 180 companies that manufacture dietary ingredients and/or dietary supplements, or supply services to those suppliers and manufacturers. CRN’s member companies produce a large portion of the dietary supplements marketed in the United States and globally. Its member companies manufacture popular national brands as well as the store brands marketed by major supermarkets, drug stores and discount chains. These products also include those marketed through natural food stores and mainstream direct selling companies.

CRN member companies are expected to comply with a host of federal and state regulations governing dietary supplements in the areas of manufacturing, marketing, quality control and safety. Its supplier and manufacturer member companies also agree to adhere to additional voluntary guidelines as well as to CRN’s Code of Ethics.

== Activities ==
CRN sponsors two annual events. The Conference: CRN’s Annual Symposium for the Dietary Supplement Industry, is an event for the dietary supplement industry, and The Workshop: CRN’s Day of Science is an event for scientists interested in nutrition and dietary supplement scientific research.

In February 2019 Scott Gottlieb said that the U.S. Food and Drug Administration needed stronger powers over health claims for food supplements and the FDA warned a dozen companies to stop claiming their products can cure diseases. The Council opposed any suggestion that the sector needed stronger regulation.

== Affiliate organizations ==
CRN has two affiliate organizations. The CRN Foundation is a 501(c)(3) organization, representing the dietary supplement industry, whose mandate is to provide consumers with information about responsible use of dietary supplements, and to provide researchers and healthcare practitioners with education on the proper role of supplements in a healthy lifestyle. CRN-I is an international arm of the CRN whose mission is to provide science-based information to regulators, health care professionals, and the media, particularly those outside the United States, supporting the safety and benefit of dietary ingredients and supplements, and to promote sound nutrition and food safety policies well-grounded in science.
