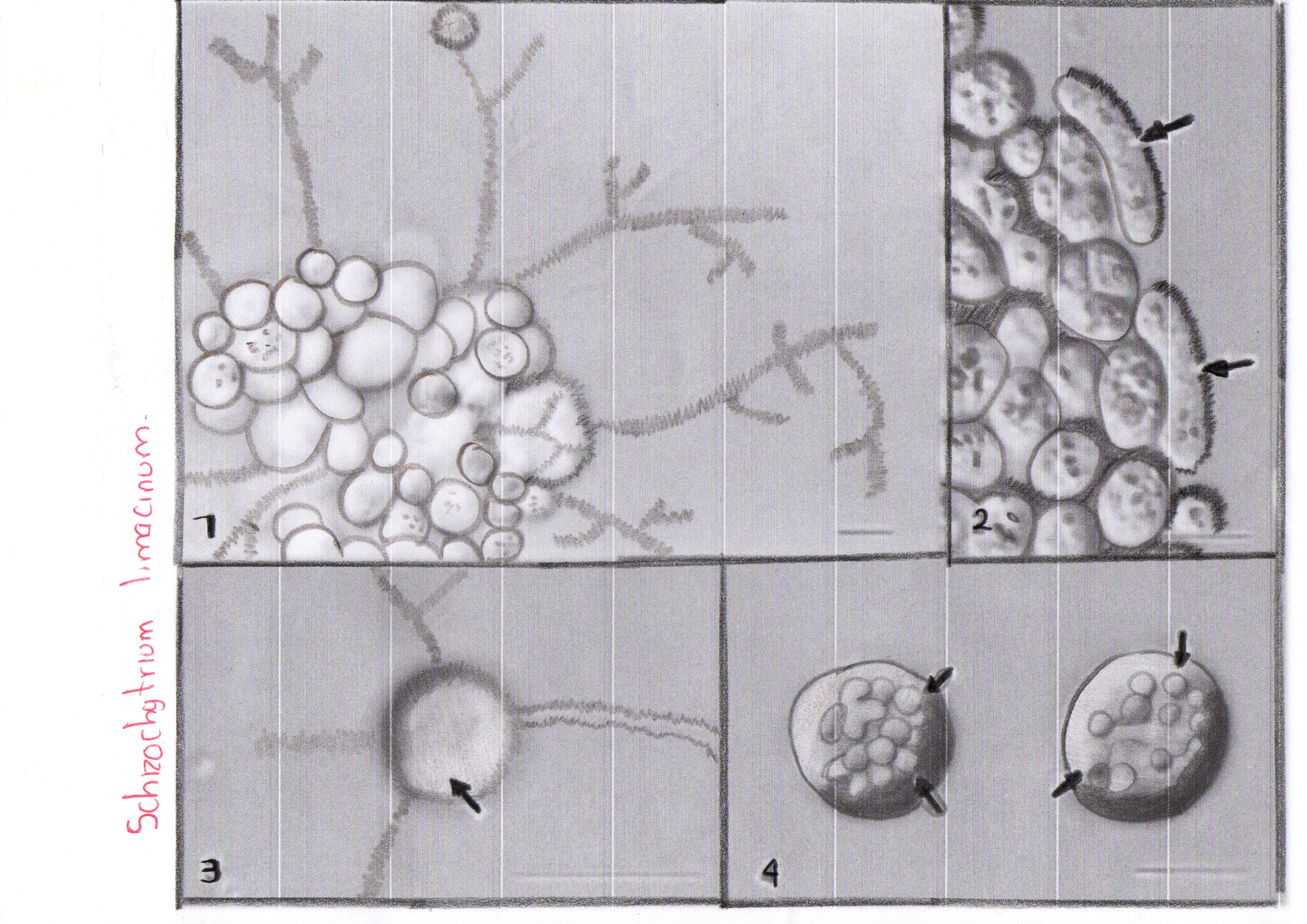

Scientific classification
- Domain: Eukaryota
- Clade: Sar
- Clade: Stramenopiles
- Phylum: Bigyra
- Class: Labyrinthulomycetes
- Order: Thraustochytrida
- Family: Thraustochytriidae
- Genus: Schizochytrium
- Species: S. limacinum

Binomial name
- Schizochytrium limacinum D. Honda & Yokochi, 1998

= Schizochytrium limacinum =

Species of single-celled organism

Schizochytrium limacinum is a species of thraustochytrids first isolated from a mangrove area in the western Pacific Ocean. It differs from other Schizochytrium species in its limaciform amoeboid cells, the size of its zoospores, and its assimilation profile of carbon sources.
