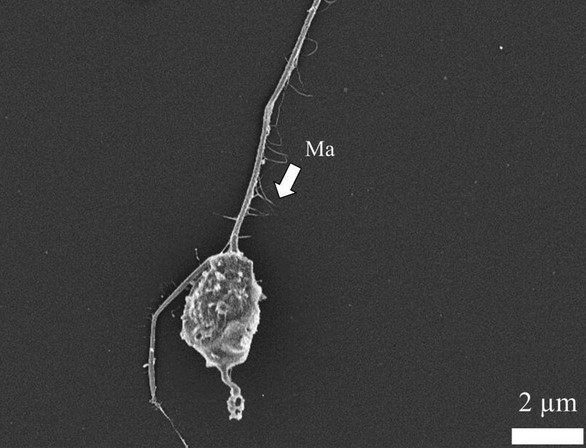
- SEM image of zoospore
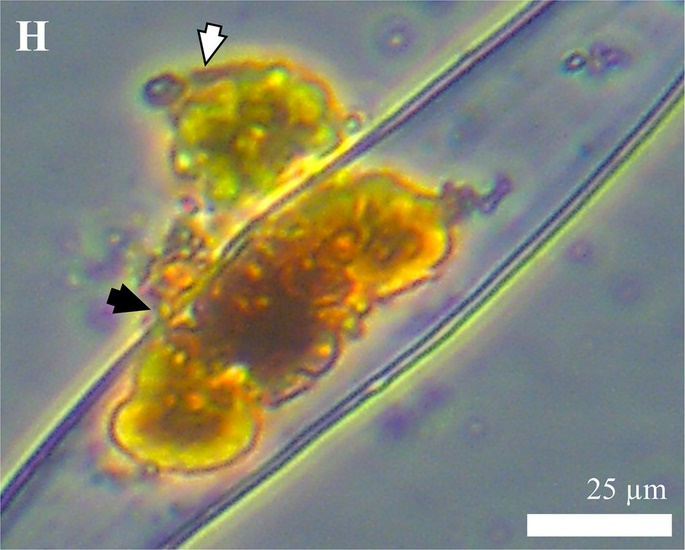
- Sporangium (white arrow) with appendage into diatom (black arrow)

Scientific classification
- Domain: Eukaryota
- Clade: Sar
- Clade: Stramenopiles
- Phylum: Bigyra
- Class: Labyrinthulomycetes
- Order: Thraustochytrida
- Family: Thraustochytriidae
- Genus: Phycophthorum; B.T. Hassett, 2020
- Species: P. isakeiti

Binomial name
- Phycophthorum isakeiti B.T. Hassett, 2020

= Phycophthorum =

Genus of parasitic protists

Phycophthorum is a monotypic genus of protists that parasitize diatoms, containing the sole species Phycophthorum isakeiti. It was discovered in 2020 in the coastal waters of Norway, as parasites of diatoms belonging to the genus Pleurosigma.

== Characteristics ==
Phycophthorum is a genus of widely distributed protists that live as both epibiotic and endobiotic parasites (i.e. capable of inhabiting both the outside and inside of host cells) of diatoms. They reproduce asexually through binary division, and reproduce sexually by formation of sporangia and release of motile zoospores. These motile zoospores then settle and penetrate the frustule of a new diatom host through tubular processes that generate from the cell membrane.

=== Morphology ===
The vegetative cells, zoospores and sporangia of Phycophthorum are hyaline (translucent, colorless). The cells usually have a spheroidal shape and are 2–10 μm in diameter. They contain bothrosomes, vacuoles, lipid inclusions and mitochondria with tubular cristae. The zoospores have the two characteristic flagella seen in other stramenopiles: a short, hairless posterior flagellum and a long anterior one with tiny hairs called mastigonemes.

=== Life cycle ===
The zoospores of Phycophthorum are attracted to healthy Pleurosigma cells through chemotaxis. They move with their flagella towards the diatom cells and attach to the girdle band, valve or silica wall of their frustules. Once attached to the cell wall, the zoospores begin to penetrate the wall, lose their flagella and begin the formation of a sporangium. This structure generates new zoospores that cleave away from their group and obtain a new flagellum to gain motility. The new zoospores swim away from the original host diatom cell and seek out new hosts. The sporangium continues to occupy the dead remains of the host cell. Besides their flagellated form, zoospores can also assume an amoeboid form.

== Systematics ==
=== Discovery and etymology ===
Cells of Phycophthorum isakeiti were isolated from Arctic marine sediment in the coastal waters around Tromsø Municipality, Norway. The microbial culture was parasiting pennate diatoms of the genus Pleurosigma. The cells were examined and described as the genus Phycophthorum by marine microbiologist Brandon T. Hasset, with the results published in the Journal of Eukaryotic Microbiology in 2020. The genus name derives from Greek phyco 'algae' and phtheirein 'to destroy', in reference to its specialized parasitism of diatoms. The sole species, P. isakeiti, is named in honor of the plant pathologist Dr. Thomas Isakeit.

=== Classification ===
Through a phylogenetic analysis using 18S rRNA gene sequences, Phycophthorum isakeiti was positioned within the family Thraustochytriidae as a member of the order Thraustochytrida, in the class Labyrinthulea. These are heterotrophic stramenopiles, eukaryotes with two flagella characterized by the presence of hair-like structures or "mastigonemes" in the longer flagellum. In particular, the Labyrinthulea are characterized by the ability to generate an ectoplasmic net for nutrition. Among them, Thraustochytrida are mostly saprotrophic, although P. isakeiti is among the increasing minority of parasitic thraustochytrids.
