= Thraustochytrium pachydermum =

Scientific classification
- Domain: Eukaryota
- Clade: Diaphoretickes
- Clade: Sar
- Clade: Stramenopiles
- Phylum: Bigyra
- Class: Labyrinthulea
- Order: Thraustochytrida
- Family: Thraustochytriaceae
- Genus: Thraustochytrium
- Species: T. pachydermum

Binomial name
- Thraustochytrium pachydermum E. Scholz, 1958

Species of heterokont

Thraustochytrium pachydermum is a species of heterokont.
