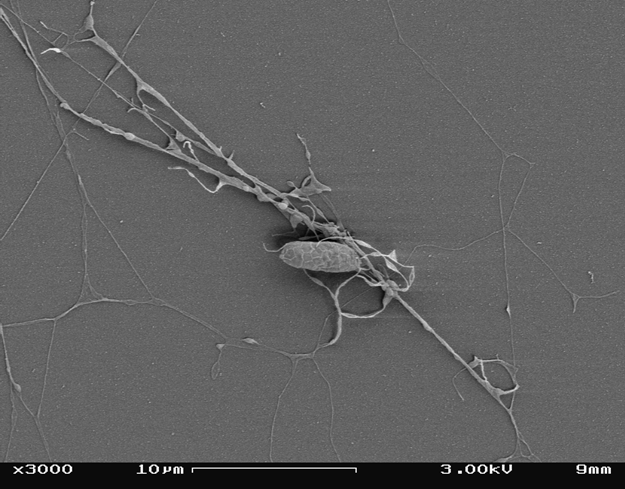
- One vegetative cell and extended ectoplasmic network

Scientific classification
- Domain: Eukaryota
- (unranked): SAR
- (unranked): Heterokonta
- Class: Labyrinthulomycetes
- Order: Labyrinthulida
- Family: Aplanochytriidae
- Genus: Aplanochytrium

= Aplanochytrium =

Genus of single-celled organisms

The genus Aplanochytrium is part of the class Labyrinthulomycetes. It is a sister genus of Labyrinthula and thraustochytrids. The major characteristic of all three genera is the production of an extension of the plasma membrane and the ectoplasm called the ectoplasmic net, but its use is different in each genera. Aplanochytrium cells are not embedded in the ectoplasmic net but can move by gliding on the ectoplasmic threads.

Cells of the genus Aplanochytrium multiply by forming aplanospores in a spherical sporangium. The spores are then released and they move away by crawling along their own ectoplasmic thread. The aplanospores are non-flagellated asexual spores.

Aplanochytrium is found exclusively in marine environments and lives on diverse host organisms. The symbiosis between Aplanochytrium cells and the host organism can be of various origins, like commensal or parasite.

== Etymology ==
The genus Aplanochytrium was identified as a member of the Labyrinthulomycetes because of the formation of non-flagellated and thus non-motile spores, which Bahnweg & Sparrow named "aplanospores". These specific spores formed the base of the name of the genus.

== History of knowledge ==
The genus Aplanochytrium was first described in 1972 by Bahnweg. First included in the order thraustochytrids, Aplanochytrium is now considered a sister group of the thraustochytrids and Labyrinthula. The previous name of Aplanochytrium was Labyrinthuloides. Some species now considered part of Aplanochytrium were first classified in other groups, typically Labyrinthula and thraustochytrids and only reassigned later on into Aplanochytrium. An example is Aplanochytrium yorkensis, which was first considered as Labyrinthula and one year later reclassified into the genera Aplanochytrium.

== Habitat and ecology ==
Aplanochytrium is exclusively marine and their isolates have been found in water samples, sediments, detritus, oyster mantle, gastropods and seagrasses. They can either be free-living in water or as symbiont in host organisms, where some species act as parasitic symbiont.

== Description of the organism ==
=== Morphology and anatomy ===
The general shape of Aplanochytrium cells can be spherical to ovoid and their morphology is characterized by a single nucleus with a prominent nucleolus, numerous tubular mitochondria, a Golgi body and the presence of electron-dense regions at the periphery of the cell known as bothrosomes.

Cells belonging to the genus Aplanochytrium have an average length of 2.4-5 γm. The cell wall surrounding each cell is formed by multiple layers of circular scales mostly composed of fucose, similar to the one in Labyrinthula. They do use photosynthesis as energy source and thus they often have a white or cream colour.

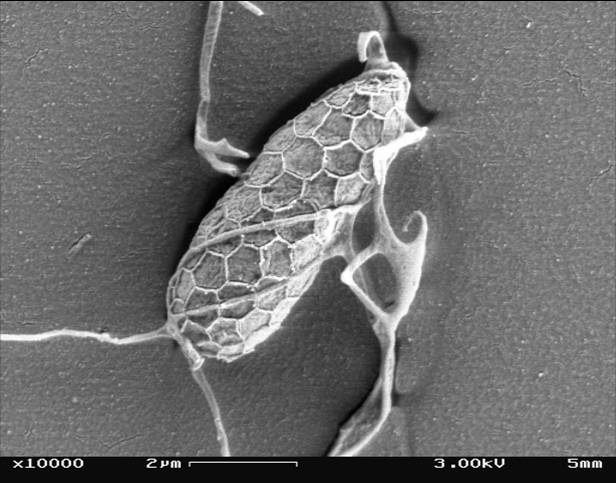
Ectoplasmic network forming basket structure surrounding vegetative cells

A feature characteristic of Aplanochytrium is the production of the ectoplasmic net. The ectoplasmic net is an extension of the ectoplasm and limited by a plasma membrane and forming long threads. It is secreted and attached to the cell by bothrosomes, which are specialized organelles blocking the leaking of the organelles from the cell into the ectoplasmic net. The cells are not surrounded by the ectoplasmic net, unlike the Labyrinthula cells. The binding of the cells to the net allows a slow gliding movement of the cell along the threads.

Different types of morphology of the colonies have been seen. On one side, colonies producing broad rays of continuous band of cells and on the other side, patches of cells spreading from the edge of the colony outwards.

Organisms of different species do not move the same way. Some of them move slowly in a continuous movement, whereas other organisms like Aplanochytrium saliens move through intermittent quick advances. This locomotory style is slow, with a quick jump of 1-6 γm once a minute. Most of the cells leave slime trails behind them, which are passive marks of their passage, when they are gliding on the ectoplasmic net.

=== Life cycle ===
No sexual reproduction cells or structures have been identified yet, but the asexual reproduction cycle is well understood. Aplanochytrium multiply through spores produced by binary fission and held within the parent wall to form a spherical colorless sporangium. These daughter cells are called aplanospores and are not flagellated. Ten to fifty of these spores are released either due to the complete disintegration of the cell wall or through the production of tears at one or two points in the cell wall, through which the spores can leave the sporangium. The latter method of release enables the maintenance of an intact cell wall, which does not need to be synthesized de novo after each division. Once released, the aplanospores move away by gliding on their individual developed ectoplasmic net.

== List of species ==
Species	Discover	Year
Aplanochytrium minuta	Watson & Raper	1957
Aplanochytrium kerguenlensis	Bahnweg & Sparrow	1972
Aplanochytrium yorkensis	Perkins	1973
Aplanochytrium saliens	Quick	1974
Aplanochytrium schizochytrops	Quick	1974
Aplanochytrium thais	Cox & Mackin	1974
Aplanochytrium haliotidis	Bower	1987
Aplanochytrium stocchionoi	Moro	2003
