= Quahog parasite unknown =

Single-celled parasite

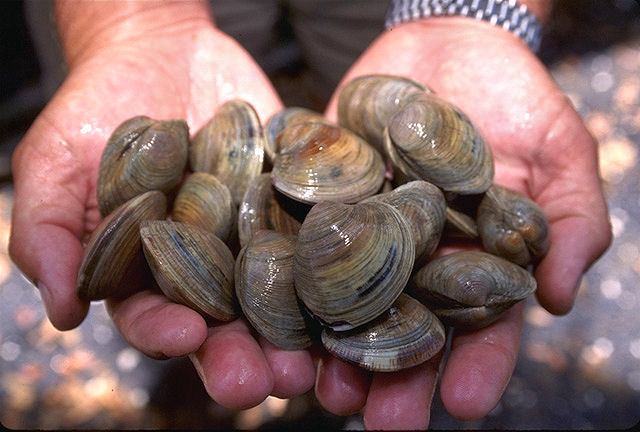
Quahog clams

The quahog parasite unknown, or QPX, is a single-celled protist parasite in the class Labyrinthulomycota that affects hard clams (Mercenaria mercenaria; quahogs), both cultured and wild.

Parasites similar to QPX were first observed in New Brunswick, Canada, in 1959, when a mass death of hard clams was observed. Outbreaks have also occurred in Nova Scotia, Prince Edward Island, New York, New Jersey, Massachusetts, and Virginia, always only in quahog clams.

Symptoms of QPX include chipping of the shells, mantle swelling, stunted shell growth and the development of nodules.

== Biology ==
The life stages of thalli, endospores, and sporangia have been observed. It somewhat resembles the unrelated protist haplosporidian parasite Haplosporidium nelsoni (MPX), a pathogen of the eastern oyster.

QPX was originally considered a chytrid, but has now been provisionally assigned to the phylum Labyrinthulomycota in either the families Thraustochytriidae or Labyrinthulidae, based on the organism having a "uninucleate biflagellate zoospore stage, a loose multilaminar cell wall, and particularly an intracellular sagenogen-like structure". However, much about it is still unknown. QPX-like organisms also may not be all of the same species.

Molecular phylogenetic on the SSU rRNA of QPX was able to produce the same phylum-level identification, and more precisely down to the family Thraustochytriidae next to Thraustochytrium pachydermum. A PCR primer targeting this region that detects QPX infection has been constructed.

QPX can be cultured in laboratories, with the optimal temperature being 20 to 23 °C. It produces a mucus that causes inflammation in the clam and shields itself from clam immune response.

== Genetics ==
The partial genome of QPX has been sequenced by the shotgun method in 2013, along with the transcriptome to identify genes important in stress response (mainly temperature). A few interesting proteins and a wide range of genetic polymorphisms have been identified. It expresses some genes involved in the synthesis of antibiotics that are also toxic to clams. Further experimental characterisation in 2018 of these single-nucleotide polymorphisms shows variations in genes related to virulence and environmental (salinity and temperature) adaptation.
