= Schizochytrium =

Scientific classification
- Domain: Eukaryota
- Clade: Sar
- Clade: Stramenopiles
- Phylum: Bigyra
- Class: Labyrinthulomycetes
- Order: Thraustochytrida
- Family: Thraustochytriidae
- Genus: Schizochytrium; S. Goldst. & Belsky emend. T. Booth & C. E. Mill.

Species
- S. aggregatum S. limacinum S. minutum

Genus of single-celled organisms

Schizochytrium is a genus of unicellular eukaryote, which are found in coastal marine habitats. They are assigned to the Stramenopiles (heterokonts), a group which also contains kelp and various microalgae.

== Lifecycle ==
Several stages occur in its lifecycle. The feeding form has a stiff, rounded body with cellular extensions used in feeding. Cells can transform into mobile flagellated cells with stiff tripartite hairs typical of the Stramenopiles. Cells can also grow and divide to form a cluster of cells which may become a sorus that produces biflagellated zoospores.

== Relation to humans ==
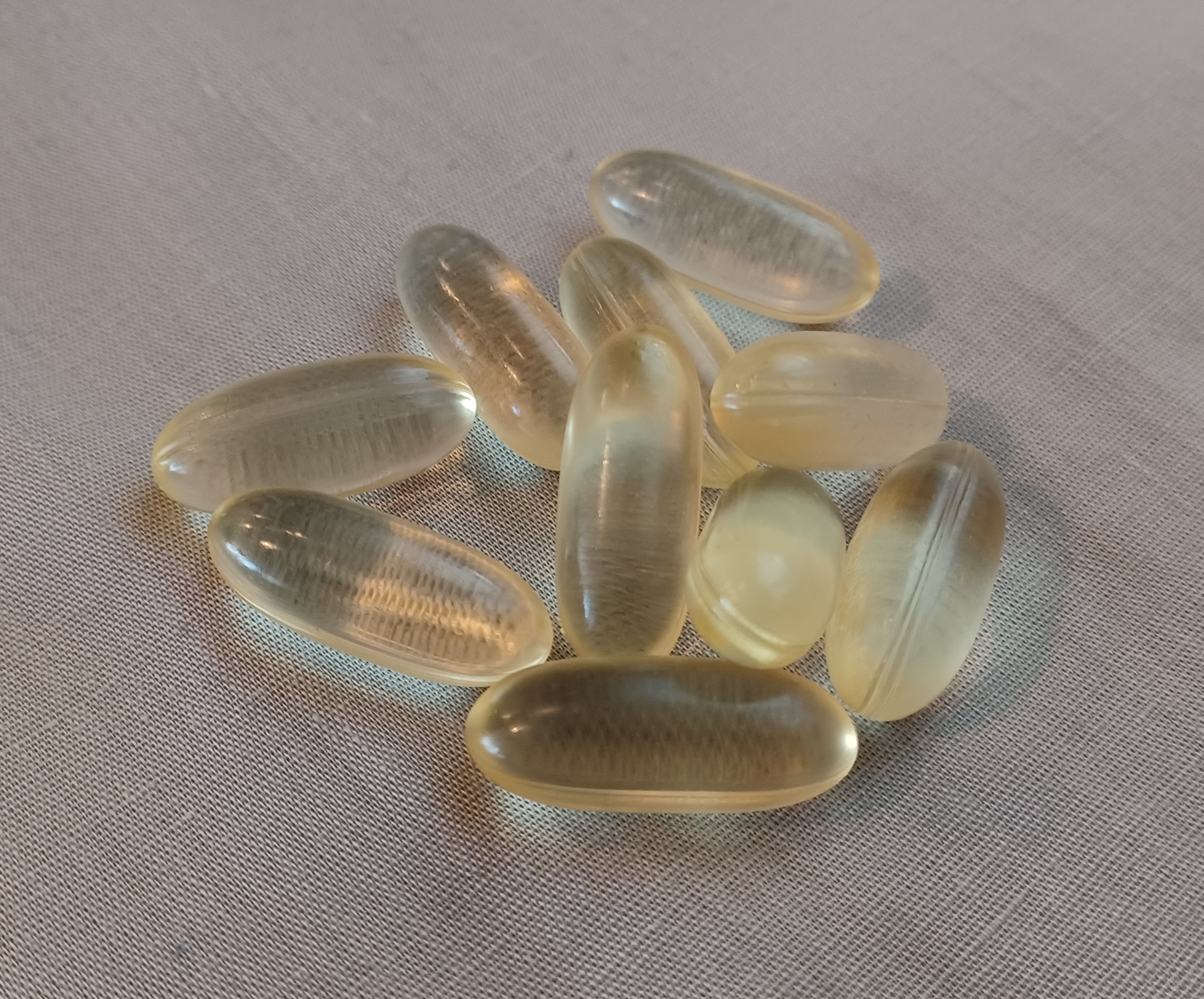
Schizochytrium-based omega-3 supplements for human consumption

Certain species produce large amounts of docosahexaenoic acid (DHA) and are grown commercially for production of algae oil for animal feeds, biomass, biofuels and direct human consumption in supplements and additives.

In 2016, juvenile Nile tilapia were given a feed containing dried Schizochytrium in place of fish oil. When compared to a control group raised on regular feed, they exhibited higher weight gain and better feed conversion, and their flesh was higher in omega-3 fatty acids. A 2020 study showed similar results and combined the feed with Nannochloropsis oculata for an entirely fish-free feed.

== DHA synthesis in Schizochytrium ==
DHA synthesis in Schizochytrium does not involve membrane-bound desaturases or fatty acid elongation enzymes such as those described for other eukaryotes. Instead it is thought that DHA synthesis in Schizochytrium occurs via a Polyketide synthase (PKS)-based pathway, although the primary structures of the Polyketide synthases do not conform to any known class of PKS proteins. Homology between Shewanella and Schizochytrium PKS genes suggests that the genes involved in this pathway underwent lateral gene transfer.
