= Thraustochytrium mitochondrial code =

Mitochondrial genetic code in heterokont protists

The Thraustochytrium mitochondrial code (translation table 23) is a genetic code found in the mitochondria of the labyrinthulid protist Thraustochytrium aureum. The mitochondrial genome was sequenced by the Organelle Genome Megasequencing Program.

== Code ==
AAs = FF*LSSSSYY**CC*WLLLLPPPPHHQQRRRRIIIMTTTTNNKKSSRRVVVVAAAADDEEGGGG
Starts = --------------------------------M--M---------------M------------
Base1 = TTTTTTTTTTTTTTTTCCCCCCCCCCCCCCCCAAAAAAAAAAAAAAAAGGGGGGGGGGGGGGGG
Base2 = TTTTCCCCAAAAGGGGTTTTCCCCAAAAGGGGTTTTCCCCAAAAGGGGTTTTCCCCAAAAGGGG
Base3 = TCAGTCAGTCAGTCAGTCAGTCAGTCAGTCAGTCAGTCAGTCAGTCAGTCAGTCAGTCAGTCAG

Bases: adenine (A), cytosine (C), guanine (G) and thymine (T) or uracil (U).

Amino acids: Alanine (Ala, A), Arginine (Arg, R), Asparagine (Asn, N), Aspartic acid (Asp, D), Cysteine (Cys, C), Glutamic acid (Glu, E), Glutamine (Gln, Q), Glycine (Gly, G), Histidine (His, H), Isoleucine (Ile, I), Leucine (Leu, L), Lysine (Lys, K), Methionine (Met, M), Phenylalanine (Phe, F), Proline (Pro, P), Serine (Ser, S), Threonine (Thr, T), Tryptophan (Trp, W), Tyrosine (Tyr, Y), Valine (Val, V)

== Differences from the standard code ==
It is the similar to the bacterial code (translation table 11) but it contains an additional stop codon (TTA) and also has a different set of start codons.

DNA codons	RNA codons	This code (23)	Standard code (1)
TTA	UUA	STOP = Ter (*)	Leu (L)

== Systematic range and comments ==
- Mitochondria of Thraustochytrium aureum.

== See also ==
- List of genetic codes
