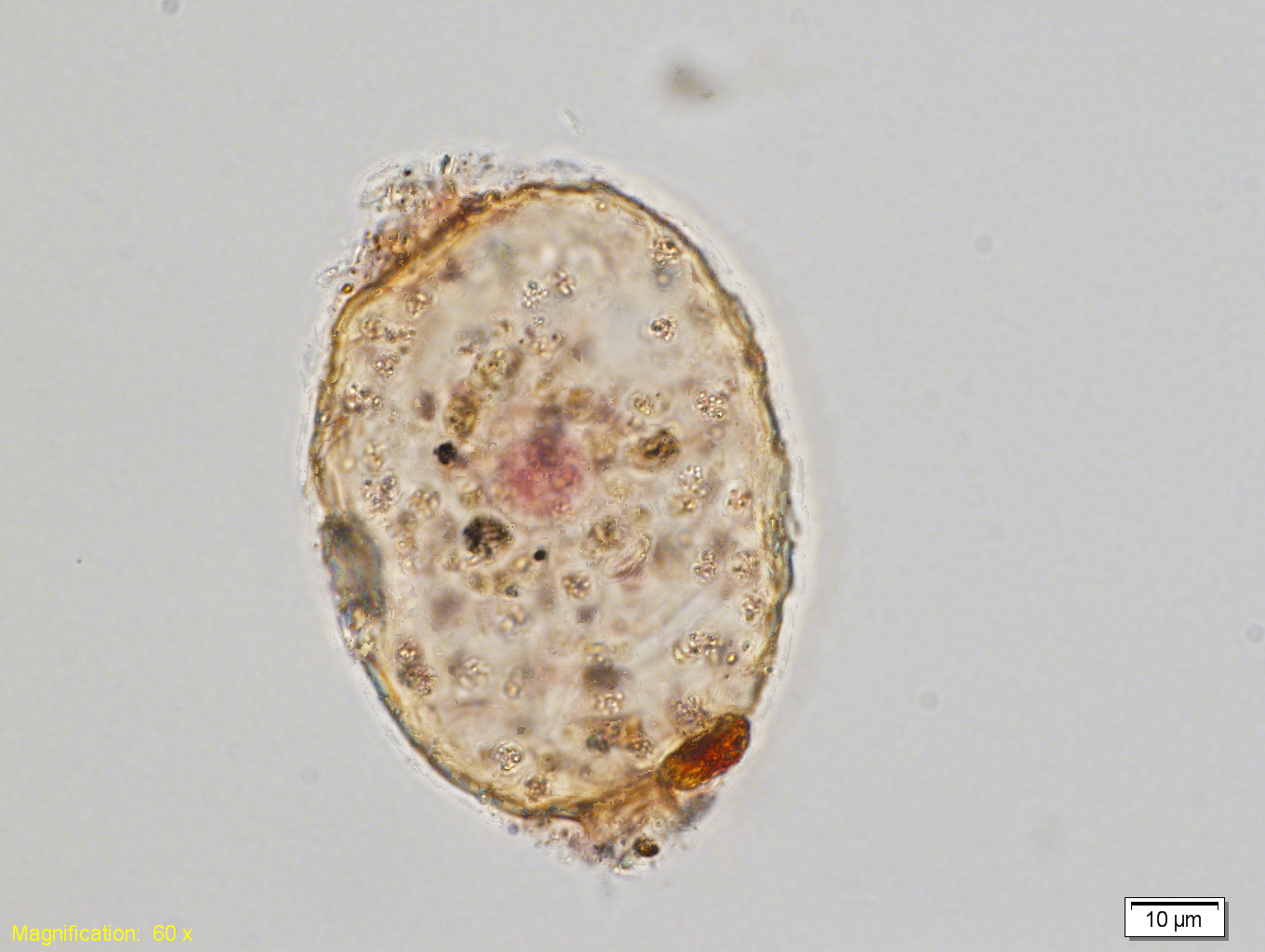
- Amphitrema stenostoma

Scientific classification
- Domain: Eukaryota
- (unranked): SAR
- (unranked): Heterokonta
- Class: Labyrinthulomycetes
- Order: Amphitremida
- Family: Amphitremidae
- Genus: Amphitrema Archer 1758

Species
- ?A. congolense van Oye 1957; ?A. jollyi Van Oye 1956; ?A. paparoensis Van Oye 1956; A. stenostoma Nusslin 1884; A. wrightianum Archer 1869

= Amphitrema =

Genus of single-celled organisms

Amphitrema is a genus of testate amoeba in the family Amphitremidae. The genus is commonly found in Sphagnum-dominated peatlands. All species of this genus are mixotrophic and harbor unicellular algae belonging to genus Chlorella.

== Species ==
- ?Amphitrema congolense van Oye 1957
- ?Amphitrema jollyi Van Oye 1956
- ?Amphitrema paparoensis Van Oye 1956
- Amphitrema stenostoma Nusslin 1884
- Amphitrema wrightianum Archer 1869
