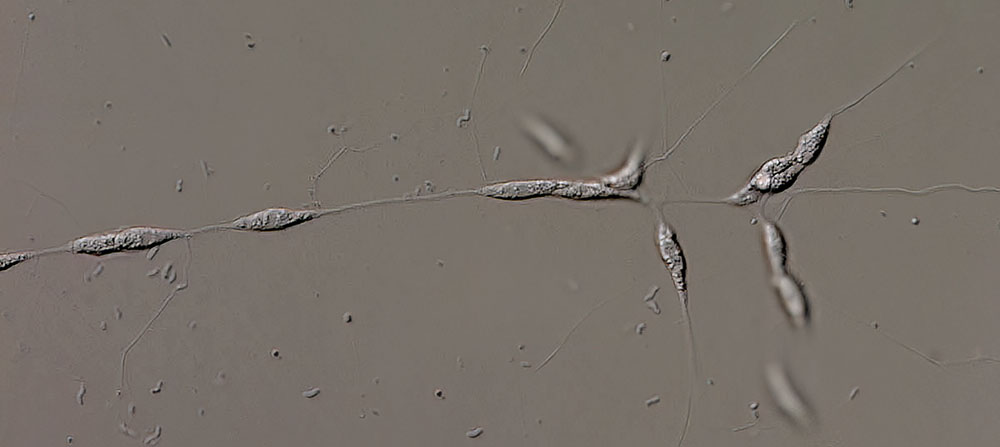
- Spindle-shaped cells of Labyrinthula within an ectoplasmic net. Cells are about 15 μm long.

Scientific classification
- Domain: Eukaryota
- Clade: Sar
- Clade: Stramenopiles
- Phylum: Bigyra
- Class: Labyrinthulomycetes
- Order: Labyrinthulida
- Family: Labyrinthulidae
- Genus: Labyrinthula; Cienkowski 1864

= Labyrinthula =

Genus of single-celled organisms

The genus Labyrinthula, also known as net slime molds, is part of the protist group Labyrinthulomycetes and contains thirteen species. The major feature of this genus is the formation of an ectoplasmic net, secreted by specialized organelles called bothrosomes, which surrounds the colony and is also used by Labyrinthula for moving. The protist reproduces by zoosporulation as it sets some flagellated spores free from a sporangium. One of the flagella of the zoospores has stiff tripartite hairs (mastigonemes) – the defining characteristic of the stramenopiles.

Interest in Labyrinthula arose as it was identified as the cause of a "wasting disease", which led to the death of more than 90% of the seagrass population of the North Atlantic coast in the early 1930s.

== Etymology ==
A labyrinth is a synonym of a maze, reflecting the ectoplasmic net, which gives the protist a net-like shape which resembles a maze. The word comes from Ancient Greek λαβύρινθος (labúrinthos, 'maze').

== History ==
The protistologist Leon Cienkowski was the first person who published on Labyrinthula in 1867. He primarily studied the morphology, and identified two species: L. vitelli and L. macrocystis. In 1967, Pokorny published the first review of Labyrinthula and counted ten marine species, two freshwater species and one terrestrial species.

Before being considered as protists and stramenopiles, Labyrinthula had been classified in the Mycetozoa, the slime molds and the Rhizopoda.

Interest in Labyrinthula started when it was defined as the cause of the "wasting disease". An epidemic happened in the 1930s in the North American and European coasts, killing over 90% of the seagrass (Zostera marina) population. The first description of similar symptoms in terrestrial grasses happened in 1995 in California. The target organism is turfgrass and the pathogen identified by the Koch's postulates is L. terrestris. Both seagrass and turfgrass can be infected by organisms of the Labyrinthula genus, but from different species, one marine and one terrestrial one, respectively.

== Habitat and ecology ==
The habitat of Labyrinthula is very diverse: they are found in marine and freshwater environments, as well as in terrestrial environments all over the world. The genus has been found to live as a pathogen, commensal or mutualist on several host organisms. One example is the endosymbiont Labyrinthula sp. inside Thecamoeba hilla, which seem to live as mutualist symbionts.

== Description ==
=== Morphology and anatomy ===
The morphology of a single cell of Labyrinthula is not unique and varies a lot between the different species. The cells can be spindle-shaped like L. macrocystis, spherical or ovoid to name only a few examples. The spindle shape is due to the microtubules of the cytoskeleton. There is no mean cell size because of the diversity between the species, but an approximation can still be made at 8–30 μm in length and 1.5–8 μm in width. The general morphology of the cell includes a central nucleus, the smooth endoplasmatic reticulum, mitochondria with tubular cristae, numerous lipid-composed granules and two large Golgi complexes. Labyrinthula are non-photosynthetic and are usually translucent white, but some yellow strains have been observed.

==== Ectoplasmic net ====
The defining characteristic of the genera Labyrinthula is the formation of an ectoplasmic net around the cells and embedding the whole colony. The net is secreted and attached to the cell by specialized organelles called segenetosomes or bothrosomes. A bothrosome is an electron-opaque organelle, which prevents the leaking of the organelles into the net. The etymology of bothrosome and sagenetosome originated from Greek bothros ('hole') and soma ('body'), as well as from sagena ('net'), genetes ('ancestor') and soma ('body') respectively. The net is composed of secreted ectoplasm and is delimited by a plasma membrane. It lacks a cell wall and contains no organelles. By forming long filaments, the net allows the colony to attach to surfaces and it secretes digestive enzymes for absorptive nutrition. These enzymes can be surface-bound or secreted into the medium to help the digestion of organic substances. Individual cells use the net for movement by gliding inside it. They move in all directions but tend to go towards the periphery of the net, to enlarge it and thus increase its surface area.

==== Cell wall ====
Despite the lack of cell wall of the ectoplasmic net, each individual cell is surrounded by a cell wall located close to the cell membrane and composed of a single layer of Golgi-derived circular scales, which overlap over a few nanometers, but do not fuse. The main components of the cell wall are fucose or galactose-derived substances.

=== Life cycle ===
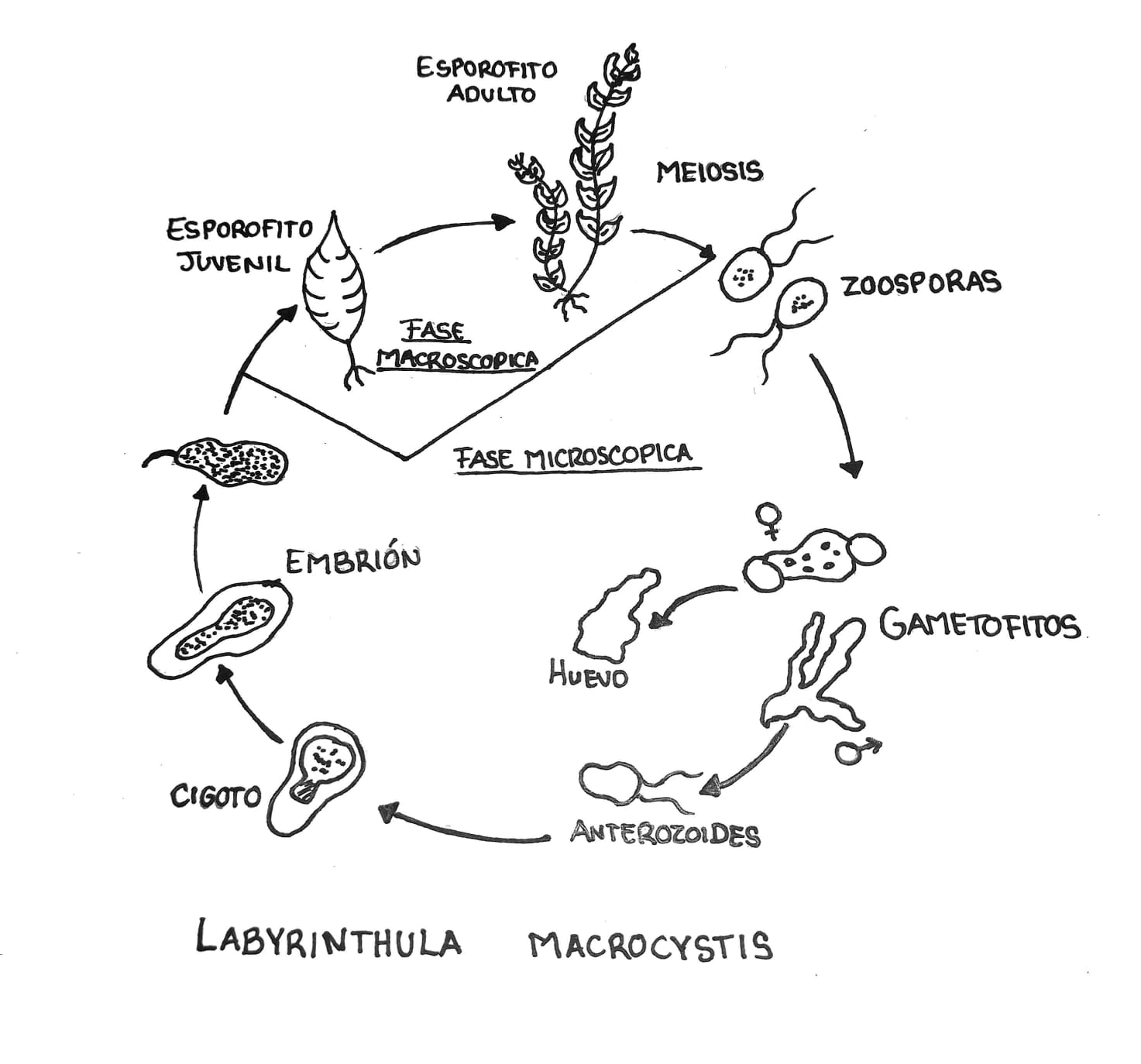
Life cycle of L. macrocystis, by Ximena Gaytan Mosqueda

The reproduction of Labyrinthula occurs by zoosporulation; no sexual reproductive cells or structures have been identified. First, vegetative cells aggregate inside the ectoplasmic net and form yellow to orange networks in different areas of the net. The cells in these aggregates are compressed together and the boundaries blur, which leads to a plasmodium-like appearance. The vegetative cells then round up and enlarge to form a presporangium. The presporangium is delimited by an envelope of scales, which form a rather thick membrane. The presporangium is further divided into sporangia, and in some species into a sorus, until each of them contains eight zoospores. The zoospores are released directly into the ectoplasmic net, where they swim away from the sporangium.

The morphology of the zoospore is similar to a typical stramenopile cell. Zoospores contain an eyespot and two flagella. Only the anterior flagellum is covered with mastigonemes, while the posterior flagellum propels the cell through the ectoplasmic net. Both flagella are inserted laterally and medially. After about 24 hours, the zoospores lose their flagella and round up to finally differentiate into vegetative spindle cells. Vegetative cells stop gliding through the net in older cultures or under bad conditions. Only few of the older cells autolyze, but most of them round up.

Vegetative cells multiply mostly by mitosis. Some features of their binary fission are the de novo synthesis of the bothrosome, and the cytokinesis that occurs by vesicle accumulation and fusion.

== Importance ==
Labyrinthula have awoken the interest of scientists by being the cause of the "wasting disease" of the seagrass on the North American and European coasts in the 1930s. Since then, several pathogenic species have been identified which mostly live in marine water.

Studies testing the virulence of the protist in seagrasses showed a low virulence of Labyrinthula. The protist often lives inside the multicellular organism, but does not initiate any pathogenic event. Pathogenesis may be triggered by biotic or abiotic stress of the higher organism, like a large increase in temperature or a decrease in light exposure for example.

The most famous parasitic symbiont is L. zosterae, which colonizes marine seagrasses referring to the event mentioned above. Typical features of the "wasting disease" are a discolouration of the leaves, due to the destruction of the chloroplasts in epidermis, mesophyll and lesion formation. The second stage is the occurrence of brown and black blotches. The infection and the following consequences are a concern, because of the ecological and economical importance of the seagrass in the marine environment. The infection is transferred by direct contact between the target organisms and correlates with the salinity of the water.

Another parasitic Labyrinthula is L. terrestris, which is a terrestrial parasite of turf grasses. It has been identified by the Koch's postulates as responsible for the rapid blight killing infected turf grasses. Some other symbiont hosts of Labyrinthula are Chaetomorpha media, a green algae and Thecamoeba hilla where they live as mutualistic symbiont.

== List of species ==
Species	Discoverer	Year
L. macrocystis	Cienkowski	1867
L. vitellina	Cienkowski	1867
L. cienkowskii	Zopf	1892
L. zopfii	Dangeard	1910
L. chattonii	Dangeard	1932
L. valkanovii	Karling	1944
L. algeriensis	Hollande & Enjumet	1955
L. roscoffensis	Chadefaud	1956
L. spp / L. zosterae	Watson	1957
L. sp Type LX	Watson	1957
L. sp Type SELX	Watson	1957
L. coenocystis	Schmoller	1960
L. terrestris	Bigelow	2005
