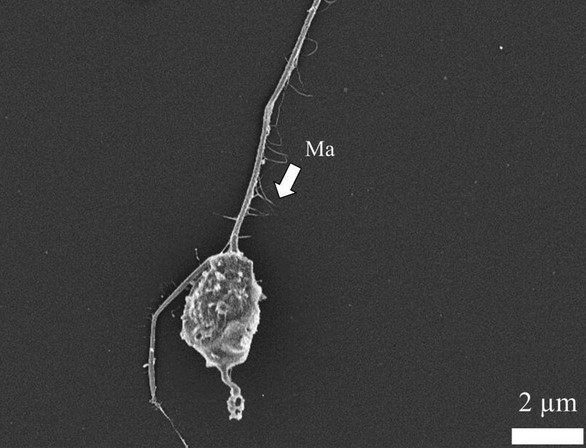
- SEM image of a Phycophthorum zoospore

Scientific classification
- Domain: Eukaryota
- Clade: Sar
- Clade: Stramenopiles
- Phylum: Bigyra
- Class: Labyrinthulomycetes
- Order: Thraustochytrida
- Family: Thraustochytriidae; Sparrow ex Cejp 1959

Type genus
- Thraustochytrium Sparrow, 1936 emend. T.W. Johnson, 1961

Genera
- Aurantiochytrium; Botryochytrium; Hondaea; Japonochytrium; Labyrinthulochytrium; Monorhizochytrium; Phycophthorum; Schizochytrium; Sicyoidochytrium; Thraustochytrium; Ulkenia

Synonyms
- Thraustochytriaceae

= Thraustochytriidae =

Family of microscopic eukaryotes

Thraustochytriidae or Thraustochytriaceae is a family of heterotrophic protists. They are unicellular eukaryotes characterized by round cells that use a cytoplasmic network to feed and anchor to the substrate, with an appearance similar to chytrids.

== Characteristics ==
Members of the Thraustochytriidae form ovoid or spherical thalli (or cells) associated with a fine ectoplasmic (i.e. outer cytoplasm) network of rhizoid-like threads that act as their anchoring and feeding structures. In general size and appearance, these thalli are superficially similar to those of hyphochytrids and chytrid fungi.

== Ecology ==
Thraustochytriidae are mostly saprotrophic. Their usual substrates are decaying plants and macrophyte algae. The most common representatives from Thraustochytriidae are Aurantiochytrium, Schizochytrium, Thraustochytrium and Ulkenia, found on decaying plant remains, in sediments and in sea water. Most species have a very wide or cosmopolitan distribution. They are abundant in estuarines of coastal areas, where their usual substrate arrives from terrestrial ecosystems in the form of detritus.

There are, however, some parasitic organisms present in the family. For example, Phycophthorum parasitizes pennate diatoms. The QPX, of unknown genus or species, is a parasite of the hard clam.

== Systematics ==
Thraustochytriidae/Thraustochytriaceae belongs to the Labyrinthulea, a group of heterotrophic stramenopiles that generate cytoplasmic networks outside their cells. In particular, it is one of the two families of the labyrinthulean order Thraustochytrida, the other one being Althorniidae with only one genus, Althornia. As all remaining thraustochytrids belong to Thraustochytriidae, it is the most taxonomically diverse family of the order.
