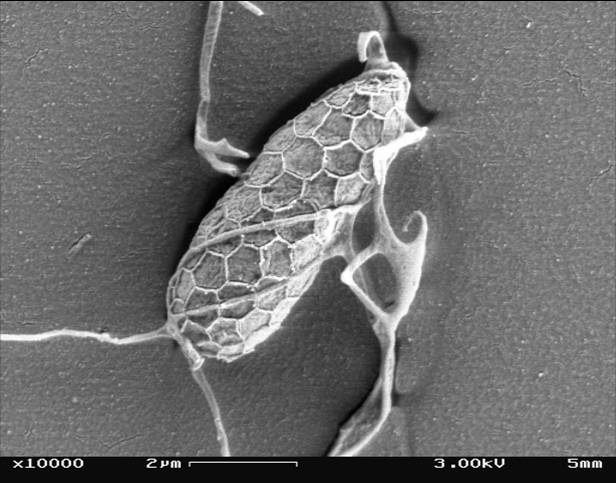
- Cell with network of ectoplasmic filaments (Aplanochytrium sp.)

Scientific classification
- Domain: Eukaryota
- Supergroup: Stramenopiles
- Phylum: Bigyra
- Subphylum: Sagenista
- Class: Labyrinthulomycetes; Arx, 1970, Dick, 2001

Orders
- Amphitremida; Amphifilida; Oblongichytrida; Labyrinthulida; Thraustochytrida

Synonyms
- Labyrinthulomycota Whittaker, 1969; Labyrinthomorpha Page in Levine et al., 1980; Labyrinthulea Olive, 1975 ex Cavalier-Smith, 1989

= Labyrinthulomycetes =

Class of protists that produce a filamentous network

Labyrinthulomycetes (ICNafp) or Labyrinthulea (ICZN) is a class of protists that produce a network of filaments or tubes, which serve as tracks for the cells to glide along and absorb nutrients for them. The two main groups are the labyrinthulids (or slime nets) and thraustochytrids. They are mostly marine, commonly found as parasites on algae and seagrasses or as decomposers on dead plant material. They also include some parasites of marine invertebrates and mixotrophic species that live in a symbiotic relationship with zoochlorella.

== Characteristics ==
Although they are outside the cells, the filaments of Labyrinthulomycetes are surrounded by a membrane. They are formed and connected with the cytoplasm by a unique organelle called a sagenogen or bothrosome. The cells are uninucleated and typically ovoid, and move back and forth along the amorphous network at speeds varying from 5-150 μm per minute. Among the labyrinthulids, the cells are enclosed within the tubes, and among the thraustochytrids, they are attached to their sides.

== Evolution ==
=== Evolutionary origin ===
Labyrinthulomycetes are not fungi, but a monophyletic group of eukaryotes within the Stramenopiles. They belong to the phylum Bigyra, which contains other heterotrophic microorganisms such as the bicosoecids. Considering that the plastids from Stramenopiles are possibly the result of an event of endosymbiosis in their last common ancestor, the bicosoecids and the labyrinthulomycetes could have originated from a mixotrophic algal common ancestor that secondarily lost their plastids.

Some characteristics of the labyrinthulomycetes can be explained by their origin from ancestral plastids. They produce omega-3 poly-unsaturated fatty acids using a desaturase usually present in chloroplasts. The zoospores of labyrinthulids have an eyespot composed of membrane-bound granules that resembles eyespots of photosynthetic stramenopiles, which are either within a plastid or believed to be derived from a plastid.

Within Bigyra, the labyrinthulomycetes are the sister group to Eogyrea, a class containing the species Pseudophyllomitus vesiculosus and the environmental clade called MAST-4. Together they compose the subphylum Sagenista.

- Stramenopiles
  - - Gyrista
      - Ochrophyta
      - plastid loss
        Pseudofungi
    - Bigyra plastid loss
      - Opalozoa
        - Placidozoa
        - Bicosoecida
      - Sagenista
        - Labyrinthulomycetes
        - Eogyrea
  - Platysulcea

== Classification ==
Labyrinthulomycetes or Labyrinthulea used to compose the defunct fungal phylum Labyrinthulomycota. They were originally considered unusual slime moulds, although they are not very similar to the other sorts. The structure of their zoospores and genetic studies show them to be a primitive group of heterokonts, but their classification and treatment remains somewhat unsettled.

This class usually contained two orders, Labyrinthulales and Thraustochytriales (ICBN), or Labyrinthulida and Thraustochytrida (ICZN), but a different classification has recently been proposed.

- Order Labyrinthulales/Labyrinthulida E. A. Bessey 1950/Doffein 1901
  - Family Aplanochytriaceae/Aplanochytriidae Leander ex Cavalier-Smith 2012
    - Aplanochytrium Bahnweg & Sparrow 1972 [=Labyrinthuloides Perkins 1973]
  - Family Labyrinthulaceae/Labyrinthulidae Haeckel 1868/Cinekowksa 1867
    - Labyrinthomyxa Duboscq 1921
    - Pseudoplasmodium Molisch 1925
    - Labyrinthula Cienkowski 1864 [=Labyrinthodictyon Valkanov 1969; Labyrinthorhiza Chadefaud 1956]
  - Family-level clade "Stellarchytriaceae/Stellarchytriidae" – this group is provisionally placed in Labyrinthulida but, according to phylogenetic analyses, diverges before the rest of labyrinthulean clades.
    - Stellarchytrium FioRito & Leander 2016
- Order Oblongichytriales/Oblongichytrida
  - Family Oblongichytriaceae/Oblongichytriidae Cavalier-Smith 2012
    - Oblongichytrium Yokoyama & Honda 2007
- Order Thraustochytriales/Thraustochytrida Sparrow 1973
  - Pyrrhosorus Juel 1901
  - Thanatostrea Franc & Arvy 1969
  - Family Althornidiaceae/Althorniidae Jones & Alderman 1972
    - Althornia Jones & Alderman 1972
  - Family Thraustochytriacae/Thraustochytriidae Sparrow ex Cejp 1959
    - Japanochytrium Kobayasi & Ôkubo 1953
    - Monorhizochytrium Doi & Honda 2017
    - Sicyoidochytrium Yokoy., Salleh & Honda 2007
    - Aurantiochytrium Yokoy. & Honda 2007
    - Ulkenia Gaertn. 1977
    - Parietichytrium Yokoy., Salleh & Honda 2007
    - Botryochytrium Yokoy., Salleh & Honda 2007
    - Schizochytrium Goldst. & Belsky emend. Booth & Mill.
    - Thraustochytrium Sparrow 1936
    - Hondaea Amato & Cagnac 2018
    - Labyrinthulochytrium Hassett & Gradinger 2018
- Order Amphitrematales/Amphitremida Gomaa et al. 2013
  - Family "Amphitremidiaceae"/Amphitremidae Poch 1913
    - Paramphitrema Valkanov 1970
    - Archerella Loeblich & Tappan 1961
    - Amphitrema Archer 1867
  - Family "Diplophrydaceae"/Diplophryidae Cavalier-Smith 2012
    - Diplophrys Barker 1868
- Order "Amphifilales"/Amphifilida Cavalier Smith 2012
  - Family Sorodiplophryidae Cavalier-Smith 2012
    - Sorodiplophrys Olive & Dykstra 1975
    - Fibrophrys Takahashi et al. 2016
  - Family Amphifilidae Cavalier-Smith 2012
    - Genus Amphifila Cavalier-Smith 2012

== Genetic code ==
The labyrinthulomycete Thraustochytrium aureum is notable for the alternative genetic code of its mitochondria which use TTA as a stop codon instead of coding for Leucine. This code is represented by NCBI translation table 23, Thraustochytrium mitochondrial code.

Genetic code	Translation table	DNA codon	RNA codon	Translation with this code	Standard code (Translation table 1)
Thraustochytrium mitochondrial	23	TTA	UUA	STOP = Ter (*)	Leu (L)

== Gallery ==
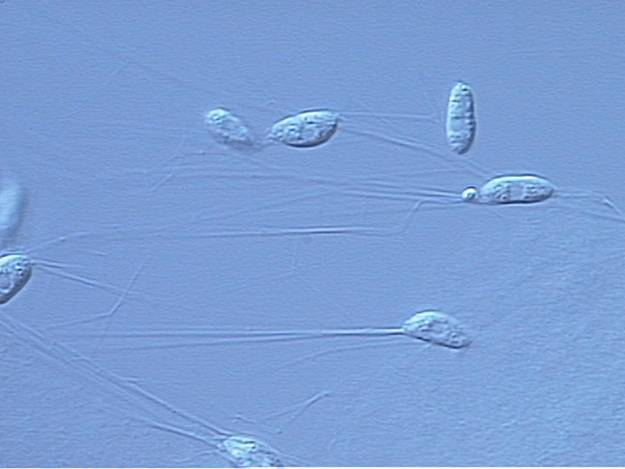
Aplanochytrium sp. under light microscope

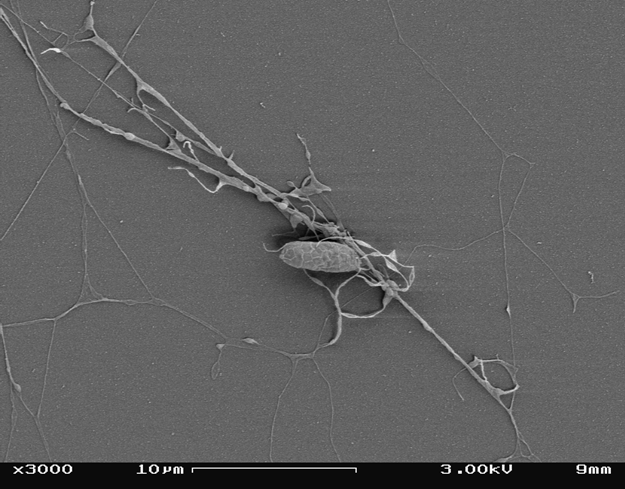
Aplanochytrium sp. under SEM

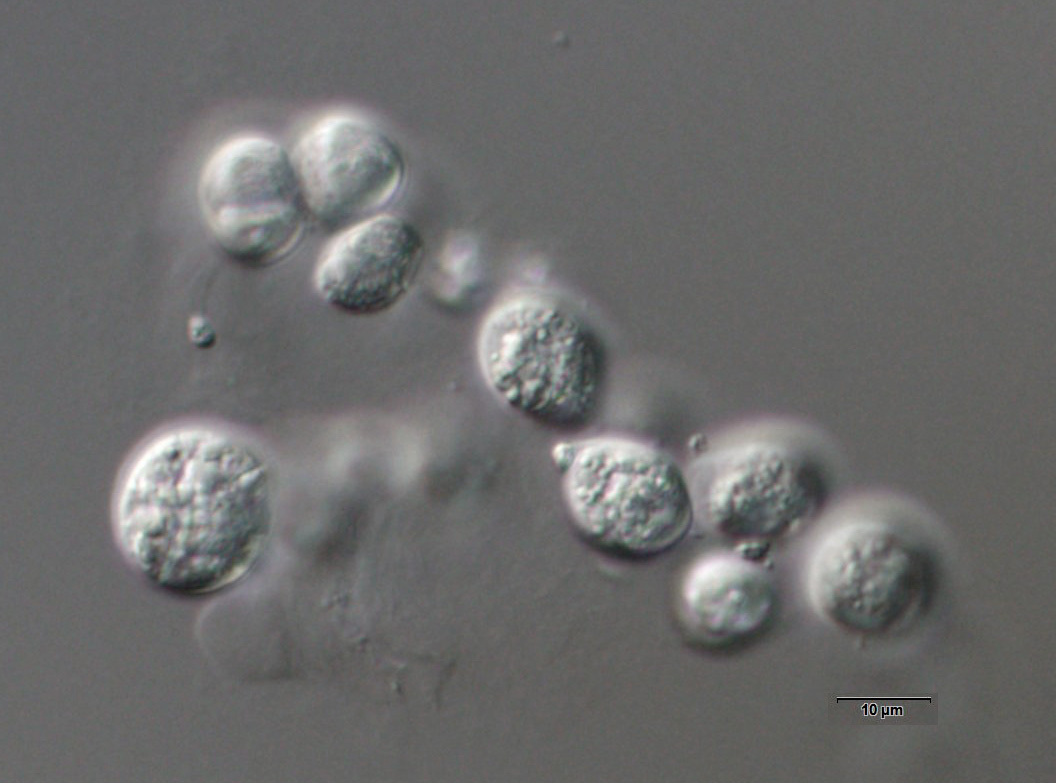
Aurantiochytrium sp.

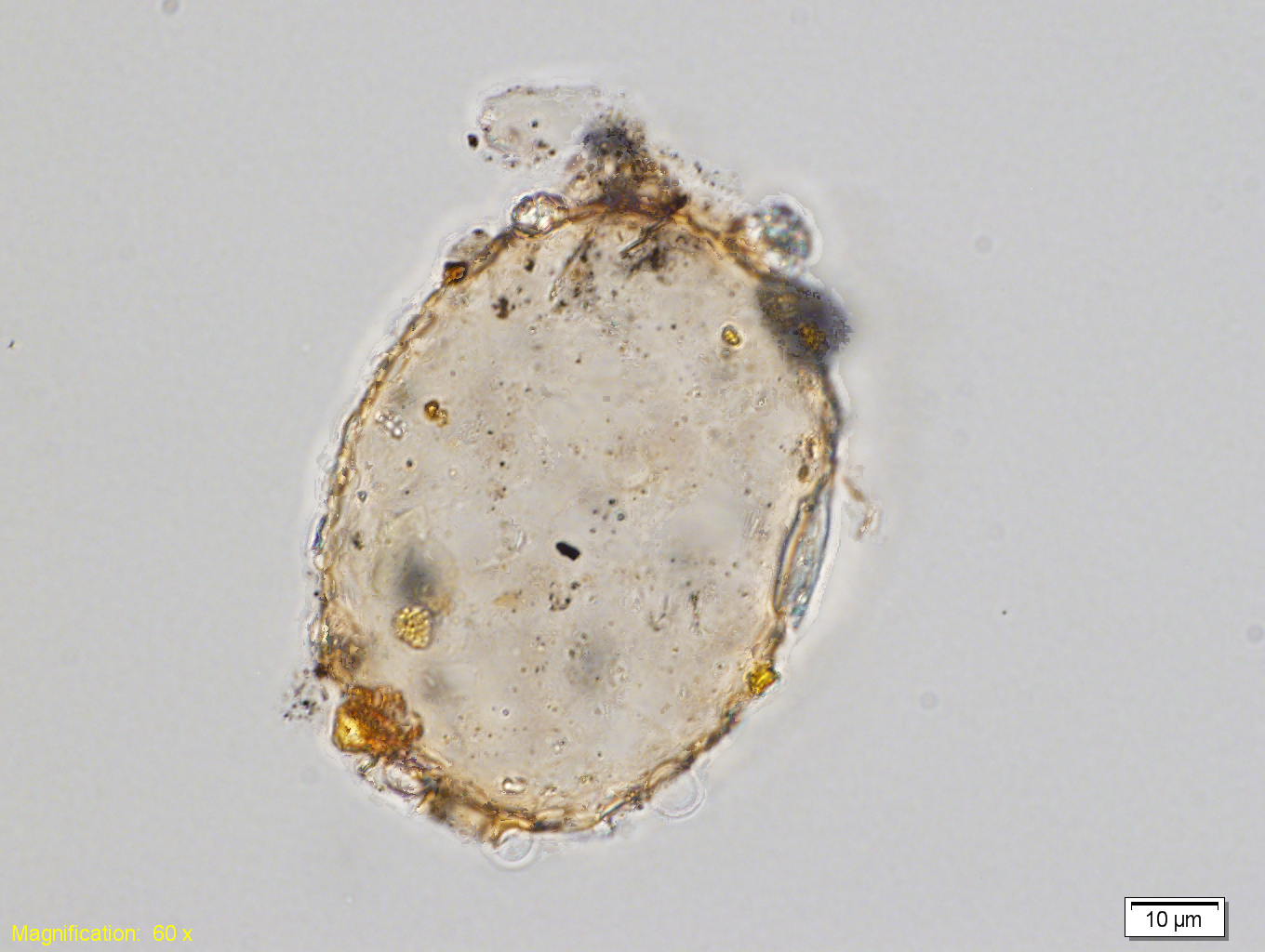
Test of Amphitrema, a testate amoeba recently included in the group

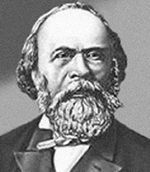
Leon Cienkowski, Russian botanist who in 1867 described Labyrinthula, the first genus of the group
