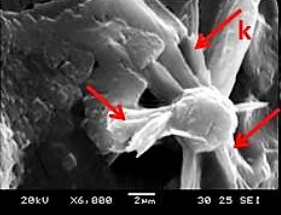
- SEM image of thraustochytrid showing ectoplasmic net.

Scientific classification
- Domain: Eukaryota
- Supergroup: Stramenopiles
- Phylum: Bigyra
- Class: Labyrinthulomycetes
- Order: Thraustochytrida; Sparrow, 1973

Families
- Althorniidae; Amphifilidae; Amphitremidae; Diplophryidae; Oblongichytriidae; Sorodiplophryidae; Thraustochytriidae

Synonyms
- Labyrinthulales

= Thraustochytrid =

Order of eukaryotes

Thraustochytrids are single-celled saprotrophic eukaryotes (decomposers) that are widely distributed in marine ecosystems, and which secrete enzymes including, but not limited to amylases, proteases, phosphatases. They are most abundant in regions with high amounts of detritus and decaying plant material. They play an important ecological role in mangroves, where they aid in nutrient cycling by decomposing decaying matter. Additionally, they contribute significantly to the synthesis of omega-3 polyunsaturated fatty acids (PUFAs): docosahexaenoic acid (DHA), and eicosapentaenoic acid (EPA), which are essential fatty acids for the growth and reproduction of crustaceans. Thraustochytrids are members of the class Labyrinthulea, a group of protists that had previously been incorrectly categorized as fungi due to their similar appearance and lifestyle. With the advent of DNA sequencing technology, labyrinthulomycetes were appropriately placed with other stramenopiles and subsequently categorized as a group of Labyrinthulomycetes.

There are several characteristics which are unique to Thraustochytrids, including their cell wall made of extracellular non-cellulosic scales, zoospores with characteristic heterokont flagella, and a bothrosome-produced ectoplasmic net, which is used for extracellular digestion. Thraustochytrids are morphologically variable throughout their life cycle. They have a main vegetative asexual cycle, which can vary depending on the genus. While sexual reproduction has been observed in this group, it remains poorly understood.

Thraustochytrids are of particular biotechnical interest due to their high concentrations of docosahexaenoic acid (DHA), palmitic acid, carotenoids, and sterols, all of which have beneficial effects to human health. Thraustochytrids rely on a plethora of resources such as various sources of organic carbon (vitamins and sugars), and inorganic salts throughout their life cycle. Scientists have devised several potential uses for thraustochytrids stemming around increasing DHA, fatty acids, and squalene concentrations in vivo by either changing the genetic makeup or medium composition/conditioning. There have also been some breakthroughs which have resulted in gene transfers to plant species in order to make isolation of certain oils easier and cost effective. Thraustochytrids are currently cultured for use in fish feed and production of dietary supplements for humans and animals. In addition, scientists are currently researching new methodologies to convert waste water into useful products like squalene, which can then be utilized for the production of biofuel.

== Morphology ==
As labyrintulomycetes, thraustochytrids share distinct characteristics with other organisms in this group. These include, but are not limited to: biflagellate zoospores which have an anterior flagellum containing mastigonemes, a bothrosome-produced ectoplasmic net, and multilamellate cell walls with scales derived from Golgi bodies. Thraustochytrids are single-celled protists, characterized with only one sporangium (monocentric), an ectoplasmic net, and a multi-layered, non-cellulosic cell wall made of overlapping circular scales. Despite often being referred to as algae, they do not have a plastid, making them obligate heterotrophs.

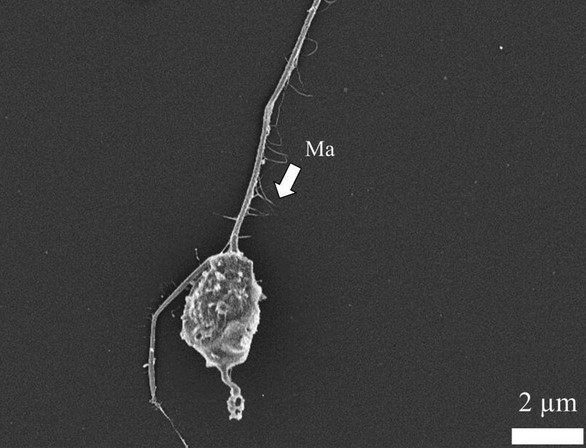
Thraustochytrid zoospore (Phycophthorum isakeiti) with heterokont flagella.

At their vegetative state, thraustochytrids measure 4 to 20 μm in diameter and are globose or subglobose in shape. They have a multi-layered cell wall made of sulphated galactose. The singular sporangium of thraustochytrids is typically ovular or spherical in shape, and varies across genus. In the Botryochytrium genus, for example, the shape of the zoosporangium was compared to a grape. Thraustochytrids have biflagellate zoospores with heterokont flagella typical of other Stramenopiles. On the posterior end, the whiplash is short, and on the anterior end, a long tinsel flagellum protrudes.

=== Ultrastructure ===
Within the granular cytoplasm lies single dictyosomes, centrioles, endoplasmic reticulum, mitochondria, and lipid bodies in some cases. Thraustochytrids contain many mitochondria, which are polymorphic and have tubular cristae. Made of sulphated polysaccharides, the cell wall of thraustochytrids are multilamellate and non-cellulosic. The cell wall is derived from the dictyosome cisternae during thallus development, where circular scales (vesicles) form on the basal membrane to merge. In thraustochytrids, the cell wall is rich in galactose and xylose.

Characteristic of thraustochytrids is their ectoplasmic net—which is an extension of the plasma membrane —emerging from the bothrosome (also known as the sagenogenetosome, or SAG). The cytoplasmic net is unilateral, motile, and resembles fine fibres when viewed under a scanning electron micrograph. Depending on the genus, they may be branched or unbranched, and are thought to originate from a single trunk or organelle. Ectoplasmic nets have the capacity to excrete hydrolytic enzymes (cellulases, amylases, lipases, phosphatases, and/or proteases) to digest organic material in the water, thus assuming the role of decomposition. In lab settings, the endoplasmic net of thraustochytrids has been shown the ability to penetrate the sporopollenin of pine pollen, which comprises a polymer that is highly resistant to microbial degradation. This experimental process is called pollen-baiting. Beyond decomposition, ectoplasmic nets also participate in providing adhesive function, as well as assimilation of digested organic material (absorption).

== Life cycle ==
The life cycle of thraustochytrids is generally complicated, differing from genus to genus, and typically consisting of multiple stages of cell types such as zoosporangia, multinucleated cells, mononucleated cells, and amoeboid cells.

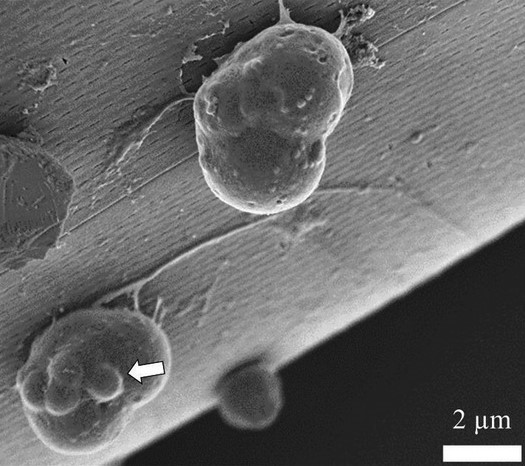
Thraustochytrid cells (Phycophthorum isakeiti) with ectoplasmid threads undergoing binary division.

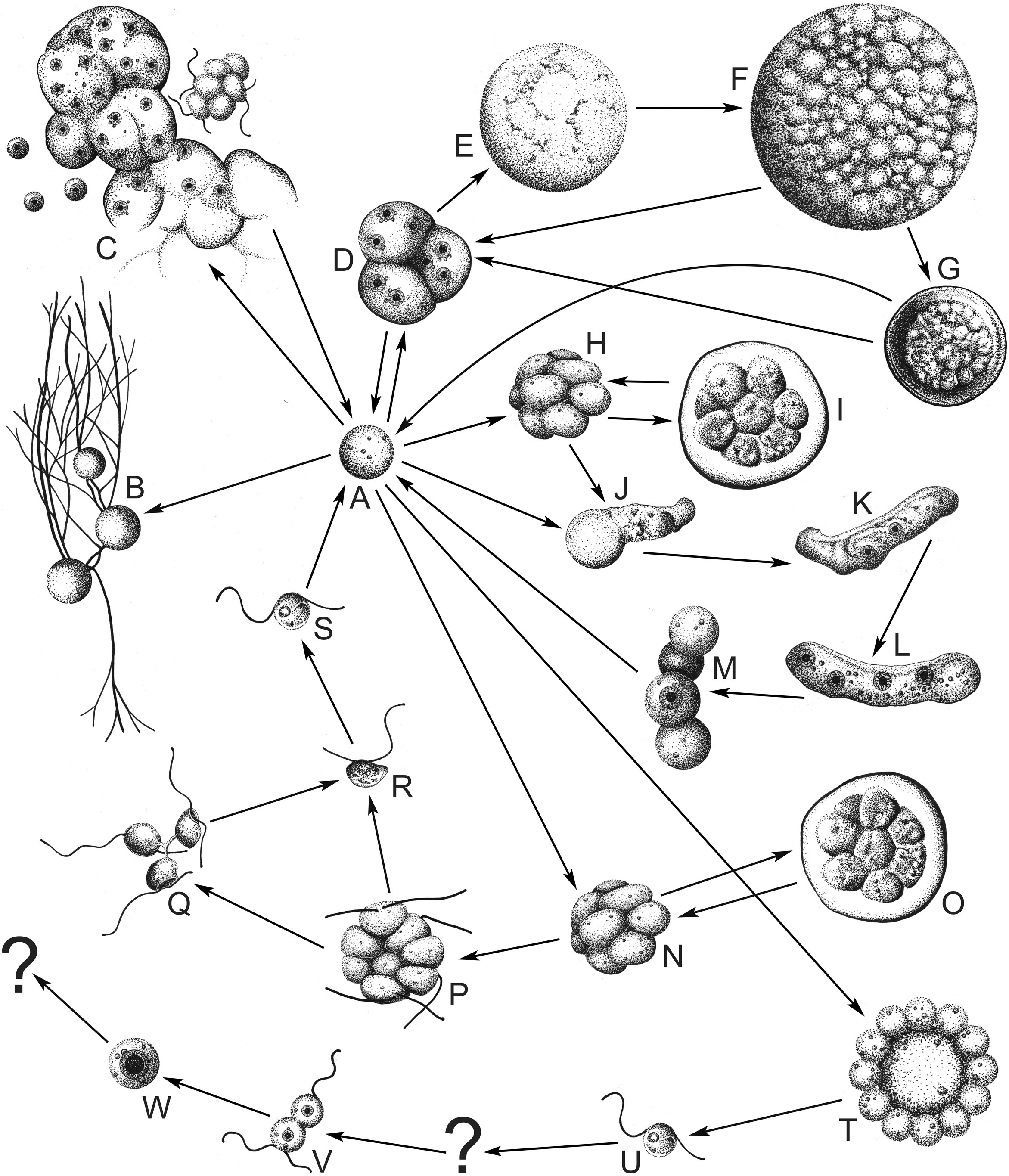
Illustration of a thraustochytrid life cycle (Aurantiochytrium acetophilum). A: typical small sporogenous cell. B: vegetative cells with ectoplasmic nets. C: sporogenous multinucleate cell mass producing small sporogenous cells and a Type I sporangium. D: tetrad of multinucleate sporogenous cells. E: typical large vegetative cell before filled with lipids. F: large oleaginous cell. G: cyst. H: amoebosporangium. I: encysted amoebosporangium. J: amoebospore transforming into an amoeba. K: binucleate amoeba. L: quadranucleate amoeba. M: four uninucleate amoebospores. N: type I zoosporangium before flagella formation. O: encysted zoosporangium. P: type I zoosporangium with flagellate cells. Q: three zoospores connected by a cytoplasmic band. R: younger single pyriform zoospore. S: older single spherical zoospore. T: type II sporangium. U: small spherical swimming cell (gamete?). V: initial fusing of two motile gametes. W: uninucleate zygote.

=== Asexual reproduction ===
All thraustochytrids undergo a main vegetative life cycle, beginning as a mononucleated cell that undergoes nuclear division to become multinucleated and maturing into a sporangia which release zoospores to begin the cycle again. Branching off of the main vegetative life cycle, additional paths can be taken based on the strain. Traustochytrids undergo cell division in two main ways: through a zoosporangium or through successive bipartition. These methods can occur in the same species and at different stages of the lifecycle. When cell division occurs through the formation of a zoosporangium, the nuclei divide within a single cell to create a multinucleate cell which becomes a zoosporangium following progressive cleavage. When cells divide through successive bipartition, the cell divides immediately after nuclear division, either by invagination of the plasma membrane or fusion with internal vesicular membranes. Thraustochytrids undergo open mitosis, meaning that the nuclear membrane breaks down during cell division, and then reforms following nuclear division.

==== Amoeboid loop ====
Certain strains of thraustochytrid are able to enter an amoeboid loop from multiple vegetative life cycle stages, gaining an advantage of being able to move slowly across surfaces as either mononucleated or multinucleated amoeboid cells. Ulkenia, Schizochytrium, Hondaea, and Aurantiochytrium can undergo binary division to form a cluster of mononucleated cells which can then turn into amoeboid cells and enter an amoeboid loop. The amoeboid loop can also be entered from mononucleated cells directly turning into mononucleated amoeboid cells or multinucleated cells and sporangia directly turning into multinucleated amoeboid cells. Strains in the amoeboid loop eventually have to re-enter the main vegetative life cycle in order to produce zoospores.

=== Sexual reproduction ===
Although the details of sexual reproduction are poorly understood, vegetative cells are thought to be diploid and undergo meiosis to form a sporangium, which releases gametes. While syngamy has been observed in Aurantiochytrium acetophilum, the fate of the zygote is relatively unknown, however, it is suspected that they enter the vegetative cycle as a mononucleated cell.

== Taxonomy ==
Thraustochytrids were first reported by F.K. Sparrow in 1934. Like other Labyrinthulomycetes, they were classified as fungi due to their ectoplasmic nets and ability to produce zoospores. However, the morphological plasticity of thraustochytrids prevents them from being accurately classified based on their appearance. It was not until 1973 that Sparrow reclassified them as oomycetes, indicating that they were stramenopiles and not fungi. In the years that followed, scientists began to perform concurrent morphological and molecular genetics studies to further explore the placement of thraustochytrids. Using ribosomal RNA as a phylogenetic marker, Cavalier-Smith et al. provided strong molecular evidence that indicated thraustochytrids were not closely related to fungi or oomycetes. Other studies supported these findings by highlighting morphological similarities between thraustochytrids and other labyrinthulomycetes. While the phylogeny of thraustochytrids is still relatively unresolved, they have been clearly defined taxonomically. Thraustochytrida is one of two orders in the class Labyrinthulea and the nomenclature in this group is highly variable due to its history of being considered fungi.

== Ecology ==
=== Distribution ===
Thraustochytrids have been found in various habitats such as tropical coasts in the Indian Ocean, Pacific Ocean, and the Northern Arabian sea; temperate and cold waters in Australia, Argentina, the Mediterranean Sea, and the North sea; and subantarctic, antarctic, and subarctic waters. Overall, thraustochytrids are widespread in marine waters. They can be found all the way through the photic, euphotic, and aphotic zones. The ideal salinity range for this protist is ~20‰-30‰; however they are euryhaline and can survive at a salinities as low as 12‰. Since they require a specific concentration of salt to survive, they are categorized as halophilic protists.

=== Living conditions ===
Additionally, they require sodium to live and this cannot be substituted by potassium. They are found at a higher frequency in systems that have large amounts of detritus along with decaying plant material. Areas of note include mangroves, salt marshes, and river output zones. Thraustochytrids gain a significant amount of nutrients for growth from any form of decaying organic matter and, as a result, can thrive in areas with elevated pollution or rich in organic material. They can be found on materials either indigenous (autochthonous) or that has been transported there (allochthonous). They are not commonly found on living organisms, and if they are, it is sporadic and in low concentrations. The reasoning for this is suspected to be due to plants being able to release antimicrobial compounds to prevent them from being colonized by microorganisms. In the early stages of decomposition, there are low observed numbers of thraustochytrids as there are still materials that inhibit growth on the organism.

As decomposition progresses, thraustochytrids rapidly populate the substrate. In studies involving mangroves, the thraustochytrids on the leaves would produce the enzymes cellulase, amylase, xylanase, proteases, and pectinases, which suggest that they can play a role in the chemical processes taking place. There have been cases of thraustochytrids being cultured from algal surfaces but only in low numbers. Notably, in a case of culturing thraustochytrids on the brown alga Fucus serratus, they were found to be in low numbers potentially due to inhibitory material being secreted by the alga. A 1992 experiment found that thraustochytrids could not be cultured on the green algae Ulva fasciata and Valoniopsis pachynema. These two algae contain high amounts of phenolic compounds, which is believed to be the reason.

=== Parasitism ===
There is a lack of concrete evidence regarding parasitic relationships with plants, however studies have found such relationships with invertebrates. In the case of the octopus Eledone cirrhosa, there were found to be ulcerative lesions that could be contagious to other marine organisms. Thraustochytrids could not confidently be determined as the cause of these fatal lesions, with a suggestion being that they came into contact with octopuses after initial infection. Other discoveries of infections similar to what befell Eledone cirrhosa have been noted on oysters, farmed rainbow trout, squid gills, sponges, free living flat worms, cnidarians nudibranchs, and tunicates.

Examining cases of parasitic relationships between thraustochytrids and living organisms, the protist can be either the direct cause of disease to the host or an opportunistic parasite. It is unclear what allows for thraustochytrids to act as a pathogen, however, it appears to be a combination of environmental factors and there being an issue with the host organisms pathogenic defence mechanisms such as being unable to excrete any inhibitory materials.

=== Other biotic relationships ===
Studies have found significant amounts of thraustochytrids in the stomach contents and feces of Lytechinus variegatus, a sea urchin. This discovery could be due to either ingestion of detritus, containing thraustochytrids or it could potentially be a regular component of the sea urchin species' stomach. A species of thraustochytrid, Ulkenia visurgensis have also been found in healthy cnidarians in Indian tidal pools using immunofluorescence. Large amounts of the protist have also been discovered in the feces of the salp Pegea confoederata. These discoveries suggest that there is a relationship between thraustochytrids and the invertebrates mentioned, as well as potentially others in marine environments. Barnacle larvae were also found to survive and grow on substrates where thraustochytrids lived compared to surfaces without, potentially indicating a relationship between the two.

=== Role in marine food webs ===
Thraustochytrids play a large role in marine food webs with a significant contribution being in their synthesization of omega-3 polyunsaturated fatty acids (PUFAs): docosahexaenoic acid (DHA), and eicosapentaenoic acid (EPA) which are essential for marine crustaceans. Their main contributions of these fatty acids to the marine food chain occur in environments where they are able to thrive, usually in areas of high particular detritus in the water column. The PUFAs produced specifically enable growth and reproduction in the crustaceans. Bacteria do not synthesize significant amounts of PUFAs and zooplankton synthesis rates are usually less than 2% of what is required, suggesting that the main source of these fatty acids for them are found further down the food chain and are incorporated into their body from thraustochytrids they feed on. The synthesization of these fatty acids is also important for organisms at higher trophic levels.

== Physiology ==
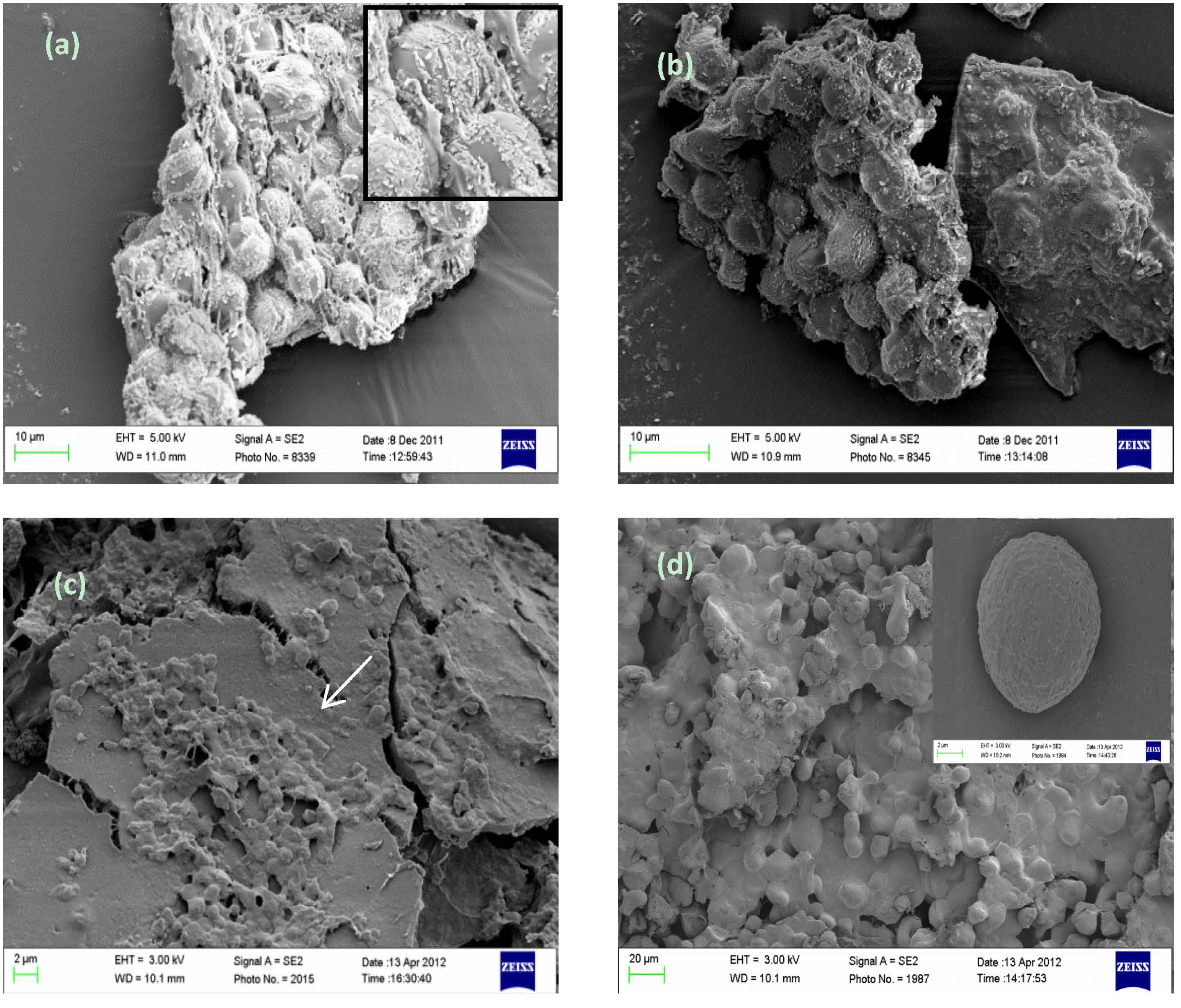
Thraustochytrid cells grown in different conditions.

Since thraustochytrids are obligate heterotrophic protists (non-photosynthetic microalgae), they obtain most of their resources for growth from decaying matter. To act as decomposers, thraustochytrids have evolved to encompass a wide variety of hydrolytic enzymes which include: amylases, proteases, phosphatases, cellulases, lipases, ureases, gelatinase, chitinase, and α-glucosidase. These hydrolytic enzymes are either deposited at the ECM or secreted to the surrounding solution. Ectoplasmic nets have the capacity to excrete hydrolytic enzymes (cellulases, amylases, lipases, phosphatases, and/or proteases) to digest organic material in the water, thus assuming the role of decomposition. In lab settings, the endoplasmic net of thraustochytrids has been shown the ability to penetrate the Pine pollen's sporopollenin, which is a highly microbial-resistant polymer. This experimental process is called pollen-baiting. Beyond decomposition, ectoplasmic nets also participate in providing adhesive function, as well as assimilation of digested organic material (absorption).

Thraustochytrids rely on a wide array of inorganic material for growth such as monopotassium phosphate, sodium chloride, and sodium sulfate. Absence of ions such as potassium can stunt thraustochytrid growth. More specifically, the absence of sodium ions could prevent the uptake of inorganic phosphate that is required for large scale growth conditions. In addition, some species of thraustochytrids can utilize urea as a nitrogen source for growth via a hydrolytic process, which ultimately yields carbon dioxide and ammonia.

In terms of organic carbon sources, thraustochytrids are capable of harnessing organic carbon compounds like maltose, fructose, sucrose, glucose, glycerol, and ethanol for energy expenditure and growth. In addition, vitamins such as thiamine, biotin, cobalamin, nicotinic acid, pantothenic acid, and riboflavin are utilized as well.

Hong Kong isolates of thraustochytrids species have displayed a wide range of pH for proper growth extending from 4 to 9, however, each individual species exhibited a different range of pH optima. In addition, these Hong Kong isolates tend grow within a temperature range of 20-25 °C, with salinity levels ranging around 7.5-30‰. However, just like the pH ranges, the optima range of temperature and salinity exhibited by each species differed from one another.

=== Major compounds synthesized ===
Roughly greater than 65% of fatty acids that constitute thraustochytrids' membranes stem from DHA (22:6) and palmitic acid (16:0). Through unestablished physiological means, thraustochytrids sustained in an environment lacking nitrogen will initiate the synthesis of lipids. It is believed that limitations induced by nitrogen deficiency within the medium can pause cell division, which causes a change in the carbon flux that is used to maintain membrane and protein synthesis and ultimately promotes the production of TAGs. In terms of overall lipid composition, neutral lipids which are mainly constituted of TAGs make up a large portion of glycerolipid distribution relative to polar lipids.

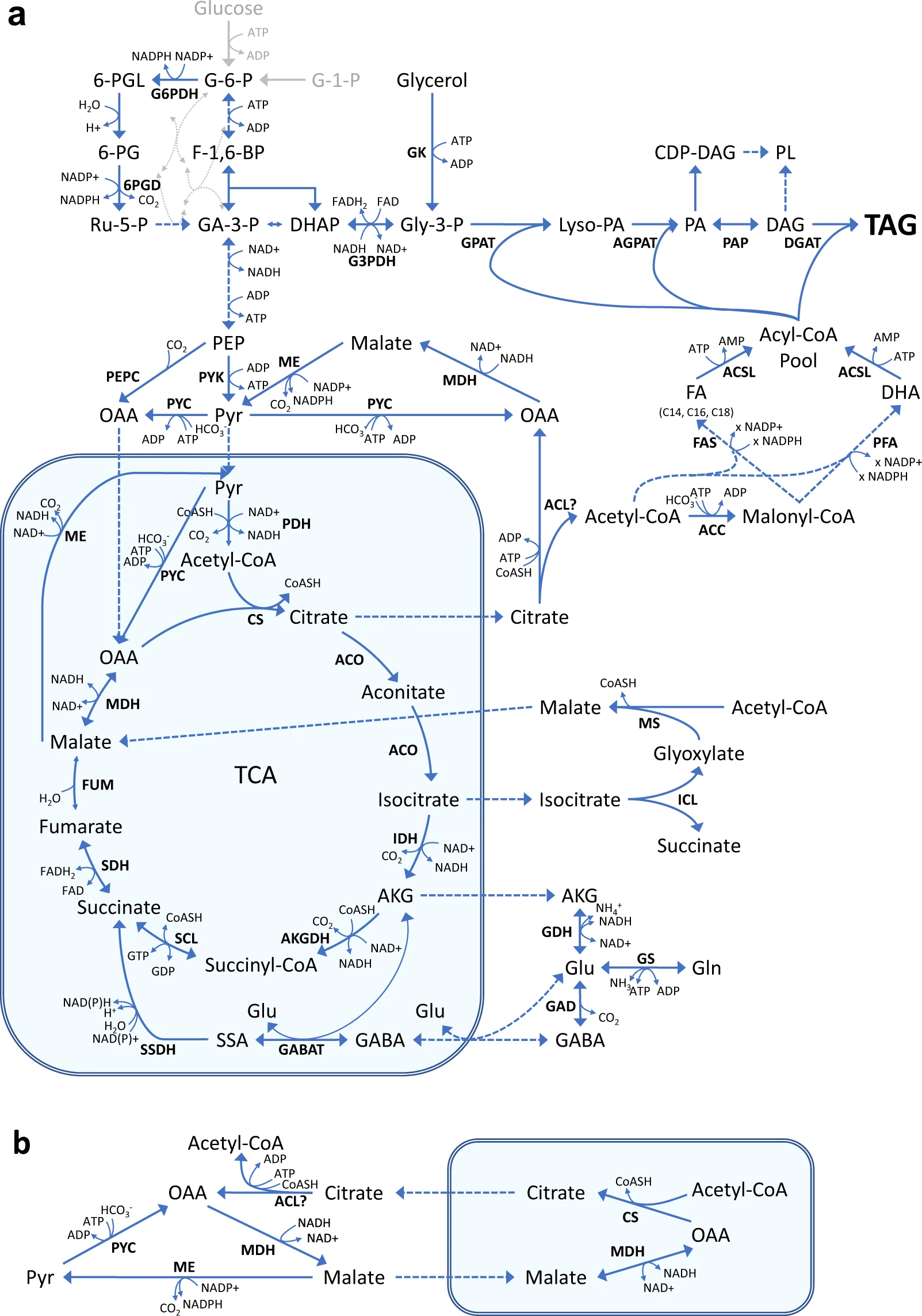
Diagram of fatty acid synthesis metabolic pathways in Aurantiochytrium sp.

.

==== Saturated fatty acids and polyunsaturated fatty acids ====
The production of saturated fatty acids and polyunsaturated fatty acids takes place via two pathways which require a type I Fatty Acid Synthase (FAS) construct and a Polyketide Synthase-like (PKS-like) machinery (a.k.a. PUFA synthase), respectively. FAS gives rise to saturated fatty acids that are 16 carbons in length via an aerobic pathway. On the other hand, PUFA synthase gives rise to unsaturated fatty acids that are 20 and 22 carbons in length via an anaerobic pathway. FAS typically produces an abundance of palmitic acid (16:0), while PUFA synthase typically produces an abundance of DHA (22:6). It is not certain as to why two different pathways are needed for fatty acid synthesis, but studies have shown that auxotrophic thraustochytrids are a direct result of mutations to the PUFA synthase, thus indicating that the two pathways are not redundant and are independent of one another. It has been reported that if the DH/I domain of PUFA synthase's subunit C is mutated, it will lead to a decrease of greater than 50% to the overall yield of PUFA, thus, indicating its importance to the synthetic pathway and possible exploitation.

==== Synthesis of DHA ====
Acetyl-CoA first attaches to KS releasing CoA-SH, then MAT adds a malonyl group to ACP while releasing CoA-SH as a byproduct. KS condenses the activated acetyl with the malonyl group to produce acetoacetyl-CoA, releasing CO_{2} as a byproduct. KR then reduces acetoacetyl-CoA via NADPH + H^{+} and the subsequent product is dehydrated via a DH or DH/I dehydratase to produce an acyl chain with a 2-trans double bond (trans-∆^{2}-butenoyl-ACP). The 2-trans double bond may then be reduced via ER utilizing NADPH + H^{+} (FAS pathway continuation) or isomerized via DH/I leading to a 2,3 or 2,2 trans-cis product (PUFA synthase pathway continuation). The cycle may repeat several times with the addition of two more carbons via either pathway to yield an elongated fatty acid or a precursor to PUFA 22:6 (DHA) through CLF (chain length factor) domain processing. It has been reported that the type of DH dehydratase utilized dictates the process towards PUFA 22:6 (DHA) synthesis, which is ultimately determined via the length of an already growing acyl chain.

==== Synthesis of sterols and carotenoids ====
To form mevalonate (a precursor to sterols and carotenoids), two acetyl-CoAs combine to form acetoacetyl-CoA, then another acetyl-CoA is added to form HMG-CoA. With the utilization of two NADPH + H^{+}, mevalonate forms. Mevalonate then undergoes three series of reactions with one ATP dedicated to each to form mevalonate-5-PP. Mevalonate-5-PP then loses CO_{2} and P_{i} to from ∆^{3}-isopentenyl pyrophosphate, which can isomerize to dimethylallyl pyrophosphate. With the addition of both these components in a head-to-tail condensation, geranyl pyrophosphate can either lead to the synthesis of carotenoids and or sterols via their intermediary product – farnesyl pyrophosphate. Continuing towards sterols, geranyl pyrophosphate with ∆^{3}-isopentenyl pyrophosphate in a head-to-tail condensation will lead to the production of farnesyl pyrophosphate. Farnesyl pyrophosphate then combines with another farnesyl pyrophosphate via utilization of NADPH + H^{+} to produce squalene (via squalene synthase) – the major precursor to sterol synthesis.

== Applications ==
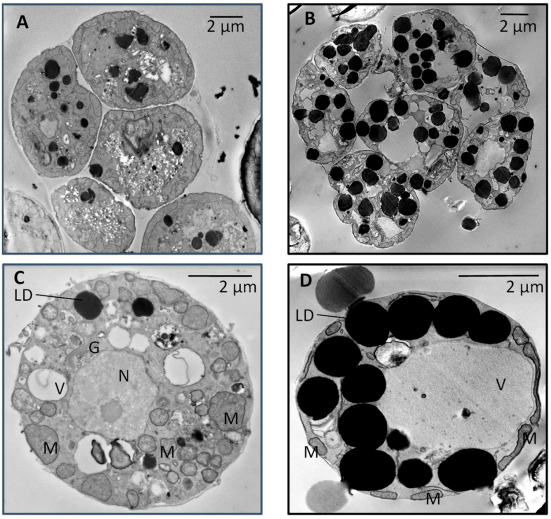
Scanning transmission electron microscope images displaying thraustochytrid cells as wild type (A and C) or mutant (B and D) for lipid accumulation. Oil drops are depicted in black.

Thraustochytrids produce docosahexaenoic acid (DHA), and when cultivated under certain conditions, some thraustochytrids can have their total weight composed of 15-25% DHA. DHA has been reported to have many benefits such as decreasing the onset of depression, having anti-inflammatory properties, decreasing the onset of memory loss via proper neuronal cell development (especially in infants), and many more. Thraustochytrids are also capable of producing carotenoids and sterols, which have been linked to decreasing diseases such as coronary heart disease, cancer, and osteoporosis. Furthermore, squalene can be extracted from thraustochytrids, which has benefits linked to activating non-specific immune responses, cancer remedies, UV ionization cell damage reduction, and the capability of acting as an exogenous antioxidant.

=== Potential uses ===
Thraustochytrids have the potential to overturn exploitation of fish stocks as a new form of sustainable commercial oil producers, while also minimizing losses caused by toxic environmental exposures. This can be accomplished by depriving cells from nitrogen, therefore, triggering the production of DHA. More specifically, a two-stage fermentation protocol could be utilized to accomplish this task. Cells are first grown within a low C:N (high nitrogen content) ratio medium, and then replaced with a high C:N (low nitrogen content) ratio medium, which subsequently prompts an increase in both DHA and FAs yields. If a vast number of 15:0 fatty acids is desired, the low nitrogen medium could be supplied with a surplus of branched amino acids such as valine, isoleucine, leucine.

Squalene (a precursor to sterols) is used to improved human health as a drug delivery system, and a moisturizing agent which is typically derived from shark liver oil. With an increase in demand for squalene over time, sharks are faced with a major decline in population size. Thus, an incentive for a new form of squalene production was generated, and Aurantiochytrium seems to be a viable solution to this problem.

Scientists have genetically engineered several pathways to increase thraustochytrids' yield of beneficial products by creating mutants, overexpressing genes, and or introducing knock-ins. Some experiments had significant results such as producing a 1.5-3-fold increase in fatty acid production, a 2-9 fold increase in astaxanthin production, a 4 fold increase in EPA (20:5) production, and a 2.5-3 fold increase in DHA quantity. Recent data has shown that if Aurantiochytrium limacinum SR21 are kept at 50% dissolved oxygen levels within their growth medium, then large increases in both biomass and DHA levels are observed. Other studies and a patent have shown that light could be used to increase biomass, carotenoids, and DHA through either constant or discontinuous illumination using different wavelengths.

Addition of terbinafine hydrochloride and jasmonate to cultures containing certain thraustochytrids strains like Aurantiochytrium mangrovei FB3 and Schizochytrium mangrovei, respectively, have demonstrated an increase in squalene production which could be utilized for sterol synthesis. Supplementation of calcium and magnesium ions helped thraustochytrids strains Aurantiochytrium sp. DBTIOC-18 and Schizochytrium sp. DBTIOC-1 to grow under a highly concentrated glycerol medium which typically inhibits growth, and thus gave rise to greater biomass, fatty acid, and DHA production rates.

Extracellular lipases have also been induced in two thraustochytrids strains displaying optimal activity at basic pH, thus giving rise to potential detergent usage. Some scientists have also demonstrated that thraustochytrids could be used to make antigens to fight against influenza and other types of viruses. In addition, gene transfers into plant seeds have been successful, thus allowing for the overexpression of PUFA synthase. As a result, these seeds can have their oils isolated and extracted for possible downstream commercial sale.

The temperature and or seasons have been reported to alter the fatty acid composition of thraustochytrids isolated from India. Winter isolates depicted a large increase in DHA content which are useful towards nutraceutical applications, while summer isolates depicted a large increase in omega three fatty acids and compounds directly related to biodiesel formulation.

=== Industrial uses ===
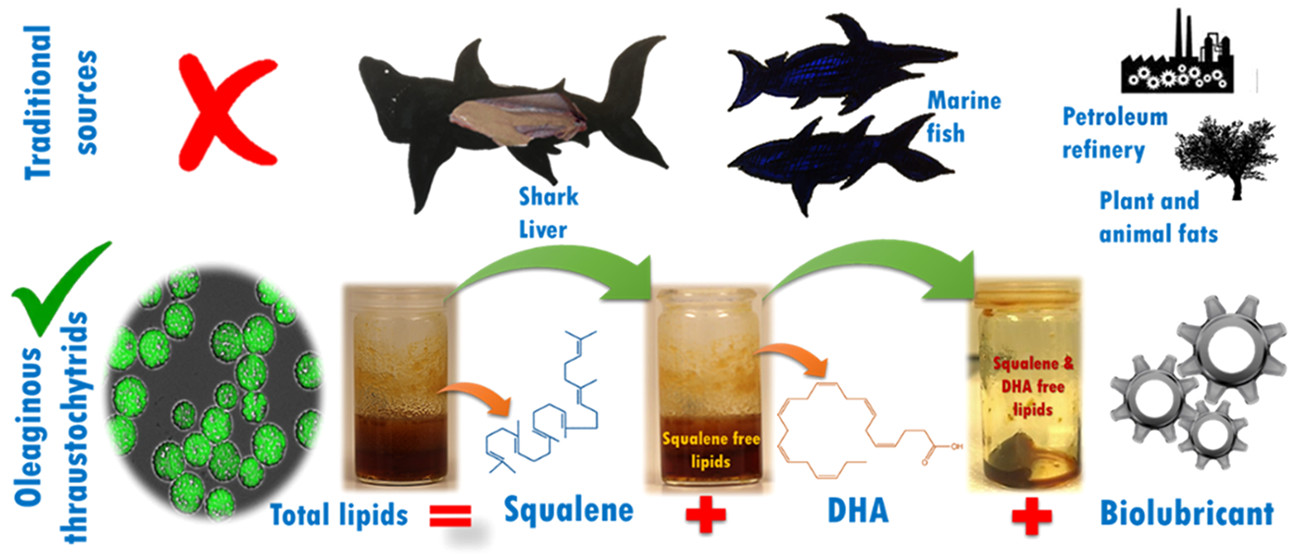
Thraustochytrids as an alternative to marine fish for dietary supplements.

Companies such as Royal DSM, Alltech, Martek Bioscience, and Ocean Nutrition Canada currently utilize thraustochytrids in some form to produce dietary supplements fit for human and animal consumption. Food products such as eggs, meat, milk, and baby formula are some of the many examples of products enriched with omega-3 fatty acids derived from thraustochytrids. Many of these products are certified as harmless towards human health by the FDA and European Commission.

Thraustochytrids oils have been used to feed aquaculture such as Atlantic salmon, juveniles of giant grouper, longfin yellowtail, catfish, and salmon parr. It been reported that rotifers are supplemented with polyunsaturated fatty acids using a schizochytrium strain, which are subsequently fed to finfish larvae. Studies have shown that commercial fish supplemented with DHA during the spawning season tend to grow faster and have greater survival rates with reduced abnormalities. Astaxanthin, a keto-carotenoid, derived from thraustochytrids have also been used to feed fish, chicken, and turkey, and to even dye food.

Thraustochytrids have also made some break throughs in the biofuel industry. Strains such as Schizochytrium sp. S31 and Schizochytrium mangrovei PQ6 have demonstrated good potential towards the production of certain fuel compounds like biodiesel. The Japanese have also developed a new strain of thraustochytrid, Aurantiochytrium 18 W13a, which is capable of producing squalene from sludge waste water. Using ruthenium/cerium oxide catalysis, squalene is then turned into small chain alkanes which can be subsequently used in the production of industrial and commercial fuel. Scientists have also engineered a new thraustochytrid strain (T18) that can feed on hemi-cellulosic waste generated from feedstocks, and thus produce useful lipids. This was accomplished via overexpressing heterologous xylulose kinase and endogenous xylose isomerase.

A European patent has also demonstrated the capability of oils sourced from thraustochytrids being used towards the creation of thermal insulators.
