= Protist locomotion =

Motion system of a type of eukaryotic organism

Protists are the eukaryotes that cannot be classified as plants, fungi or animals. They are mostly unicellular and microscopic. Many unicellular protists, particularly protozoans, are motile and can generate movement using flagella, cilia or pseudopods. Cells which use flagella for movement are usually referred to as flagellates, cells which use cilia are usually referred to as ciliates, and cells which use pseudopods are usually referred to as amoeba or amoeboids. Other protists are not motile, and consequently have no built-in movement mechanism.

== Overview ==
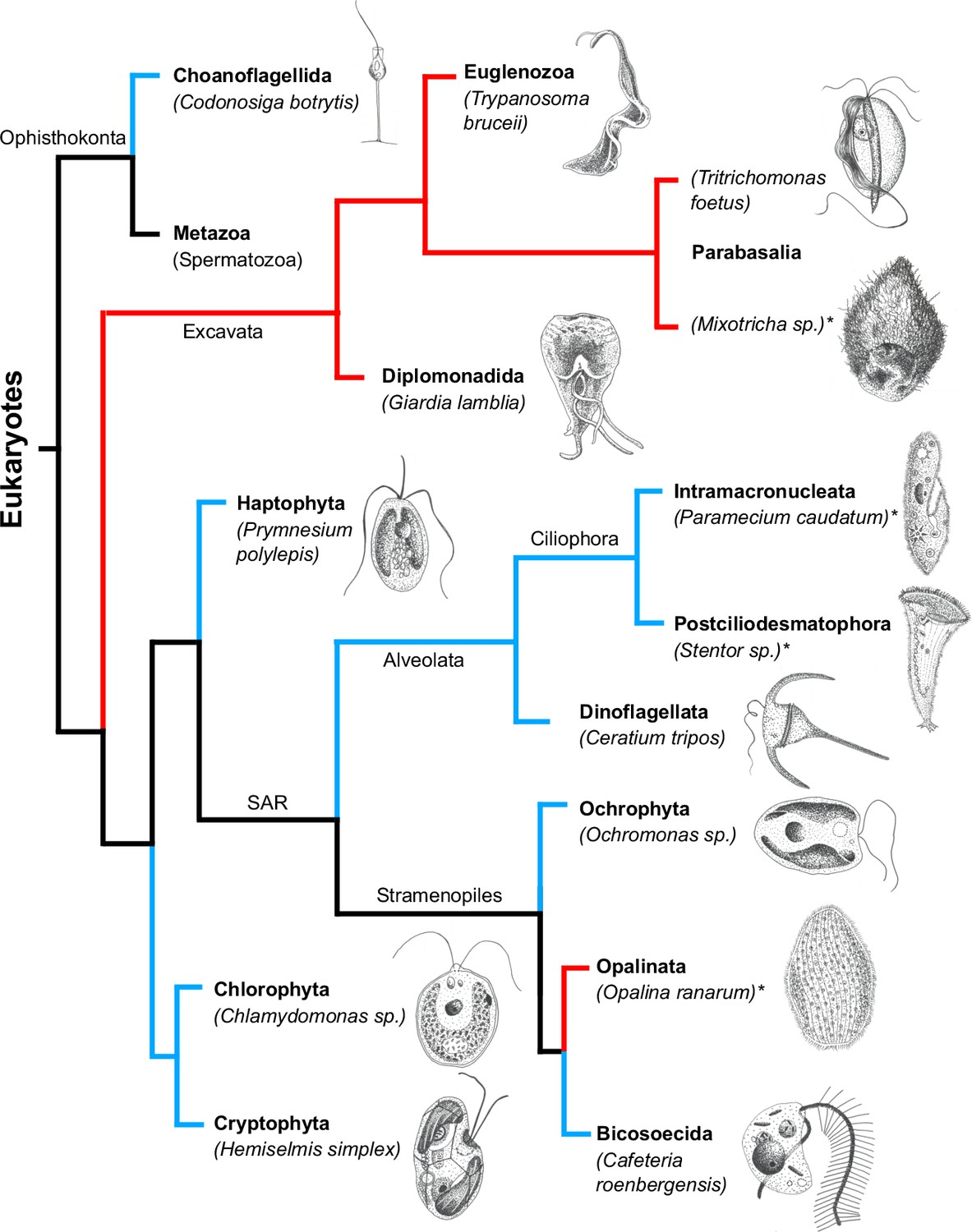
Some motile unicellular protists

Unicellular protists comprise a vast, diverse group of organisms that covers virtually all environments and habitats, displaying a menagerie of shapes and forms. Hundreds of species of the ciliate genus Paramecium or flagellated Euglena are found in marine, brackish, and freshwater reservoirs; the green algae Chlamydomonas is distributed in soil and fresh water world-wide; parasites from the genus Giardia colonize intestines of several vertebrate species. One of the shared features of these organisms is their motility, crucial for nutrient acquisition and avoidance of danger. In the process of evolution, single-celled organisms have developed in a variety of directions, and thus their rich morphology results in a large spectrum of swimming modes.

Many swimming protists actuate tail-like appendages called flagella or cilia in order to generate the required thrust. This is achieved by actively generating deformations along the flagellum, giving rise to a complex waveform. The flagellar axoneme itself is a bundle of nine pairs of microtubule doublets surrounding two central microtubules, termed the 9+2 axoneme, and cross-linking dynein motors, powered by ATP hydrolysis, perform mechanical work by promoting the relative sliding of filaments, resulting in bending deformations.

Although protist flagella have a diversity of forms and functions, two large families, flagellates and ciliates, can be distinguished by the shape and beating pattern of their flagella.

In the phylogenetic tree on the right, aquatic organisms (living in marine, brackish, or freshwater environments) have their branches drawn in blue while parasitic organisms have their branches drawn in red. Ciliates are indicated by an asterisk after their names. For each phylum marked in bold font, a representative organism has been sketched next to its name.

== Modes of locomotion ==
Protists according to how they move
Type of protist		Movement mechanism	Description	Example	Other examples
Motile	Flagellates		A flagellum (Latin for whip) is a lash-like appendage that protrudes from the cell body of some protists (as well as some bacteria). Flagellates use from one to several flagella for locomotion and sometimes as feeding and sensory organelle.	Cryptophytes	All dinoflagellates and nanoflagellates (choanoflagellates, silicoflagellates, most green algae) (Other protists go through a phase as gametes when they have temporary flagellum – some radiolarians, foraminiferans and Apicomplexa)
Motile	Ciliates		A cilium (Latin for eyelash) is a tiny flagellum. Ciliates use multiple cilia, which can number in many hundreds, to power themselves through the water.	Paramecium bursaria click to see cilia	Foraminiferans, and some marine amoebae, ciliates and flagellates.
Motile	Amoebas (amoeboids)		Pseudopods (Greek for false feet) are lobe-like appendages which amoebas use to anchor to a solid surface and pull themselves forward. They can change their shape by extending and retracting these pseudopods.	Amoeba	Found in every major protist lineage. Amoeboid cells occur among the protozoans, but also in the algae and the fungi.
Not motile		none		Diatom	Coccolithophores, most diatoms, and non‐motile species of Phaeocystis Among protozoans the parasitic Apicomplexa are non‐motile.

== Flagellates ==
Difference of beating pattern of flagellum and cilium

Flagella are used in prokaryotes (archaea and bacteria) as well as protists. In addition, both flagella and cilia are widely used in eukaryotic cells (plant and animal) apart from protists.

The regular beat patterns of eukaryotic cilia and flagella generates motion on a cellular level. Examples range from the propulsion of single cells such as the swimming of spermatozoa to the transport of fluid along a stationary layer of cells such as in a respiratory tract. Though eukaryotic flagella and motile cilia are ultrastructurally identical, the beating pattern of the two organelles can be different. In the case of flagella, the motion is often planar and wave-like, whereas the motile cilia often perform a more complicated three-dimensional motion with a power and recovery stroke.

Eukaryotic flagella—those of animal, plant, and protist cells—are complex cellular projections that lash back and forth. Eukaryotic flagella are classed along with eukaryotic motile cilia as undulipodia to emphasize their distinctive wavy appendage role in cellular function or motility. Primary cilia are immotile, and are not undulipodia.

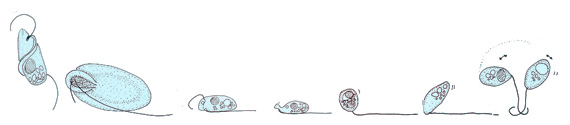
Marine flagellates from the genera (left to right) Cryptaulax, Abollifer, Bodo, Rhynchomonas, Kittoksia, Allas, and Metromonas

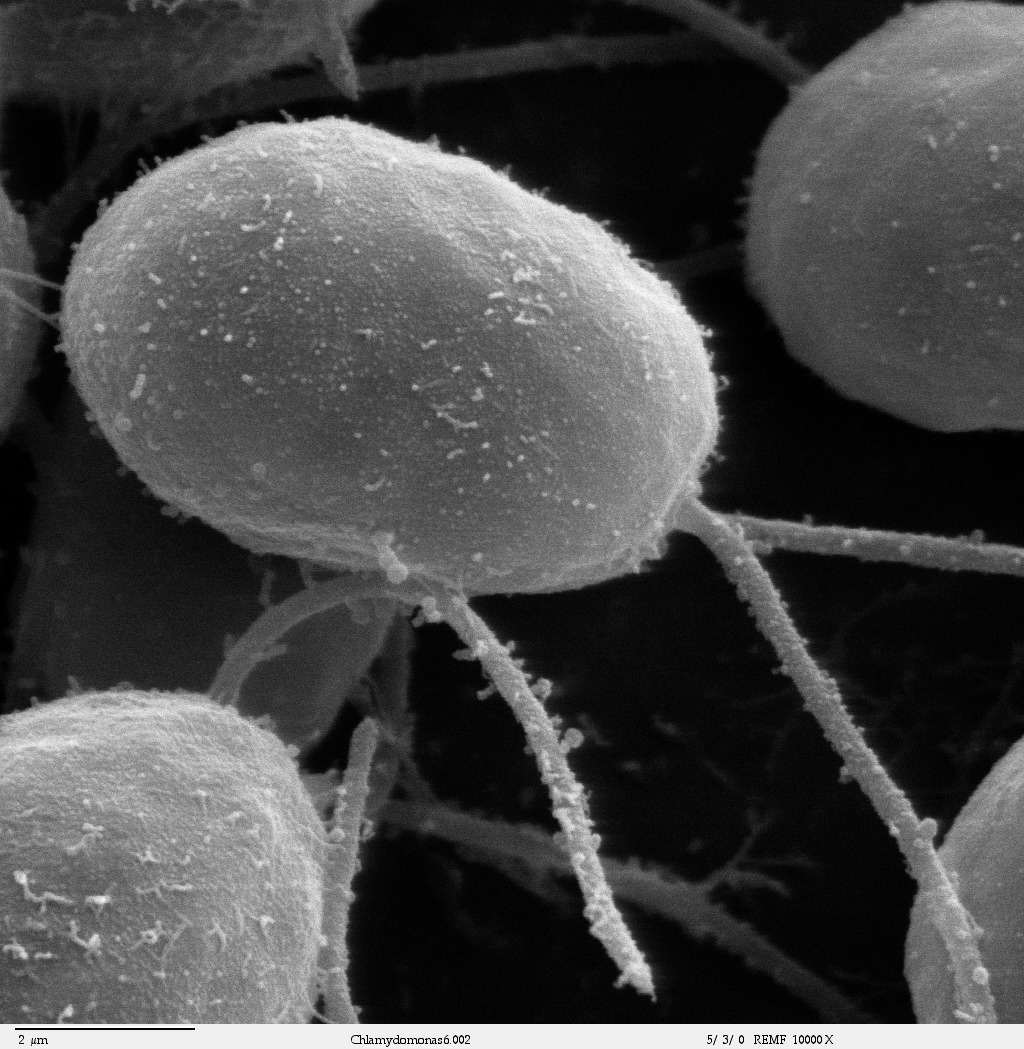
Freshwater green algal flagellate (Chlamydomonas)

Flagellates typically have a small number of long flagella distributed along the bodies, and they actuate them to generate thrust. The set of observed movement sequences includes planar undulatory waves and traveling helical waves, either from the base to the tip, or in the opposite direction. Flagella attached to the same body might follow different beating patterns, leading to a complex locomotion strategy that often relies also on the resistance the cell body poses to the fluid.

== Ciliates ==
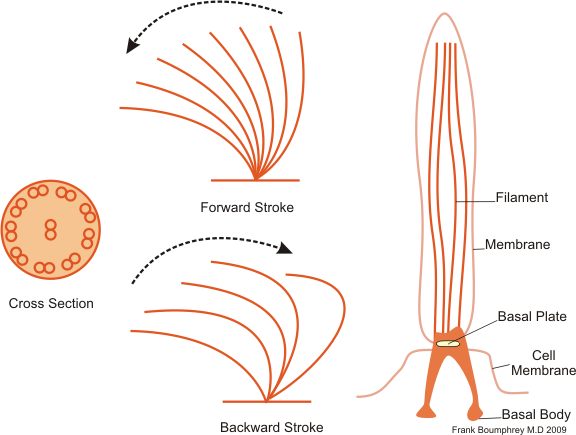
Cilia performs powerful forward strokes with a stiffened flagellum followed by relatively slow recovery movement with a relaxed flagellum

In contrast to flagellates, propulsion of ciliates derives from the motion of a layer of densely-packed and collectively-moving cilia, which are short hair-like flagella covering their bodies. The seminal review paper of Brennen and Winet (1977) lists a few examples from both groups, highlighting their shape, beat form, geometric characteristics and swimming properties. Cilia may also be used for transport of the surrounding fluid, and their cooperativity can lead to directed flow generation. In higher organisms this can be crucial for internal transport processes, as in cytoplasmic streaming within plant cells, or the transport of ova from the ovary to the uterus in female mammals.

Ciliates generally have hundreds to thousands of cilia that are densely packed together in arrays. Like the flagella, the cilia are powered by specialised molecular motors. An efficient forward stroke is made with a stiffened flagellum, followed by an inefficient backward stroke made with a relaxed flagellum. During movement, an individual cilium deforms as it uses the high-friction power strokes and the low-friction recovery strokes. Since there are multiple cilia packed together on an individual organism, they display collective behaviour in a metachronal rhythm. This means the deformation of one cilium is in phase with the deformation of its neighbor, causing deformation waves that propagate along the surface of the organism. These propagating waves of cilia are what allow the organism to use the cilia in a coordinated manner to move. A typical example of a ciliated microorganism is the Paramecium, a one-celled, ciliated protozoan covered by thousands of cilia. The cilia beating together allow the Paramecium to propel through the water at speeds of 500 micrometers per second.

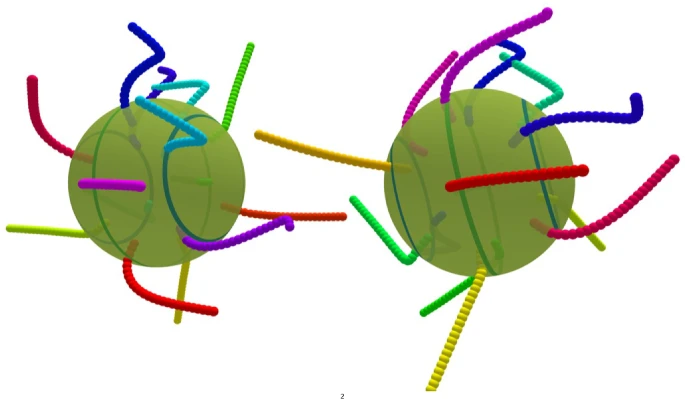
Cilia beating in a multi-ciliated microswimmer Two images at different times, one just after the other, showing different dispositions of the beating cilia. The varying cilium color indicates the instantaneous stage in the beat cycle. The motion of the swimmer is from left to right

Paramecium feeding on bacteria

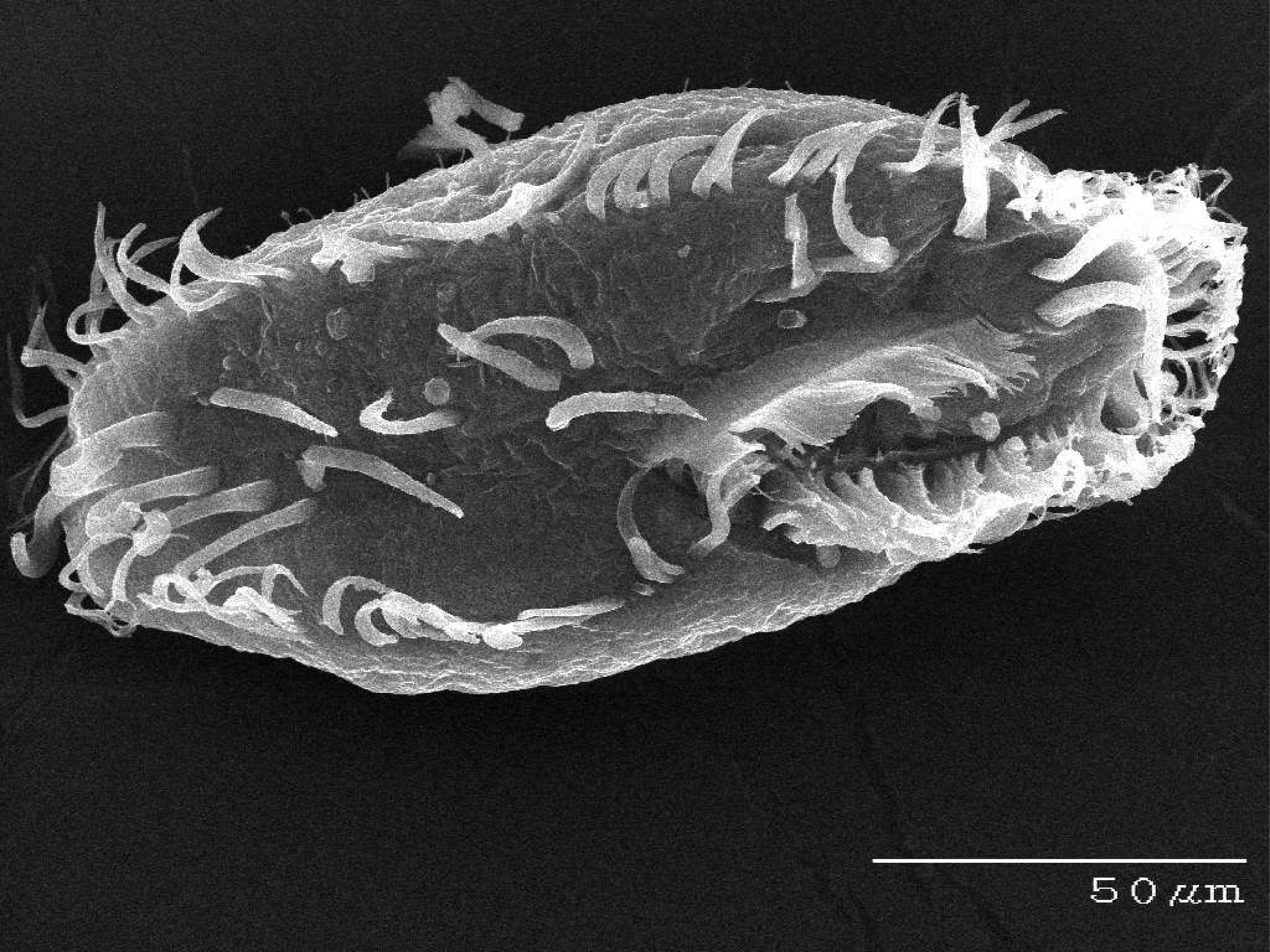
The ciliate Oxytricha trifallax with cilia clearly visible

Animation of swimming ciliate

External videos
- Paramecium: The white rat of ciliates
- Flinching saves lives in the microcosmos – Journey to the Microcosmos
- Microbes in slow motion – Journey to the Microcosmos

== Amoebas ==
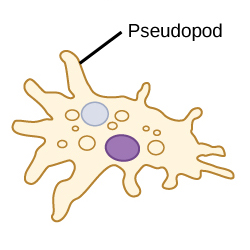
Locomotion by pseudopod

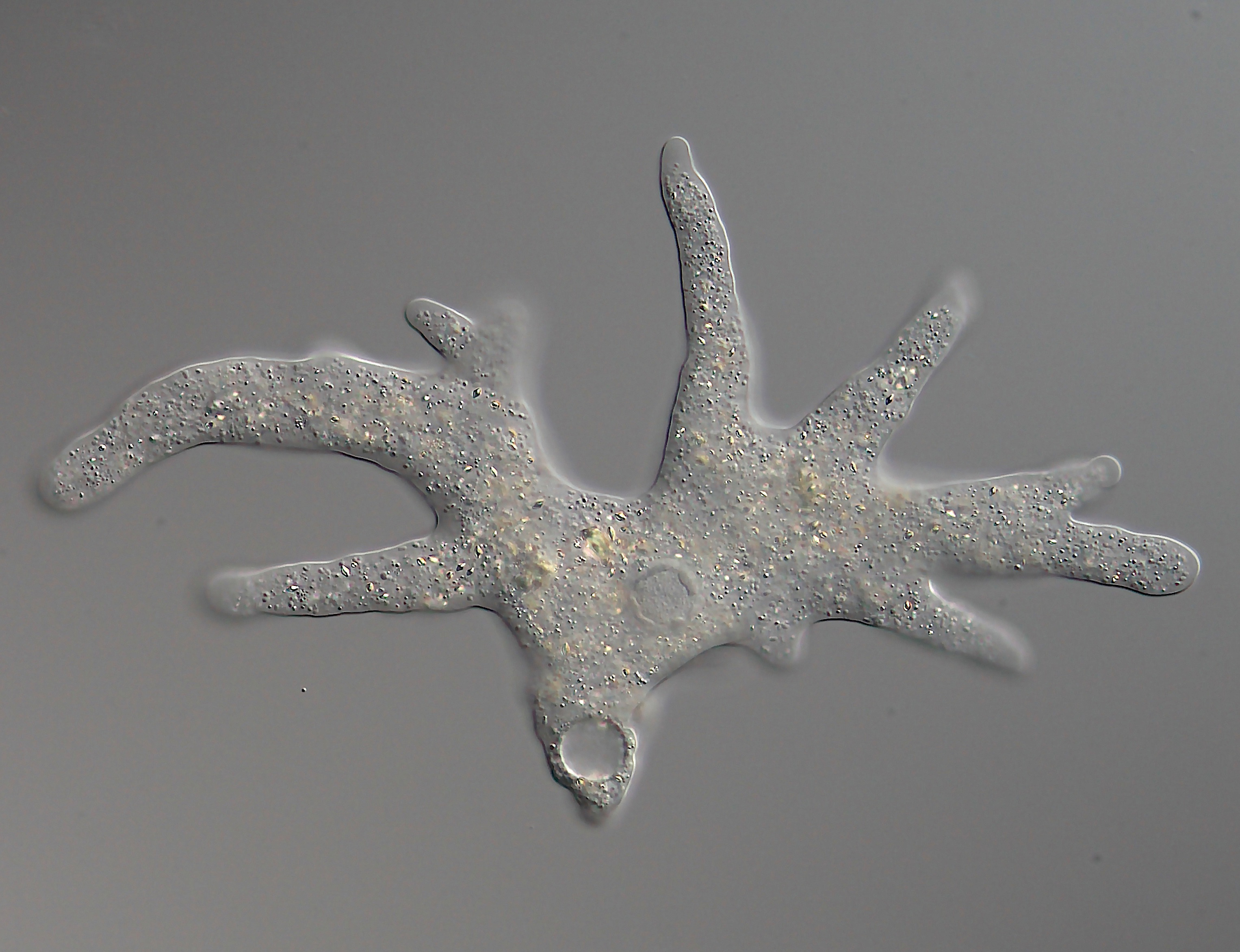
Amoeba proteus with many pseudopodia

The third prevalent forms of protist cell motility is actin-dependent cell migration. The evolution of flagellar-based swimming has been well studied, and strong evidence suggests a single evolutionary origin for the eukaryotic flagellum occurred before the diversification of modern eukaryotes. On the other hand, actin-dependent crawling uses many different molecular mechanisms, and the study of how these evolved is only just beginning.

== Colonial protists ==
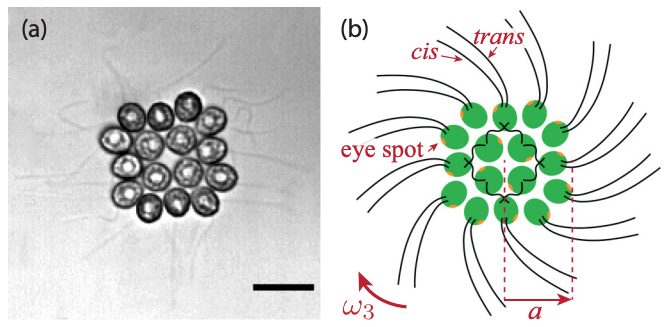
Geometry and locomotion of Gonium pectorale (a) Sixteen-cell colony. Each cell has two flagella, 30–40 μm long. Scale bar is 10 μm. (b) Schematic of a colony of radius a: sixteen cells (green) each with one eye spot (orange dot). The cis flagellum is closest to the eye spot, the trans flagellum is furthest. Flagella of the central cells beat in an opposing breaststroke, while the peripheral flagella beat in parallel. The pinwheel organization of the peripheral flagella leads to a left-handed body rotation at a rate ω3.

Gonium is a genus of colonial algae belonging to the family Volvocaceae. Typical colonies have 4 to 16 cells, all the same size, arranged in a flat plate, with no anterior-posterior differentiation. In a colony of 16 cells, four are in the center, and the other 12 are on the four sides, three each.

Since the work of August Weismann on germ-plasm theory in biology and of Julian Huxley on the nature of the individual in evolutionary theory, the various species of green algae belonging to the family Volvocaceae have been recognized as important ones in the study of evolutionary transitions from uni- to multicellular life. In a modern biological view, this significance arises from a number of specific features of these algae, including the fact that they are an extant family (obviating the need to study microfossils), are readily obtainable in nature, have been studied from a variety of perspectives (biochemical, developmental, genetic), and have had significant ecological studies. From a fluid dynamical perspective, their relatively large size and easy culturing conditions allow for precise studies of their motility, the flows they create with their flagella, and interactions between organisms, while their high degree of symmetry simplifies theoretical descriptions of those same phenomena.

As they are photosynthetic, the ability of these algae to execute phototaxis is central to their life. Because the lineage spans from unicellular to large colonial forms, it can be used to study the evolution of multicellular coordination of motility. Motility and phototaxis of motile green algae have been the subjects of an extensive literature in recent years, focusing primarily on the two extreme cases: unicellular Chlamydomonas and much larger Volvox, with species composed of 1000–50,000 cells. Chlamydomonas swims typically by actuation of its two flagella in a breast stroke, combining propulsion and slow body rotation. It possesses an eyespot, a small area highly sensitive to light, which triggers the two flagella differently. Those responses are adaptive, on a timescale matched to the rotational period of the cell body, and allow cells to scan the environment and swim toward light. Multicellular Volvox shows a higher level of complexity, with differentiation between interior germ cells and somatic cells dedicated to propulsion. Despite lacking a central nervous system to coordinate its cells, Volvox exhibits accurate phototaxis. This is also achieved by an adaptive response to changing light levels, with a response time tuned to the colony rotation period which creates a differential response between the light and dark sides of the spheroid.

In light of the above, a natural questions is as follows: How does the simplest differentiated organism achieve phototaxis? In the Volvocine lineage the species of interest is Gonium. This 8- or 16-cell colony represents one of the first steps to true multicellularity, presumed to have evolved from the unicellular common ancestor earlier than other Volvocine algae. It is also the first to show cell differentiation.

The 16-cell Gonium colony shown in the diagram on the right is organized into two concentric squares of respectively 4 and 12 cells, each biflagellated, held together by an extracellular matrix. All flagella point out on the same side: It exhibits a much lower symmetry than Volvox, lacking anterior-posterior symmetry. Yet it performs similar functions to its unicellular and large colonies counterparts as it mixes propulsion and body rotation and swims efficiently toward light. The flagellar organization of inner and peripheral cells deeply differs: Central cells are similar to Chlamydomonas, with the two flagella beating in an opposing breast stroke, and contribute mostly to the forward propulsion of the colony. Cells at the periphery, however, have flagella beating in parallel, in a fashion close to Volvox cells. This minimizes steric interactions and avoids flagella crossing each other. Moreover, these flagella are implanted with a slight angle and organized in a pinwheel fashion [see Fig. 1(b)]: Their beating induces a left-handed rotation of the colony, highlighted in Figs. 1(c) and 1(d) and in Supplemental Movie 1 [29]. Therefore, the flagella structure of Gonium reinforces its key position as intermediate in the evolution toward multicellularity and cell differentiation.

These small flat assemblies show intriguing swimming along helical trajectories—with their body plane almost normal to the swimming direction—that have attracted the attention of naturalists since the 18th century. Yet the way in which Gonium colonies bias their swimming toward the light remains unclear. Early microscopic observations have identified differential flagellar activity between the illuminated and the shaded sides of the colony as the source of phototactic reorientation. Yet a full fluid-dynamics description, quantitatively linking the flagellar response to light variations and the hydrodynamic forces and torques acting on the colony, is still lacking. From an evolutionary perspective, phototaxis in Gonium raises fundamental issues such as the extent to which the phototactic strategy of the unicellular ancestor is retained in the colonial form, how the phototactic flagella reaction adapted to the geometry and symmetry of the colony, and how it leads to effective reorientation.

== Protist taxis: Directed motion ==
=== Phototaxis ===
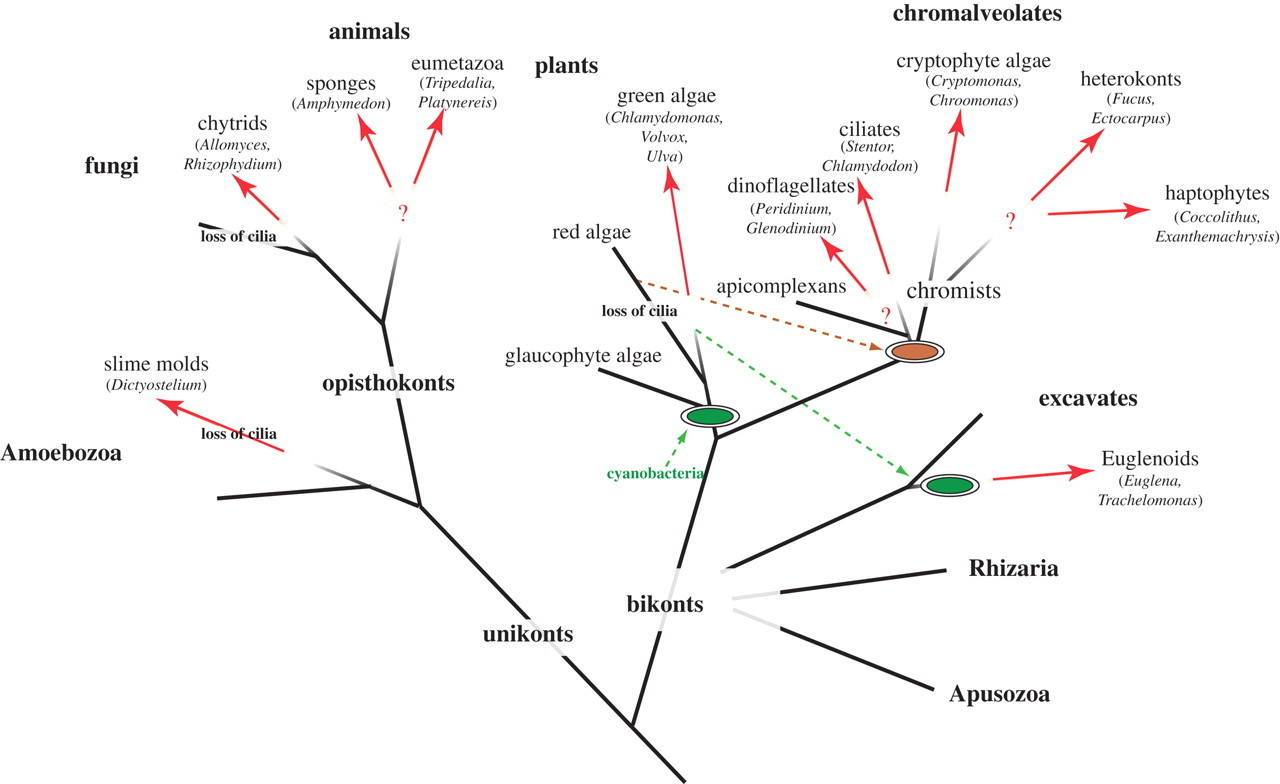
Distribution of three-dimensional phototaxis in the tree of eukaryotes Red arrows indicate the likely point of origin of phototaxis in a given group. Question marks indicate uncertainties regarding independent or common origin.

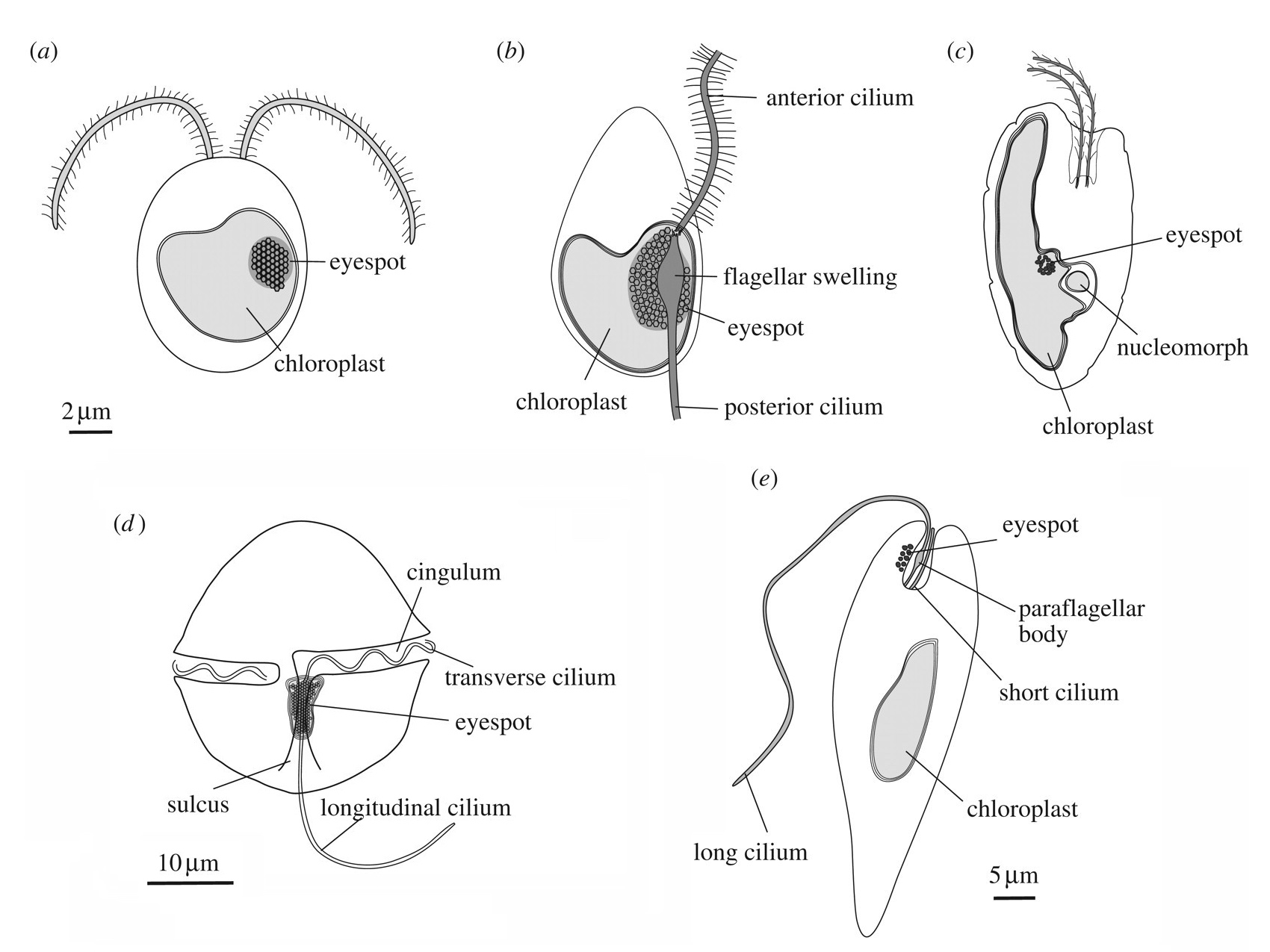
Diversity of phototactic protists (a) green alga (b) heterokont zoospore (c) cryptomonad alga (d) dinoflagellate (e) Euglena

Some protists can move toward or away from a stimulus, a movement referred to as taxis. For example, movement toward light, termed phototaxis, is accomplished by coupling their locomotion strategy with a light-sensing organ. Eukaryotes evolved for the first time in the history of life the ability to follow light direction in three dimensions in open water. The strategy of eukaryotic sensory integration, sensory processing and the speed and mechanics of tactic responses is fundamentally different from that found in prokaryotes.

Both single-celled and multi-cellular eukaryotic phototactic organisms have a fixed shape, are polarized, swim in a spiral and use cilia for swimming and phototactic steering. Signalling can happen via direct light-triggered ion currents, adenylyl cyclases or trimeric G-proteins. The photoreceptors used can also be very different (see below). However, signalling in all cases eventually modifies the beating activity of cilia. The mechanics of phototactic orientation is analogous in all eukaryotes. A photosensor with a restricted view angle rotates to scan the space and signals periodically to the cilia to alter their beating, which will change the direction of the helical swimming trajectory. Three-dimensional phototaxis can be found in five out of the six eukaryotic major groups (opisthokonts, Amoebozoa, plants, chromalveolates, excavates, rhizaria).

Pelagic phototaxis is present in green algae – it is not present in glaucophyte algae or red algae. Green algae have a "stigma" located in the outermost portion of the chloroplast, directly underneath the two chloroplast membranes. The stigma is made of tens to several hundreds of lipid globules, which often form hexagonal arrays and can be arranged in one or more rows. The lipid globules contain a complex mixture of carotenoid pigments, which provide the screening function and the orange-red colour, as well as proteins that stabilize the globules. The stigma is located laterally, in a fixed plane relative to the cilia, but not directly adjacent to the basal bodies. The fixed position is ensured by the attachment of the chloroplast to one of the ciliary roots. The pigmented stigma is not to be confused with the photoreceptor. The stigma only provides directional shading for the adjacent membrane-inserted photoreceptors (the term "eyespot" is therefore misleading). Stigmata can also reflect and focus light like a concave mirror, thereby enhancing sensitivity.

In the best-studied green alga, Chlamydomonas reinhardtii, phototaxis is mediated by a rhodopsin pigment, as first demonstrated by the restoration of normal photobehaviour in a blind mutant by analogues of the retinal chromophore. Two archaebacterial-type rhodopsins, channelrhodopsin-1 and -2, were identified as phototaxis receptors in Chlamydomonas. Both proteins have an N-terminal 7-transmembrane portion, similar to archaebacterial rhodopsins, followed by an approximately 400 residue C-terminal membrane-associated portion. CSRA and CSRB act as light-gated cation channels and trigger depolarizing photocurrents. CSRA was shown to localize to the stigma region using immunofluorescence analysis (Suzuki et al. 2003). Individual RNAi depletion of both CSRA and CSRB modified the light-induced currents and revealed that CSRA mediates a fast, high-saturating current while CSRB a slow, low-saturating one. Both currents are able to trigger photophobic responses and can have a role in phototaxis, although the exact contribution of the two receptors is not yet clear.

As in all bikonts (plants, chromalveolates, excavates, rhizaria), green algae have two cilia, which are not identical. The anterior cilium is always younger than the posterior one. In every cell cycle, one daughter cell receives the anterior cilium and transforms it into a posterior one. The other daughter inherits the posterior, mature cilium. Both daughters then grow a new anterior cilium.

As all other ciliary swimmers, green algae always swim in a spiral. The handedness of the spiral is robust and is guaranteed by the chirality of the cilia. The two cilia of green algae have different beat patterns and functions. In Chlamydomonas, the phototransduction cascade alters the stroke pattern and beating speed of the two cilia differentially in a complex pattern. This results in the reorientation of the helical swimming trajectory as long as the helical swimming axis is not aligned with the light vector.

=== Thermotaxis ===
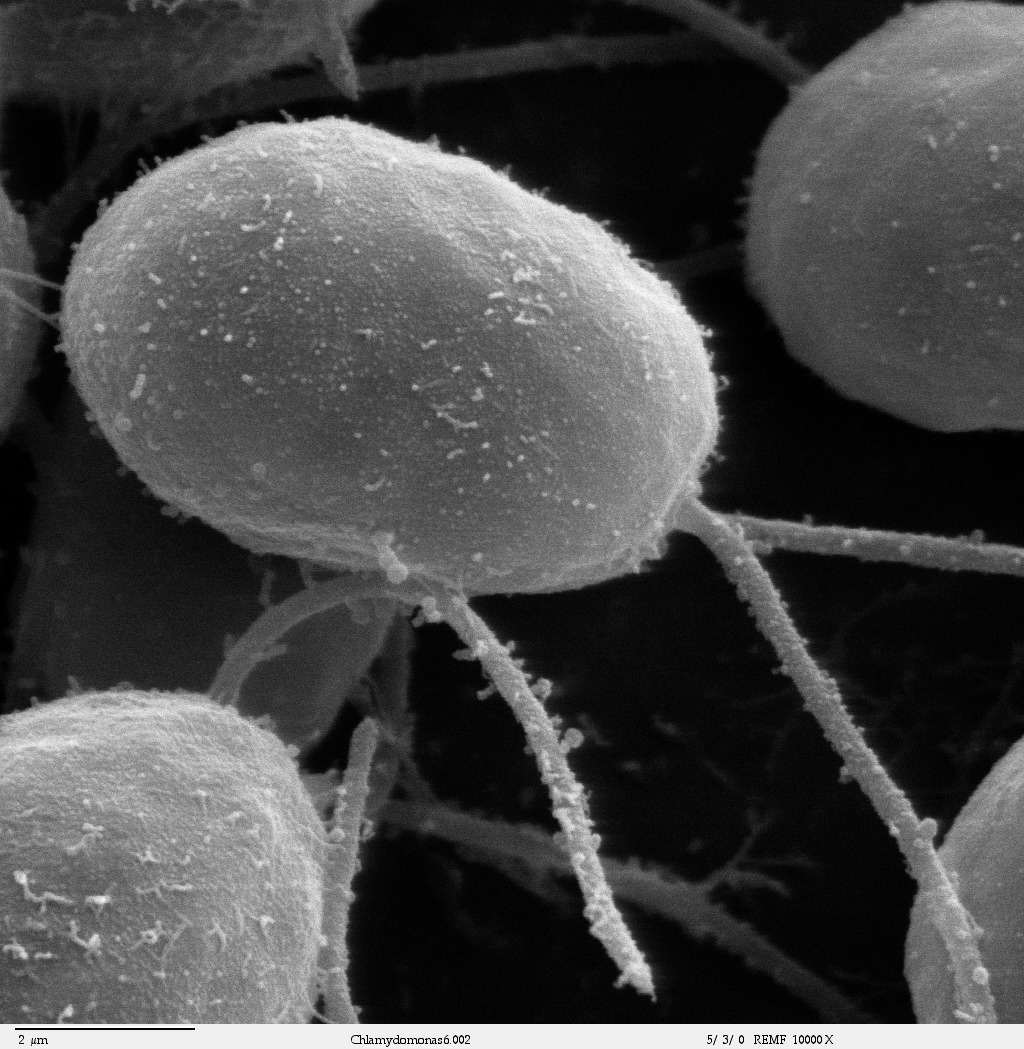
Chlamydomonas, a genus of unicellular green algae with two flagella each as long as the other, exhibit both phototaxis and thermotaxis.

Temperature is a key environmental factor for living organisms because chemical reaction rates and physical characteristics of biological materials can change substantially with temperature. Living organisms acclimate to cold and heat stress using acquired mechanisms, including the ability to migrate to an environment with temperatures suitable for inhabitation. One of the simplest forms of the behavior to migrate to a suitable thermal environment is thermotaxis. Thermotaxis has been found in multicellular organisms, such as Caenorhabditis elegans and Drosophila melanogaster, as well as in unicellular organisms, such as Paramecium caudatum, Dictyostelium discoideum, Physarum polycephalum, and Escherichia coli. Individual cells within multicellular organisms also show thermotaxis. For example, mammalian sperm migrate through the oviduct to the fertilization site guided by a rise in temperature.

The investigation of how unicellular organisms migrate toward preferred temperatures began more than 100 years ago. In particular, the thermotactic behavior of Paramecium cells has been well studied. Paramecium cells accumulate at sites that are close to the cultivation temperature, i. e. the temperature at which cells are grown. Accumulation at these sites occurs because cells frequently reverse their swimming direction when they encounter a temperature change that deviates from the cultivation temperature and increase their swimming velocity when they experience a temperature change that approaches the cultivation temperature. The reversal in swimming direction is induced by a depolarizing receptor potential, which triggers an action potential in the cilia. These studies on Paramecium cells highlighted the thermotaxis in unicellular organisms more than 30 years ago, but the molecular mechanisms for thermoreception and signal transduction are not yet understood.

The understanding of the molecular mechanisms for thermotaxis has progressed greatly in recent years, from investigations of mammalian sperm. Human sperm migrates toward warmer temperatures, ranging from 29 °C to 41 °C. Sperm can detect a temperature gradient as small as 0.014 °C/mm, suggesting that sperm detect temporal changes in temperature rather than spatial differences. Several molecules have been proposed to be sensor molecules, including opsin and transient receptor potential (TRP) channels such as TRPV1, TRPV4, and TRPM8. TRP channels are multimodal sensor for thermal, chemical and mechanical stimuli, but the function of opsins as a thermosensor awaits to be established.

Temperature is a critical environmental factor also for Chlamydomonas cells, which produce small heat shock proteins, chaperonins, and HSP70 heat shock proteins, and also undergo other heat shock responses to cope with heat stress. In response to a cold shock of 4 °C, cells halt proliferation and accumulate starch and sugar. Behavioral responses to avoid stressful warm or cold environments are expected to be present in Chlamydomonas. Although C. moewusii cells are reported to migrate toward warmer temperatures in a 10 °C to 15 °C gradient, there has been no report in which the temperature range was systematically manipulated to examine a relationship with cultivation temperature. A 2019 study demonstrated thermotaxis in Chlamydomonas reinhardtii, and found that between 10 °C and 30 °C Chlamydomonas cells migrated toward lower temperatures independent of cultivation temperature.

In contrast to thermotaxis, phototaxis has been extensively studied in Chlamydomonas. Two flagella of Chlamydomonas beat in a breast-stroke like pattern during forward swimming and, during phototaxis, Chlamydomonas cells make by a turn toward or away from a light source by controlling the balance of the propulsive forces generated by the two flagella. The balance depends on the intraflagellar calcium ion concentration; thus, loss of calcium-dependent control in ptx1 mutants results in a phototaxis defect. The direction of phototaxis in Chlamydomonas depends on the light intensity, but is also affected by intracellular reduction-oxidation (redox) conditions. Cells migrate toward a light source when the light intensity is weak, but the direction reverses under reducing conditions. In contrast, cells swim away from light sources with strong intensity, but the direction reverses under oxidizing conditions.

== Swimming speeds ==
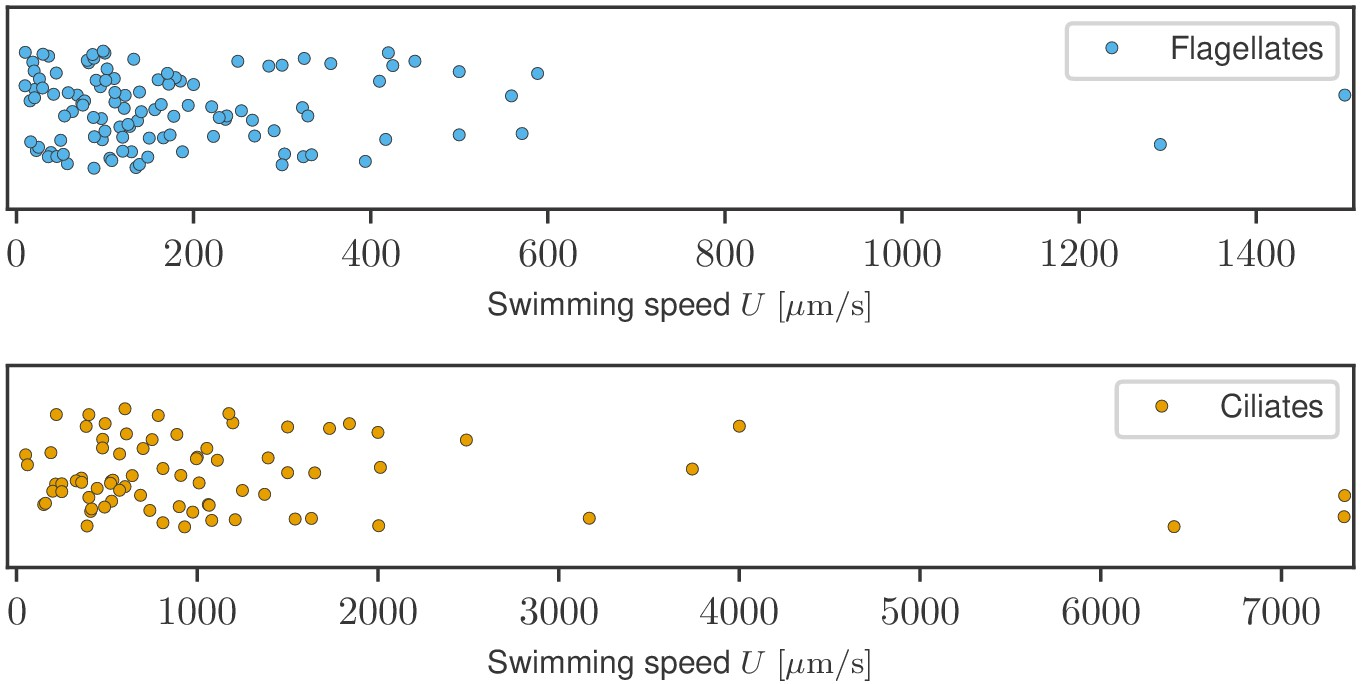
Swimming speeds of flagellates and ciliates Linear distribution of swimming speed data

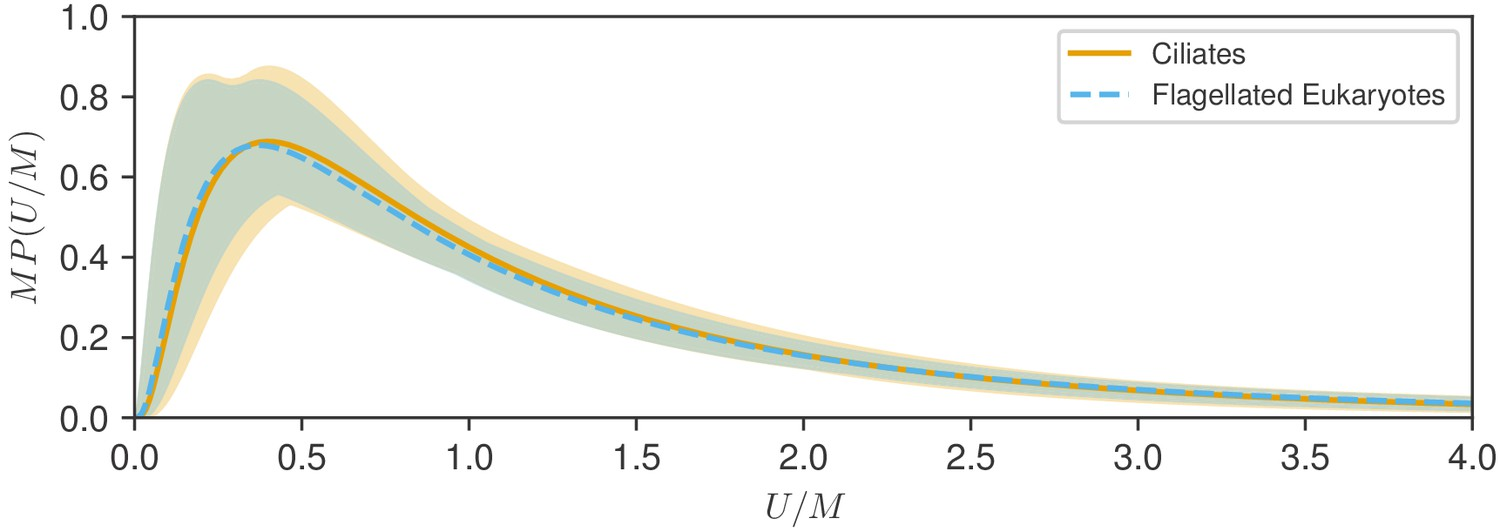
Fitted log-normal curves for flagellate and ciliate swimming speeds Swimming speeds were normalized by dividing them by their distribution median. The normalized distributions show remarkable similarity, both in the fitted curves and in the uncertainty of estimation.

== Escape response: Action potentials ==
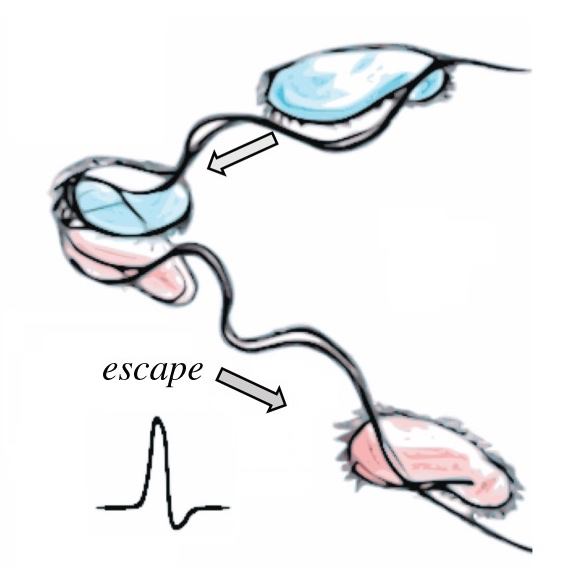
Fast ciliary reversal Ultrafast escape response and reversal of ciliary beating by action potential

In flagellate algae, abrupt changes in light intensity or intense photic stimuli induce rapid flagellar reversal and transient backward swimming. In green algae, this action may be mediated by the contractile root fibre which alters the angle between basal bodies. Cells can also react at speed to unexpected mechanical stimuli. All-or-none contractions in the stalked ciliate Vorticella can occur at rates of 8 cm/s. In some species of heliozoa, axopods can completely retract within 20 ms in order to draw in trapped prey for phagocytosis.

These fast reactions are usually induced by action potentials — unidirectional electrical pulses involving fast, regenerative changes in membrane potential. While all cells display some electrical activity, phylogenetic evidence suggests that the capacity to propagate action potentials may have been an ancestral eukaryotic trait supported by the last eukaryotic common ancestor. These may have emerged in response to accidental membrane damage and sudden calcium influx. Bioelectrical signalling in the form of action potentials occurs orders of magnitude faster than any other signalling modalities, e.g. chemical diffusion, protein phosphorylation etc.

In order to initiate fast escape responses, these may have been coupled directly to the motility apparatus—particularly to flexible, membrane-continuous structures such as cilia and pseudopodia. Loss of voltage-gated sodium/calcium channels is further correlated with loss of cilia in many taxa. In protists, all-or-none action potentials occur almost exclusively in association with ciliary membranes, with the exception of some non-ciliated diatoms. Graded potentials occur in amoebae, also for movement control.

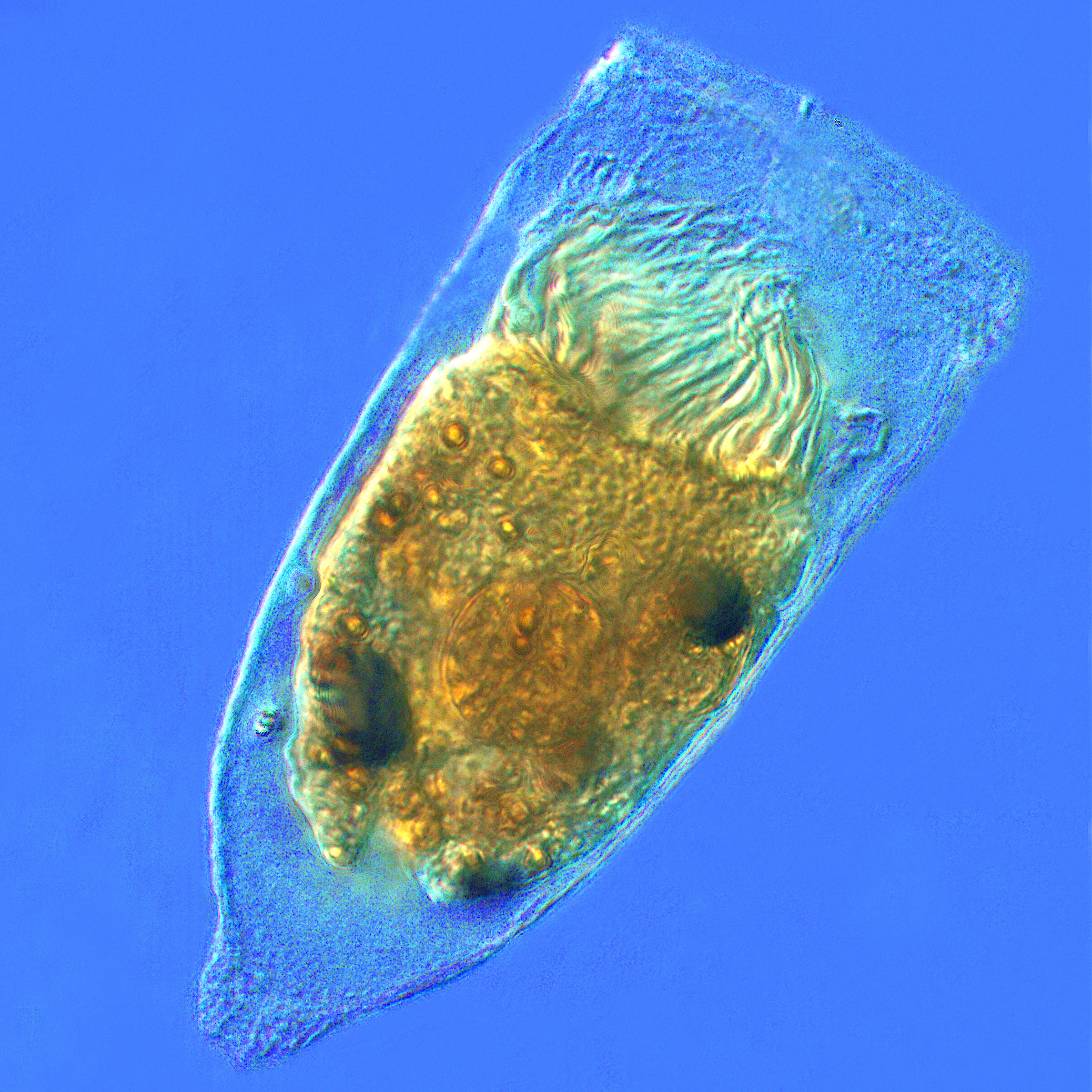
Tintinnid ciliate Favella

In Chlamydomonas, action-potential-like flagellar currents induce photophobic responses and flagella reversal (via the voltage-gated calcium channel Cav2), while photoreceptor currents elicit much milder responses. Here, a mechanosensory channel of the transient receptor potential family is localized to the ciliary base, while Cav2 is localized only to the distal regions of cilia. In Paramecium, hyperpolarizations increase ciliary beat frequency, while depolarizations have the opposite effect and eventually lead to a ciliary reversal. Depolarizations above a certain threshold result in action potentials, owing to opening of Cav channels located exclusively in the ciliary membrane. Potassium channels — also residing in the membrane — help restore the resting membrane potential.

Eukaryotes manipulate their membrane potential to achieve transitions between different behaviours. Complex bioelectric sequences have been recorded in association with integrated feeding and predation behaviours in Favella. Repetitive behaviours arise from rhythmic spiking. In ciliates, rhythmic depolarizations control fast and slow walking by tentacle-like compound cilia called cirri, enabling escape from dead ends and courtship rituals in conjugating gametes. In Stentor, action potentials produce whole-body contractions. Finally, excitable systems operating close to bifurcations may admit limit cycles, which manifest as repetitive or rhythmic electrical spiking and repetitive behaviours. Ultimately, this may lead to habituation.

== Biohybrid microswimmers ==
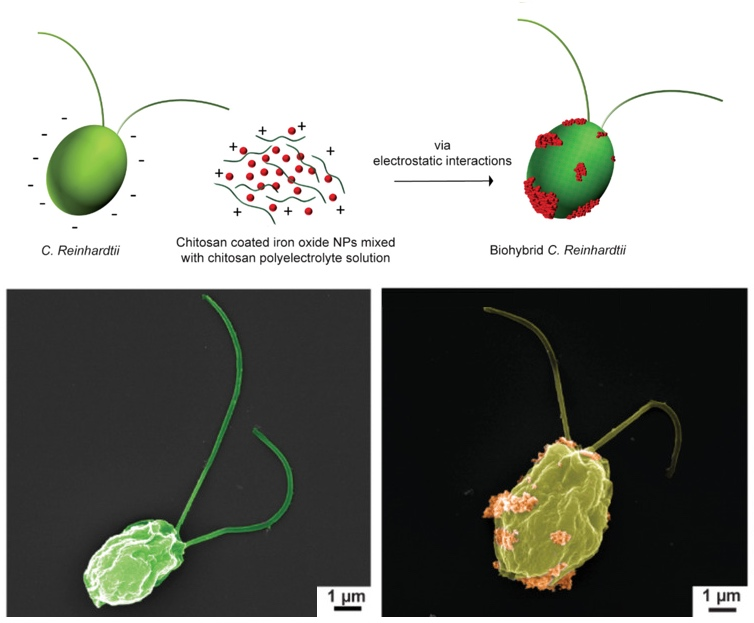
Biohybrid Chlamydomonas reinhardtii microswimmers Top: Schematics of production steps for biohybrid C. reinhardtii. Bottom: SEM images of bare microalgae (left) and biohybrid microalgae (right) coated with chitosan-coated iron oxide nanoparticles (CSIONPs). Images were pseudocolored. A darker green color on the right SEM image represents chitosan coating on microalgae cell wall. Orange-colored particles represents CSIONPs.

Biohybrid microswimmers can be defined as microswimmers that consist of both biological and artificial constituents, for instance, one or several living microorganisms attached to one or various synthetic parts. In 1999, Montemagno and Bachand published an article identifying specific attachment strategies of biological molecules to nanofabricated substrates, enabling the preparation of hybrid inorganic/organic nanoelectromechanical systems (NEMS). They described the production of large amounts of F1-ATPase from the thermophilic bacteria Bacillus PS3 for the preparation of F1-ATPase biomolecular motors immobilized on a nanoarray pattern of gold, copper or nickel produced by electron beam lithography. These proteins were attached to one micron microspheres tagged with a synthetic peptide. Consequently, they accomplished the preparation of a platform with chemically active sites and the development of biohybrid devices capable of converting energy of biomolecular motors into useful work.

Over the past decade, biohybrid microrobots, in which living mobile microorganisms are physically integrated with untethered artificial structures, have gained growing interest to enable the active locomotion and cargo delivery to a target destination. In addition to the motility, the intrinsic capabilities of sensing and eliciting an appropriate response to artificial and environmental changes make cell-based biohybrid microrobots appealing for transportation of cargo to the inaccessible cavities of the human body for local active delivery of diagnostic and therapeutic agents. Active locomotion, targeting and steering of concentrated therapeutic and diagnostic agents embedded in mobile microrobots to the site of action can overcome the existing challenges of conventional therapies. To this end, bacteria have been commonly used with attached beads and ghost cell bodies.

Chlamydomonas reinhardtii is a unicellular green microalga. The wild-type C. reinhardtii has a spherical shape that averages about 10 μm in diameter. This microorganism can perceive the visible light and be steered by it (i.e., phototaxis) with high swimming speeds in the range of 100–200 μm/s. It has natural autofluorescence that permits label-free fluorescent imaging. C. reinhardtii has been actively explored as the live component of biohybrid microrobots for the active delivery of therapeutics. They are biocompatible with healthy mammalian cells, leave no known toxins, mobile in the physiologically relevant media, and allow for surface modification to carry cargo on the cell wall. Alternative attachment strategies for C. reinhardtii have been proposed for the assembly through modifying the interacting surfaces by electrostatic interactions and covalent bonding.

== See also ==
- Aquatic locomotion
- Bacterial motility
- Cytoskeleton
- Spirostomum
- Squirmer
- Vorticella
