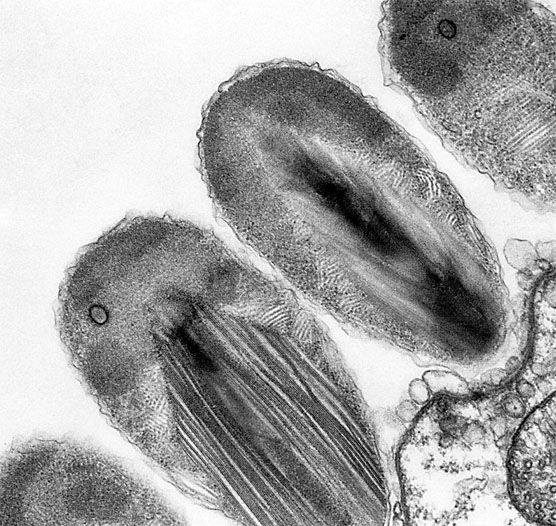
- Transmission electron micrograph of stage II epixenosomes.

Scientific classification (Candidatus)
- Domain: Bacteria
- Kingdom: Pseudomonadati
- Phylum: Verrucomicrobiota
- Class: Opitutia
- Order: Puniceicoccales
- Family: Puniceicoccaceae
- Genus: Epixenosoma; Bauer et al. 2005

Type species
- Ca. Epixenosoma ejectans Bauer et al. 2005

Species
- Ca. E. ejectans

= Epixenosomes =

Genus of bacteria

Epixenosomes, also known as Candidatus Epixenosoma, are a genus of bacteria in the phylum Verrucomicrobiota that form a symbiosis with marine ciliates of the genus Euplotidium, where they help to defend their ciliate hosts against predators. It is a monospecific genus, containing only the species Ca. Epixenosoma ejectans.

== Description ==
Epixenosomes possess two distinct developmental phases linked to the host cell cycle. Stage I epixenosomes are spherical, 0.5 μm in diameter and are surrounded by two membranes. They divide by direct binary fission. Stage II epixenosomes are egg-shaped (2.2 μm in length and 1 μm in width) and show complex organization with different cytoplasmic compartments, more complicated than the majority of prokaryotic organisms. They contain an extrusive apparatus within a proteinaceous matrix, although apparently not membrane-bound, which differs from the remaining cytoplasm. A functional cell compartmentalization has also been evidenced.

Their phylogenetic position was originally unclear, because they appeared to have both prokaryote-like traits, such as binary fission, and eukaryote-like traits, such as intracellular membranes. However, molecular phylogenetics showed that they are actually bacteria from the phylum Verrucomicrobiota.

== Defensive symbiosis with Euplotidium ==
Epixenosomes live on the dorsal surface of their hosts, marine ciliates in the genus Euplotidium. The name "epixenosomes" comes from the ancient Greek επι ξενον σομα, meaning "external alien body", referring to their extracellular position on the host. The extrusive apparatus ejects its contents when triggered; this process helps to defend the ciliate host against predators. Although Euplotidium can grow and reproduce without epixenosomes, those with epixenosomes have much higher survival when exposed to predators such as the ciliate Litonotus.

External signals of unknown origin are detected by the membrane receptors located at the top of the organism. The consequent activation of the adenylate cyclase-cAMP system triggers the ejection of the extrusive apparatus, with the formation of a hollow tube, about 40 μm long, terminating in a head mainly consisting of the apical portion of the epixenosome (the region containing DNA).

The extrusive apparatus is surrounded by a basket of tubules. Experiments with antitubulin drugs and immunocytochemical analyses at the optical and electron microscopical level suggested that these tubules consist of tubulin, which is a eukaryotic protein. Although some free-living Verrucomicrobiota are reported to have tubulin genes, they have not been found to have tubular structures like those of epixenosomes.

== See also ==
- R bodies
- Kappa organism
- Extrusome - organelles in some protists that have a similar function as epixenosomes
