= R bodies =

Polymeric protein inclusions

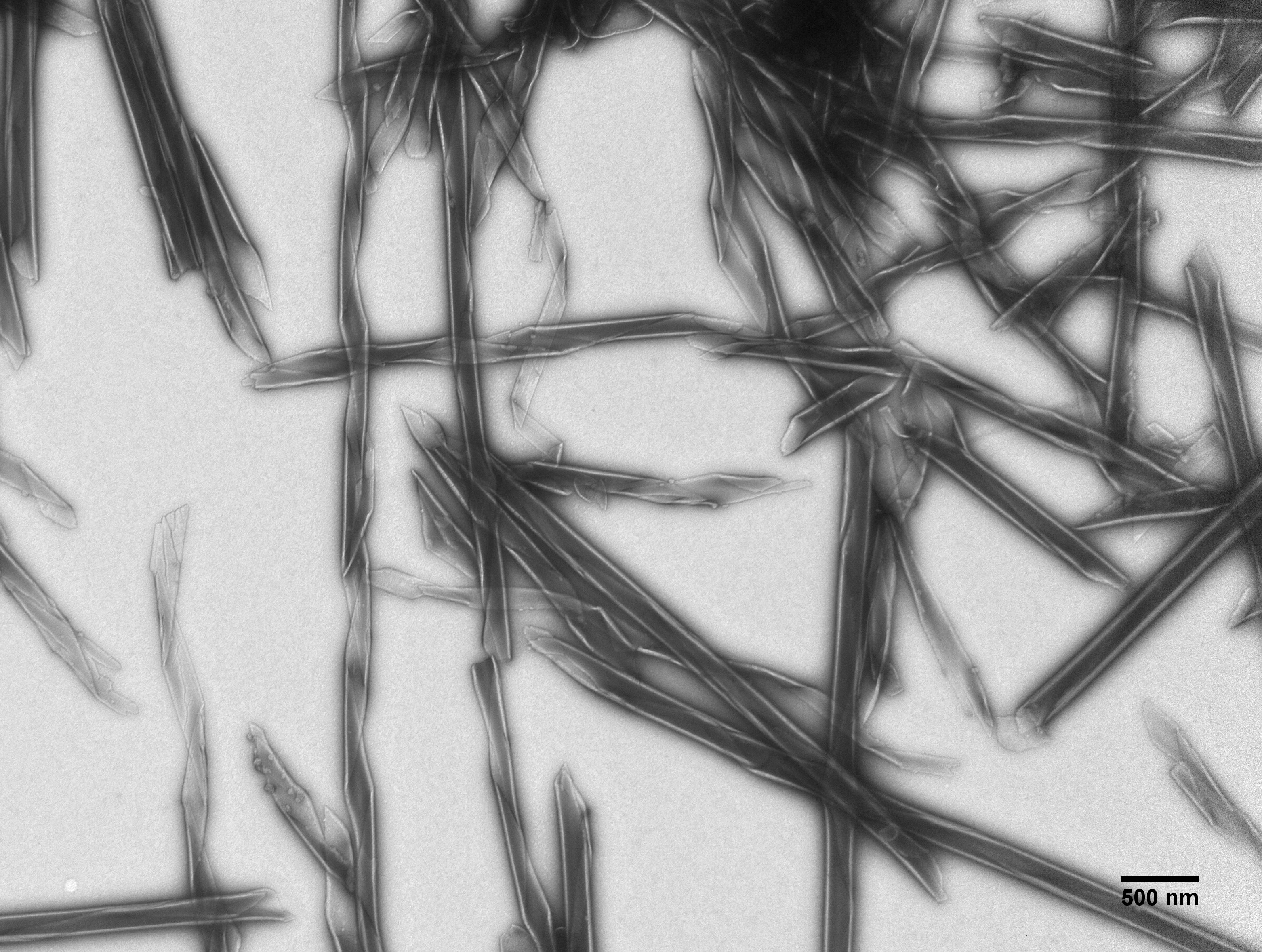
Jessica Polka's electron micrograph of negatively stained purified type 51 R bodies in their extended (low pH) state

R bodies (from refractile bodies, also R-bodies) are polymeric protein inclusions formed inside the cytoplasm of bacteria. Initially discovered in kappa particles, bacterial endosymbionts of the ciliate Paramecium, R bodies (and genes encoding them) have since been discovered in a variety of taxa.

== Morphology, assembly, and extension ==
At neutral pH, type 51 R bodies resemble a coil of ribbon approximately 500 nm in diameter and approximately 400 nm deep. Encoded by a single operon containing four open reading frames, R bodies are formed from two small structural proteins, RebA and RebB. A third protein, RebC, is required for the covalent assembly of these two structural proteins into higher-molecular weight products, visualized as a ladder on an SDS-PAGE gel.

At low pH, Type 51 R bodies undergo a dramatic structural rearrangement. Much like a paper yo-yo, the ribbon extends (from the center) to form hollow tube with pointed ends that can reach up to 20μm in length.

Other types of R bodies from different bacterial species vary in their size, ribbon morphology, and triggers for extension.

== Function ==
When kappa particles shed from a killer paramecium are ingested, R bodies extend within the acidic food vacuole of the predatory paramecium, distending and rupturing the membrane. This liberates the contents of the food vacuole into the cytoplasm of the paramecium. While feeding kappa particles to sensitive paramecium results in the death of paramecium, feeding purified R bodies or R bodies recombinantly expressed in E. coli is not toxic. Thus, R bodies are thought to function as a toxin delivery system.

R bodies are also capable of rupturing E. coli spheroplasts, demonstrating that they can rupture membranes in a foreign context, and they can be engineered to extend at a variety of different pH levels.
