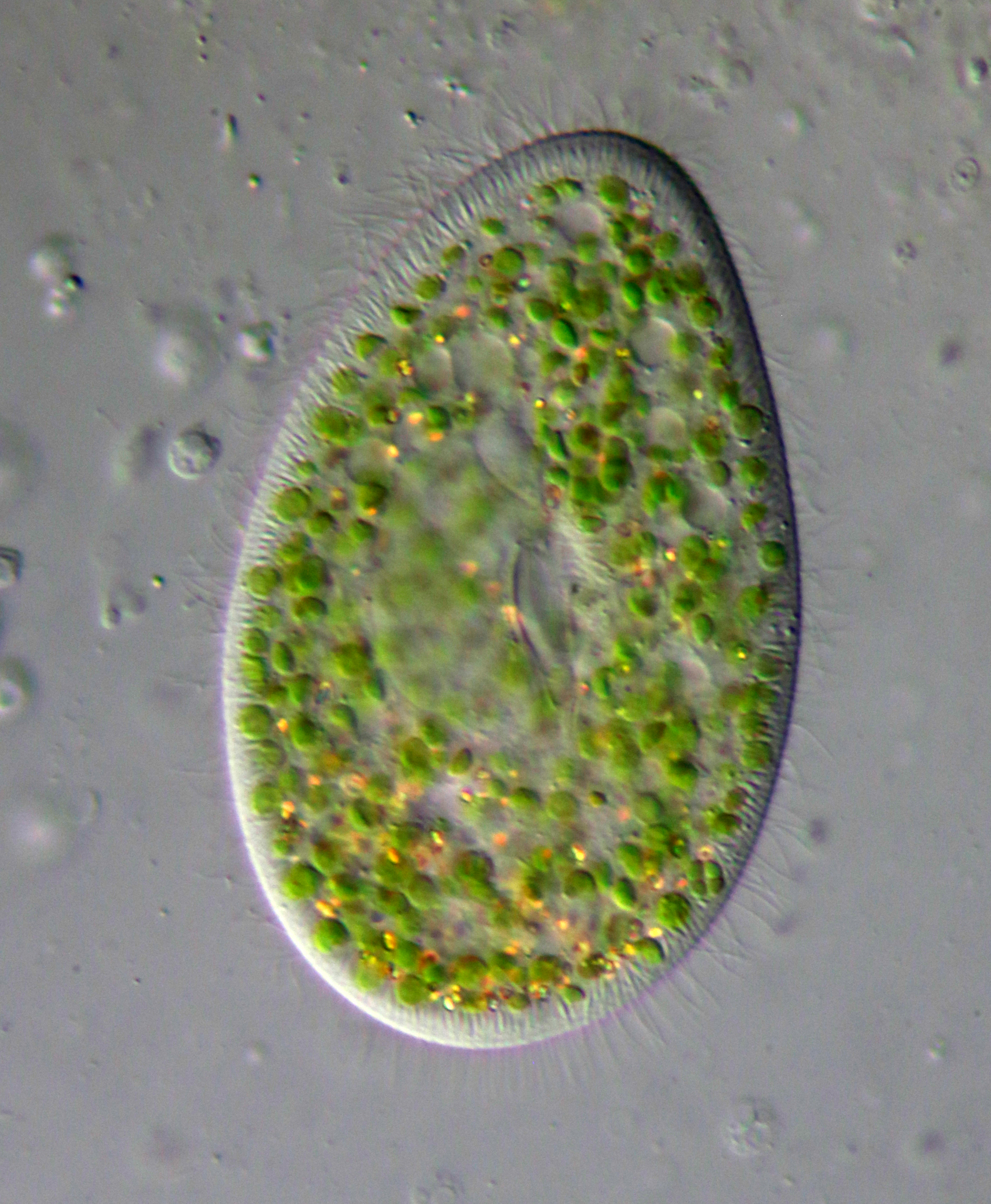

Scientific classification
- Domain: Eukaryota
- Clade: Sar
- Clade: Alveolata
- Phylum: Ciliophora
- Class: Oligohymenophorea
- Order: Peniculida
- Family: Parameciidae
- Genus: Paramecium
- Species: P. bursaria

Binomial name
- Paramecium bursaria (Ehr., 1831)

= Paramecium bursaria =

Species of single-celled organism

Paramecium bursaria is a species of ciliate found in marine and brackish waters. It has a mutualistic endosymbiotic relationship with green algae called Zoochlorella. About 700 Chlorella cells live inside the protist's cytoplasm and provide it with food, while the Paramecium provides the algae with movement and protection. P. bursaria is 80–150 μm long, with a wide oral groove, two contractile vacuoles, and a single micronucleus as well as a single macronucleus. P. bursaria is the only species of Paramecium that forms symbiotic relationships with algae, and it is often used in biology classrooms both as an example of a protozoan and also as an example of symbiosis.

A transcriptome sequence is determined.

== Genome ==
Moreover, a combination of long-read sequencing (PacBio) and short-read sequencing (Illumina) can be used to assemble a high-quality, near-complete macronuclear genome of P. bursaria, providing insights into the mechanism of endosymbiosis. The genome size of P. bursaria is much smaller than that of other ciliate species but is comparable to P. caudatum.

Additionally, the standard core genes in the assembled genome of P. bursaria (94.8%) are similar to those of other well-studied ciliate genomes, such as T. thermophila (89.9%), O. trifallax (93.1%), and P. tetraurelia (92.7%).

== Endosymbiosis ==
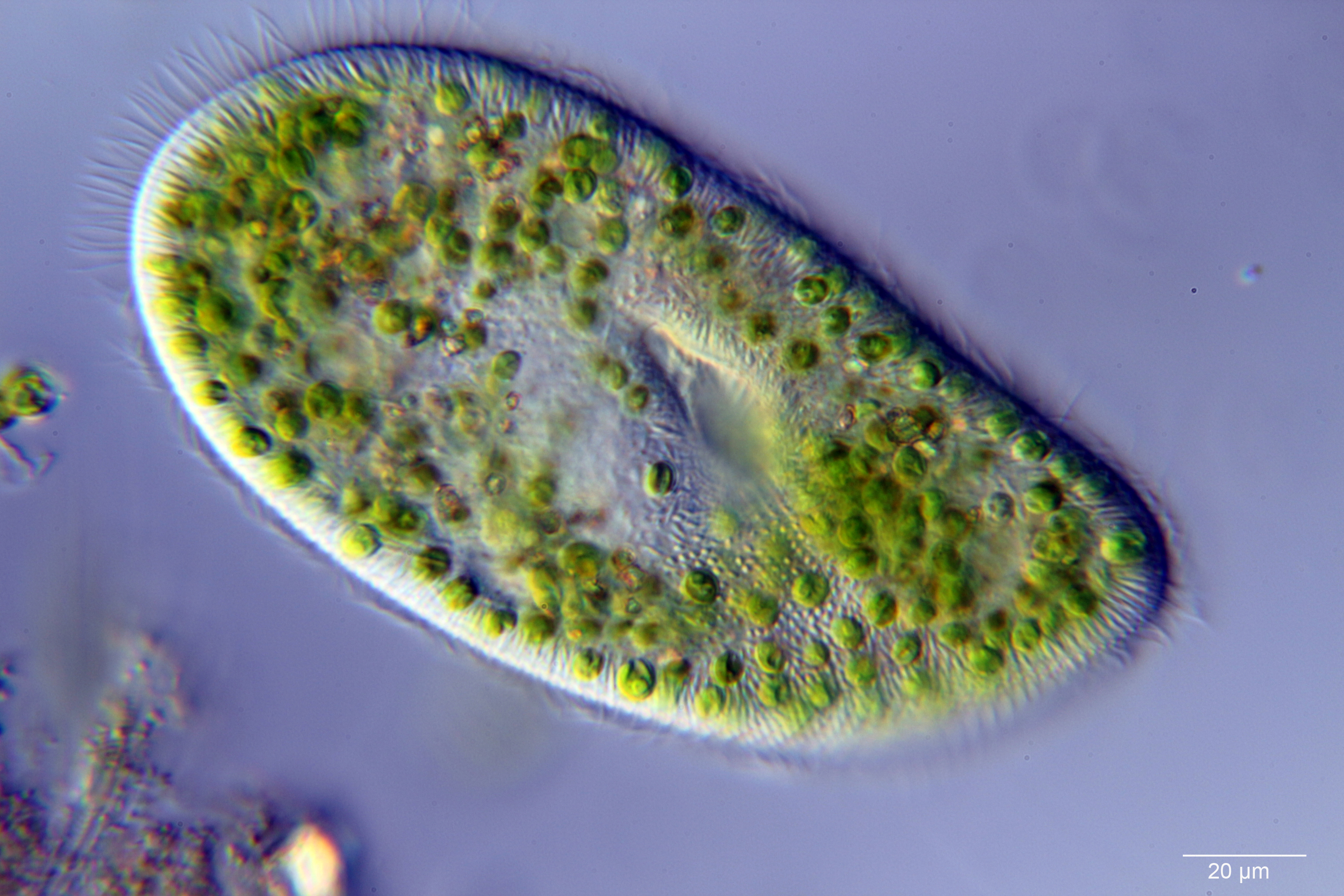
Paramecium bursaria with green zoochlorellae living inside endosymbiotically

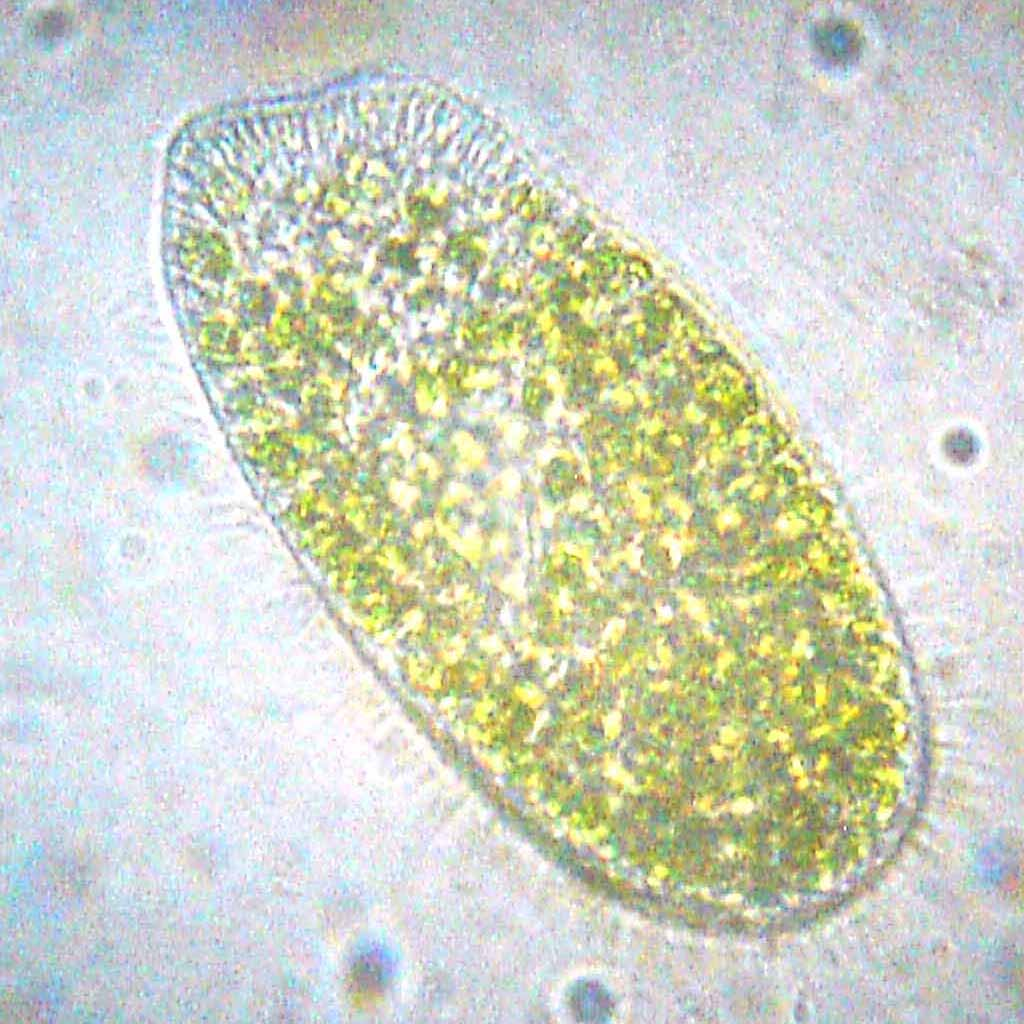
A Paramecium bursaria about 100 μm long

Paramecium bursaria harbors approximately 700 cells of zoochlorellae (green algae) from the genera Chlorella or Micractinium under its cell cortex, forming endosymbionts. The core principle of these endosymbionts is nutrition, where the host obtains nutrients through phagotrophy by engulfing cells or particles, including Chlorella, which are digested in the digestive vacuole (DV). However, some Chlorella cells can resist this digestive process and become enclosed in a distinct vacuole, known as the perialgal vacuole (PV), formed by the host. This vacuole prevents lysosomal fusion, allowing the algae to survive and establish symbiosis. The PV can be distinguished from the digestive vacuole (DV) by the number and distribution of particles, exhibiting minimal endocytosis or exocytosis activity.

Moreover, the mechanism of the symbiotic relationship between Paramecium bursaria and Chlorella, based on comparative genome analysis, suggests that the host provides glutamine and magnesium. Chlorella utilizes glutamine as a nitrogen source and magnesium to support chlorophyll-based photosynthesis. In return, Chlorella within the perialgal vacuole (PV) provides the host with photosynthetic products such as fructose, maltose, and oxygen.

It is also worth highlighting how the host regulates nutrient exchange in this photosynthetic symbiosis. Andrew et al. (2016) developed a mathematical model, using the framework of general symbiotic relationships, to describe the mechanism of this interaction. During vertical transmission of symbionts through cytokinesis, daughter cells receive an equal number of symbionts as their parent cells. However, during horizontal transmission, the daughter cells acquire only half the symbionts. The host's growth rate is influenced by its nutritional state, which depends on the efficiency of nutrient exchange with the symbionts. By managing this exchange, the host can optimize its growth and the overall benefits of the symbiosis.

Focusing on light levels as an environmental condition, the study investigated how the host regulates this mechanism. The results show that as light levels increase, there is a reduction in the symbiont population. This regulation is crucial for maintaining a stable symbiont population and preventing parasitism, which could occur if the symbionts were to overgrow and harm the host.

== Strains ==
In terms of phylogenetic analysis, a study by Christian et al. (2022) collected 48 strains of Paramecium bursaria from around the world and analyzed their phylogenetic lineages using SSU and ITS rDNA sequences. The results revealed five highly supported lineages corresponding to the syngens (R1–R5), which are genetically distinct but reproductively isolated among the P. bursaria strains sharing synapomorphic traits. This study also confirmed the presence of syngens (R1–R5) based on the secondary structures of the SSU and ITS regions, as well as synapomorphies in the amino acid sequences of the COI gene, aiding in syngen identification. These findings enabled the clear assignment of existing P. bursaria entries in GenBank to specific syngens.

In addition, the study examined the morphology and phenotypic plasticity by selecting at least one strain from each lineage: P. protobursaria from syngen R1, P. deuterobursaria from syngen R2, P. tritobursaria from syngen R3, P. tetratobursaria from syngen R4, and P. pentobursaria from syngen R5. In terms of cell length and width, differences among the syngens were not highly significant, although syngen R5 was the longest, followed by R4, R3, R2, and R1, respectively. All syngens were ellipsoidal to broadly ellipsoidal and dorsoventrally flattened in cell shape.

Regarding their symbiotic associations, syngens R1 and R2 formed symbioses with Micractinium conductrix, whereas R3 and R5 associated with Chlorella variabilis. Syngen R4 displayed the ability to host all three algal strains: Micractinium conductrix, Chlorella variabilis, and Chlorella vulgaris.
