= Paramecium woodruffi =

Scientific classification
- Domain: Eukaryota
- Clade: Diaphoretickes
- Clade: SAR
- Clade: Alveolata
- Phylum: Ciliophora
- Class: Oligohymenophorea
- Order: Peniculida
- Family: Parameciidae
- Genus: Paramecium
- Species: P. woodruffi

Binomial name
- Paramecium woodruffi Wenrich, 1928

Species of single-celled organism

Paramecium woodruffi is a species of unicellular organisms belonging to the genus Paramecium of the phylum Ciliophora. It was first isolated in 1928 by D. H. Wenrich. It is a member of the Paramecium aurelia species complex.
