= Euplotidium =

Scientific classification
- Domain: Eukaryota
- Clade: Sar
- Clade: Alveolata
- Phylum: Ciliophora
- Class: Spirotrichea
- Order: Euplotida
- Family: Gastrocirrhidae
- Genus: Euplotidium; Noland, 1937

Species
- Euplotidium itoi; Euplotidium prosaltans Tuffrau, 1985

Genus of single-celled organisms

Euplotidium is a genus of ciliates. Species form symbiotic relations with bacteria in structures named Epixenosomes.
