= Avoidance reaction =

Term used in the description of the movement of paramecium

Avoidance reaction is a term used in the description of the movement of paramecium. This helps the cell avoid obstacles and causes other objects to bounce off of the cell's outer membrane. The paramecium does this by reversing the direction in which its cilia beat. This results in stopping, spinning or turning, after which point the paramecium resumes swimming forward. If multiple avoidance reactions follow one another, it is possible for a paramecium to swim backward, though not as smoothly as swimming forward.

Avoidance reaction occurs when the cell hits an obstruction, providing an anterior, mechanical stimulus:

- The cell will then reverse.
- It will then stop and rotate.
- Now facing a new direction, the cell will move off in that direction.

This process will continue until the cell is able to negotiate its way around the obstruction.

Movement of Paramecium cells is caused by control of calcium ions inside the cell and membrane potentials. The simplest explanation for the avoidance reaction is that membrane potential controls the influx of calcium ions, which regulates the beat frequency and angles of cilia on the surface of the cell.
