= Kappa organism =

In biology, Kappa organism or Kappa particle refers to inheritable cytoplasmic symbionts, occurring in some strains of the ciliate Paramecium. Paramecium strains possessing the particles are known as "killer paramecia". They liberate a substance also known as paramecin into the culture medium that is lethal to Paramecium that do not contain kappa particles. Kappa particles are found in genotypes of Paramecium aurelia syngen 2 that carry the dominant gene K.

Kappa particles are Feulgen-positive and stain with Giemsa after acid hydrolysis. The length of the particles is 0.2–0.5μ.

While there was initial confusion over the status of kappa particles as viruses, bacteria, organelles, or mere nucleoprotein, the particles are intracellular bacterial symbionts called Caedibacter taeniospiralis. Caedibacter taeniospiralis contains cytoplasmic protein inclusions called R bodies which act as a toxin delivery system.

== See also ==
- R bodies
- Paramecium aurelia
