= Food vacuole =

The food vacuole, or digestive vacuole, is an organelle found in simple eukaryotes such as protists. This organelle is essentially a lysosome. During the stage of the symbiont parasites' lifecycle where it resides within a human (or other mammalian) red blood cell, it is the site of haemoglobin digestion and the formation of the large haemozoin crystals that can be seen under a light microscope.

== See also ==
- Protists
- Eukaryote
- Amoeba
- Lysosome
- Enzymes
- Euglenids
- Paramecia
