= Louis Joblot =

French naturalist

Louis Joblot (9 August 1645 – 27 April 1723) was a French naturalist. He was born in Bar-le-Duc, Duchy of Bar and died, aged 57, in Paris.

== Publications ==
- Louis Joblot, Descriptions et usages de plusiers nouveaux microscopes tant simples que composez; avec de nouvelles observations faites sur de multitude innombrable d'insectes, & d'autres animaux de diverses especes, qui naissent dans des liqueurs préparées, & dans celles qui ne le sont point, J. Collombat, printer, Paris, 1718.

== Sources ==
- Hubert Lechevalier, "Louis Joblot and His Microscopes", Bacteriological Reviews, Vol.40, No.1, March 1976, p. 241-258. PDF
- P.W. van der Pas, "Joblot, Louis", Complete Dictionary of Scientific Biography, 2008.
