= Paramecium sonneborni =

Scientific classification
- Domain: Eukaryota
- Supergroup: Alveolata
- Phylum: Ciliophora
- Class: Oligohymenophorea
- Order: Peniculida
- Family: Parameciidae
- Genus: Paramecium
- Species: P. sonneborni

Binomial name
- Paramecium sonneborni Aufderheide, Daggett & Nerad, 1983

Species of single-celled organism

Paramecium sonneborni is a species of unicellular organisms belonging to the genus Paramecium of the phylum Ciliophora. It was first isolated in Texas and named after Tracy M. Sonneborn. It is a member of the Paramecium aurelia species complex. They are covered in cilia and are distinguished by their difference in mating patterns and enzyme patterns. The length of Paramecium sonneborni is between 130 and 186 μm with a mean length of 154μm. It is the newest member of the Paramecium aurelia species complex. The current Paramecium sonneborni strains, so far, reveal very low viability in the generations and are a result of allopatric speciation.
