= Bioindicator =

Species that reveals the status of an environment

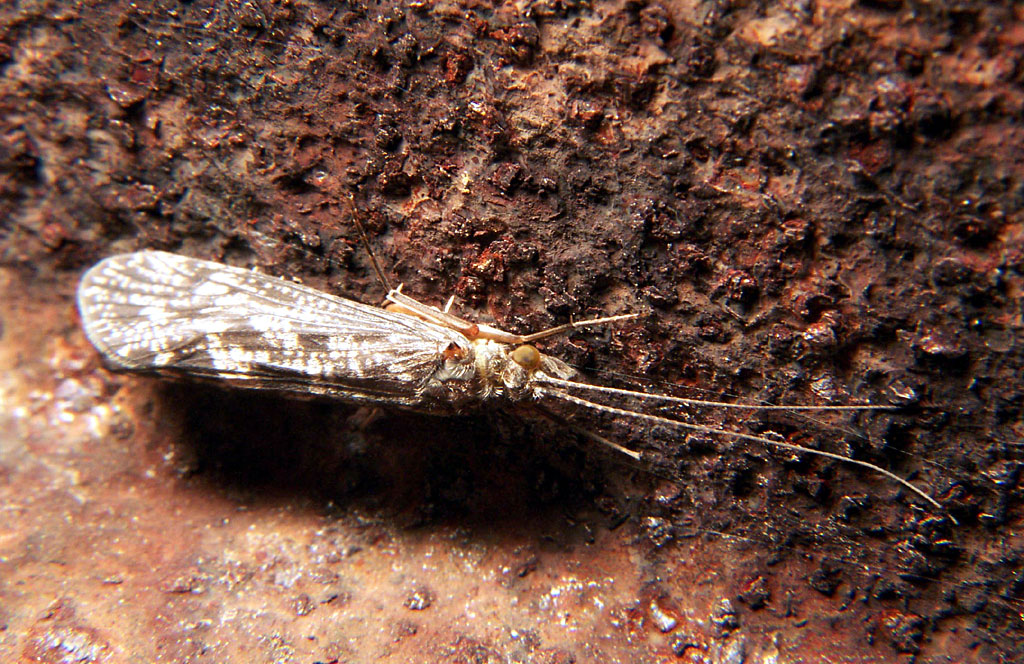
Caddisfly (order Trichoptera), a macroinvertebrate used as an indicator of water quality.

A bioindicator is any species (an indicator species) or group of species whose function, population, or status can reveal the qualitative status of the environment. The most common indicator species are animals. For example, copepods and other small water crustaceans that are present in many water bodies can be monitored for changes (biochemical, physiological, or behavioural) that may indicate a problem within their ecosystem. Bioindicators can tell us about the cumulative effects of different pollutants in the ecosystem and about how long a problem may have been present, which physical and chemical testing cannot.

A biological monitor or biomonitor is an organism that provides quantitative information on the quality of the environment around it. Therefore, a good biomonitor will indicate the presence of the pollutant and can also be used in an attempt to provide additional information about the amount and intensity of the exposure.

A biological indicator is also the name given to a process for assessing the sterility of an environment through the use of resistant microorganism strains (e.g. Bacillus or Geobacillus). Biological indicators can be described as the introduction of a highly resistant microorganisms to a given environment before sterilization, tests are conducted to measure the effectiveness of the sterilization processes. As biological indicators use highly resistant microorganisms, any sterilization process that renders them inactive will have also killed off more common, weaker pathogens.

== Overview ==
A bioindicator is an organism or biological response that reveals the presence of pollutants by the occurrence of typical symptoms or measurable responses and is, therefore, more qualitative. These organisms (or communities of organisms) can be used to deliver information on alterations in the environment or the quantity of environmental pollutants by changing in one of the following ways: physiologically, chemically or behaviourally. The information can be deduced through the study of:

1. their content of certain elements or compounds
2. their morphological or cellular structure
3. metabolic biochemical processes
4. behaviour
5. population structure(s).

The importance and relevance of biomonitors, rather than man-made equipment, are justified by the observation that the best indicator of the status of a species or system is itself. Bioindicators can reveal indirect biotic effects of pollutants when many physical or chemical measurements cannot. Through bioindicators, scientists need to observe only the single indicating species to check on the environment rather than monitor the whole community. Small sets of indicator species can also be used to predict species richness for multiple taxonomic groups.

The use of a biomonitor is described as biological monitoring and is the use of the properties of an organism to obtain information on certain aspects of the biosphere. Biomonitoring of air pollutants can be passive or active. Experts use passive methods to observe plants growing naturally within the area of interest. Active methods are used to detect the presence of air pollutants by placing test plants of known response and genotype into the study area.

The use of a biomonitor is described as biological monitoring. This refers to the measurement of specific properties of an organism to obtain information on the surrounding physical and chemical environment.

Bioaccumulative indicators are frequently regarded as biomonitors. Depending on the organism selected and their use, there are several types of bioindicators.

=== Use ===
In most instances, baseline data for biotic conditions within a pre-determined reference site are collected. Reference sites must be characterized by little to no outside disturbance (e.g. anthropogenic disturbances, land use change, invasive species). The biotic conditions of a specific indicator species are measured within both the reference site and the study region over time. Data collected from the study region are compared against similar data collected from the reference site in order to infer the relative environmental health or integrity of the study region.

An important limitation of bioindicators in general is that they have been reported as inaccurate when applied to geographically and environmentally diverse regions. As a result, researchers who use bioindicators need to consistently ensure that each set of indices is relevant within the environmental conditions they plan to monitor.

== Plant and fungal indicators ==
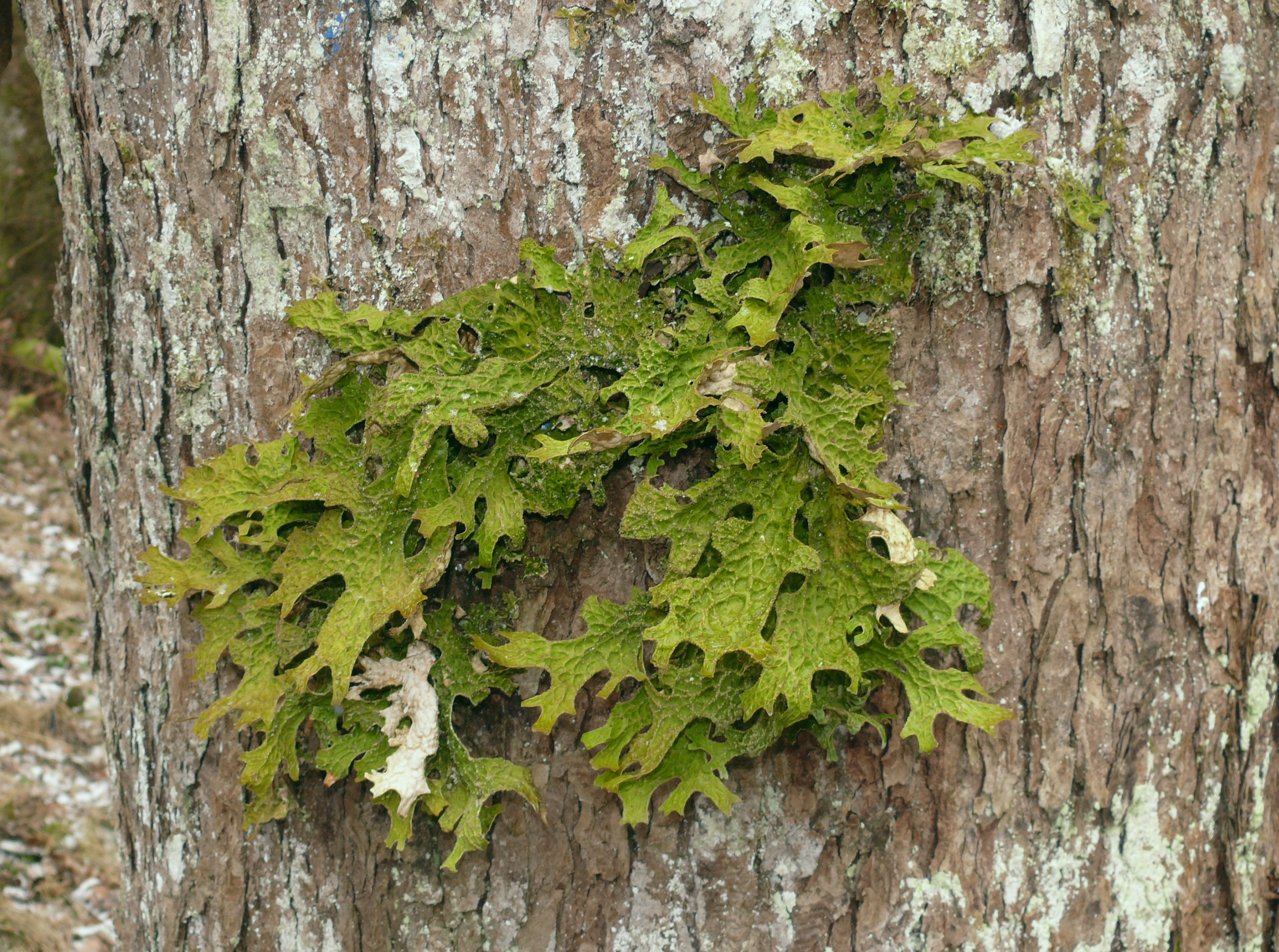
The lichen Lobaria pulmonaria is sensitive to air pollution.

The presence or absence of certain plant or other vegetative life in an ecosystem can provide important clues about the health of the environment: environmental preservation. There are several types of plant biomonitors, including mosses, lichens, tree bark, bark pockets, tree rings, and leaves. As an example, environmental pollutants can be absorbed and incorporated into tree bark, which can then be analyzed to pollutant presence and concentration in the surrounding environment. The leaves of certain vascular plants experience harmful effects in the presence of ozone, particularly tissue damage, making them useful in detecting the pollutant. These plants are observed abundantly in Atlantic islands in the Northern Hemisphere, the Mediterranean Basin, equatorial Africa, Ethiopia, the Indian coastline, the Himalayan region, southern Asia, and Japan. These regions with high endemic richness are particularly vulnerable to ozone pollution, emphasizing the importance of certain vascular plant species as valuable indicators of environmental health in terrestrial ecosystems. Conservationists use such plant bioindicators as tools, allowing them to ascertain potential changes and damages to the environment.

Lichen are well known bio-indicators used to monitor and measure pollution levels. Recognised scales exist allowing the level of pollution to be assessed depending on the species composition present. Most well known is the Hawskworth Rose scale. The utility of lichen in this respects comes from the different tolerance different species have to various pollutants, meaning presence and absence of certain key species can be used to gauge overall pollution levels. As an example, Lobaria pulmonaria has been identified as an indicator species for assessing stand age and macrolichen diversity in Interior Cedar–Hemlock forests of east-central British Columbia, highlighting its ecological significance as a bioindicator. The abundance of Lobaria pulmonaria was strongly correlated with this increase in diversity, suggesting its potential as an indicator of stand age in the ICH. Another Lichen species, Xanthoria parietina, serves as a reliable indicator of air quality, effectively accumulating pollutants like heavy metals and organic compounds. Studies have shown that X. parietina samples collected from industrial areas exhibit significantly higher concentrations of these pollutants compared to those from greener, less urbanized environments. This highlights the lichen's valuable role in assessing environmental health and identifying areas with elevated pollution levels, aiding in targeted mitigation efforts and environmental management strategies.

Fungi is also useful as bioindicators, as they are found throughout the globe and undergo noticeable changes in different environments.

Lichens are organisms comprising both fungi and algae. They are found on rocks and tree trunks, and they respond to environmental changes in forests, including changes in forest structure – conservation biology, air quality, and climate. The disappearance of lichens in a forest may indicate environmental stresses, such as high levels of sulfur dioxide, sulfur-based pollutants, and nitrogen oxides. The composition and total biomass of algal species in aquatic systems serve as an important metric for organic water pollution and nutrient loading such as nitrogen and phosphorus. There are genetically engineered organisms that can respond to toxicity levels in the environment; e.g., a type of genetically engineered grass that grows a different colour if there are toxins in the soil.

=== Indicator fungi ===
Penicillium species, Aspergillus niger and Candida albicans are used in the pharmaceutical industry for microbial limit testing, bioburden assessment, method validation, antimicrobial challenge tests, and quality control testing. When used in this capacity, Penicillium and A. niger are compendial mold indicator organisms.

Molds such as Trichoderma, Exophiala, Stachybotrys, Aspergillus fumigatus, Aspergillus versicolor, Phialophora, Fusarium, Ulocladium and certain yeasts are used as indicators of indoor air quality.

Metagenomic techniques allow for the sequencing of whole populations of microorganisms in a single operation. With metagenomic sequencing, it is possible to use the entire community of fungal organisms, or mycobiome in the soil or water of a given area as a biological indicator of anthropogenic activity, such as sewage overflow from an urban area or fertilizer and pesticide runoff from an agricultural one.

Composition of fungal communities has been found to be a good indicator of environmental properties like pH, altitude and water temperature. Chauvet used this approach to take ecosystem-wide measurements of these variables using a network of monitoring stations at 27 streams in Southwestern France.

Cudowski et al. sampled fungi in the water of the Augustow canal in eastern Poland. They took many standard measures of water quality -- temperature, oxygen saturation, pH, and dissolved nitrogen, organic carbon and sulfur levels. They identified species with microscopic methods and RFLP analysis. They found 38 fungal species, including 12 hyphomycetiae and 13 potential pathogens, belonging either to the dermatophytes or to relatives of C. albicans. Cudowski et al. found that they could determine whether a sample of water had been taken from the natural (lake-like) or artificial part of the canal. They also found that the three major groups of fungi that they found, hyphomycetes, dermatophytes and Candida relatives, could predict many of their water quality measurements, which formed two clusters in a redundancy analysis.

Bouffand et al. used Arbuscular Mycorhizzal Fungi (AMF), an asexual clade of fungi that form symbiotic relationships with plant root systems, as indicators to assess soil function and biodiversity in many sites across Europe. They took soil samples in various climatic zones (atlantic, continental, mediterranean, alpine) and three land use regimes (arable, grassland, forestry), and sequenced the DNA of the fungi the soil contained. They found eight indicator species for soil pH: four that were only present when pH was less than 5, three for pH > 5 and one for pH > 7. They found eight indicators of land use: two for forests, five for farm- and grassland, and one for both. They also found one indicator fungus that was present when soil organic carbon was high, and another present when it was low.

== Animal indicators and toxins ==
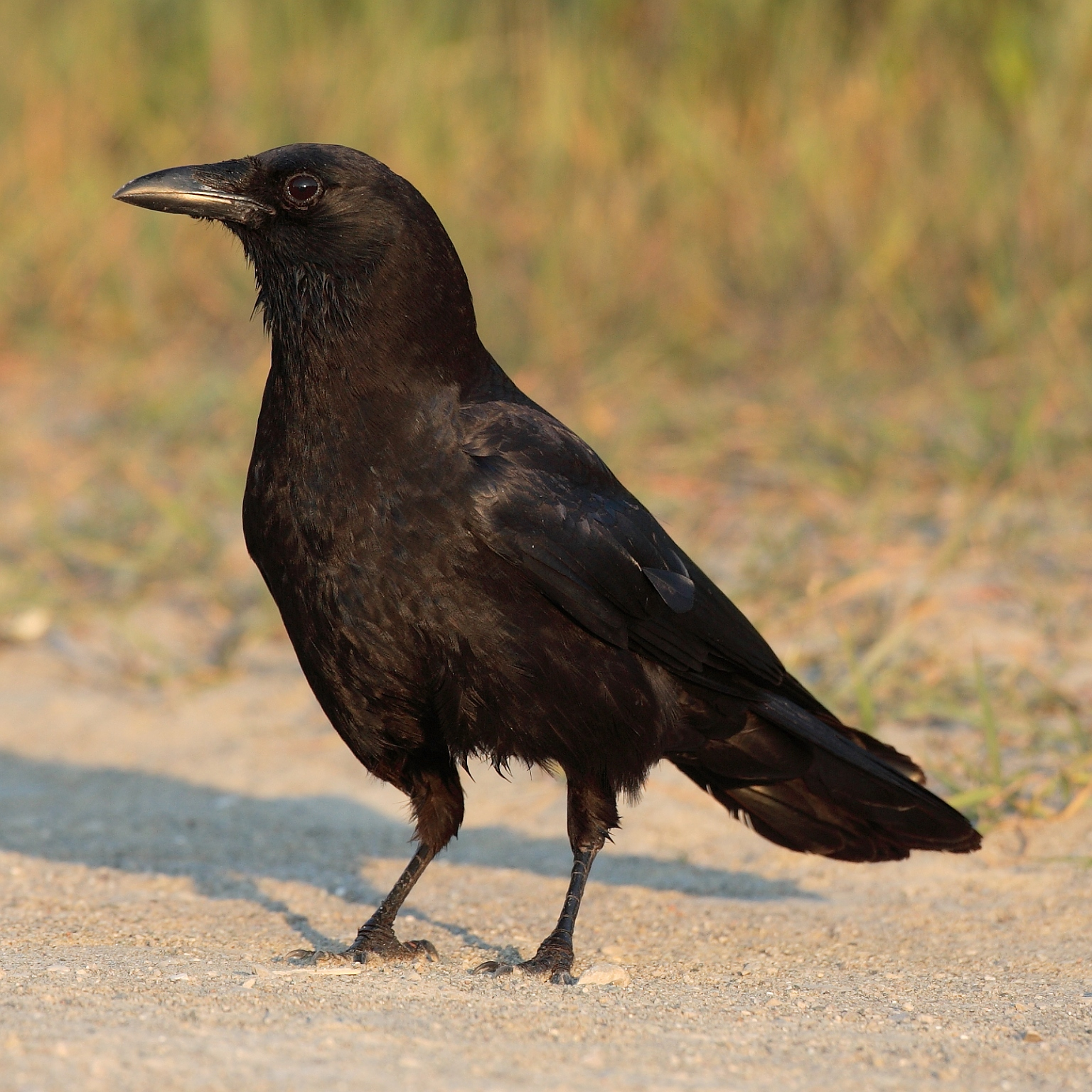
Populations of American crows (Corvus brachyrhynchos) are especially susceptible to the West Nile Virus, and can be used as a bioindicator species for the disease's presence in an area.

Changes in animal populations, whether increases or decreases, can indicate pollution. For example, if pollution causes depletion of a plant, animal species that depend on that plant will experience population decline. Conversely, overpopulation may be opportunistic growth of a species in response to loss of other species in an ecosystem. On the other hand, stress-induced sub-lethal effects can be manifested in animal physiology, morphology, and behaviour of individuals long before responses are expressed and observed at the population level. Such sub-lethal responses can be very useful as "early warning signals" to predict how populations will further respond.

Pollution and other stress agents can be monitored by measuring any of several variables in animals: the concentration of toxins in animal tissues; the rate at which deformities arise in animal populations; behaviour in the field or in the laboratory; and by assessing changes in individual physiology.

=== Frogs and toads ===
Amphibians, particularly anurans (frogs and toads), are increasingly used as bioindicators of contaminant accumulation in pollution studies. Anurans absorb toxic chemicals through their skin and their larval gill membranes and are sensitive to alterations in their environment. They have a poor ability to detoxify pesticides that are absorbed, inhaled, or ingested by eating contaminated food. This allows residues, especially of organochlorine pesticides, to accumulate in their systems. They also have permeable skin that can easily absorb toxic chemicals, making them a model organism for assessing the effects of environmental factors that may cause the declines of the amphibian population. These factors allow them to be used as bioindicator organisms to follow changes in their habitats and in ecotoxicological studies due to humans increasing demands on the environment.

Knowledge and control of environmental agents is essential for sustaining the health of ecosystems. Anurans are increasingly utilized as bioindicator organisms in pollution studies, such as studying the effects of agricultural pesticides on the environment. Environmental assessment to study the environment in which they live is performed by analyzing their abundance in the area as well as assessing their locomotive ability and any abnormal morphological changes, which are deformities and abnormalities in development. Decline of anurans and malformations could also suggest increased exposure to ultra-violet light and parasites. Expansive application of agrochemicals such as glyphosate have been shown to have harmful effects on frog populations throughout their lifecycle due to run off of these agrochemicals into the water systems these species live and their proximity to human development.

Pond-breeding anurans are especially sensitive to pollution because of their complex life cycles, which could consist of terrestrial and aquatic living. During their embryonic development, morphological and behavioral alterations are the effects most frequently cited in connection with chemical exposures. Effects of exposure may result in shorter body length, lower body mass and malformations of limbs or other organs. The slow development, late morphological change, and small metamorph size result in increased risk of mortality and exposure to predation.

=== Crustaceans ===
Crayfish have also been hypothesized as being suitable bioindicators, under the appropriate conditions. One example of use is an examination of accumulation of microplastics in the digestive tract of red swamp crayfish (Procambarus clarkii) being used as a bioindicator of wider microplastics pollution.

=== Bats ===
Bats respond noticeably to environmental changes and have therefore been suggested as potentially valuable bioindicators. Although the number of studies is still relatively small, existing evidence suggests that bats are likely to be excellent indicators in environments like rivers, forests, and urban areas. Nevertheless, further research across large geographic regions is necessary, and building research networks is essential to achieve this. There are also some challenges in using bats as bioindicators, including the difficulty of distinguishing cryptic species and identifying flying bats through their calls. Additionally, it is often challenging to determine which environmental factors shape bat distribution and behaviour.

=== Indicator helminth eggs ===
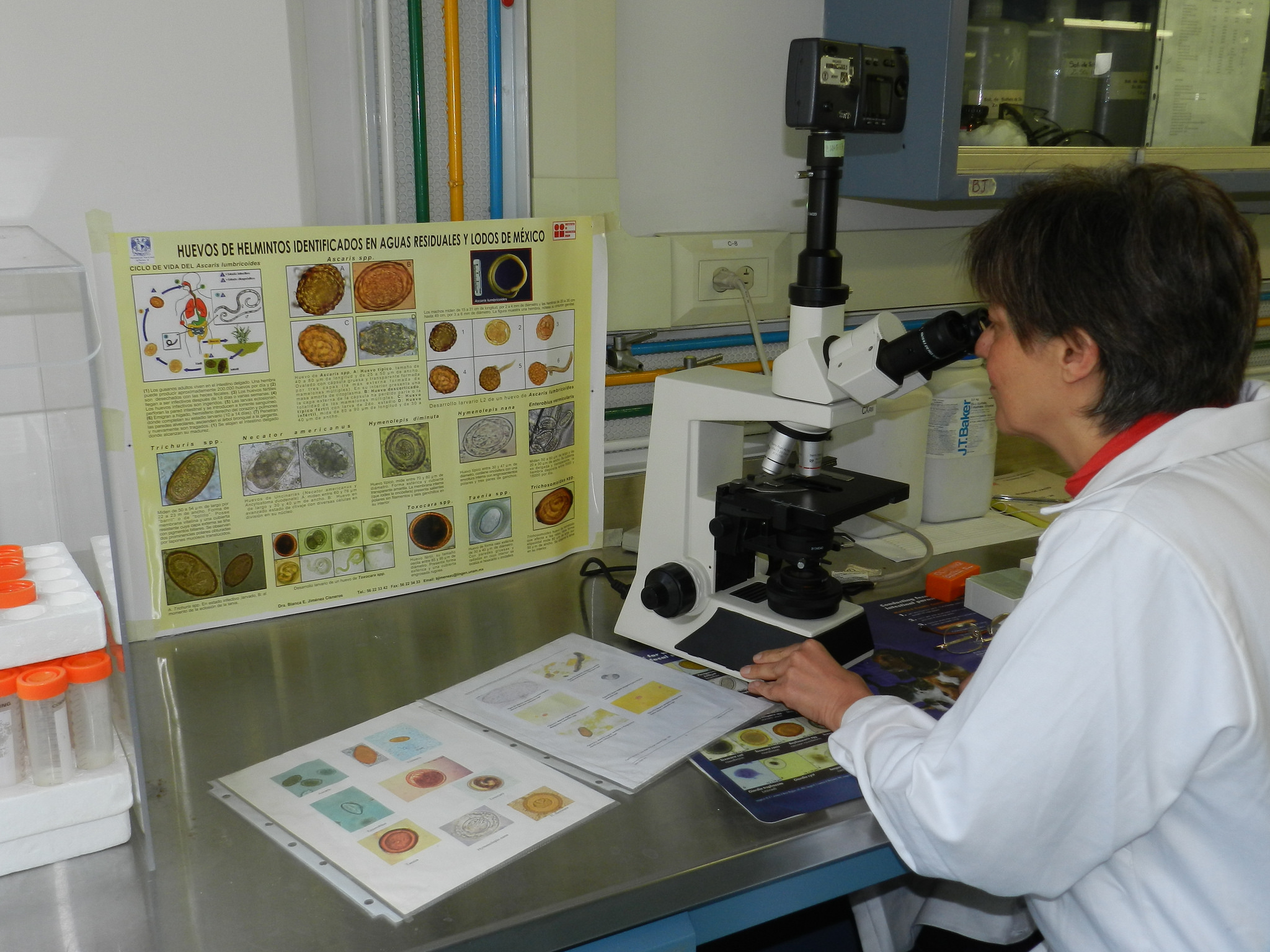
Identification and quantification of helminth eggs at UNAM university in Mexico City, Mexico

The eggs from helminths (parasitic worms) are a commonly used indicator organism to assess the safety of sanitation and wastewater reuse systems (such schemes are also called reuse of human excreta). This is because they are the most resistant pathogens of all types of pathogens (pathogens can be viruses, bacteria, protozoa and helminths). It means they are relatively hard to destroy through conventional treatment methods. They can survive for 10–12 months in tropical climates. These eggs are also called ova in the literature.

Helminth eggs that are found in wastewater and sludge stem from soil-transmitted helminths (STHs) which include Ascaris lumbricoides (Ascaris), Anclostoma duodenale, Necator americanus (hookworm), and Trichuris trichiura (whipworm). Ascaris and whipworm that are identified in reusable wastewater systems can cause certain diseases and complications if ingested by humans and pigs. Hookworms will plant and hatch their larvae into the soil where they grow until maturity. Once the hookworm eggs are fully developed, they infect organisms by crawling through the organism's skin.

The presence or absence of viable helminth eggs ("viable" meaning that a larva would be able to hatch from the egg) in a sample of dried fecal matter, compost or fecal sludge is often used to assess the efficiency of diverse wastewater and sludge treatment processes in terms of pathogen removal. In particular, the number of viable Ascaris eggs is often taken as an indicator for all helminth eggs in treatment processes as they are very common in many parts of the world and relatively easy to identify under the microscope. However, the exact inactivation characteristics may vary for different types of helminth eggs.

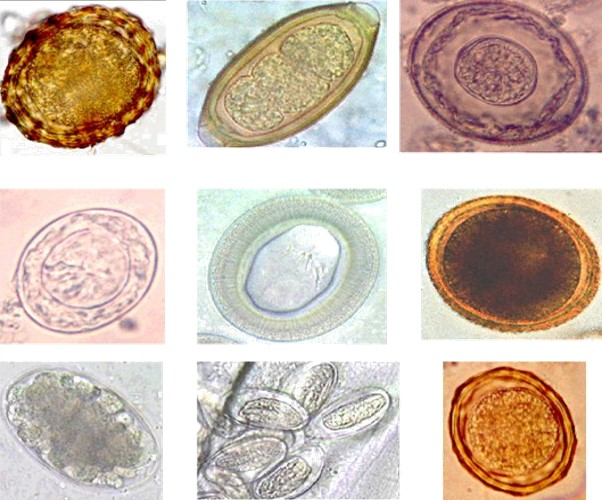
Various microscopic images of different types of helminth eggs

The technique used for testing depends on the type of sample. When the helminth ova are in sludge, processes such as alkaline-post stabilization, acid treatment, and anaerobic digestion are used to reduce the amount of helminth ova in areas where there is a large amount. These methods make it possible for helminth ova to be within the healthy requirements of ≤1 helminth ova per liter. Dehydration is used to inactivate helminth ova in fecal sludge. This type of inactivation occurs when feces is stored between 1-2 years, a high total solids content (>50-60%) is present, items such as leaves, lime, earth, etc. are added, and at a temperature of 30°C or higher.

== Microbial indicators ==
=== Indicator bacteria ===
Certain bacteria can be used as indicator organisms in particular situations, such as when present in bodies of water. Indicator bacteria themselves may not be pathogenic but their presence in waste may indicate the presence of other pathogens. Similar to how there are various types of indicator organisms, there are also various types of indicator bacteria. The most common indicators are total coliforms, fecal coliforms, E. coli, and enterococci. The presence of bacteria commonly found in human feces, termed coliform bacteria (e.g. E. coli), in surface water is a common indicator of faecal contamination. The means by which pathogens found in fecal matter can enter recreational bodies of water include, but are not limited to, sewage, septic systems, urban runoff, coastal recreational waste, and livestock waste.

For this reason, sanitation programs often test water for the presence of these organisms to ensure that drinking water systems are not contaminated with feces. This testing can be done using several methods which generally involve taking samples of water, or passing large amounts of water through a filter to sample bacteria, then testing to see if bacteria from that water grow on selective media such as MacConkey agar. MacConkey agar will only allow the growth of gram-negative bacteria and the bacteria will grow differently according to how it metabolizes lactose or its lack of ability to metabolize it. Alternatively, the sample can be tested to see if it utilizes various nutrients in ways characteristic of coliform bacteria.

Coliform bacteria selected as indicators of faecal contamination must not persist in the environment for long periods of time following efflux from the intestine, and their presence must be closely correlated with contamination by other faecal organisms. Indicator organisms need not be pathogenic.

Non-coliform bacteria, such as Streptococcus bovis and certain clostridia, may also be used as an index of faecal contamination.

The presence of indicator bacteria is measured in a variety of ecosystems and sometimes alongside other measurements. In the Great Lakes, a study was conducted testing for both fecal indicator bacteria (FIB) concentrations and pathogen gene markers. The FIB measured in this study included fecal coliform bacteria, E. coli, and enterococci. FIB were collected via membrane filtration and serial dilution methods, producing samples which could be cultured and used to run PCR and amplify the pathogenic genes in question. Among the 22 sampling locations, 165 samples were analyzed and E. coli concentrations were found to range from less than 2 to 26,000 CFU/100mL, enterococci ranged from less than 2 to 31,000 CFU/100mL, and fecal coliform bacteria ranged from less than 2 to 950 CFU/100mL.

Another example of indicator bacteria being measured for safety purposes is in Malibu, CA. The state of California requires that beaches with greater than 50,000 visitors a year be monitored for FIB. High FIB concentrations, exceeding what is considered acceptable by the EPA were observed in Malibu Lagoon and other Malibu beaches. Measurement of high levels of FIB leads to a search to determine what the source(s) is/are. Potential sources of FIB in the Malibu area include waste from sewage treatment systems, runoff from local developments, and wildlife waste. Common FIB were measured including enterococci which presented itself in levels as high as 242,000 MPN/100mL within onsite wastewater treatment systems. The measurement of FIB is widespread and used for the purpose of providing safe waters.

In Texas, the occurrence and distribution of FIB, in particular fecal coliforms and E. coli, were measured in streams that receive discharge from the Dallas Fort Worth International Airport and the surrounding area. These streams receiving the waste are home to aquatic life, used for recreational purposes, and as fishing sites. Various standards exist in order to ensure the safety of all organisms present in the ecosystem, including humans. E. coli is used as an indicator of unsafe or below standard water quality for recreational use in Texas. The standards for E. coli levels that declare contact recreation unsafe are a geometric mean of over 126 cfu/100mL or over a fourth of the samples measuring levels greater than 394cfu/100mL. Various sites were tested, some found to exceed acceptable levels of E. coli and therefore did not support recreational use. This is yet another example of how testing for indicator bacteria is used to determine whether bodies of water are safe for various uses, particularly recreational use.

=== Chemical pollutants ===
Microorganisms can be used as indicators of aquatic or terrestrial ecosystem health. Found in large quantities, microorganisms are easier to sample than other organisms. Some microorganisms will produce new proteins, called stress proteins, when exposed to contaminants such as cadmium and benzene. These stress proteins can be used as an early warning system to detect changes in levels of pollution.

=== In oil and gas exploration ===
Microbial Prospecting for oil and gas (MPOG) can be used to identify prospective areas for oil and gas occurrences. In many cases, oil and gas is known to seep toward the surface as a hydrocarbon reservoir will usually leak or have leaked towards the surface through buoyancy forces overcoming sealing pressures. These hydrocarbons can alter the chemical and microbial occurrences found in the near-surface soils or can be picked up directly. Techniques used for MPOG include DNA analysis, simple bug counts after culturing a soil sample in a hydrocarbon-based medium or by looking at the consumption of hydrocarbon gases in a culture cell.

=== Microalgae in water quality ===
Microalgae have gained attention in recent years due to several reasons including their greater sensitivity to pollutants than many other organisms. In addition, they occur abundantly in nature, they are an essential component in very many food webs, they are easy to culture and to use in assays and there are few if any ethical issues involved in their use.

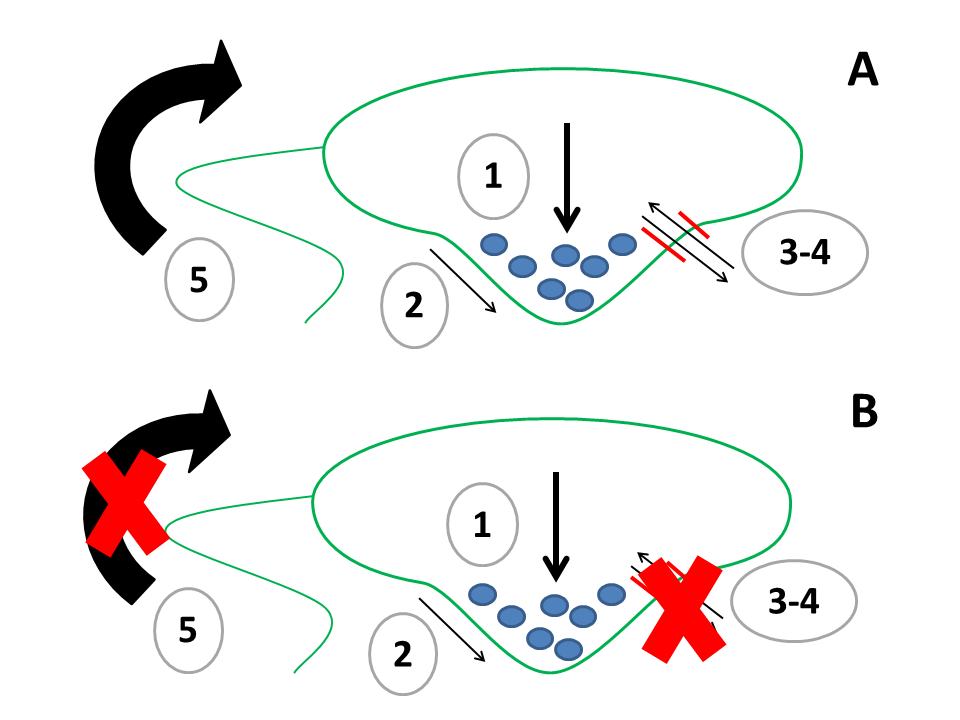
Gravitactic mechanism of the microalgae Euglena gracilis (A) in the absence and (B) in the presence of pollutants.

Euglena gracilis is a motile, freshwater, photosynthetic flagellate. Although Euglena is rather tolerant to acidity, it responds rapidly and sensitively to environmental stresses such as heavy metals or inorganic and organic compounds. Typical responses are the inhibition of movement and a change of orientation parameters. Moreover, this organism is very easy to handle and grow, making it a very useful tool for eco-toxicological assessments. One very useful particularity of this organism is gravitactic orientation, which is very sensitive to pollutants. The gravireceptors are impaired by pollutants such as heavy metals and organic or inorganic compounds. Therefore, the presence of such substances is associated with random movement of the cells in the water column. For short-term tests, gravitactic orientation of E. gracilis is very sensitive. Other species such as Paramecium biaurelia (see Paramecium aurelia) also use gravitactic orientation.

Automatic bioassay is possible, using the flagellate Euglena gracilis in a device which measures their motility at different dilutions of the possibly polluted water sample, to determine the EC_{50} (the concentration of sample which affects 50 percent of organisms) and the G-value (lowest dilution factor at which no-significant toxic effect can be measured).

== Macroinvertebrates ==
Macroinvertebrates are useful and convenient indicators of the ecological health of water bodies and terrestrial ecosystems. They are almost always present, and are easy to sample and identify. This is largely due to the fact that most macro-invertebrates are visible to the naked eye, they typically have a short life-cycle (often the length of a single season) and are generally sedentary. Pre-existing river conditions such as river type and flow will affect macro invertebrate assemblages and so various methods and indices will be appropriate for specific stream types and within specific eco-regions. While some benthic macroinvertebrates are highly tolerant to various types of water pollution, others are not. Changes in population size and species type in specific study regions indicate the physical and chemical state of streams and rivers. Tolerance values are commonly used to assess ecological effects of water pollution such as pesticide contamination with the SPEAR system and environmental degradation, such as human activities (e.g. selective logging and wildfires) in tropical forests.

=== Benthic indicators for water quality testing ===
Benthic macroinvertebrates are found within the benthic zone of a stream or river. They consist of aquatic insects, crustaceans, worms and mollusks that live in the vegetation and stream beds of rivers. Macroinvertebrate species can be found in nearly every stream and river, except in some of the world's harshest environments. They also can be found in mostly any size of stream or river, prohibiting only those that dry up within a short timeframe. This makes the beneficial for many studies because they can be found in regions where stream beds are too shallow to support larger species such as fish. Benthic indicators are often used to measure the biological components of fresh water streams and rivers. In general, if the biological functioning of a stream is considered to be in good standing, then it is assumed that the chemical and physical components of the stream are also in good condition. Benthic indicators are the most frequently used water quality test within the United States. While benthic indicators should not be used to track the origins of stressors in rivers and streams, they can provide background on the types of sources that are often associated with the observed stressors.

=== Global context ===
In Europe, the Water Framework Directive (WFD) went into effect on October 23, 2000. It requires all EU member states to show that all surface and groundwater bodies are in good status. The WFD requires member states to implement monitoring systems to estimate the integrity of biological stream components for specific sub-surface water categories. This requirement increased the incidence of biometrics applied to ascertain stream health in Europe A remote online biomonitoring system was designed in 2006. It is based on bivalve molluscs and the exchange of real-time data between a remote intelligent device in the field (able to work for more than 1 year without in-situ human intervention) and a data centre designed to capture, process and distribute the web information derived from the data. The technique relates bivalve behaviour, specifically shell gaping activity, to water quality changes. This technology has been successfully used for the assessment of coastal water quality in various countries (France, Spain, Norway, Russia, Svalbard (Ny-Ålesund) and New Caledonia).

In the United States, the Environmental Protection Agency (EPA) published Rapid Bioassessment Protocols, in 1999, based on measuring macroinvertebrates, as well as periphyton and fish for assessment of water quality.

In South Africa, the Southern African Scoring System (SASS) method is based on benthic macroinvertebrates, and is used for the assessment of water quality in South African rivers. The SASS aquatic biomonitoring tool has been refined over the past 30 years and is now on the fifth version (SASS5) in accordance with the ISO/IEC 17025 protocol. The SASS5 method is used by the South African Department of Water Affairs as a standard method for River Health Assessment, which feeds the national River Health Programme and the national Rivers Database.

The imposex phenomenon in the dog conch species of sea snail leads to the abnormal development of a penis in females, but does not cause sterility. Because of this, the species has been suggested as a good indicator of pollution with organic man-made tin compounds in Malaysian ports.

== See also ==
- Biological integrity
- Biological monitoring working party (a measurement procedure)
- Biosignature
- Ecological indicator
- Environmental indicator
- Indicator value
- Sentinel species
