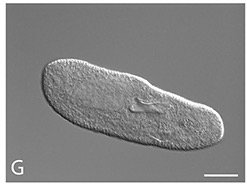
- Paramecium biaurelia with large nucleus and smaller vacuole containing bacteria

Scientific classification
- Domain: Eukaryota
- Clade: Sar
- Clade: Alveolata
- Phylum: Ciliophora
- Class: Oligohymenophorea
- Order: Peniculida
- Family: Parameciidae
- Genus: Paramecium
- Species: P. biaurelia

Binomial name
- Paramecium biaurelia Sonneborn, 1975

= Paramecium biaurelia =

Species of parasitic protist

Paramecium biaurelia is a species of unicellular ciliates under the genus Paramecium, and one of the cryptic species of Paramecium aurelia. It is a free-living protist in water bodies and harbours several different bacteria as endosymbionts. Although the bacteria are parasites by definition, they also exhibit mutual relationship with the protist by providing survival benefits. It is used as an organism model in the study of the effects of gravitational forces in different environments.

Paramecium biaurelia was described by Tracy Morton Sonneborn in 1975 while analysing the different cryptic species of P. aurelia.

== Biology ==
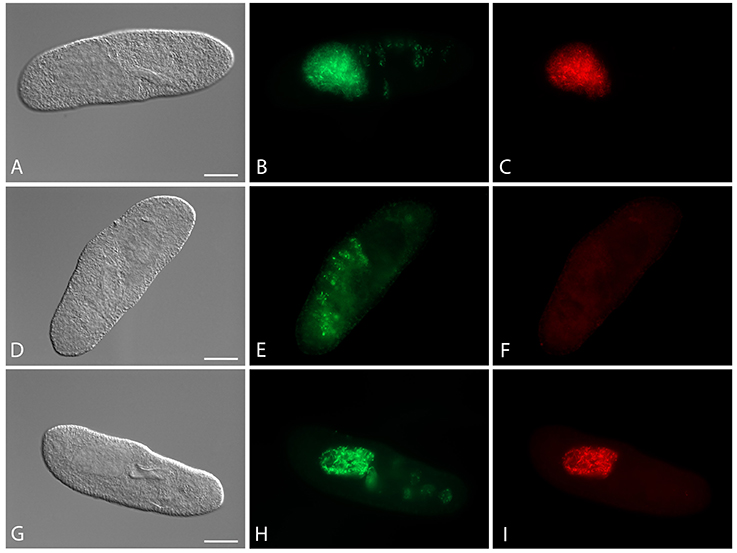
Paramecium biaurelia with a bacterial endosymbiont Preeria caryophila. Greens and reds are the bacteria. Faint green and missing red in the middle row is due to antibiotic treatment.

Paramecium biaurelia is a unicellular protist with elongated body, which measures about 133 μm in length. The distinguishing feature from other species of P. aurelia is that it reproduces at below 21°C and specifically between 9 PM and 7 AM. It is also genetically distinct (clade) without any indication of genetic mixing (gene flow) with other cryptic species.

The most important bacterial endosymbionts are Holospora caryophila, Caedibacter paraconjugatus, and (Candidatus) Bealeia paramacronuclearis, which are members of the family Rickettsiaceae, and (Candidatus) Fokinia cryptica, which belongs to the family Midichloriaceae. The bacteria are gram-negative species. They are energy parasites as they depend on the host's ATP for their energetic functions, but they increase the growth rate of the protists in return. H. caryophila can infect P. biaurelia and P. caudatum, and was reclassified into a new genus as Preeria caryophila, based on detailed morphological analysis and phylogeny.

P. caryophila are parasitic inside the nucleus of P. biaurelia. As with other species of Holospora, they rely on the protist for amino acids, energy metabolic pathways including glycolysis and the citric acid cycle, as well as for nucleotides. In contrast, Bealeia paramacronuclearis and Fokinia cryptica are cytoplasmic parasites. Bealeia paramacronuclearis are spherical or oval shaped measuring about 1.8 to 2.4 μm long and 0.4 to 0.5 μm broad. Inside the protist, they are arranged in clusters of about 7 to 8 cells in parallel lines. They mostly lie close to the macronucleus (the reason for the species name) and sometimes appear attached to the nuclear envelope. Fokinia cryptica are smaller with the diameter 0.35 to 0.40 μm. They are more randomly distributed in the cytoplasm.

== Distribution ==
Paramecium biaurelia is present in Europe, Asia, Australia, New Zealand, Tasmania, and North and South America. It is most abundant in cold to moderate climates but does not occur in the tropics.
