= Aquatic macroinvertebrates =

Animals with a stage that lives in water

Aquatic macroinvertebrates are insects in their nymph and larval stages, snails, worms, crayfish, and clams that spend at least part of their lives in water. These insects play a large role in freshwater ecosystems by recycling nutrients as well as providing food to higher trophic levels.

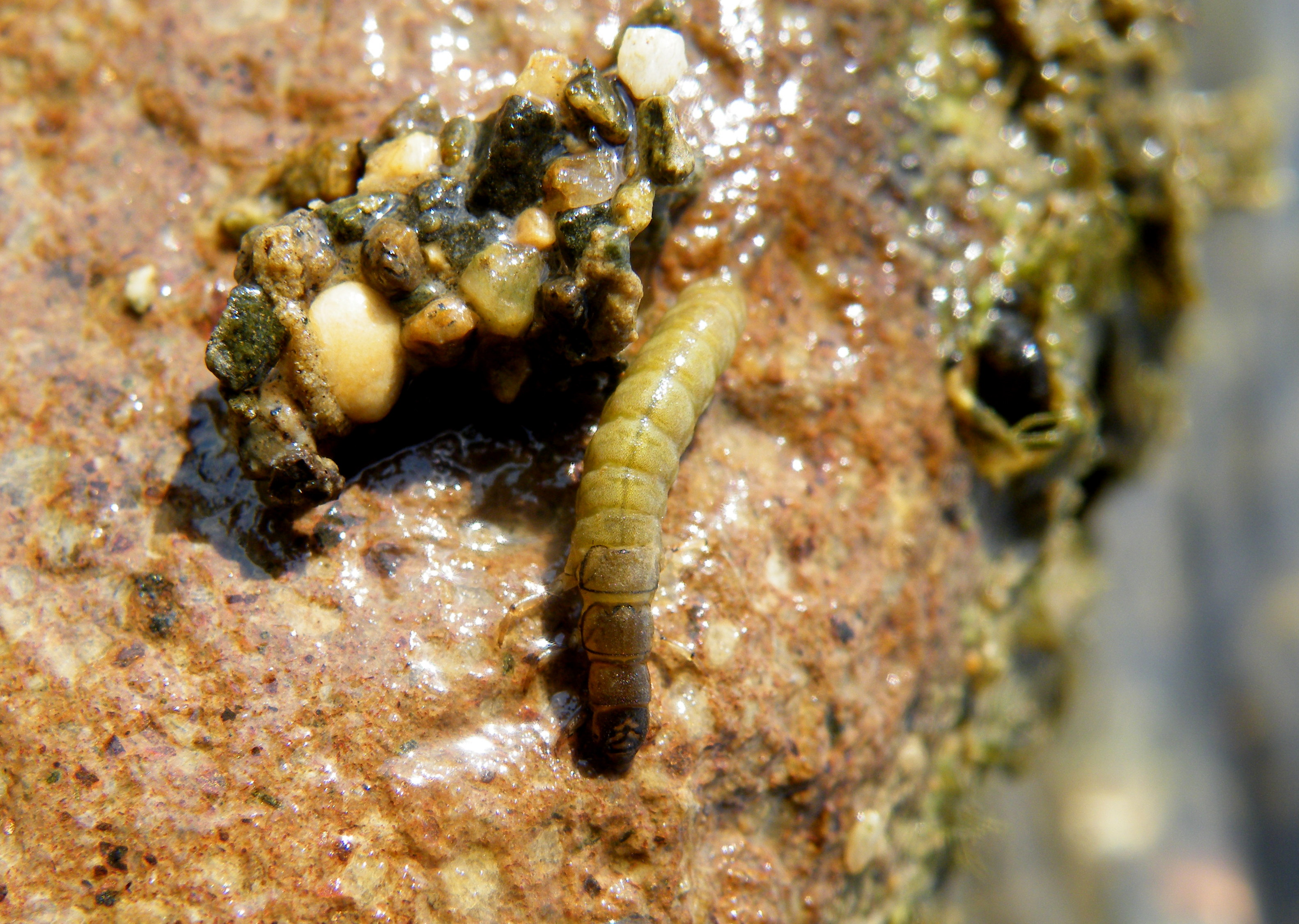
Trichoptera larva

They are visible to the naked eye, do not possess a vertebral column, and spend at least a portion of their lives in water. These invertebrates are ubiquitous to freshwater ecosystems around the world and are present in both lotic and lentic ecosystems, often living among the rocks and sediment. Aquatic macroinvertebrates include insects, bivalves, gastropods, annelids, and crustaceans. Aquatic insect orders include Trichoptera, Ephemeroptera, Odonata, Megaloptera, Plecoptera, Diptera, and Coleoptera.

== Life histories ==
Aquatic macroinvertebrates are oviparous, however their life history strategies vary. Their reproductive strategies fall along a continuum between semelparous and iteroparous, and involve differences in egg number, egg size, and brood care. Once they hatch, the majority of aquatic macroinvertebrates undergo three main life stages: nymph, pupa, and adult. Some taxa, like dragonflies, spend their adult stage outside the water. Other taxa, like water beetles, are aquatic for their entire lives. The evolution of different life history strategies of aquatic macroinvertebrates has allowed species to take advantage of differences in food supply and allow some to better tolerate extreme environmental conditions.

== Feeding ==
Macroinvertebrates play an important role in aquatic food webs as they are major food sources for higher trophic levels. Macroinvertebrates are also crucial in aquatic nutrient cycling. They are often food generalists and have therefore been classified into five main groups called functional feeding groups. This facilitates the incorporation of their ecological roles into research studies. Their classification into these five groups is based on a combination of their morphological characteristics and behavioral mechanisms of feeding. These groups include shredders, grazers, gatherers, filterers, and predators.

The River Continuum Concept proposed by Vannote, predicts the functional distribution of aquatic macroinvertebrates in a stream based on food resources. This concept highlights the importance of freshwater ecosystem inputs to food resources and how this influences aquatic macroinvertebrate communities.

=== Shredders ===
Shredders feed on coarse particulate organic matter (CPOM) from terrestrial leaf litter inputs. Using their mouthparts, they shred organic matter to feed and in doing so, suspend smaller particles into the water column. Examples include Diptera (e.g. Tipulidae) and Plecoptera (e.g. Tallaperla).

=== Grazers ===
Grazers use rasping mouthparts to scrape biofilm and algae off rocks and submerged aquatic vegetation and include Ephemeroptera (e.g. Baetidae). Their grazing affects algal biomass in aquatic ecosystems and therefore primary production in aquatic ecosystems.

=== Collectors/Gatherers ===
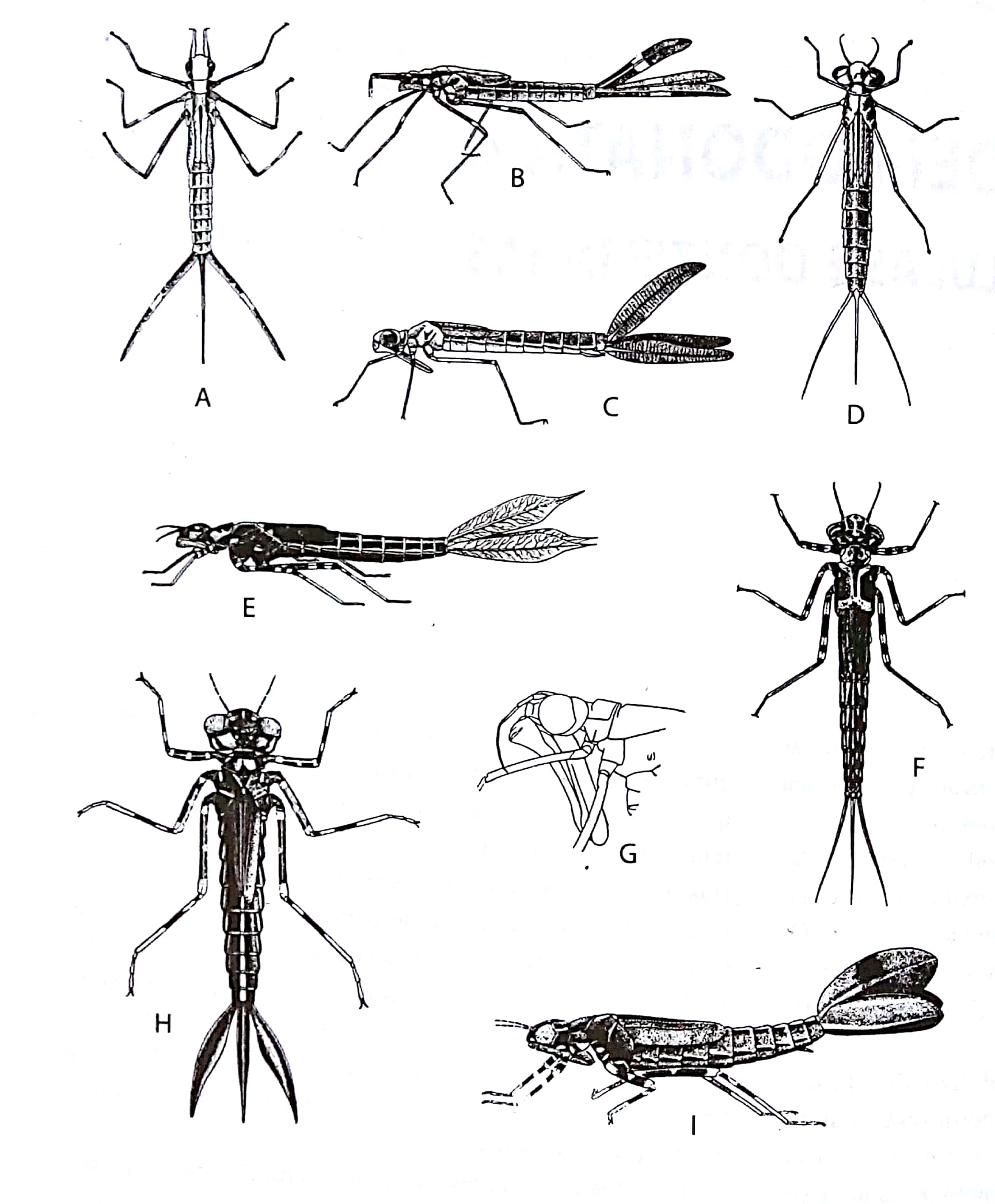
Odonata larval species

Collectors/gatherers primarily scavenge stream or lakebed substrates for deposited fine particulate organic matter (FPOM) and dead organisms. They play a role in bioturbation and resuspension of organic matter and include Diptera (e.g. Chironomidae).

=== Filterers ===
Filterers remove suspended FPOM from the water column using a variety of filtering mechanisms. They expend less energy searching for food, rather relying on sufficient current velocity and upstream food supply. Examples include Diptera (e.g. Simuliidae) and Coleoptera (e.g. Elmidae).

=== Predators ===
Predators consume animal tissue and therefore have direct top-down effects on the food web. Some predator species include Odonata and Plecoptera larvae which utilize grasping mouthparts to ambush their prey.

== Bioindicators ==
Aquatic macroinvertebrate communities are strongly influenced by both biotic and abiotic factors in their environment, and act as bioindicators for the overall condition of freshwater ecosystems. Aquatic macroinvertebrates are vulnerable organisms that are susceptible to small changes in their surrounding environment. Species have been classified based on their tolerance to environmental changes, and their assemblages can therefore indicate if an ecosystem is healthy. Some examples of the impacts that cause stressors on macroinvertebrates are water pollution, land alteration, climate change, and flow regulation. These stressors often stack to create even more adverse challenges to macroinvertebrate communities. Stressors can cause a decrease in both biodiversity and overall stream health in freshwater ecosystems.

Aquatic macroinvertebrate species can be used directly to observe ecosystem health. Stream health can be evaluated using a biotic index. The orders Ephemeroptera, Plecoptera, and Trichoptera are sensitive to pollutants so they are used to calculate an EPT index to indicate water general quality. Specific effects of pesticides can be indicated with the SPEAR index. E.g. German stream monitoring of pesticide exposure and effects.
