= Stokesia =

Stokesia may refer to:

- Stokesia (plant), a plant genus in the family Asteraceae
- Stokesia (ciliate), a single-celled ciliate protozoa genus in the family Stokesiidae
