= Lorande Loss Woodruff =

American biologist

Lorande Loss Woodruff (July 14, 1879 – June 23, 1947) was an American biologist, notable for his exhaustive studies of unicelluar eukaryotes, especially ciliates; and for his long tenure as a trustee of the Marine Biological Laboratory in Woods Hole, Massachusetts. He was a member of the National Academy of Sciences.

== Early life and education ==
Woodruff was a native of New York City, attended its public schools, then City College of New York, and then Columbia University, earning an A.B. in 1901 and Ph.D. in 1905.

== Career ==
He was an instructor in biology at Williams College until 1907, when he moved to Yale rising through the ranks to full professor and chair of the biology department (1938-1946). From 1910, Woodruff was in charge of Yale's course in general biology; generations of students used his textbook "The Foundations of Biology" in six successive editions.

From 1905, Woodruff was associated with the Marine Biological Laboratory (MBL), where he spent summers and taught courses in embryology, then protozoology. He became a member of the MBL board in 1923 and served until his death, twenty-four years later.

Woodruff's original scientific research was entirely on ciliates, unicellular eukaryotes with hair-like organelles—the cilia. A matter of interest in his time was whether sexual reproduction, involving the conjugation of two organisms with fusion and repartition of their nucleii (we would now say: recombination of their DNA), was obligate for protists—and, if so, which species and how often. It was known that Paramecium aurelia generally reproduced asexually (i.e., by fissioning into two identical daughters), but that it did occasionally conjugate and reproduce sexually. Over eight years, Woodruff raised 5,000 successive generations of P. aurelia in a manner that precluded conjugation, providing strong evidence (later increased to 24,000 generations) that purely asexual reproduction could continue indefinitely.

Honored in his time, Woodruff was a member and officer of many scientific societies and was considered one of the best-known American biologists worldwide. He was interested in the history of biology and gave a graduate course in the subject. But, ironically, history has not been kind to his own work. The ciliates (indeed all the protists) are now understood to be much more complex than was understood in Woodruff's time. The question of whether homologous recombination of their DNA is a required feature on evolutionary time scales is a deep one, not like to be answered by any simple set of experiments. Writing only a few months after Woodruff's death in 1947, G. Evelyn Hutchinson (often known as the "father of modern ecology") wrote: "In retrospect, Woodruff's career seems unspectacular but extremely useful. A true servant of science and education, his contributions are built solidly into the fabric of our culture but can now be identified only by those with long memories or an exceptional interest in the past.... He belongs to history, which is what he would have wanted."
