= Plasmagene =

Plasmagene is a term used to describe genetic elements that exist outside of the nucleus, typically within the cytoplasm of a cell. These elements are usually associated with organelles like mitochondria and chloroplasts, which contain their own genetic material and replicate independently of the nuclear genome. Plasmagene theory as proposed by Tracy Sonneborn has significantly contributed to the understanding of non-Mendelian inheritance patterns, where traits are passed through cytoplasmic inheritance rather than through nuclear DNA.

== Function and characteristics ==
Plasmagenes play crucial roles in various cellular processes, especially those involved in energy production. For instance, mitochondrial plasmagenes are integral to oxidative phosphorylation, the process responsible for generating most of the cell's ATP, the main energy currency of cells. Though they can replicate independently, plasmagenes are often semi-autonomous, as they rely on nuclear genes for many essential proteins that support their functions.

== Inheritance and implications ==
One of the most noteworthy aspects of plasmagenes is their involvement in non-Mendelian inheritance patterns. Unlike nuclear genes, which are inherited from both parents, plasmagenes are typically inherited maternally. This occurs because cytoplasmic organelles, like mitochondria, are transferred primarily through the egg cell during fertilization. Consequently, mutations or abnormalities in plasmagenes are linked to various inherited disorders, particularly those affecting muscular and neurological systems.

== Historical context and research ==
Research on plasmagenes dates back to the mid-20th century, focusing on their role in extranuclear inheritance and its implications for genetic diseases. These studies have been instrumental in elucidating how genetic information can be passed outside the nuclear DNA, altering the understanding of inheritance patterns and disease transmission. The plasmagene theory was later disproved, and in 1976 Sonneborn affirmed this. But later research after Sonneborn's death provided validation allowing continued studies.
