= SPEARpesticides =

Biological indicator in streams

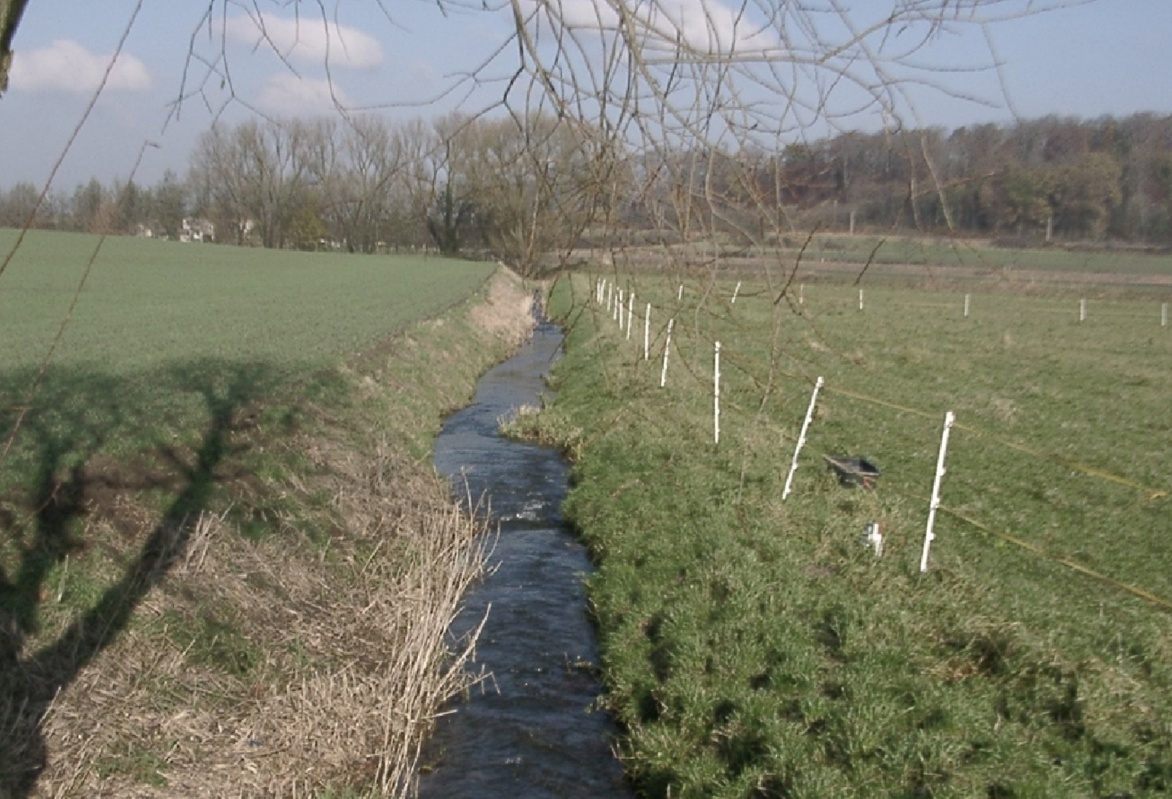
Typical stream in an agricultural landscape

SPEAR_{pesticides} (Species At Risk) is a trait based biological indicator system for streams which quantitatively links pesticide contamination to the composition of macroinvertebrate communities. The approach uses species traits that characterize the ecological requirements posed by pesticide contamination in running waters. Therefore, it is highly specific and only slightly influenced by other environmental factors. SPEAR_{pesticides} is linked to the quality classes of the EU Water Framework Directive (WFD)

== History ==
SPEARpesticides has been first developed for Central Germany and updated. SPEAR_{pesticides} was adapted and validated for streams and mesocosms worldwide and provides the first ecotoxicological approach to specifically determine the ecological effects of pesticides on aquatic invertebrate communities. Argentina, Australia Denmark, Finland, France, Germany, Kenya, Switzerland, USA, Russia Mesocosms.

== Calculation ==
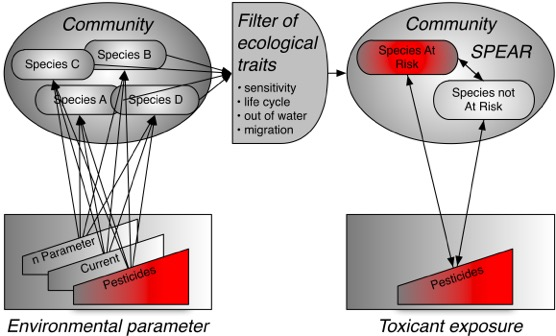
Concept of SPEAR_{pesticides}

SPEAR_{pesticides} estimates pesticide effects and contamination. The calculation is based on monitoring data of invertebrate communities as ascertained for the EU Water Framework Directive (WFD). A simplified version of SPEAR_{pesticides} is included in the ASTERICS software for assessing the ecological quality of rivers. A detailed analysis is enabled by the free SPEAR Calculator. The SPEAR Calculator provides most recent information on species traits and allows specific user settings. The SPEAR_{pesticides} index is computed as relative abundance of vulnerable 'SPecies At Risk' (SPEAR) to be affected by pesticides. Relevant species traits comprises the physiological sensitivity towards pesticides, generation time, migration ability and exposure probability. The indicator value of SPEAR_{pesticides} at a sampling site is calculated as follows:

$SPEAR_{pesticides} = \frac{\sum_{i=1}^n \log(4x_i+1)y}{\sum_{i=1}^n \log (4x_i+1)}$

with n = number of taxa; x_{i} = abundance of taxon i; y = 1 if taxon i is classified as SPEAR-sensitive; y = 0 if taxon i is classified as SPEAR-insensitive.

An application is available for the calculation. Web address of SPEAR calculator
