= Herbert Spencer Jennings =

American geneticist and eugenicist (1868–1947)

Herbert Jennings
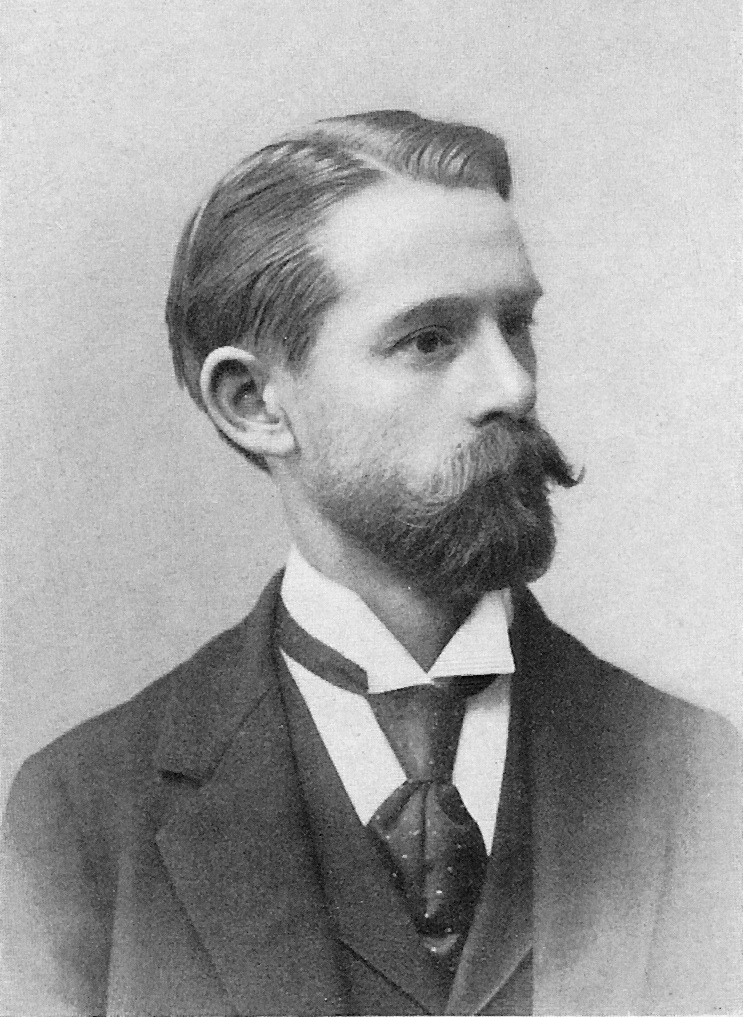
- Born: Herbert Spencer Jennings; April 8, 1868; Tonica, Illinois, U.S.
- Died: April 14, 1947 (aged 79); Santa Monica, California, U.S.
- Education: University of Michigan
- Scientific career
- Fields: Zoology, geneticism, eugenics

Herbert Spencer Jennings (April 8, 1868 – April 14, 1947) was an American zoologist, geneticist, and eugenicist. His research helped demonstrate the link between physical and chemical stimulation and automatic responses in lower orders of animals (Behavior of the Lower Organisms, 1906).

== Life ==
He was born in Tonica, Illinois, on April 8, 1868, the son of George Nelson Jennings and his wife Olive Taft Jenks.

He completed a BS (1893) at the University of Michigan, an AM (1895) at Harvard University and a PhD (1896). In 1906 he began a long and illustrious career at Johns Hopkins University in Baltimore, retiring in 1938. He married twice: firstly in 1898 to Louisa Burridge and secondly in 1939 to Lulu Plant.

He died in Santa Monica, California, on April 14, 1947.

== Career ==
Jennings was elected to the American Philosophical Society in 1907 and in 1914 both the American Academy of Arts and Sciences and the United States National Academy of Sciences.

Tracy Sonneborn would later write:

Jennings was so struck by the continued production of hereditarily diverse clones at conjugation, even after many successive inbreedings, that he undertook to examine the matter mathematically. As a result, general formulae for the results of diverse systems of mating were published in a series of papers between 1912 and 1917; these were one of the main seeds from which the whole field of mathematical genetics developed.

In 1924, Jennings published an article in Scientific Monthly on "Heredity and Environment" which was prescient for anticipating the double helix, and provocatively liberal for its comments on racial differences and American immigration policy.

Jennings was the recipient of the inaugural 1925 Leidy Award of the Academy of Natural Sciences of Philadelphia.

After complaints about the documentary titled The Hereditarily Diseased, the Carnegie Institution of Washington appointed Jennings to review the work of Harry H. Laughlin at the Institution's Eugenics Record Office, then part of what has become the Cold Spring Harbor Laboratory. Jennings found falsified data and manipulated conclusions, and Laughlin was forced out. In 1930, he published The Biological Basis of Human Nature, discussing eugenics, genetic influence on human traits, and criticizing simplistic interpretations of heritability based on Mendelism, emphasizing gene-environment interaction & polygenicity; Sonneborn would describe the impact of The Biological Basis of Human Nature as widespread: "Probably no book by a geneticist has been so widely quoted by American workers in the fields of education, sociology, anthropology, and psychology. In spite of inevitable misquotation and misinterpretation, it has exercised a distinctly salutary effect on those fields and is to a large extent responsible for whatever they have assimilated in this country from modern genetics."

== See also ==
- Category:Taxa named by Herbert Spencer Jennings
