= Stokesiidae =

Scientific classification
- Domain: Eukaryota
- Clade: Sar
- Superphylum: Alveolata
- Phylum: Ciliophora
- Class: Oligohymenophorea
- Order: Peniculida
- Genus: Stokesiidae; Roque, 1961

Genera
- Disematostoma Lauterborn, 1894; Stokesia Wenrich, 1929

Family of single-celled organisms

Stokesiidae is a family of ciliates in the order Peniculida.
