= Selective logging in the Amazon rainforest =

Selective logging or partial forest removal is the practice of cutting down a few species of trees while leaving the rest intact and unharmed. Selective logging is often considered a better alternative to clear cutting. Selective logging in the Brazilian Amazon Rainforest was recently shown in analyses of Landsat Enhanced Thematic Mapper Plus data at high spatial resolution to be occurring at rates of about 12,000–20,000 km^{2} per year, thus indicating the central role of selective logging in tropical forest disturbance. Although selective logging has far less impact on forest processes than deforestation, selectively logged sites have higher rates of forest fires, tree fall, changes in microclimate, soil compaction and erosion, among other ecological impacts on biodiversity and ecosystem functioning.

Selective logging is a dominant form of land use in the Brazilian Amazon. Canopy gap fractions patterns are found to result from selective logging caused tree falls, roads, skid trails, and log decks, which are areas where logs are staged for transport. These gaps can vary between logging operations. Logging activities has now increased from initially low volume harvests of floodplains to much higher rates that remove around 25 million cubic metres (880×10^{6} cu ft) of wood from the forest each year. The ecological, social, and economic impacts drive a better understanding of efficient forest management techniques and deforestation.

== History ==
Logging in the Brazilian Amazon started when settlers came from Europe in the 17th century. Until the 1950s, logging was only allowed in floodplains around the main rivers and only in small portions. This changed as industrial mills started to populate the Amazon to produce sawn wood and veneer. These mills gained access to other areas of the Amazon through new government policies and turned selective logging into the main contributor to economic growth. This also allowed a variety of other species to be harvested in much higher volumes. This led to an abrupt advancement in the economy followed by a decline along with, high rates of deforestation, ecological damage, and a precedent of poor management practices that continue to purge the logging industry today.

Three decades later timber stocks decreased and a scarcity of raw materials caused mills to continuously relocate to new frontiers. Logging centers are located in the nearly all of the states of the Brazilian Amazonia. These migrations did not implement any new management techniques.

== Ecological and economic impacts ==
Selective logging is the practice of removing only one or two tree species from a certain area. As mentioned before, selective logging is a more efficient method when compared to clear-cutting but there are still negative impacts. Selective logging in the Amazon rainforest has transitioned from low-volume harvests of one or two species to a system that can log multiple species and remain profitable. It is one of the many land uses in developing frontiers in the Amazon. However, the growth of this industry is not correlated with efficient management and better harvesting techniques. Although there are many advancements in forest management, such as reduced impact logging (RIL), they haven't been widely adopted. Several reasons as to why harmful selective logging techniques are preferred over RIL include: unclearly stated property rights, high government transaction costs, and lack of accessible information on forest management techniques. RIL also affects regeneration of trees because it creates smaller canopy gaps that restricts the natural light that regenerating trees need to survive.

Two ways to gain permission to log forests in the Brazilian Amazon are through policy regulated forest management plans and deforestation. Nearly 15 million m^{3} of wood was recorded through these permissions between 2000 and 2004, but over 24 million cubic metres (850×10^{6} cu ft) was recorded between 1998 and 2004. Much of the production from these years came from illegal logging. Illegal logging leads to governmental tax loss and poor economic advancement in logging related sectors. Additionally, illegal logging results in impoverished forests, biodiversity loss, and increased probability of fire.

The intensity at which all logging operations are harvesting has a direct effect on ecological advancement. Initially, forest canopy cover decreases as a result of selective logging, which leads to a slowdown of forest growth, hydrological processes, and food supply. In addition to altering forest structure, selective logging also alters the carbon cycle, and other key biogeochemical processes that help to control and maintain forest productivity. The effects of selective logging can be broken down into three major components: ground damage as a result of harvest operations, temporal patterns of canopy gap fraction within each ground damage category, and temporal changes in gap fraction resulting from felled trees. Canopy gap fraction is the integrated effect of several scale-dependent biophysical properties that provide information on canopy openness after selective logging. Trails are the biggest contributor to the ground damage, but log decks and roads were small components of the overall ground damage. However, different harvest methods and techniques result in different ground damage levels. Despite similar harvest techniques, conventional logging methods produce more ground damage than reduced impact logging.

Selective logging is one of the many land uses in the Brazilian Amazon, but it also increases the human access to forests through the development of a multitude of logging roads. These roads allow easier access to logging sites but also make it easier for hunters to access forest land, which reduces the biodiversity within the forest. Also, logging is most likely to occur around these roads because ease of access allows for more profit. This leads to large gap fractions and high rates of deforestation. Inevitably, the probability of deforestation is higher for poorly managed selective logging in forest than those without. These increases in canopy openings result in degradation and increased susceptibility to fire. Forest fragmentation is also driven as a result of high impact logging a forest. Logging in the Brazilian Amazon results in forest fragmentation as new areas of forests are produced for either clear cutting or selective logging.

Almost half of the selective logging operations in the Amazon were illegal during the early 2000s. Since many of the logging practices were unregulated, high damage extraction operations rendered the forest land susceptible to drought and fire. In recently logged forests, canopy gap fractions are highest in log decks; however, the overall effect on forest gap fraction is negligible because of the deck's small surface area.

== See also ==
- Amazon rainforest
- Reforestation
- Deforestation in Brazil
- Heli-logging
