= Stokesia vernalis =

Scientific classification
- Domain: Eukaryota
- Clade: Sar
- Superphylum: Alveolata
- Phylum: Ciliophora
- Class: Oligohymenophorea
- Order: Peniculida
- Family: Stokesiidae
- Genus: Stokesia; Wenrich, 1929
- Species: S. vernalis

Binomial name
- Stokesia vernalis Wenrich, 1929

Genus of single-celled organisms

Stokesia is a genus of single-celled ciliates in the family Stokesiidae. The only species in this genus is Stokesia vernalis.
