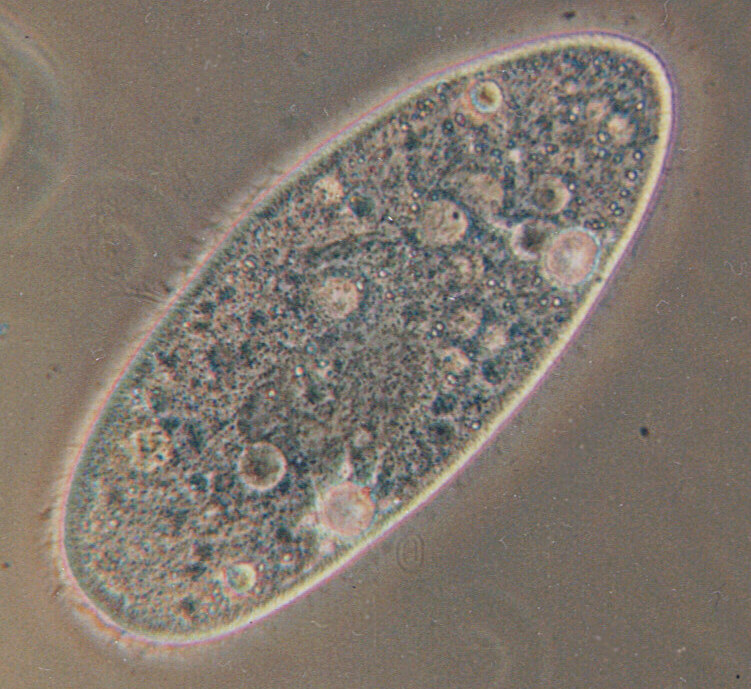
- Paramecium aurelia

Scientific classification
- Domain: Eukaryota
- Clade: Sar
- Clade: Alveolata
- Phylum: Ciliophora
- Class: Oligohymenophorea
- Subclass: Peniculia; Fauré-Fremiet in Corliss, 1956
- Order: Peniculida; Fauré-Fremiet in Corliss, 1956

Families
- Clathrostomatidae; Frontoniidae; Lembadionidae; Maritujidae; Neobursaridiidae; Parameciidae; Stokesiidae; Urocentridae

= Peniculid =

Order of single-celled organisms

The peniculids are an order of ciliate protozoa, including the well-known Paramecium and related genera, such as Frontonia, Stokesia, Urocentrum and Lembadion. Most are relatively large, freshwater forms that feed by sweeping smaller organisms into the mouth. They have simple life cycles, and in many cases do not even form resting cysts.

Typically the body has uniform, dense cilia, which also cover a vestibule preceding the mouth. Extrusomes are characteristically in the form of spindle trichocysts, which release thread-like shafts, and never mucocysts. The oral cilia include peniculi, corresponding to the membranelles of related groups, arranged parallel to the mouth deep in the oral cavity. Nematodesmata (rods) arise from the bases of the oral or perioral cilia, but these do not support a cyrtos as in some other classes. Two suborders are recognised:

- The Frontoniina typically have a shallow oral cavity, with a long paroral membrane and denser somatic kineties to the right of the mouth. These are called ophryokineties, and take part in forming the new mouth during cell division.
- The Parameciina typically have a deeper oral cavity, with peniculi mainly forward of the mouth, and the paroral membrane reduced, though still present throughout interphase.

The peniculids were first defined by Fauré-Fremiet in 1956. Originally they were one of three suborders of the hymenostomes, which are now treated as subclasses of the Oligohymenophorea. They were divided into two suborders by Small and Lynn in 1985, who placed them in the class Nassophorea, owing to ultrastructural peculiarities such as the presence of nematodesmata, which was considered to indicate the cyrtos was secondarily absent. However, more recent schemes reverse this move.
