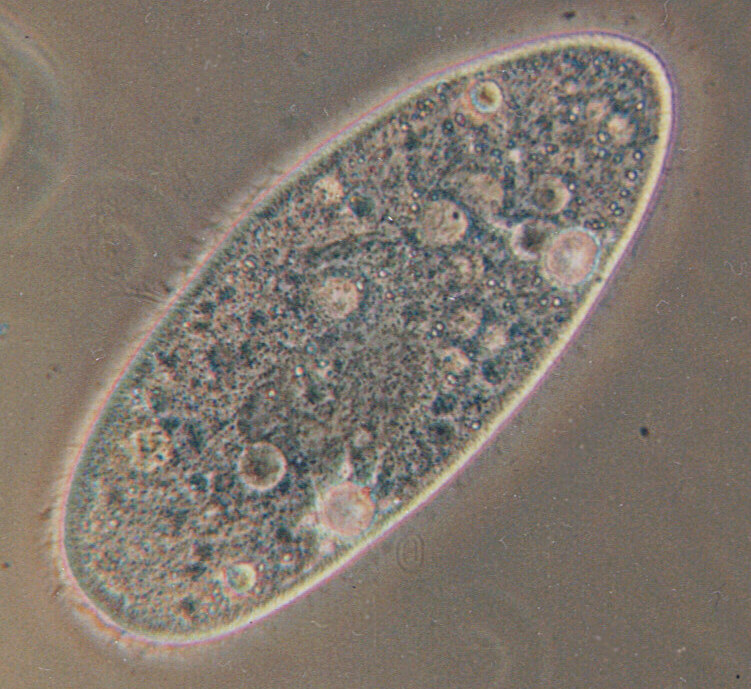
- Paramecium aurelia

Scientific classification
- Domain: Eukaryota
- Clade: Diaphoretickes
- Clade: SAR
- Clade: Alveolata
- Phylum: Ciliophora
- Class: Oligohymenophorea
- Order: Peniculida
- Family: Parameciidae; Dujardin 1840

Genera
- Paramecium Müller, 1773; Physanter Jankowski, 1975

= Parameciidae =

Family of unicellular organisms

Parameciidae is a family of ciliates in the order Peniculida. Members of this family have differentiated anterior and posterior regions and are bounded by a hard but elastic pellicle. The family contains the genera Paramecium and Physanter.
