= Tracy Sonneborn =

American biologist

Tracy Sonneborn ForMemRS
- Born: October 19, 1905; Baltimore, Maryland, USA
- Died: January 26, 1981 (aged 75)
- Education: Baltimore City College, Johns Hopkins University (PhD 1928)
- Known for: Research on Paramecium aurelia
- Spouse: Ruth Meyers
- Children: Two sons, Lee and David
- Scientific career
- Fields: Biology of Protozoa
- Institutions: Johns Hopkins University, Indiana University
- Doctoral advisor: Herbert S. Jennings

Tracy Morton Sonneborn ForMemRS (October 19, 1905 – January 26, 1981) was an American biologist. His life's study was ciliated protozoa of the group Paramecium.

== Education ==
Sonneborn attended the Baltimore City Public Schools and graduated from the Baltimore City College (high school) in 1922. As an adolescent, Sonneborn was interested in the humanities and considered becoming a rabbi. After taking a biology course taught by E. A. Andrews, his interest in literature was eclipsed by his interest in science. He earned a B.A. from Johns Hopkins University in 1925 and a Ph.D. in 1928. His graduate work, supervised by Herbert S. Jennings, focused on the flatworm Stenostomum.

== Career ==
Sonneborn spent 1928 and 1929 researching the ciliate Colpidium with Jennings as a National Research Council fellow. He remained at Hopkins until 1939, with appointments as research assistant, research associate, and associate. He was offered a faculty position at Indiana University, where he served as associate professor, professor (1943), distinguished service professor (1953), and distinguished service professor emeritus (1976).

Sonneborn was elected to the United States National Academy of Sciences in 1946, the American Academy of Arts and Sciences in 1949, and the American Philosophical Society in 1952. In 1964 he was elected as a Foreign Member of the Royal Society.

== Non-Mendelian inheritance patterns ==
Sonneborn combined the skilled observation of a natural historian, with a deep interest in cellular, genetic, and organismic methodology. After completing his thesis in 1930 on the microscopic worm Stenostomum, Sonneborn began to study ciliated protozoa, particularly Paramecium aurelia. Sonneborn made a major step towards the domestication of Paramecium when he discovered mating types in 1937. Having determined how to regulate Paramecium breeding behavior, he went on to explore heritable variations. His books "Methods in the general biology and genetics of Paramecium aurelia" (1950) and "Methods in Paramecium research" (1970) were highly cited and provided ongoing value to investigators.

Sonneborn was particularly interested in "the interaction of genes, cytoplasm and the environment in the control of cellular heredity". He was the first to show cytoplasmic inheritance in animals, in his work with the cytoplasmic factor "kappa". Mitochondria and chloroplasts along with other internal cellular organelles (Kappa particles) which had their own DNA were inherited but limited by their distribution in the cytoplasm at the time of cell division. Only progeny from the 'half' of the cell with the mutant organelles inherited those organelles and thus the associated trait. Obviously, most cells had a distribution such that the organelles were in both halves but in cases where the new mutant arose and thus is rare then only those cells with cytoplasm containing the rare form inherited the traits associated with it.

Sonneborn found that character differences frequently involved both Mendelian and non-Mendelian elements. His work on the formation of macronuclei suggested that genetic information passed from an old macronucleus to cytoplasm to a newly forming macronuclei, a mode of inheritance later named macronuclear inheritance.

Another important discovery was killer traits. Sonneborn found that some paramecia produced toxins that affected other strains but not their own. He showed that nuclear genes were necessary to perpetuate the killer trait, which depended on the presence of the cytoplasmic "kappa" factor. Without kappa, strains became sensitive to the toxin. Sonneborn also developed serotypes, each of which was associated with an independent genetic loci and a specific active gene. Serotype specificity and expression were due to alleles at the serotype loci. Sonneborn developed plasmagene theory, the idea that genes produce a self-reproducing entity that is retained through somatic cell divisions and lost in sexual reproduction. Other researchers eventually showed that kappa was a symbiotic bacteria, disproving plasmagene theory. Sonneborn eventually determined that the cytoplasm in mating-type inheritance was only a transmitter of information between the old and new macronucleus, not a source of self-reproducing cytoplasmic genes.

Sonneborn went on to study the cortical structure of Paramecium and demonstrated that "preexisting structure controls the way new structures are formed in the cortex of ciliated protozoans", a phenomenon he called cytotaxis. This structural inheritance was a new phenomenon in genetics, and could be applied to all types of organisms.

Sonneborn also conducted a series of experiments studying the synchronised movement of the paramecium's cilia. These hair-like projections move together like dancers in a ballet and enable the single-celled organism to "swim" through the liquid in which it lives. Sonneborn surgically rotated a small section of the cell wall by 180 degrees and found that the replaced section continued to 'wave' in the same direction it had before surgery, i.e. now in antiphase to the others. The paramecium's daughters showed the same trait of a reverse phase wave if the reversal overlapped the division plane. If it did not overlap the division plane only one of the progeny showed the inverted sequence.

== Sonneborn as teacher ==
Sonneborn was an innovative teacher. He taught a course entitled "Heredity, Evolution and Society" that dealt with the science of genetics and the implications that technological advancements in that field held for society. One of his popular lectures involved students enacting the process of protein synthesis during which the genetic code is translated into the sequential addition of amino acids to form a polypeptide. His enthusiasm was infectious, and his lectures inspired students to study protozoa and algae.

== Personal life ==
Sonneborn married Ruth Meyers in 1929. Though educated as a social worker, Meyers concentrated on supporting her husband's career. They had two sons: Lee (1929–2004), a mathematician, and David (b. 1934), a biologist.
