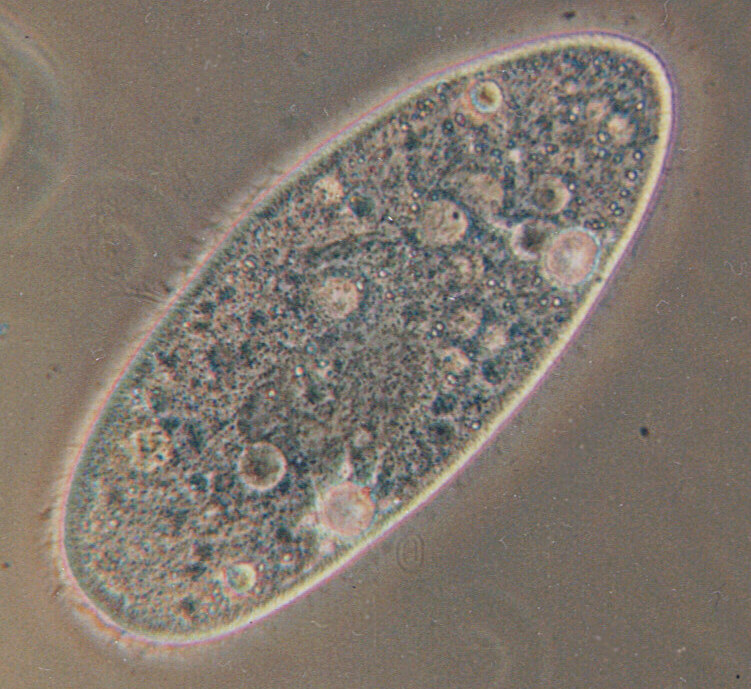

Scientific classification
- Domain: Eukaryota
- Supergroup: Alveolata
- Phylum: Ciliophora
- Class: Oligohymenophorea
- Order: Peniculida
- Family: Parameciidae
- Genus: Paramecium
- Species: P. aurelia

Binomial name
- Paramecium aurelia Ehr.

= Paramecium aurelia =

Species of single-celled organism

Paramecium aurelia are unicellular organisms belonging to the genus Paramecium of the phylum Ciliophora. They are covered in cilia which help in movement and feeding. Paramecium can reproduce sexually, asexually, or by the process of endomixis. Paramecium aurelia demonstrate a strong "sex reaction" whereby groups of individuals will cluster together, and emerge in conjugant pairs. This pairing can last up to 12 hours, during which the micronucleus of each organism will be exchanged. In Paramecium aurelia, a cryptic species complex was discovered by observation. Since then, some have tried to decode this complex using genetic data.

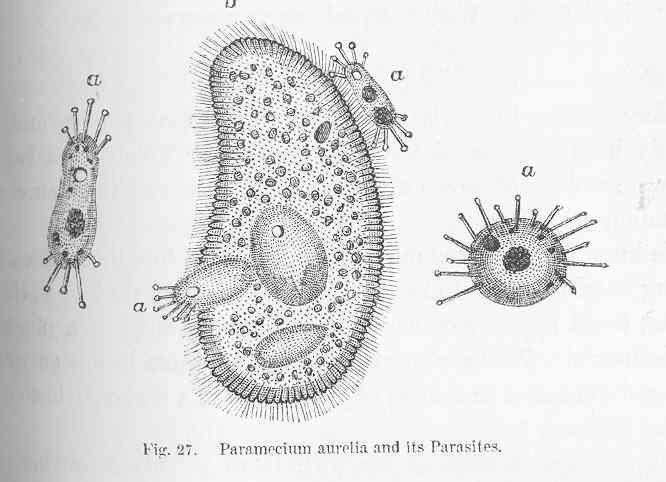
Drawing of Paramecium aurelia and its parasites

== Taxonomy ==
Paramecium aurelia is a species complex composed of 15 known species (syngens), which are

- Paramecium primaurelia
- Paramecium biaurelia
- Paramecium triaurelia
- Paramecium tetraurelia
- Paramecium pentaurelia
- Paramecium sexaurelia
- Paramecium septaurelia
- Paramecium octaurelia
- Paramecium novaurelia
- Paramecium decaurelia
- Paramecium undecaurelia
- Paramecium dodecaurelia
- Paramecium tredecaurelia
- Paramecium quadecaurelia
- Paramecium sonneborni

== Ecology ==
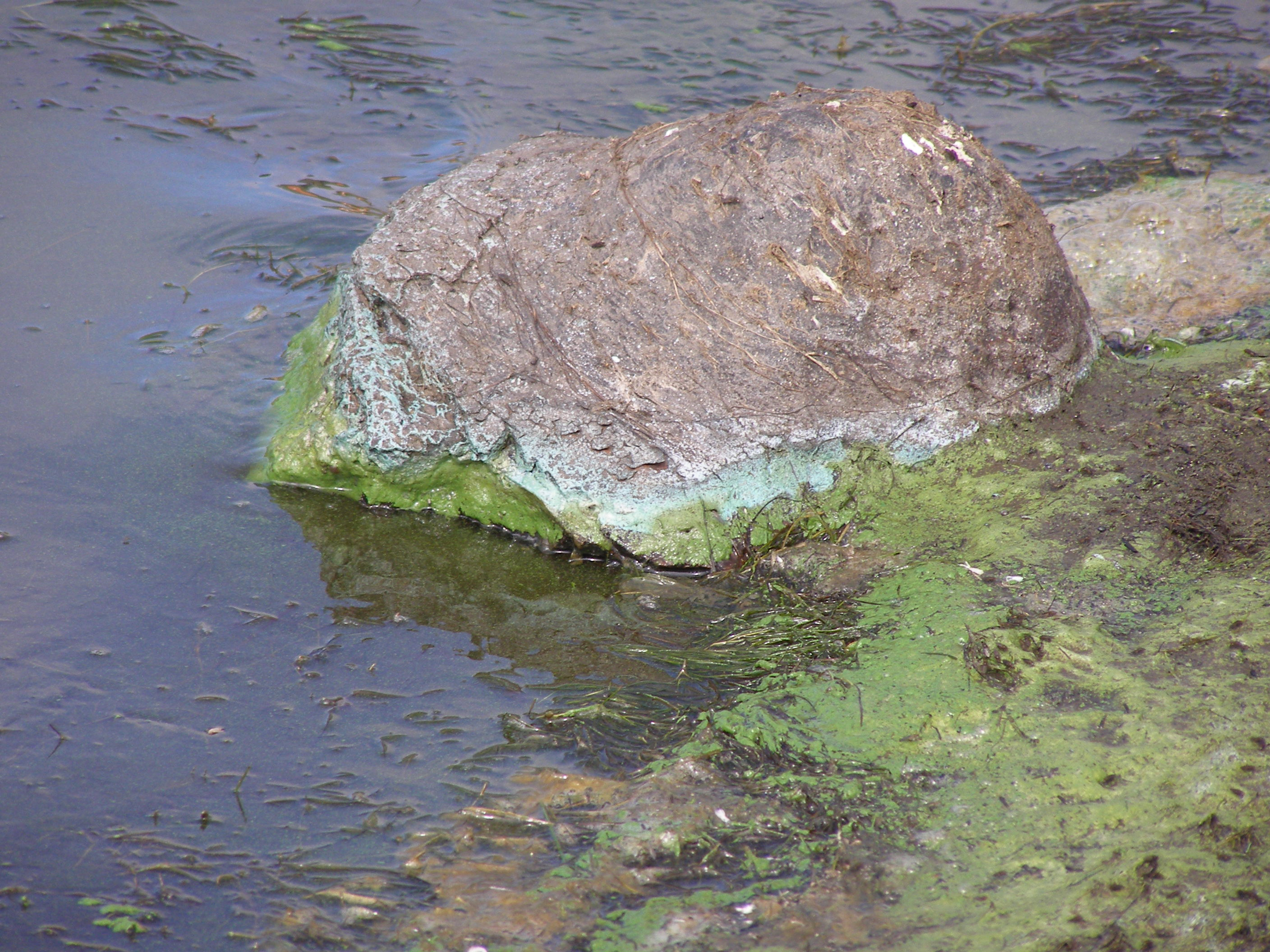
Scum of algae and cyanobacteria on water surface

Paramecia are found in freshwater environments, and are especially in scums. Paramecia are attracted by acidic conditions, since they eat bacteria, which often acidify their surroundings. They are an important link in the detrital food web in aquatic ecosystems, eating bacteria and dead organic matter often associated with these bacteria, and being preyed on by protists and small animals.

== Aging ==
Clonal aging, associated with a gradual loss of vitality, occurs in the asexual fission phase of growth of P. tetraurelia, during which cell divisions occur by mitosis rather than meiosis. In P. tetraurelia, the asexual line loses vitality and expires after about 200 fissions if the cells fail to undergo autogamy or conjugation. The basis for this loss of vitality (clonal aging) was clarified by transplantation experiments of Aufderheide in 1986. When macronuclei of clonally young P. tetraurelia were injected into P. tetraurelia of standard clonal age, the lifespan (clonal fissions) of the recipient was prolonged. In contrast, transfer of cytoplasm from clonally young P. tetraurelia did not prolong the lifespan of the recipient. These transplantation experiments indicated that the macronucleus, rather than the cytoplasm, is responsible for clonal aging. Additional experiments by Smith-Sonneborn, Holmes and Holmes, and Gilley and Blackburn showed that, during clonal aging, DNA damage increases dramatically. Thus, DNA damage in the macronucleus appears to be the cause of clonal aging in P. tetraurelia.

== Meiosis and rejuvenation ==
When clonally aged P. tetraurelia are stimulated to undergo meiosis in association with either conjugation or automixis, the genetic descendants are rejuvenated, and are able to have many more mitotic binary fission divisions. During conjugation or automixis, the micronuclei of the cell(s) undergo meiosis, the old macronucleus disintegrates, and a new macronucleus is formed by replication of the micronuclear DNA that had recently undergone meiosis. There is apparently little, if any, DNA damage in the new macronucleus. These findings further support the idea that clonal aging is due, in large part, to a progressive accumulation of DNA damage; and that rejuvenation is due to the repair of this damage in the micronucleus during meiosis. Meiosis appears to be an adaptation for DNA repair and rejuvenation in P. tetraurelia. In P. tetraurelia, CtlP protein is a key factor needed for the completion of meiosis during sexual reproduction and recovery of viable sexual progeny. The CtlP and Mre11 nuclease complex are essential for accurate processing and repair of double-strand breaks during homologous recombination.

The adaptive benefit of meiosis and self-fertilization in response to starvation appears to be independent of the generation of any new genetic variation in P. tetraurelia. This observation suggests that the underlying molecular mechanism of meiosis provides a fitness advantage regardless of any concomitant effect of sex on genetic diversity.
