= Eurylophella aestiva =

Scientific classification
- Domain: Eukaryota
- Kingdom: Animalia
- Phylum: Arthropoda
- Class: Insecta
- Order: Ephemeroptera
- Family: Ephemerellidae
- Genus: Eurylophella
- Species: E. aestiva

Binomial name
- Eurylophella aestiva (McDunnough, 1931)

Synonyms
- Ephemerella aestiva McDunnough, 1931

Species of mayfly

Eurylophella aestiva is a species of spiny crawler mayfly in the family Ephemerellidae. It is found in North America.
