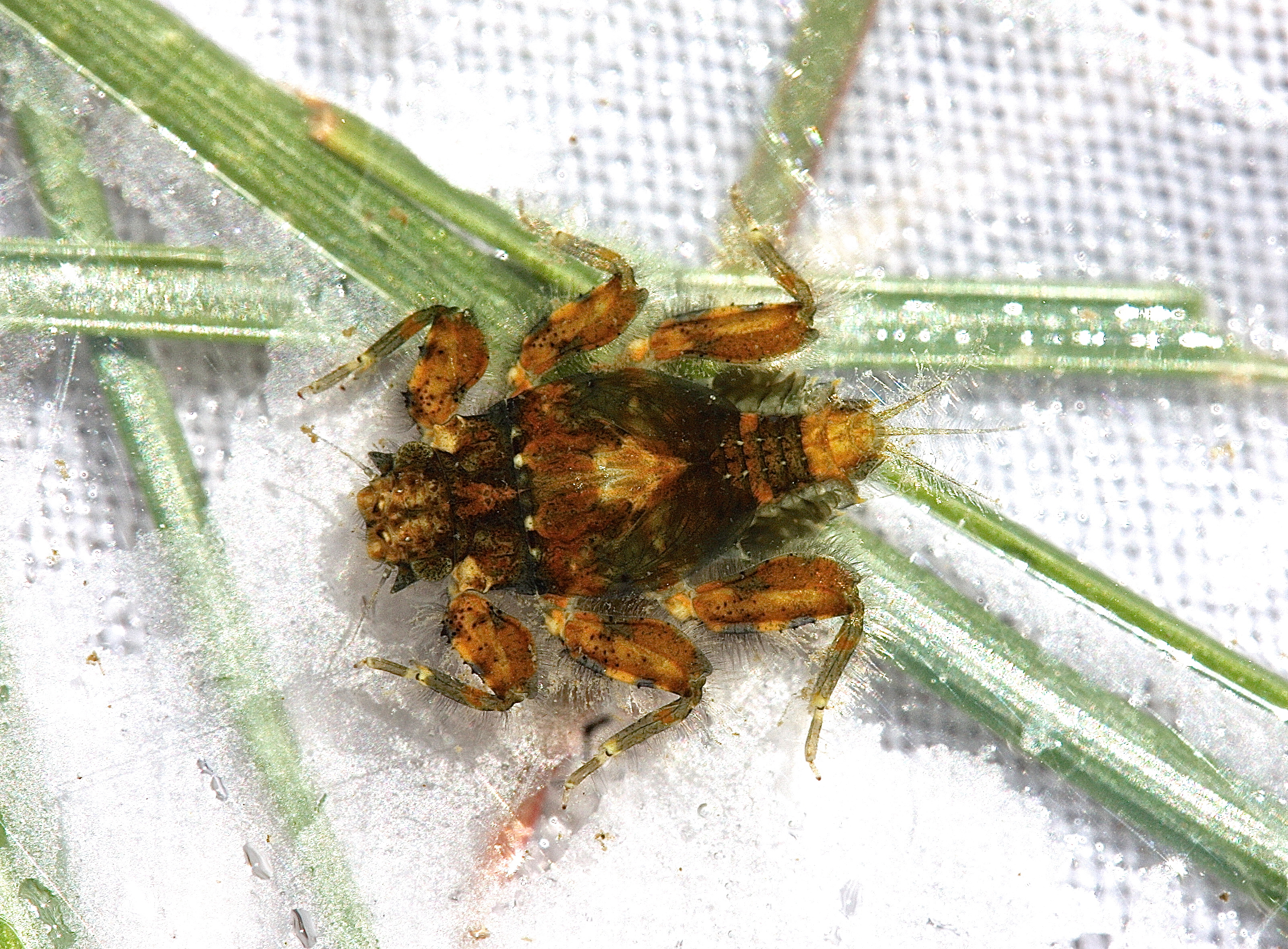

Scientific classification
- Domain: Eukaryota
- Kingdom: Animalia
- Phylum: Arthropoda
- Class: Insecta
- Order: Ephemeroptera
- Family: Ephemerellidae
- Genus: Drunella
- Species: D. walkeri

Binomial name
- Drunella walkeri (Eaton, 1884)

Synonyms
- Drunella wayah (Traver, 1932); Ephemerella bispina Needham, 1905; Ephemerella walkeri Eaton, 1884; Ephemerella wayah Traver, 1932

= Drunella walkeri =

Species of mayfly

Drunella walkeri is a species of spiny crawler mayfly in the family Ephemerellidae. It is found in North America.
