= Serratella micheneri =

Scientific classification
- Domain: Eukaryota
- Kingdom: Animalia
- Phylum: Arthropoda
- Class: Insecta
- Order: Ephemeroptera
- Family: Ephemerellidae
- Genus: Serratella
- Species: S. micheneri

Binomial name
- Serratella micheneri (Traver, 1934)

Synonyms
- Ephemerella altana Allen, 1968; Ephemerella micheneri Traver, 1934

Species of mayfly

Serratella micheneri is a species of spiny crawler mayfly in the family Ephemerellidae. It is found in Central America and North America. In North America its range includes northern Mexico, and the western United States.
