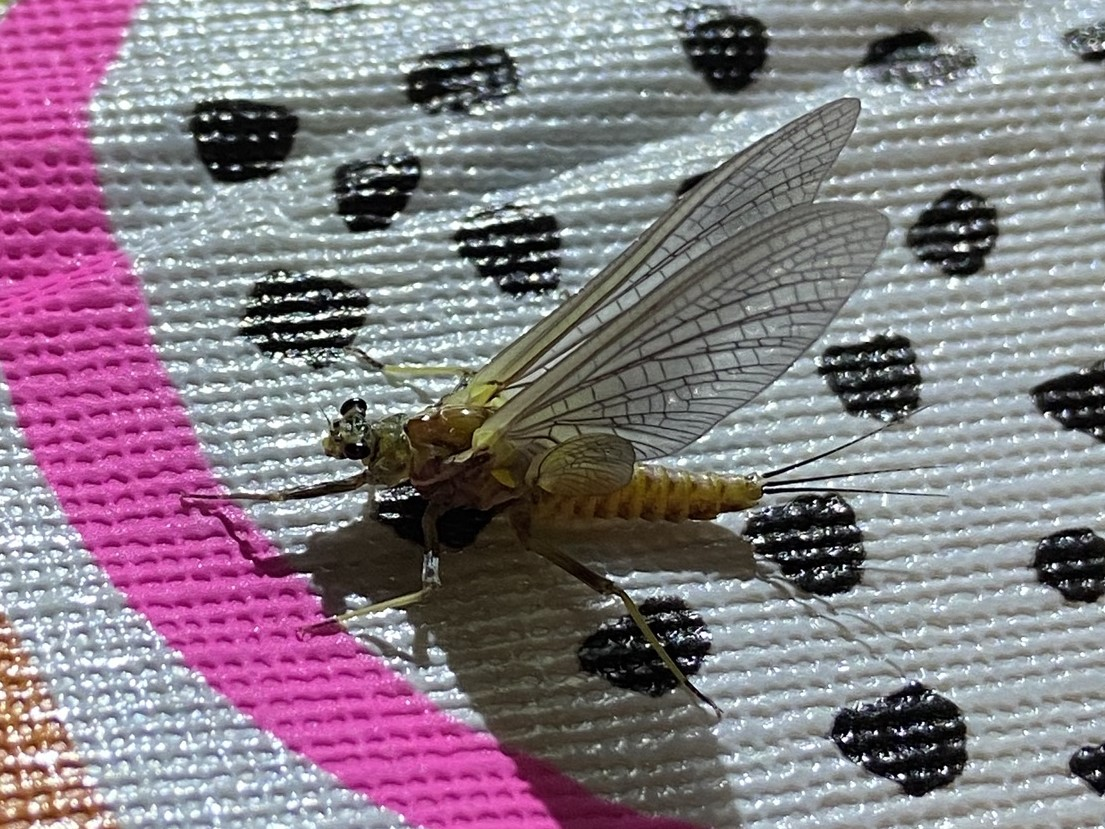

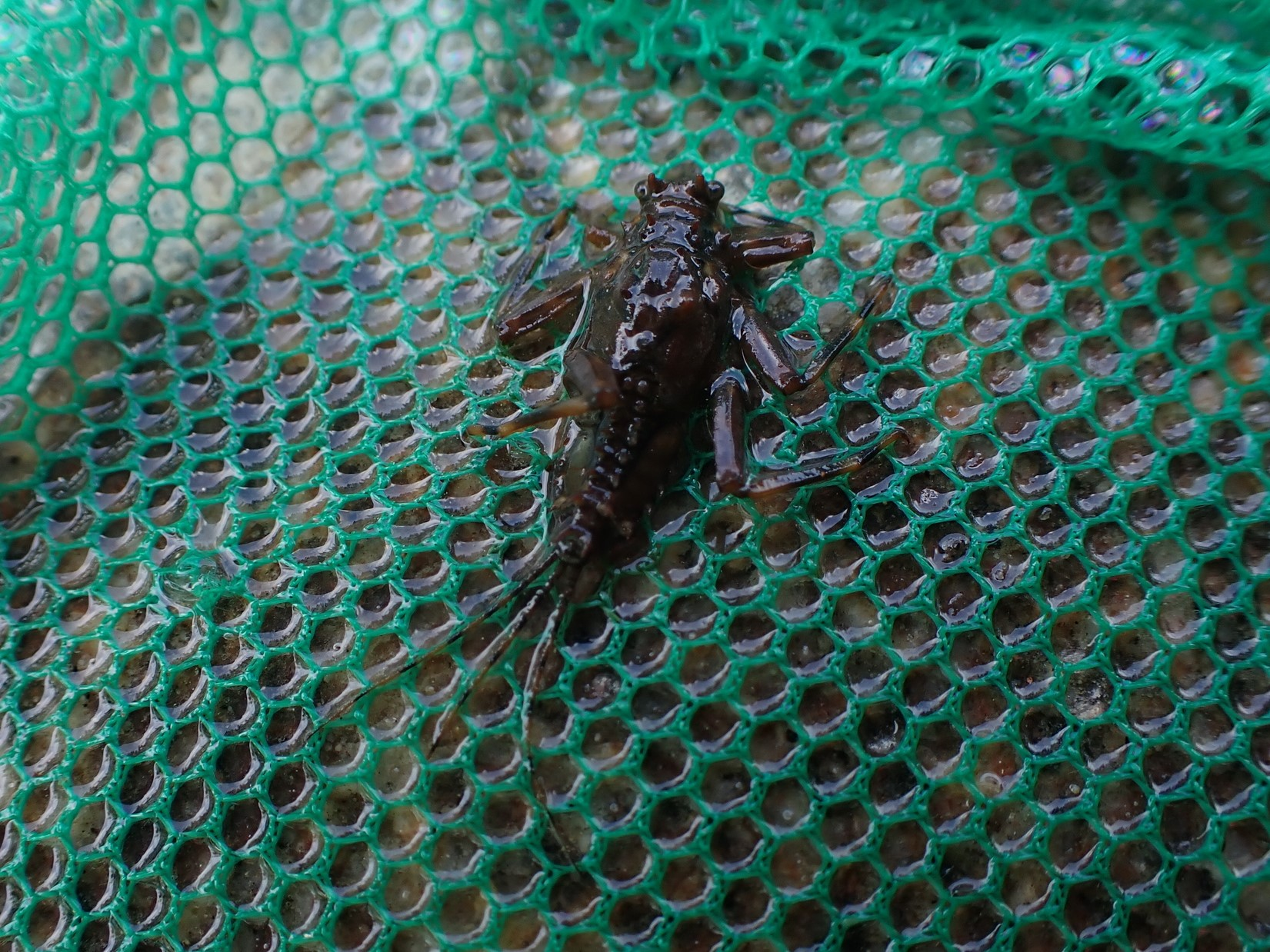
- Adult (top) and larva (bottom)

Scientific classification
- Domain: Eukaryota
- Kingdom: Animalia
- Phylum: Arthropoda
- Class: Insecta
- Order: Ephemeroptera
- Family: Ephemerellidae
- Genus: Drunella
- Species: D. grandis

Binomial name
- Drunella grandis (Eaton, 1884)

Synonyms
- Ephemerella grandis Eaton, 1884

= Drunella grandis =

Species of mayfly

Drunella grandis is a species of spiny crawler mayfly in the family Ephemerellidae. It is found in North America.

== Subspecies ==
These three subspecies belong to the species Drunella grandis:

- Drunella grandis flavitincta (McDunnough, 1934)
- Drunella grandis grandis (Eaton, 1884)
- Drunella grandis ingens (McDunnough, 1934)
