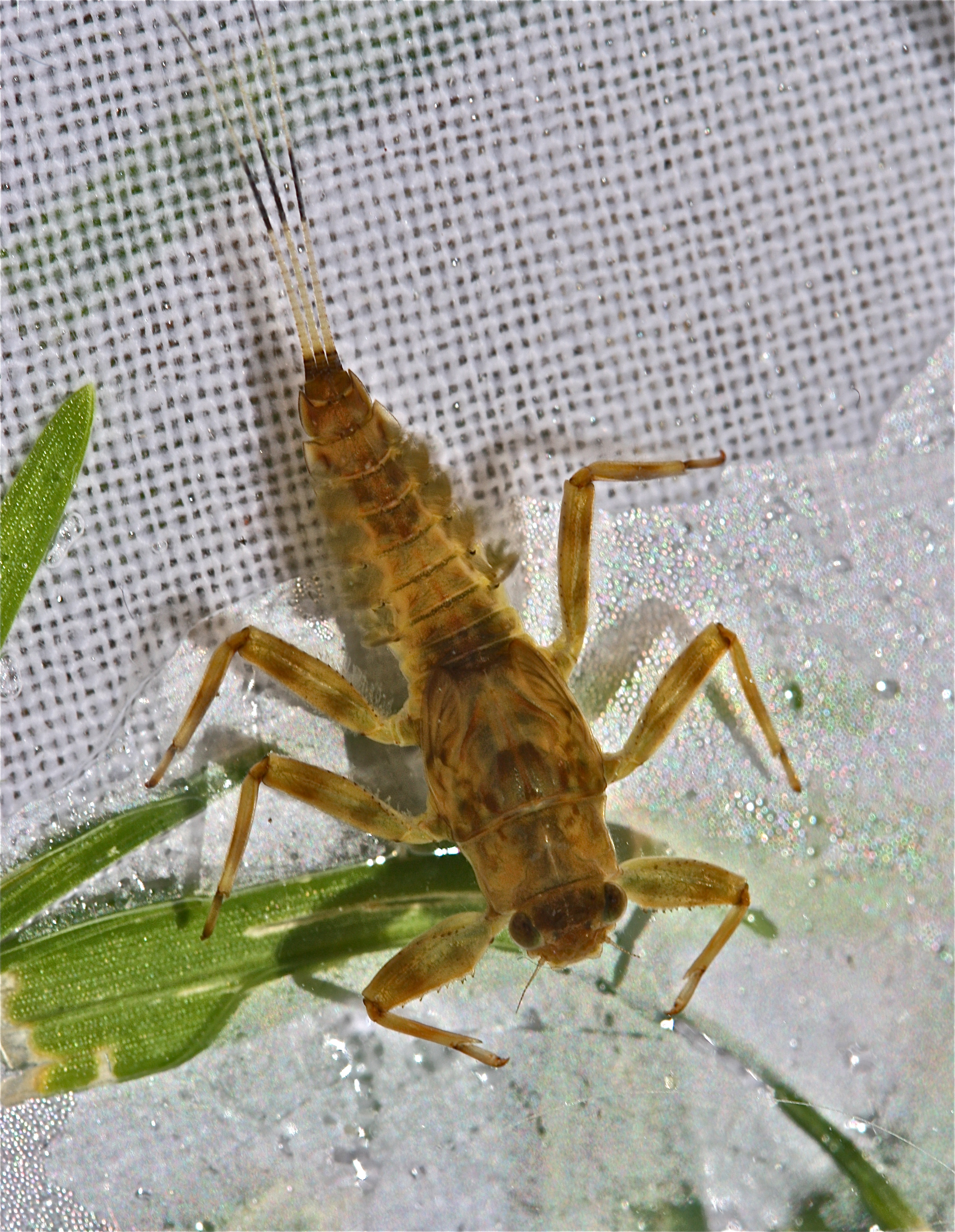

Scientific classification
- Kingdom: Animalia
- Phylum: Arthropoda
- Class: Insecta
- Order: Ephemeroptera
- Family: Ephemerellidae
- Genus: Drunella
- Species: D. coloradensis

Binomial name
- Drunella coloradensis (Dodds, 1923)

Synonyms
- Ephemerella coloradensis Dodds, 1923; Ephemerella wilsoni Mayo, 1952

= Drunella coloradensis =

Species of mayfly

Drunella coloradensis is a species of spiny crawler mayfly in the family Ephemerellidae. It is found in Central America and North America. In North America its range includes southwestern, northern Canada, northern Mexico, the western United States, and Alaska.
