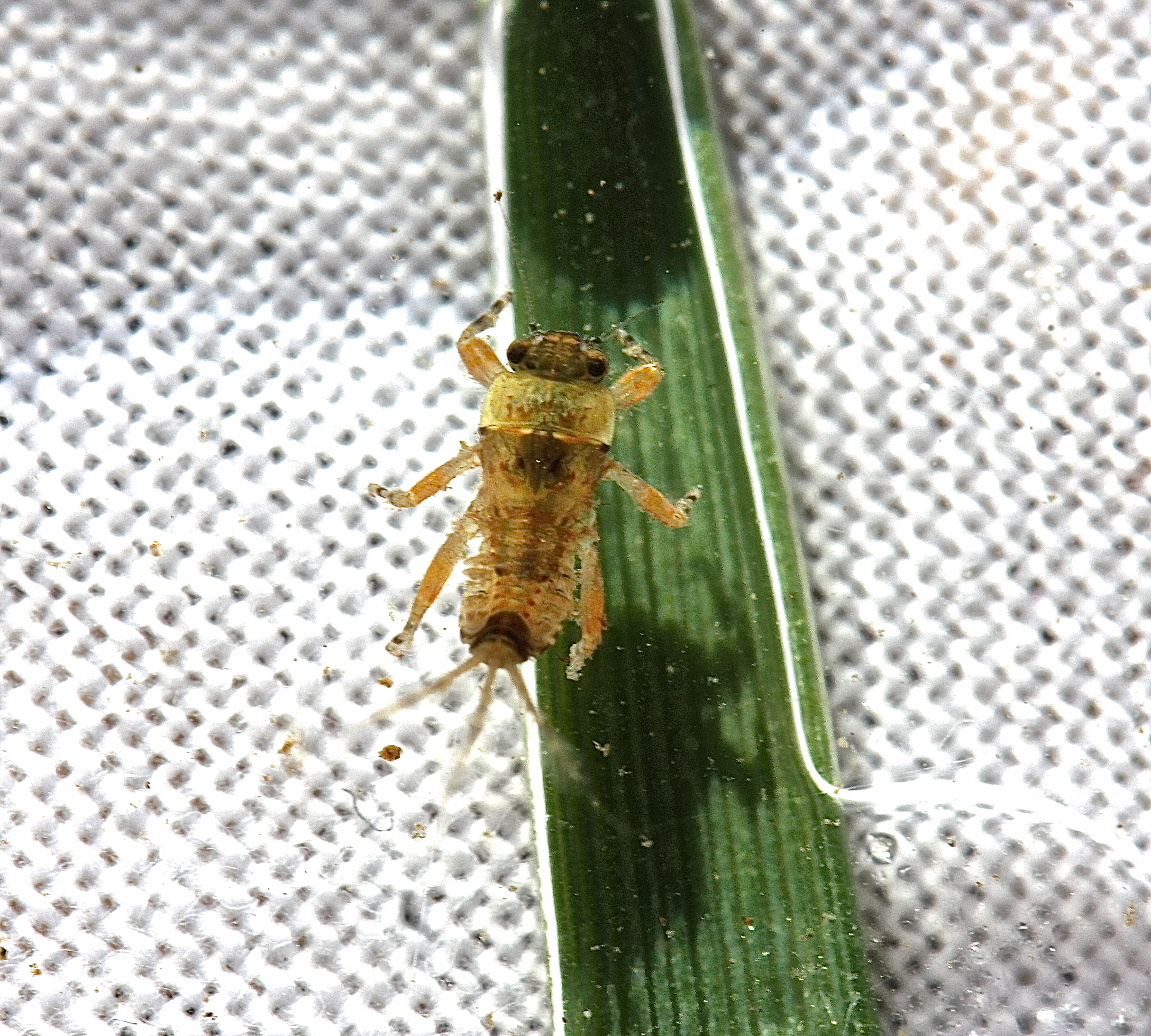
- Ephemerella subvaria (Nymph)

Scientific classification
- Kingdom: Animalia
- Phylum: Arthropoda
- Clade: Pancrustacea
- Class: Insecta
- Order: Ephemeroptera
- Family: Ephemerellidae
- Genus: Ephemerella
- Species: E. subvaria

Binomial name
- Ephemerella subvaria McDunnough, 1931

= Ephemerella subvaria =

Species of mayfly

Ephemerella subvaria, the Hendrickson Mayfly (also known as Red Quill, Dark Hendrickson, and Red Quill Spinner or rarely known as Lady Beaverkill, Beaverkill, Borcher Drake, and Whirling Dun) is a species of spiny crawler mayfly in the family Ephemerellidae.

It is found in North America. In the United States, it can be found in the Midwest, northern parts of the Southeast, Mid-Atlantic, and the Northeast. In Canada, it can be found in Ontario, Quebec, New Brunswick, Nova Scotia, and Newfoundland Island.

Much like other mayflies, it is an indicator species of high quality stream habitat due to a low tolerance level to pollution. This makes the presence of Ephemerella subvaria valuable to local ecosystems.

== Life stages ==
=== Nymph ===
Ephemerella subvaria exists in an immature aquatic stage for most of its life cycle. This stage lasts several years as a nymph compared to its short life span as an adult. Very similar to Ephemerella invaria, the nymphs are quite small and somewhat pale. The nymphs have multiple patches and sections of darker and lighter shades. Tergites 6 and 7 can be entirely pale, tergite 5 has a somewhat triangular dark patch on its midsection, and tergites 8 and 9 are consistently dark. They also have dorsal spines on the abdomen.

=== Subimago ===
The subimago, or dun, is an immature final stage of a nymph, resembling an adult, which is able to fly. It is duller in its color and sexually immature. These duns have three tails. The males are known for having large somewhat red eyes and a dark reddish, rusty color on its abdomen, hence one of its more regularly used common names Red Quill. The females are larger in size, have smaller pink eyes, and duller color, being more of a grey-brown to olive than a dark red.

=== Imago ===
The imago, or spinner, is the adult stage. It exhibits full color and size, and is able to reproduce. The adult males are fairly consistent with the male duns, keeping dark rusty red and large reddish eyes. The adult females are a dark brown, and are larger than the males.

== Biology ==
=== Life Cycle ===
Ephemerella subvaria, while able to live several years as a nymph, typically has a one-year life cycle. It starts with the hatching in late winter, allowing the nymphs to slowly grow. Depending on the local climate, the emergence of the adults can vary, though in the northern parts of the midwest United States, the adults will emerge within April and early May, following the first warm days of the season with water temperatures of mid 40 to 50 degrees Fahrenheit.

The emergence of the adults starts the mating swarm. Within spring, the adults will emerge with the only purpose being to mate.

=== Ecology ===
Ephemerella subvaria nymphs are known to be found in the gravel bottoms of cool, shallow, and fast moving sections of freshwater riparian streams. Once the nymphs emerge from the steam as subimagos and adults, they typically stay within range of the same type of fast moving stream habitat so they are able to mate and lay eggs in the water.

Mayflies are very sensitive to pollution, only being found in high-quality, minimally polluted waters. This gives mayflies an important role in the local ecosystem, being one of the most common indicators of a healthy body of water. Ephemerella subvaria, being one of the more common mayflies in its regions, holds that same role.

Mayflies, including Ephemerella subvaria, are also notable detritivores and herbivores, breaking down decaying plants and algae.

They provide a food source for trout in the rivers they occupy. Trout will target nymphs and emerging subimagos during mating season. This also provides an opportunity for fishers to catch trout while they are looking for the mayfly nymphs.
