= Drunella lata =

Scientific classification
- Domain: Eukaryota
- Kingdom: Animalia
- Phylum: Arthropoda
- Class: Insecta
- Order: Ephemeroptera
- Family: Ephemerellidae
- Genus: Drunella
- Species: D. lata

Binomial name
- Drunella lata (Morgan, 1911)

Synonyms
- Drunella longicornis (Traver, 1932); Ephemerella inflata McDunnough, 1926; Ephemerella lata Morgan, 1911; Ephemerella longicornis Traver, 1932; Eurylophella longicornis (Traver, 1932)

Species of mayfly

Drunella lata is a species of spiny crawler mayfly in the family Ephemerellidae. It is found in North America.
