= Drunella cornuta =

Scientific classification
- Domain: Eukaryota
- Kingdom: Animalia
- Phylum: Arthropoda
- Class: Insecta
- Order: Ephemeroptera
- Family: Ephemerellidae
- Genus: Drunella
- Species: D. cornuta

Binomial name
- Drunella cornuta (Morgan, 1911)

Synonyms
- Ephemerella cornuta Morgan, 1911; Ephemerella depressa Ide, 1930

Species of mayfly

Drunella cornuta is a species of spiny crawler mayfly in the family Ephemerellidae. It is found in North America.
