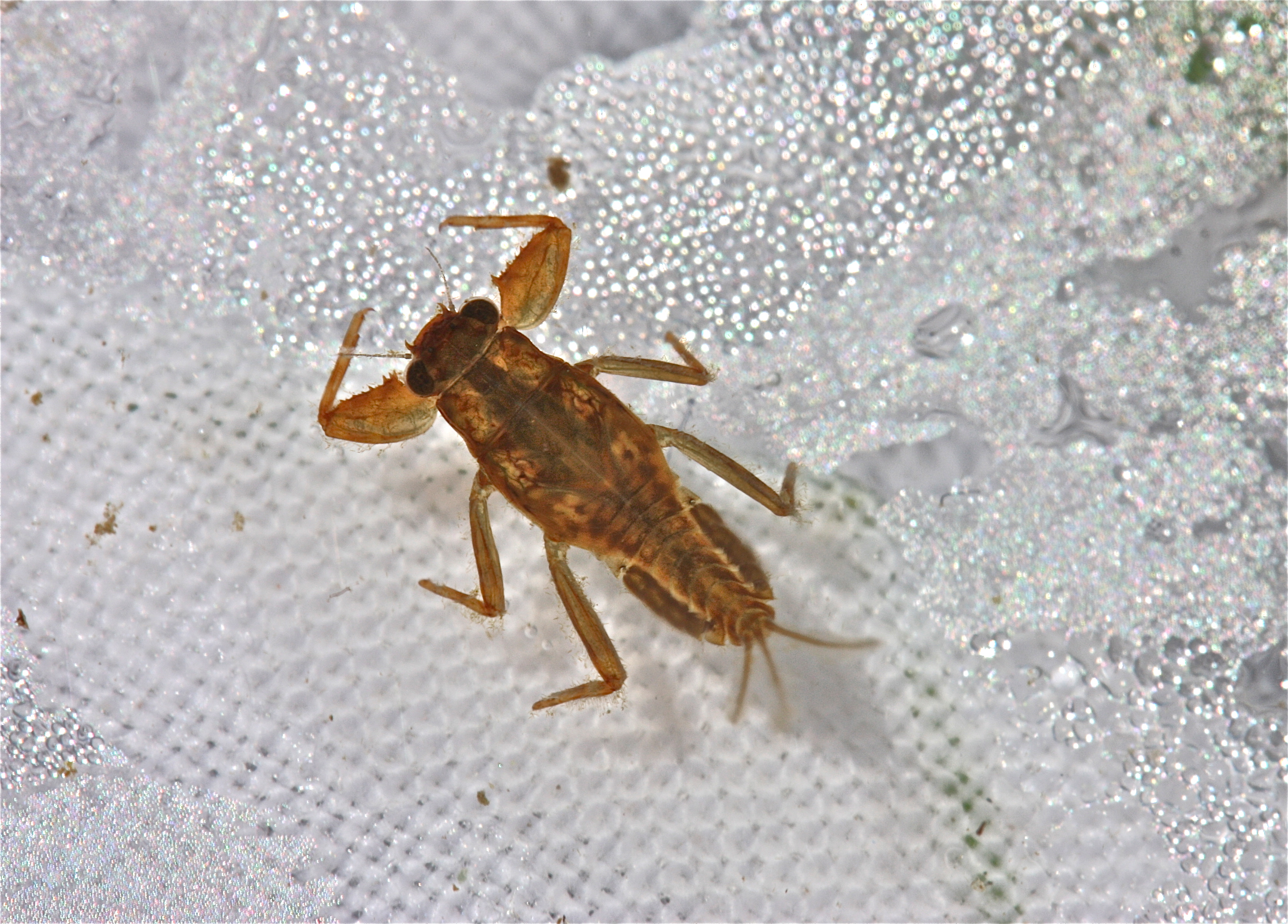

Scientific classification
- Domain: Eukaryota
- Kingdom: Animalia
- Phylum: Arthropoda
- Class: Insecta
- Order: Ephemeroptera
- Family: Ephemerellidae
- Genus: Drunella
- Species: D. cornutella

Binomial name
- Drunella cornutella (McDunnough, 1931)

Synonyms
- Ephemerella cornutella McDunnough, 1931

= Drunella cornutella =

Species of mayfly

Drunella cornutella is a species of spiny crawler mayfly in the family Ephemerellidae. It is found in North America.
