= Ephemerella aurivillii =

Scientific classification
- Domain: Eukaryota
- Kingdom: Animalia
- Phylum: Arthropoda
- Class: Insecta
- Order: Ephemeroptera
- Family: Ephemerellidae
- Genus: Ephemerella
- Species: E. aurivillii

Binomial name
- Ephemerella aurivillii (Bengtsson, 1908)

Synonyms
- Chitonophora aurivillii Bengtsson, 1908; Cincticostella ezoensis (Gose, 1980); Ephemerella aronii Eaton in Esben-Petersen, 1908; Ephemerella concinnata Traver, 1934; Ephemerella ezoensis Gose, 1980; Ephemerella norda McDunnough, 1924; Ephemerella taeniata Tshernova, 1952

Species of mayfly

Ephemerella aurivillii is a species of spiny crawler mayfly in the family Ephemerellidae. It is found in Europem, Northern Asia (excluding China) and North America. In North America its range includes all of Canada, the northern, southwestern United States, and Alaska.
