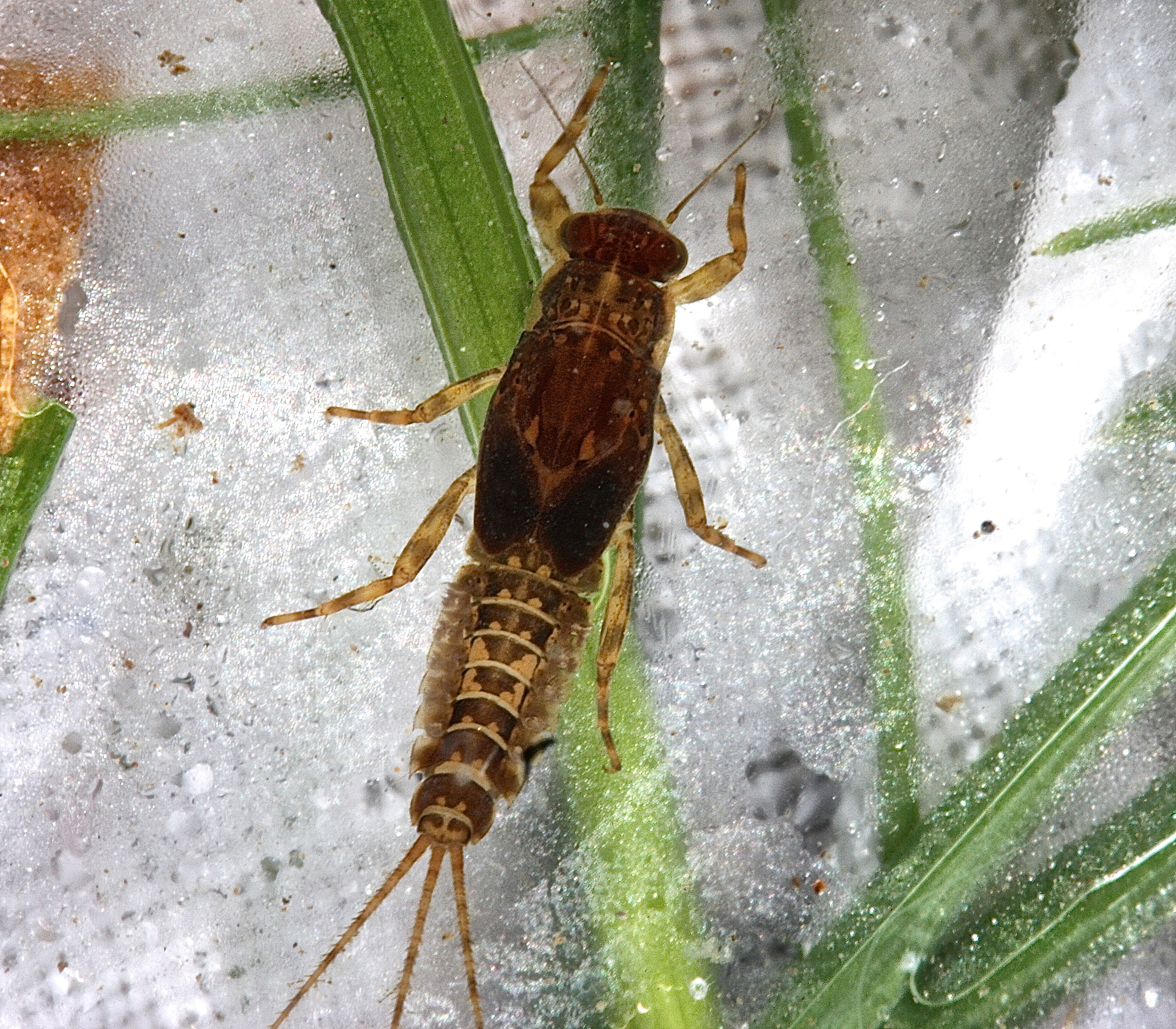

Scientific classification
- Domain: Eukaryota
- Kingdom: Animalia
- Phylum: Arthropoda
- Class: Insecta
- Order: Ephemeroptera
- Family: Ephemerellidae
- Genus: Ephemerella
- Species: E. dorothea

Binomial name
- Ephemerella dorothea Needham, 1908

= Ephemerella dorothea =

Species of mayfly

Ephemerella dorothea is a species of spiny crawler mayfly in the family Ephemerellidae. It is found in North America.

== Subspecies ==
These two subspecies belong to the species Ephemerella dorothea:

- Ephemerella dorothea dorothea Needham, 1908
- Ephemerella dorothea infrequens McDunnough, 1924
