= Drunella spinifera =

Scientific classification
- Domain: Eukaryota
- Kingdom: Animalia
- Phylum: Arthropoda
- Class: Insecta
- Order: Ephemeroptera
- Family: Ephemerellidae
- Genus: Drunella
- Species: D. spinifera

Binomial name
- Drunella spinifera (Needham, 1927)

Synonyms
- Ephemerella autumnalis McDunnough, 1934; Ephemerella sierra Mayo, 1952; Ephemerella spinifera Needham, 1927

Species of mayfly

Drunella spinifera is a species of spiny crawler mayfly in the family Ephemerellidae. It is found in southwestern and northern Canada and the western United States and Alaska.
