= Drunella flavilinea =

Scientific classification
- Domain: Eukaryota
- Kingdom: Animalia
- Phylum: Arthropoda
- Class: Insecta
- Order: Ephemeroptera
- Family: Ephemerellidae
- Genus: Drunella
- Species: D. flavilinea

Binomial name
- Drunella flavilinea (McDunnough, 1926)

Synonyms
- Ephemerella flavilinea McDunnough, 1926; Ephemerella lapidula McDunnough, 1935

Species of mayfly

Drunella flavilinea is a species of spiny crawler mayfly in the family Ephemerellidae. It is found in Central America and North America. In North America its range includes southwestern, northern Canada, northern Mexico, and the western United States.
