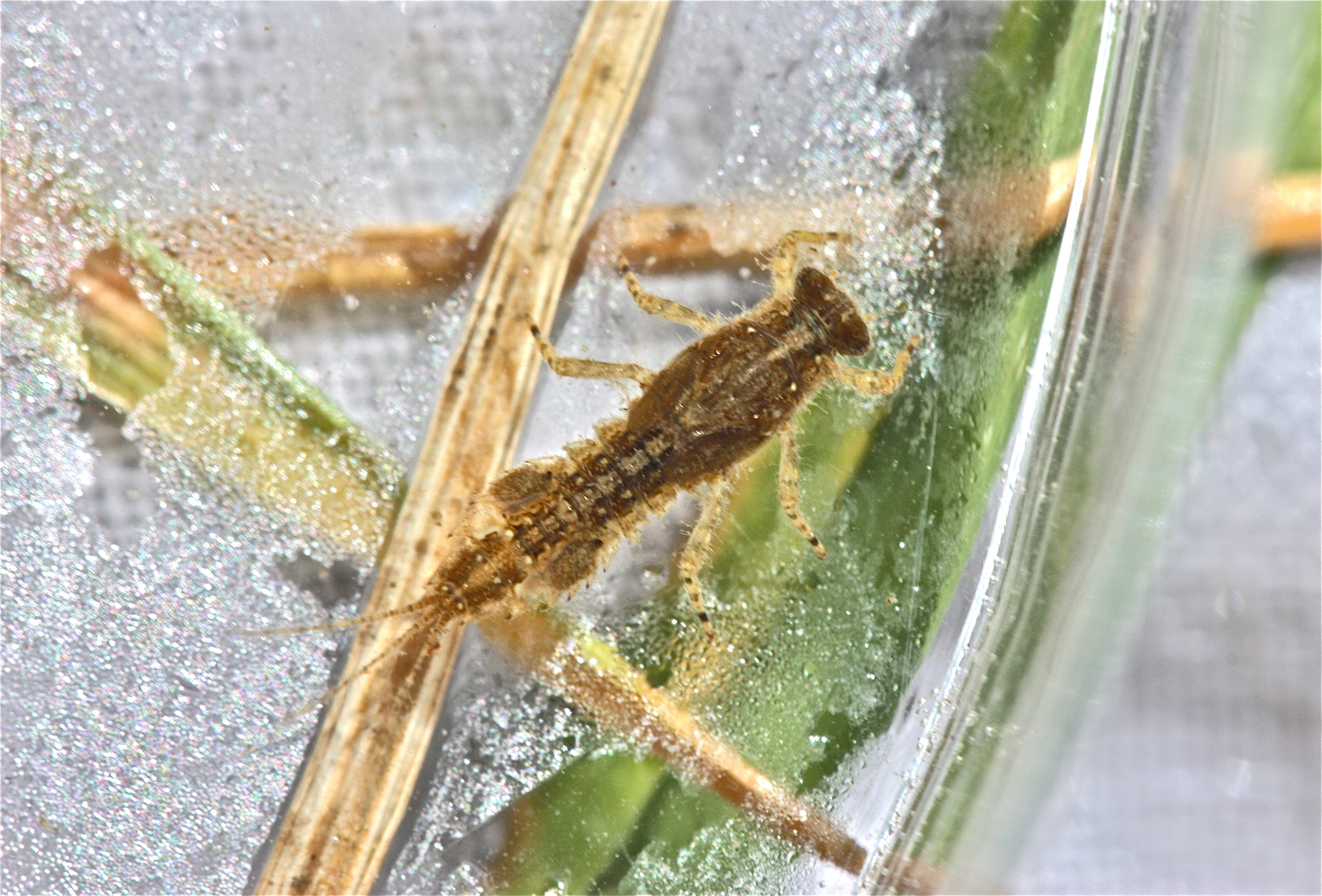

Scientific classification
- Domain: Eukaryota
- Kingdom: Animalia
- Phylum: Arthropoda
- Class: Insecta
- Order: Ephemeroptera
- Family: Ephemerellidae
- Genus: Eurylophella
- Species: E. verisimilis

Binomial name
- Eurylophella verisimilis (McDunnough, 1930)

Synonyms
- Ephemerella verisimilis McDunnough, 1930

= Eurylophella verisimilis =

Species of mayfly

Eurylophella verisimilis is a species of spiny crawler mayfly in the family Ephemerellidae. It is found in North America.
