= Attenella margarita =

Scientific classification
- Domain: Eukaryota
- Kingdom: Animalia
- Phylum: Arthropoda
- Class: Insecta
- Order: Ephemeroptera
- Family: Ephemerellidae
- Genus: Attenella
- Species: A. margarita

Binomial name
- Attenella margarita (Needham, 1927)

Synonyms
- Ephemerella margarita Needham, 1927

Species of mayfly

Attenella margarita is a species of spiny crawler Mayfly in the family Ephemerellidae. It is found in the southern half of Canada and the continental United States.
