= Attenella delantala =

Scientific classification
- Domain: Eukaryota
- Kingdom: Animalia
- Phylum: Arthropoda
- Class: Insecta
- Order: Ephemeroptera
- Family: Ephemerellidae
- Genus: Attenella
- Species: A. delantala

Binomial name
- Attenella delantala (Mayo, 1952)

Synonyms
- Ephemerella delantala Mayo, 1952

Species of mayfly

Attenella delantala is a species of spiny crawler mayfly in the family Ephemerellidae. It is found in the western United States.
