= Drunella pelosa =

Scientific classification
- Domain: Eukaryota
- Kingdom: Animalia
- Phylum: Arthropoda
- Class: Insecta
- Order: Ephemeroptera
- Family: Ephemerellidae
- Genus: Drunella
- Species: D. pelosa

Binomial name
- Drunella pelosa (Mayo, 1951)

Synonyms
- Ephemerella pelosa Mayo, 1951

Species of mayfly

Drunella pelosa is a species of spiny crawler mayfly in the family Ephemerellidae. It is found in North America.
