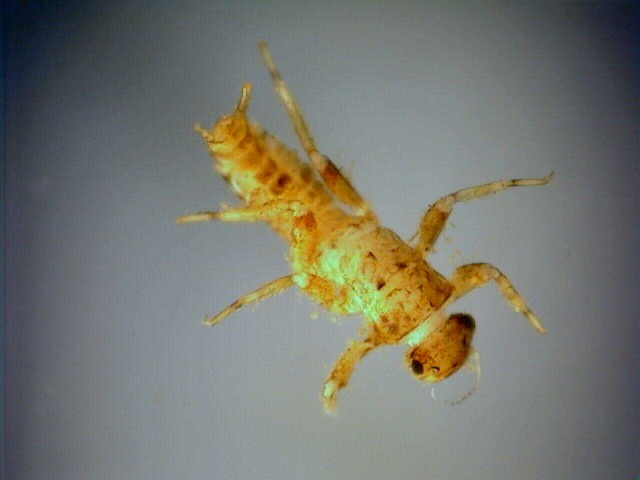

Scientific classification
- Domain: Eukaryota
- Kingdom: Animalia
- Phylum: Arthropoda
- Class: Insecta
- Order: Ephemeroptera
- Family: Ephemerellidae
- Genus: Teloganopsis
- Species: T. deficiens

Binomial name
- Teloganopsis deficiens (Morgan, 1911)

Synonyms
- Ephemerella atrescens McDunnough, 1925; Ephemerella deficiens Morgan, 1911

= Teloganopsis deficiens =

Species of mayfly

Teloganopsis deficiens, the little black quill, is a species of spiny crawler mayfly in the family Ephemerellidae. It is found in North America.
