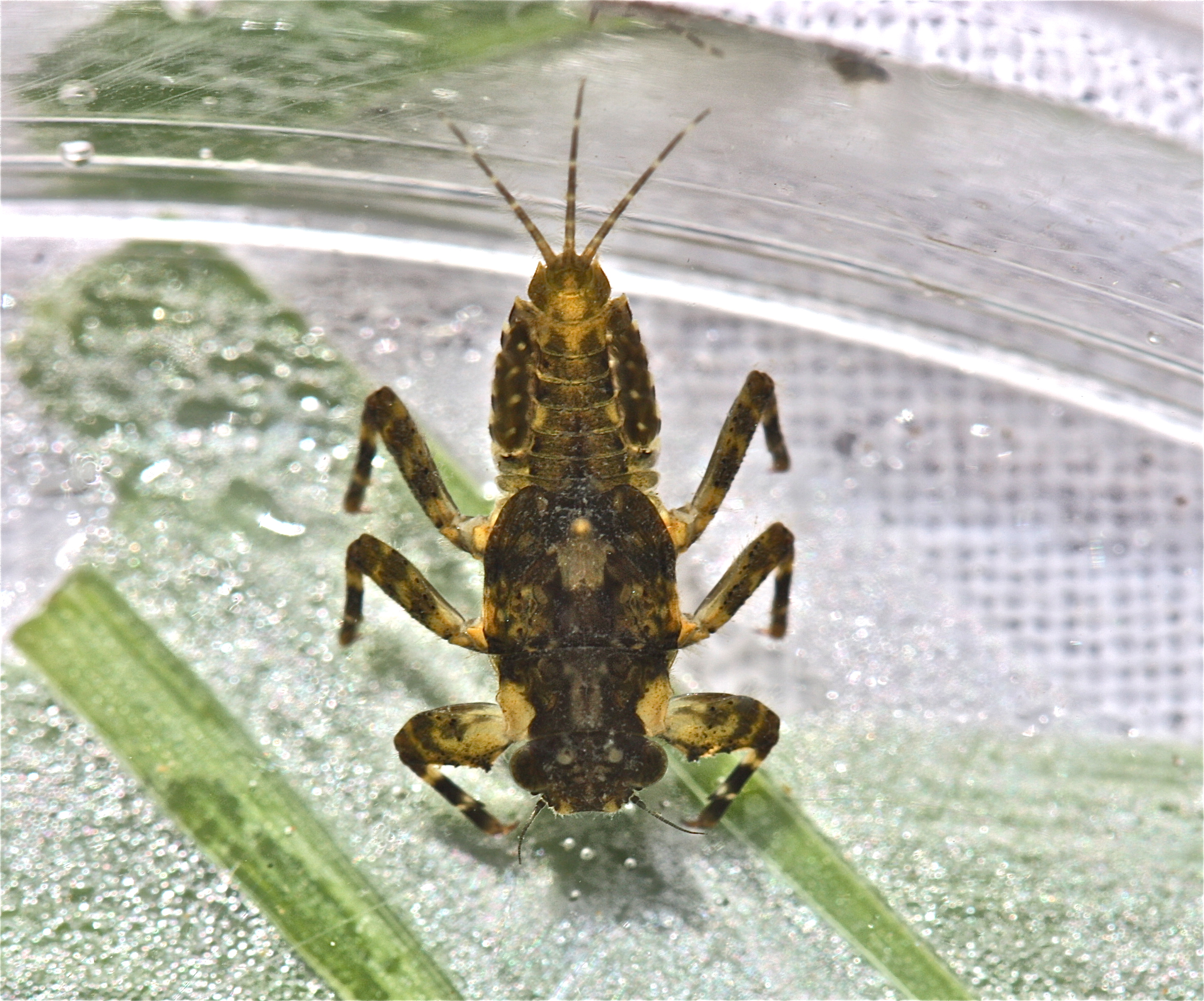

Scientific classification
- Domain: Eukaryota
- Kingdom: Animalia
- Phylum: Arthropoda
- Class: Insecta
- Order: Ephemeroptera
- Family: Ephemerellidae
- Genus: Drunella
- Species: D. tuberculata

Binomial name
- Drunella tuberculata (Morgan, 1911)

Synonyms
- Drunella conestee (Traver, 1932); Ephemerella cherokee Traver, 1937; Ephemerella conestee Traver, 1932; Ephemerella tuberculata Morgan, 1911

= Drunella tuberculata =

Species of mayfly

Drunella tuberculata is a species of spiny crawler mayfly in the family Ephemerellidae. It is found in North America.
