= Ephemerella excrucians =

Scientific classification
- Domain: Eukaryota
- Kingdom: Animalia
- Phylum: Arthropoda
- Class: Insecta
- Order: Ephemeroptera
- Family: Ephemerellidae
- Genus: Ephemerella
- Species: E. excrucians

Binomial name
- Ephemerella excrucians Walsh, 1862

Synonyms
- Ephemerella argo Eaton, 1884; Ephemerella crenula Burks, 1947; Ephemerella inermis Allen and Edmunds, 1965; Ephemerella lacustris McDunnough, 1926; Ephemerella ora Allen and Edmunds, 1965; Ephemerella rama Burks, 1949; Ephemerella rossi Allen, 1968; Ephemerella semiflava Allen and Edmunds, 1965

Species of mayfly

Ephemerella excrucians, the pale morning dun, is a species of spiny crawler mayfly in the family Ephemerellidae. It is found in all of Canada and the continental United States.
