= Serratella levis =

Scientific classification
- Domain: Eukaryota
- Kingdom: Animalia
- Phylum: Arthropoda
- Class: Insecta
- Order: Ephemeroptera
- Family: Ephemerellidae
- Genus: Serratella
- Species: S. levis

Binomial name
- Serratella levis (Day, 1954)

Synonyms
- Ephemerella levis Day, 1954

Species of mayfly

Serratella levis is a species of spiny crawler mayfly in the family Ephemerellidae. It is found in North America.
