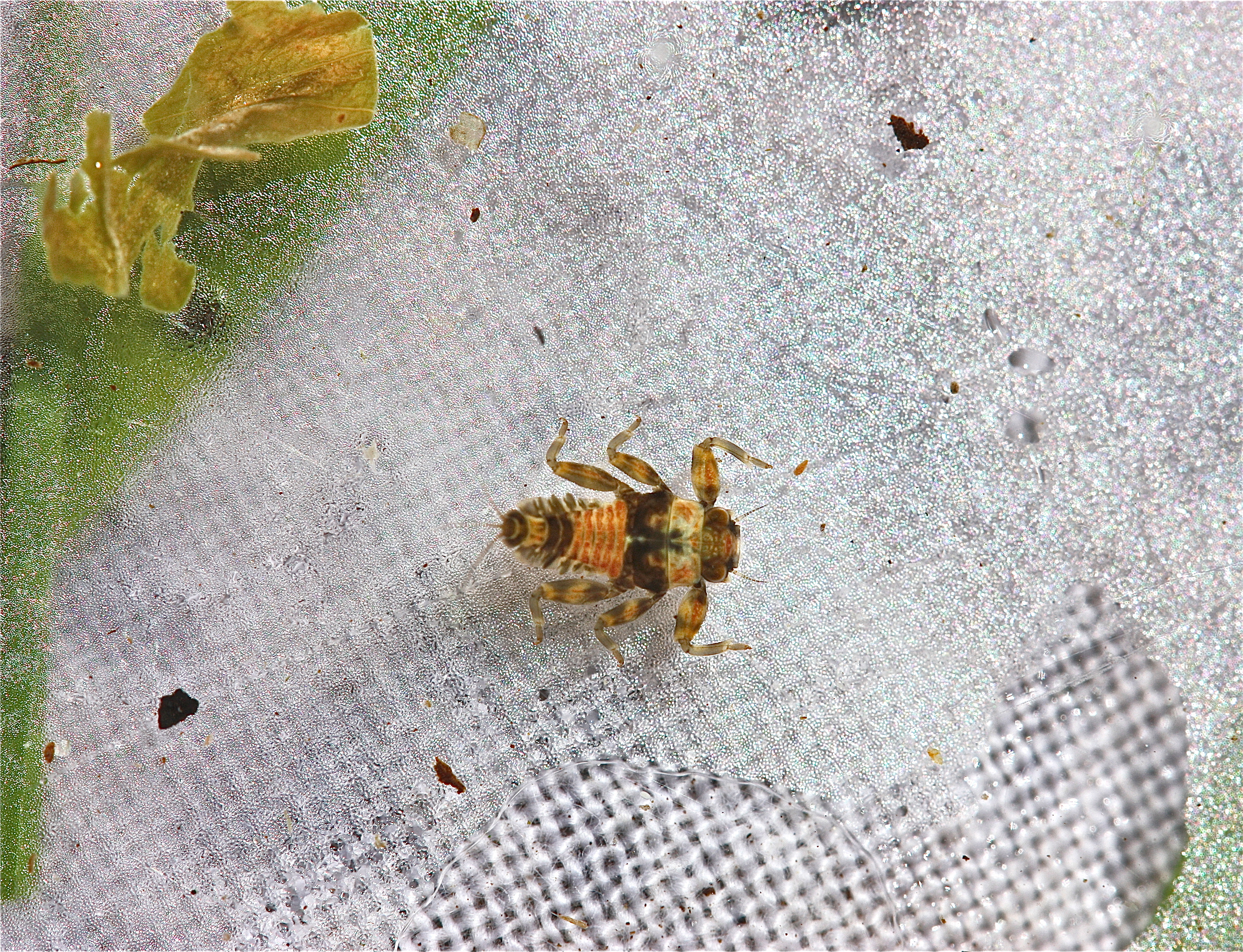

Scientific classification
- Domain: Eukaryota
- Kingdom: Animalia
- Phylum: Arthropoda
- Class: Insecta
- Order: Ephemeroptera
- Family: Ephemerellidae
- Genus: Drunella
- Species: D. doddsii

Binomial name
- Drunella doddsii (Needham, 1927)

Synonyms
- Ephemerella doddsii Needham, 1927

= Drunella doddsii =

Species of mayfly

Drunella doddsii is a species of spiny crawler mayfly in the family Ephemerellidae.
