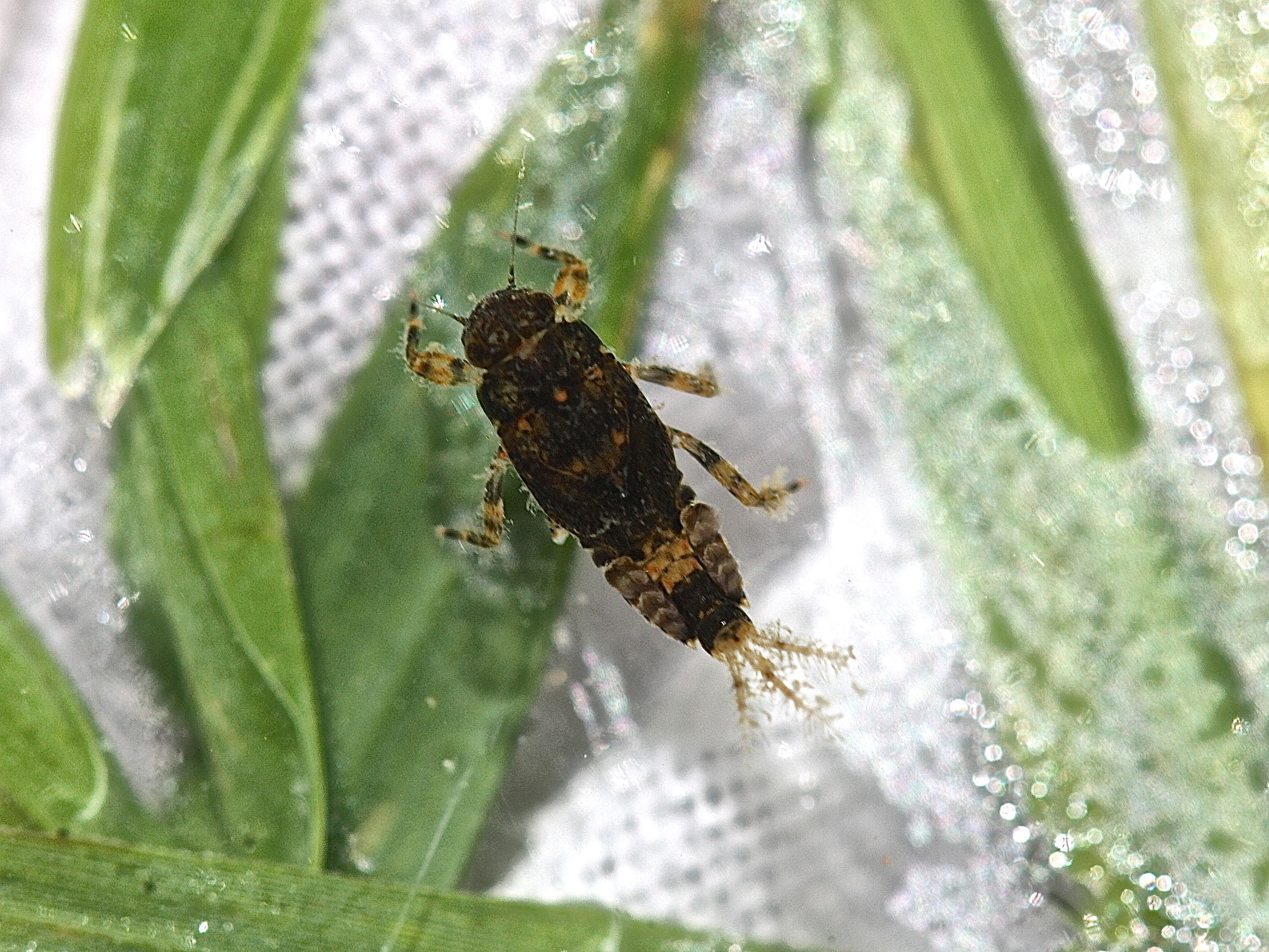

Scientific classification
- Domain: Eukaryota
- Kingdom: Animalia
- Phylum: Arthropoda
- Class: Insecta
- Order: Ephemeroptera
- Family: Ephemerellidae
- Genus: Serratella
- Species: S. serrata

Binomial name
- Serratella serrata (Morgan, 1911)

Synonyms
- Ephemerella carolina Berner and Allen, 1961; Ephemerella serrata Morgan, 1911; Ephemerella sordida McDunnough, 1925; Ephemerella spiculosa Berner and Allen, 1961; Serratella carolina (Berner and Allen, 1961); Serratella sordida (McDunnough, 1925); Serratella spiculosa (Berner and Allen, 1961)

= Serratella serrata =

Species of mayfly

Serratella serrata is a species of spiny crawler mayfly in the family Ephemerellidae. It is found in North America.
