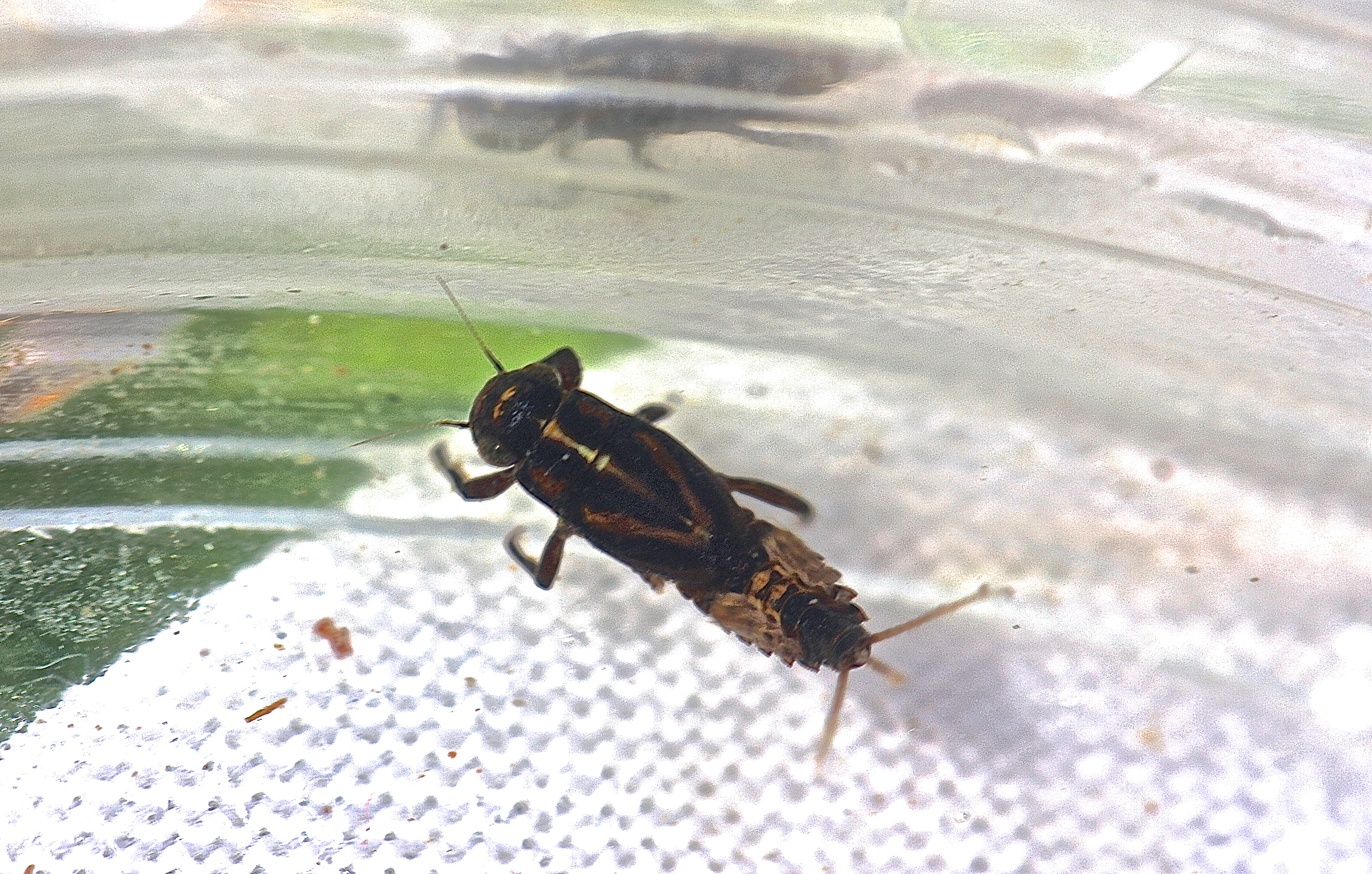

Scientific classification
- Domain: Eukaryota
- Kingdom: Animalia
- Phylum: Arthropoda
- Class: Insecta
- Order: Ephemeroptera
- Family: Ephemerellidae
- Genus: Serratella
- Species: S. serratoides

Binomial name
- Serratella serratoides (McDunnough, 1931)

Synonyms
- Ephemerella serratoides McDunnough, 1931

= Serratella serratoides =

Species of mayfly

Serratella serratoides is a species of spiny crawler mayfly in the family Ephemerellidae. It is found in North America.
