= Ephemerella maculata =

Scientific classification
- Domain: Eukaryota
- Kingdom: Animalia
- Phylum: Arthropoda
- Class: Insecta
- Order: Ephemeroptera
- Family: Ephemerellidae
- Genus: Ephemerella
- Species: E. maculata

Binomial name
- Ephemerella maculata Traver, 1934

Synonyms
- Ephemerella euterpe Traver, 1934

Species of mayfly

Ephemerella maculata is a species of spiny crawler mayfly in the family Ephemerellidae. It is found in North America.
