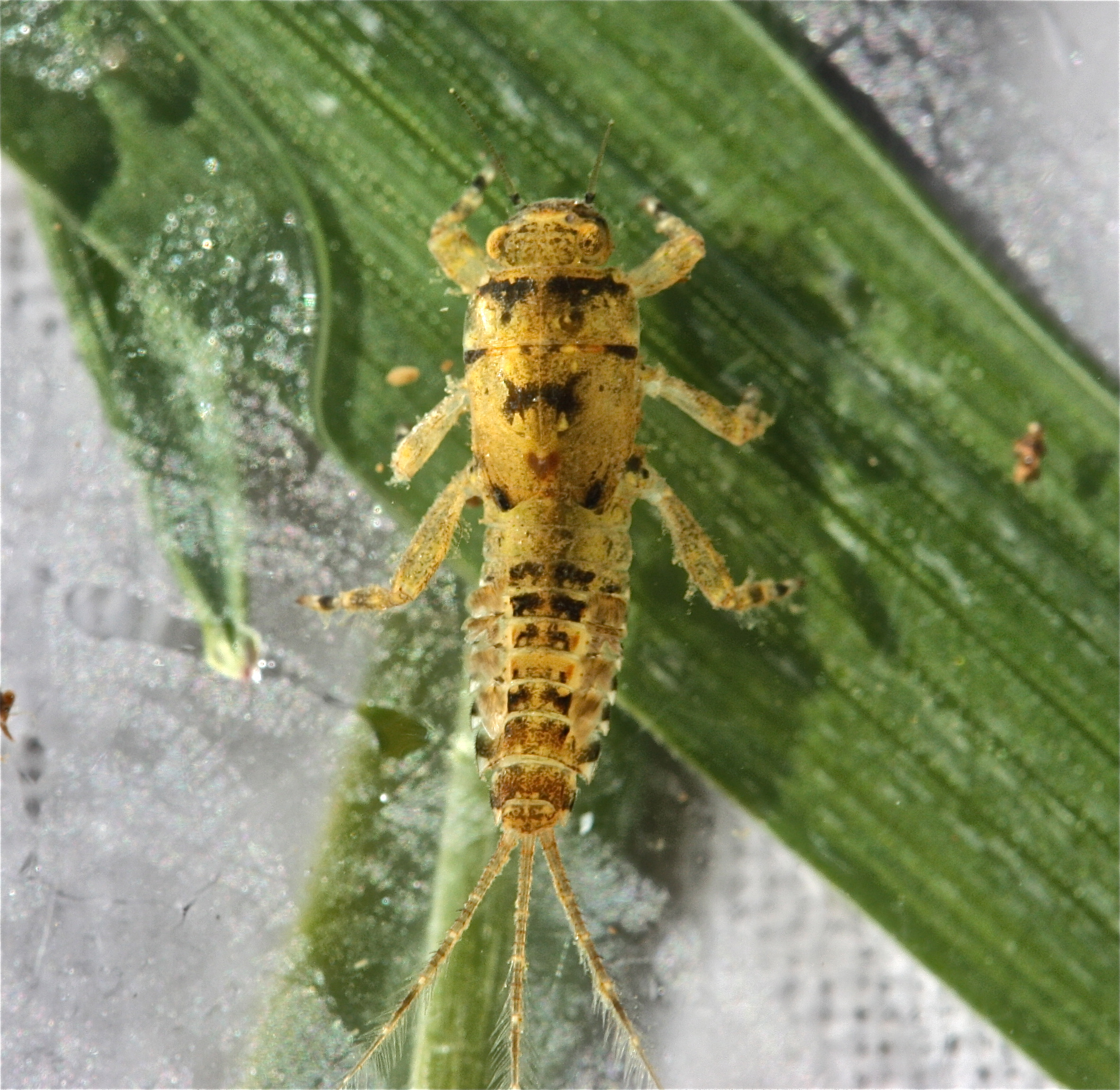

Scientific classification
- Domain: Eukaryota
- Kingdom: Animalia
- Phylum: Arthropoda
- Class: Insecta
- Order: Ephemeroptera
- Family: Ephemerellidae
- Genus: Ephemerella
- Species: E. invaria

Binomial name
- Ephemerella invaria (Walker, 1853)

Synonyms
- Baetis invaria Walker, 1853; Chitonophora vernalis (Banks, 1914); Ephemerella choctawhatchee Berner, 1946; Ephemerella feminina Needham, 1924; Ephemerella floripara McCafferty, 1985; Ephemerella fratercula McDunnough, 1925; Ephemerella inconstans Traver, 1932; Ephemerella rotunda Morgan, 1911; Ephemerella simila Allen and Edmunds, 1965; Ephemerella vernalis Banks, 1914

= Ephemerella invaria =

Species of mayfly

Ephemerella invaria, the sulphur dun, is a species of spiny crawler mayfly in the family Ephemerellidae. It is found in southeastern and northern Canada and the eastern United States.
