= Eurylophella karelica =

Scientific classification
- Domain: Eukaryota
- Kingdom: Animalia
- Phylum: Arthropoda
- Class: Insecta
- Order: Ephemeroptera
- Family: Ephemerellidae
- Genus: Eurylophella
- Species: E. karelica

Binomial name
- Eurylophella karelica Tiensuu, 1935

Species of insect

Eurylophella karelica is a species of Eurylophella.

It is native to Eastern Europe.

Synonym: Ephemerella karelica Tiensuu
