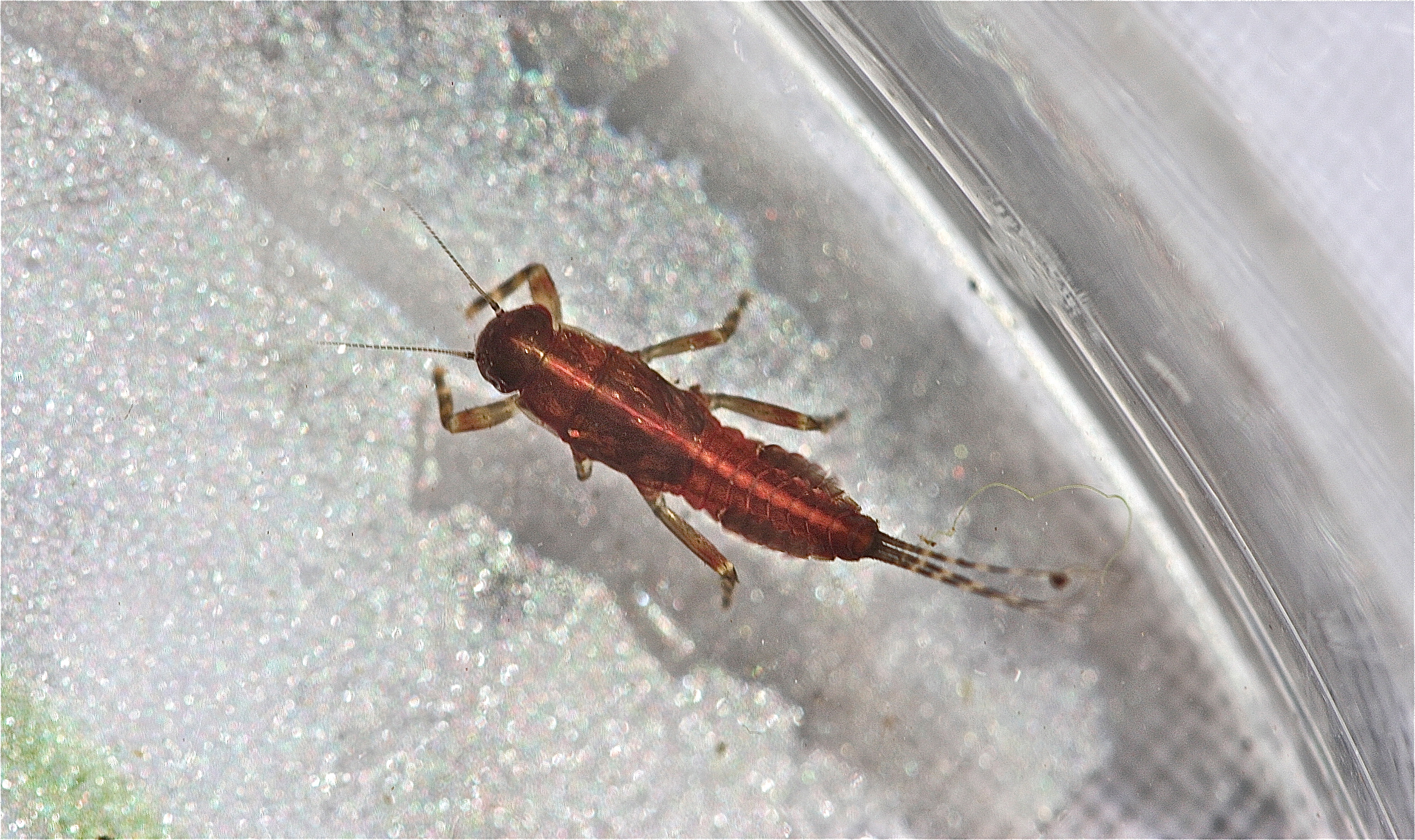

Scientific classification
- Domain: Eukaryota
- Kingdom: Animalia
- Phylum: Arthropoda
- Class: Insecta
- Order: Ephemeroptera
- Family: Ephemerellidae
- Genus: Ephemerella
- Species: E. tibialis

Binomial name
- Ephemerella tibialis McDunnough, 1924

Synonyms
- Ephemerella angusta Traver, 1934; Ephemerella sequoia Allen and Collins, 1968; Serratella sequoia (Allen and Collins, 1968)

= Ephemerella tibialis =

Species of mayfly

Ephemerella tibialis is a species of spiny crawler mayfly in the family Ephemerellidae. It is found in North America.
