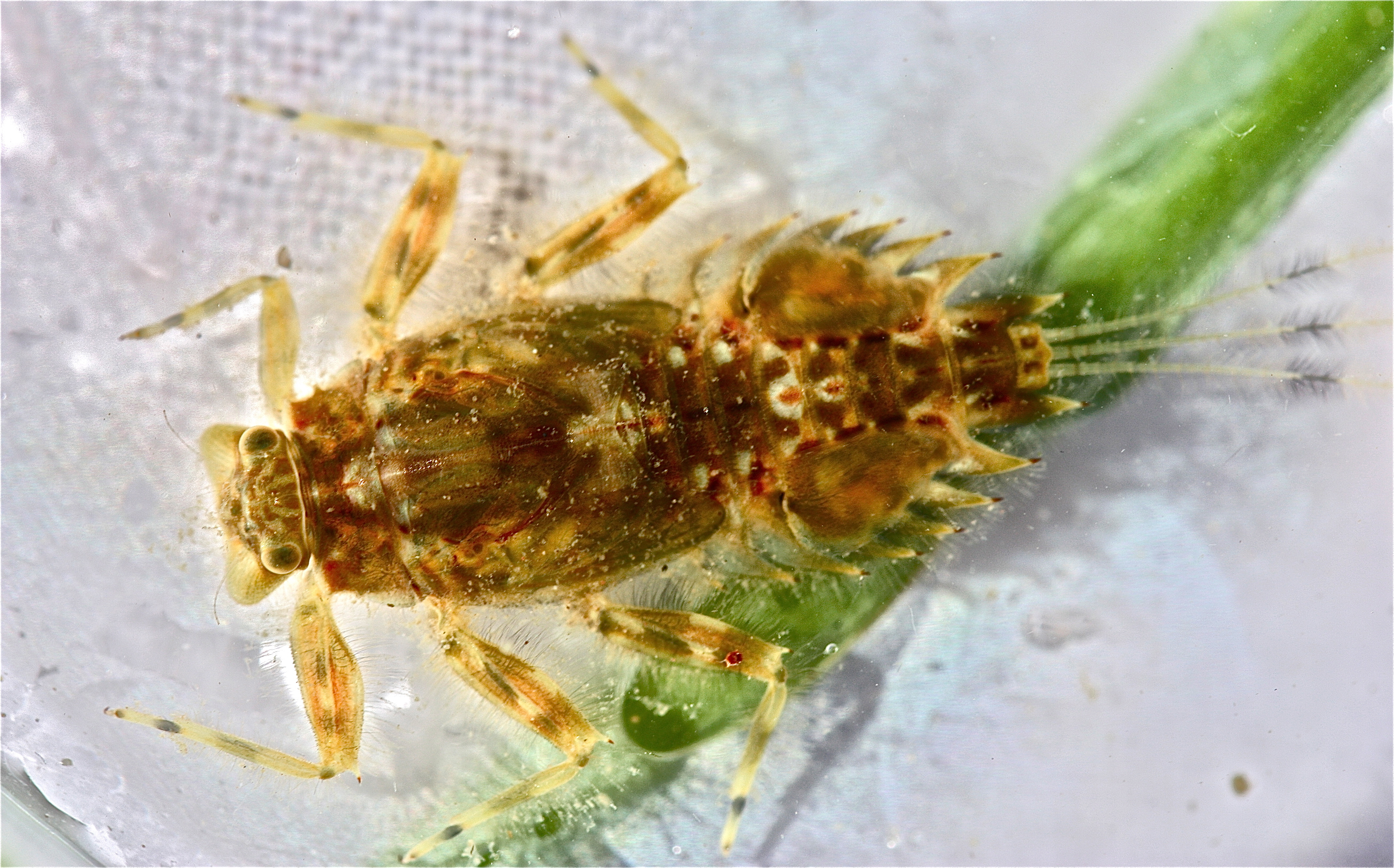
- Spiny crawler mayfly larva

Scientific classification
- Kingdom: Animalia
- Phylum: Arthropoda
- Class: Insecta
- Order: Ephemeroptera
- Family: Ephemerellidae
- Genus: Timpanoga; Needham, 1927
- Species: T. hecuba

Binomial name
- Timpanoga hecuba (Eaton, 1884)

Synonyms
- Ephemerella (Timpanoga) Needham, 1927

= Timpanoga =

Genus of mayflies

Timpanoga is a genus of spiny crawler mayflies in the family Ephemerellidae. There is one described species in Timpanoga, T. hecuba.
