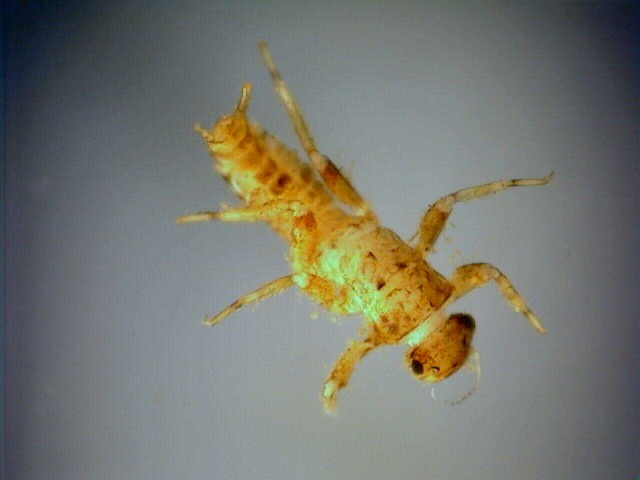
- Teloganopsis deficiens

Scientific classification
- Domain: Eukaryota
- Kingdom: Animalia
- Phylum: Arthropoda
- Class: Insecta
- Order: Ephemeroptera
- Family: Ephemerellidae
- Genus: Teloganopsis; Ulmer, 1939

= Teloganopsis =

Genus of mayflies

Teloganopsis is a genus of spiny crawler mayflies in the family Ephemerellidae. There are about 17 described species in Teloganopsis.

== Species ==
These 17 species belong to the genus Teloganopsis:

- Teloganopsis albai (Gonzales del Tanago & Garcia de Jalon, 1983)
- Teloganopsis bauernfeindi (Thomas, Marie & Dia, 2000)
- Teloganopsis brocha (Kang & Yang, 1995)
- Teloganopsis changbaishanensis (Su & You, 1988)
- Teloganopsis chinoi (Gose, 1980)
- Teloganopsis deficiens (Morgan, 1911) (little black quill)
- Teloganopsis gracilis (Tshernova, 1952)
- Teloganopsis hispanica (Eaton, 1887)
- Teloganopsis jinghongensis (Xu, You & Hsu, 1984)
- Teloganopsis maculocaudata (Ikonomov, 1961)
- Teloganopsis media Ulmer, 1939
- Teloganopsis mesoleuca (Brauer, 1857)
- Teloganopsis oriens (Jacobus & McCafferty, 2006)
- Teloganopsis puigae Ubero-Pascal & Sartori, 2009
- Teloganopsis punctisetae (Matsumura, 1931)
- Teloganopsis setosa Zhou, 2017
- Teloganopsis subsolana (Allen, 1973)
