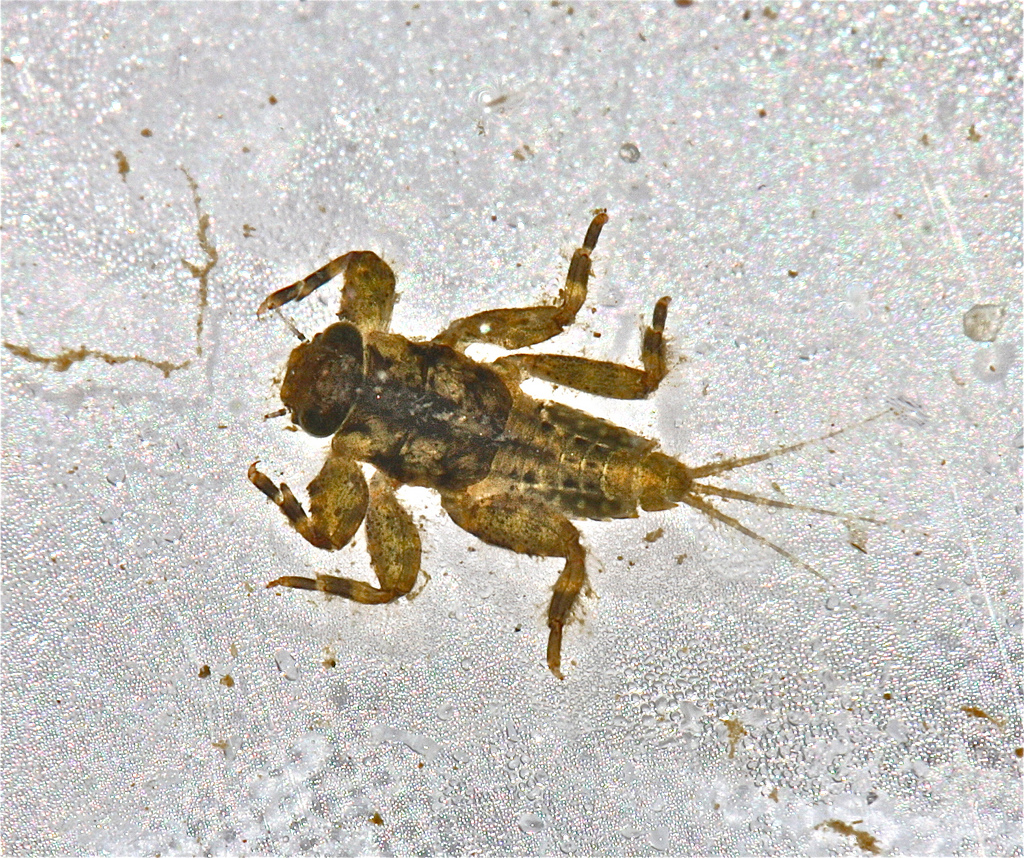

Scientific classification
- Domain: Eukaryota
- Kingdom: Animalia
- Phylum: Arthropoda
- Class: Insecta
- Order: Ephemeroptera
- Family: Ephemerellidae
- Genus: Drunella; Needham, 1905

= Drunella =

Genus of mayflies

Drunella is a genus of spiny crawler mayflies in the family Ephemerellidae. There are at least 20 described species in Drunella.

== Species ==
These 25 species belong to the genus Drunella.

- Drunella aculea (Allen, 1971)
- Drunella allegheniensis (Traver, 1934)
- Drunella basalis (Imanishi, 1937)
- Drunella coloradensis (Dodds, 1923)
- Drunella cornuta (Morgan, 1911)
- Drunella cornutella (McDunnough, 1931)
- Drunella cryptomeria (Imanishi, 1937)
- Drunella doddsi (Needham, 1927)
- Drunella doddsii (Needham, 1927)
- Drunella flavilinea (McDunnough, 1926)
- Drunella grandis (Eaton, 1884)
- Drunella ishiyamana (Matsumura, 1931)
- Drunella kohnoi (Allen, 1971)
- Drunella lata (Morgan, 1911)
- Drunella lepnevae (Tshernova, 1949)
- Drunella paradinasi (Tánago & Jalón, 1983)
- Drunella pelosa (Mayo, 1951)
- Drunella sachalinensis (Matsumura, 1931)
- Drunella solida (Bajkova, 1980)
- Drunella spinifera (Needham, 1927)
- Drunella submontana (Brodsky, 1930)
- Drunella triacantha (Tshernova, 1949)
- Drunella trispina (Uéno, 1928)
- Drunella tuberculata (Morgan, 1911)
- Drunella walkeri (Eaton, 1884)
