= Penelomax =

Scientific classification
- Domain: Eukaryota
- Kingdom: Animalia
- Phylum: Arthropoda
- Class: Insecta
- Order: Ephemeroptera
- Family: Ephemerellidae
- Genus: Penelomax; Jacobus & McCafferty, 2008
- Species: P. septentrionalis

Binomial name
- Penelomax septentrionalis (McDunnough, 1925)

Genus of mayflies

Penelomax is a genus of spiny crawler mayflies in the family Ephemerellidae. There is one described species in Penelomax, P. septentrionalis.
