= Attenella =

Scientific classification
- Domain: Eukaryota
- Kingdom: Animalia
- Phylum: Arthropoda
- Class: Insecta
- Order: Ephemeroptera
- Family: Ephemerellidae
- Genus: Attenella; Edmunds, 1971

Genus of mayflies

Attenella is a genus of spiny crawler mayflies in the family Ephemerellidae. There are at least four described species in Attenella.

== Species ==
These four species belong to the genus Attenella:

- Attenella attenuata (McDunnough, 1925)
- Attenella delantala (Mayo, 1952)
- Attenella margarita (Needham, 1927)
- Attenella soquele (Day, 1954)
