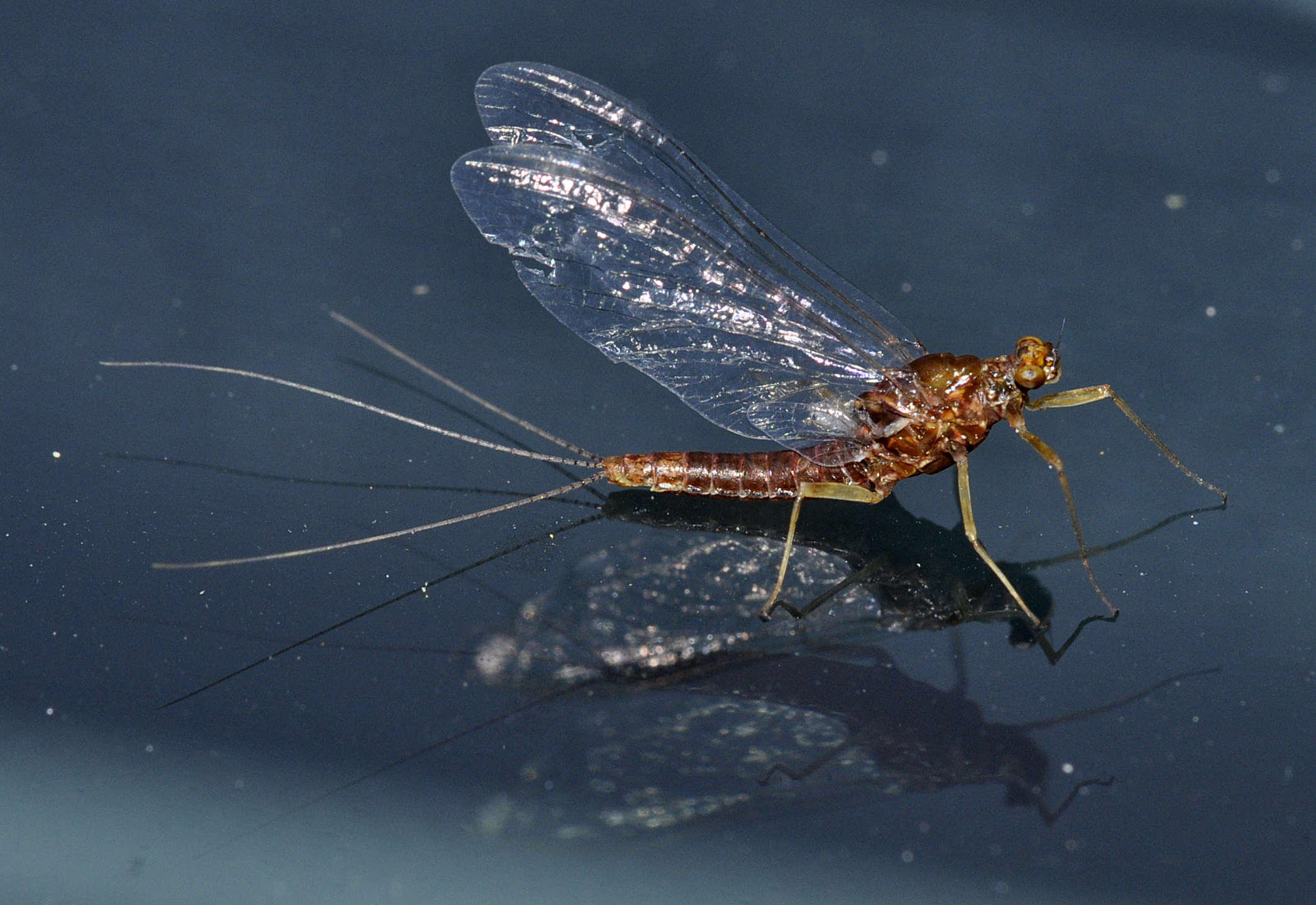

Scientific classification
- Domain: Eukaryota
- Kingdom: Animalia
- Phylum: Arthropoda
- Class: Insecta
- Order: Ephemeroptera
- Family: Ephemerellidae
- Genus: Serratella; Edmunds, 1959

Synonyms
- Ephemerella (Serratella) Edmunds, 1959

= Serratella =

Genus of mayflies

Serratella is a genus of spiny crawler mayflies in the family Ephemerellidae. There are at least 20 described species in Serratella.

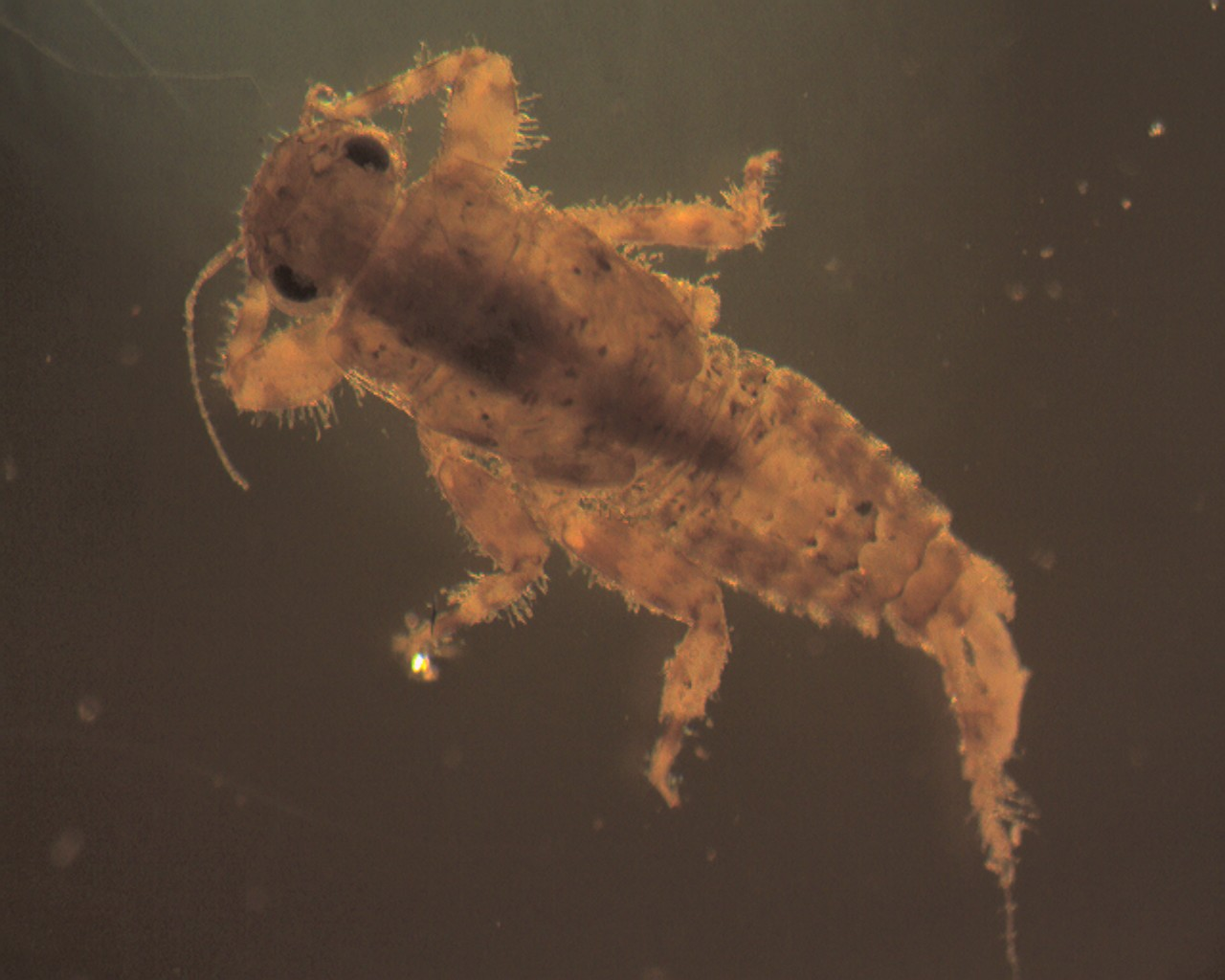

== Species ==
These 20 species belong to the genus Serratella:

- Serratella albai Gonzalez Del Tanago & Garcia De Jalon, 1983
- Serratella brevicauda Jacobus, Zhou & McCafferty, 2009
- Serratella elissa Jacobus, Zhou & McCafferty, 2009
- Serratella frisoni (McDunnough, 1927)
- Serratella fusongensis (Su & You, 1988)
- Serratella ignita (Poda, 1761)
- Serratella ishiwatai (Gose, 1985)
- Serratella karia (Kazanci, 1990)
- Serratella lactata (Bengtsson, 1909)
- Serratella levis (Day, 1954)
- Serratella longipennis Zhou, Gui & Su, 1997
- Serratella micheneri (Traver, 1934)
- Serratella occiprens Jacobus & McCafferty, 2008
- Serratella serrata (Morgan, 1911)
- Serratella serratoides (McDunnough, 1931)
- Serratella setigera (Bajkova, 1967)
- Serratella spinosa (Ikonomov, 1961)
- Serratella tsuno Jacobus & McCafferty, 2008
- Serratella uenoi (Allen & Edmunds, 1963)
- Serratella zapekinae (Bajkova, 1967)
