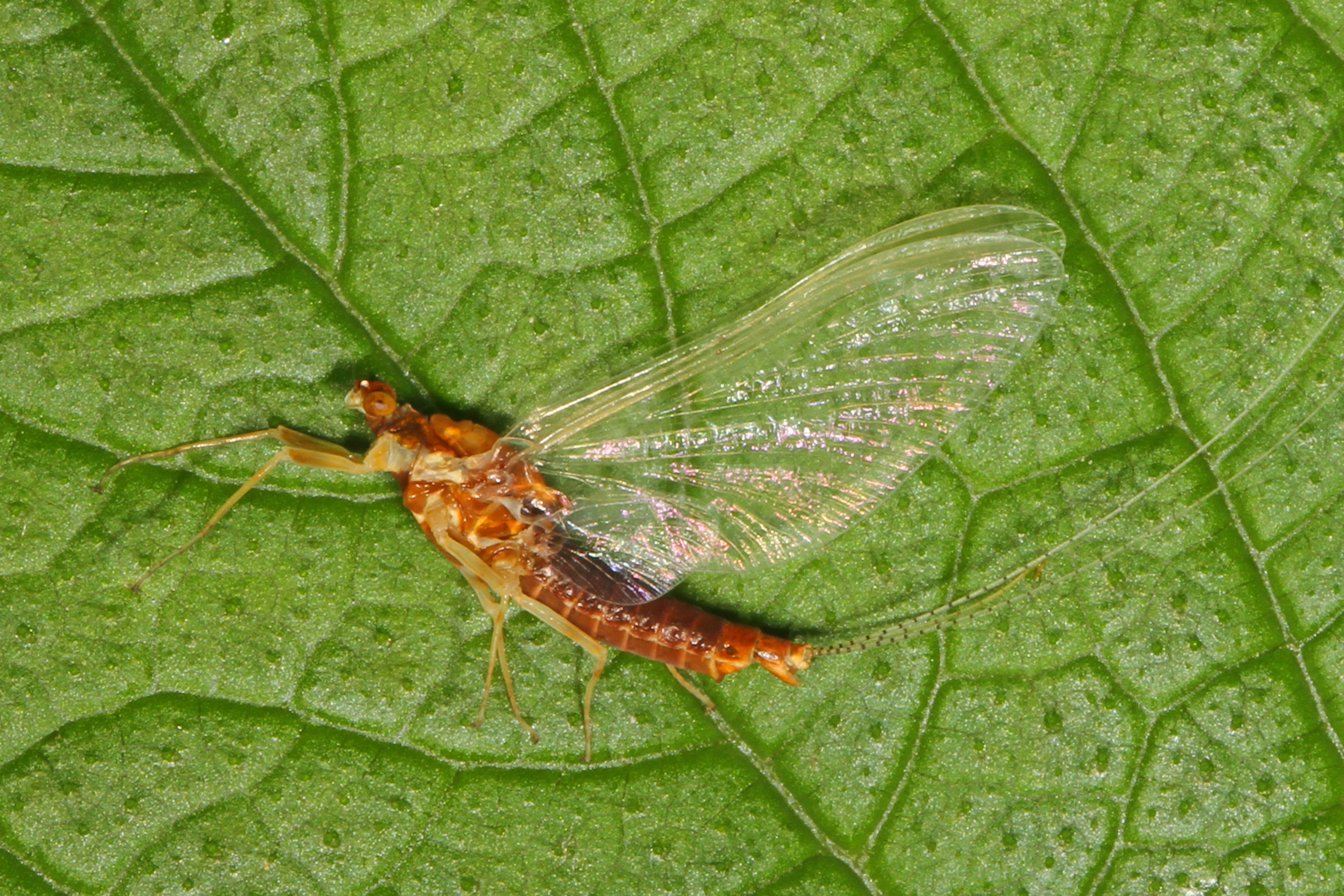

Scientific classification
- Domain: Eukaryota
- Kingdom: Animalia
- Phylum: Arthropoda
- Class: Insecta
- Order: Ephemeroptera
- Family: Ephemerellidae
- Genus: Eurylophella; Tiensuu, 1935

= Eurylophella =

Genus of mayflies

Eurylophella is a genus of spiny crawler mayflies in the family Ephemerellidae. There are about 18 described species in Eurylophella.

== Species ==
These 18 species belong to the genus Eurylophella:

- Eurylophella aestiva (McDunnough, 1931)
- Eurylophella bicolor (Clemens, 1913)
- Eurylophella bicoloroides (McDunnough, 1938)
- Eurylophella doris (Traver, 1934)
- Eurylophella enoensis Funk, 1994
- Eurylophella funeralis (McDunnough, 1925)
- Eurylophella iberica Keffermüller & Da-Terra, 1978
- Eurylophella karelica Tiensuu, 1935
- Eurylophella korneyevi
- Eurylophella lodi (Mayo, 1952)
- Eurylophella lutulenta (Clemens, 1913)
- Eurylophella macdunnoughi Funk, 1994
- Eurylophella minimella (McDunnough, 1931)
- Eurylophella oviruptis Funk in Funk, Jackson & Sweeney, 2008
- Eurylophella poconoensis Funk, 1994
- Eurylophella prudentalis (McDunnough, 1931)
- Eurylophella temporalis (McDunnough, 1924)
- Eurylophella verisimilis (McDunnough, 1930)
