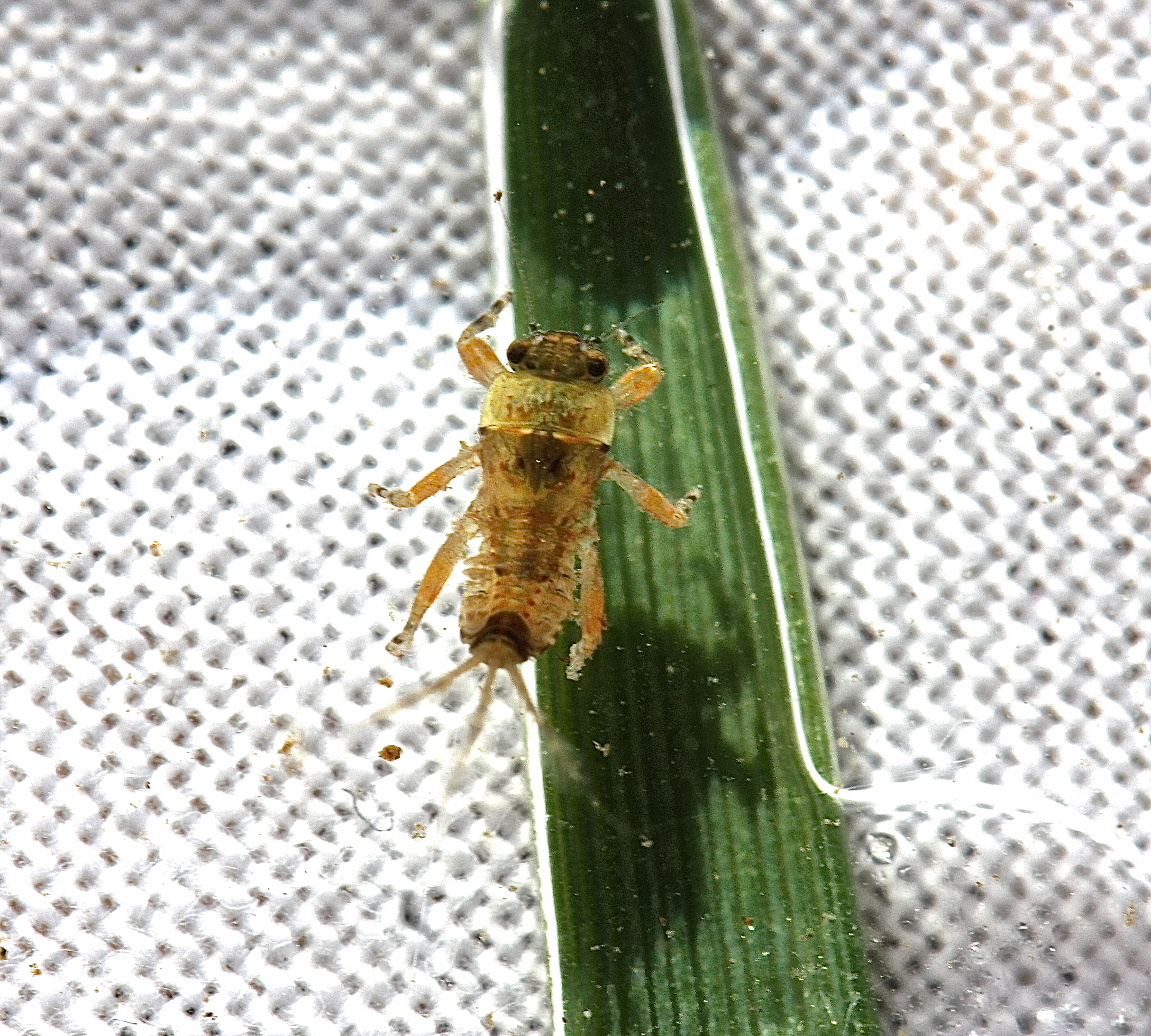
- Spiny crawler mayfly (Ephemerella subvaria)

Scientific classification
- Kingdom: Animalia
- Phylum: Arthropoda
- Class: Insecta
- Order: Ephemeroptera
- Family: Ephemerellidae
- Genus: Ephemerella; Walsh, 1862

Synonyms
- Chitonophora Bengtsson, 1908

= Ephemerella =

Genus of mayflies

Ephemerella is a genus of spiny crawler mayflies in the family Ephemerellidae with a widespread distribution.

== Species ==
The following are included in BioLib.cz:

1. Ephemerella alleni Jensen & Edmunds, 1966
2. Ephemerella altana Allen, 1968
3. Ephemerella apopsis McCafferty, 1992
4. Ephemerella argo Burks, 1947
5. Ephemerella aroni Eaton, 1908
6. Ephemerella atagosana Imanishi, 1937
7. Ephemerella aurivillii Bengtsson, 1909
8. Ephemerella berneri Allen & Edmunds, 1958
9. Ephemerella catawba Traver, 1932
10. Ephemerella chinoi Gose, 1980
11. Ephemerella choctawhatchee Berner, 1946
12. Ephemerella consimilis Walsh, 1862
13. Ephemerella cornutus Gose, 1980
14. Ephemerella corpulenta Braasch, 1981
15. Ephemerella crenula Allen & Edmunds, 1965
16. Ephemerella cryptomeria Imanishi, 1937
17. Ephemerella dorothea Needham, 1908
18. Ephemerella euphratica (Kazanci, 1987)
19. Ephemerella excrucians Walsh, 1862 (pale morning dun)
20. Ephemerella floripara McCafferty, 1985
21. Ephemerella fratercula McDunnough, 1925
22. Ephemerella fusongensis Su & You, 1988
23. Ephemerella gracilis (Tshernova, 1952)
24. Ephemerella grandiforceps (Su & Zhou, 2002)
25. Ephemerella hispida Allen & Edmunds, 1965
26. Ephemerella imanishii Gose, 1980
27. Ephemerella inconstans Traver, 1932
28. Ephemerella indica Kapur & Kripalani, 1961
29. Ephemerella inermis Eaton, 1884
30. Ephemerella infrequens McDunnough, 1924
31. Ephemerella invaria Walker, 1853 (sulphur dun)
32. Ephemerella ishiwatai Gose, 1985
33. Ephemerella ishiyamana (Matsumura, 1932)
34. Ephemerella karia (Kazanci, 1990)
35. Ephemerella kozhovi Bajkova, 1967
36. Ephemerella lacustris Allen & Edmunds, 1965
37. Ephemerella maculata Traver, 1934
38. Ephemerella mesoleucus (Brauer, 1857)
39. Ephemerella moffatae Allen, 1977
40. Ephemerella molita McDunnough, 1930
41. Ephemerella mucronata (Bengtsson, 1909)
42. Ephemerella needhami McDunnough, 1925
43. Ephemerella nigromaculata Xu, You, Su & Hsu, 1980
44. Ephemerella notata Eaton, 1887
45. Ephemerella nuda Tshernova, 1949
46. Ephemerella ora Burks, 1949
47. Ephemerella rama Allen, 1968
48. Ephemerella rossi Allen & Edmunds, 1965
49. Ephemerella rotunda Morgan, 1911
50. Ephemerella septentrionalis McDunnough, 1925
51. Ephemerella serrata (Braasch, 1981)
52. Ephemerella shanwangensis Hong, 1983
53. Ephemerella simila Allen & Edmunds, 1965
54. Ephemerella soldáni (Allen, 1986)
55. Ephemerella spinosa Morgan, 1911
56. Ephemerella subsolana Allen, 1973
57. Ephemerella subvaria McDunnough, 1931 (red quill)
58. Ephemerella swatensis Ali, 1971
59. Ephemerella tianmushanensis Xu, You, Su & Hsu, 1980
60. Ephemerella tibialis McDunnough, 1924
61. Ephemerella trigonoptera Staniczek, Godunko & Kluge, 2017
62. Ephemerella unicornis Needham, 1905
63. Ephemerella velmae Allen & Edmunds, 1963
64. Ephemerella verruca Allen & Edmunds, 1965
65. Ephemerella xiaosimaensis You, 1987
