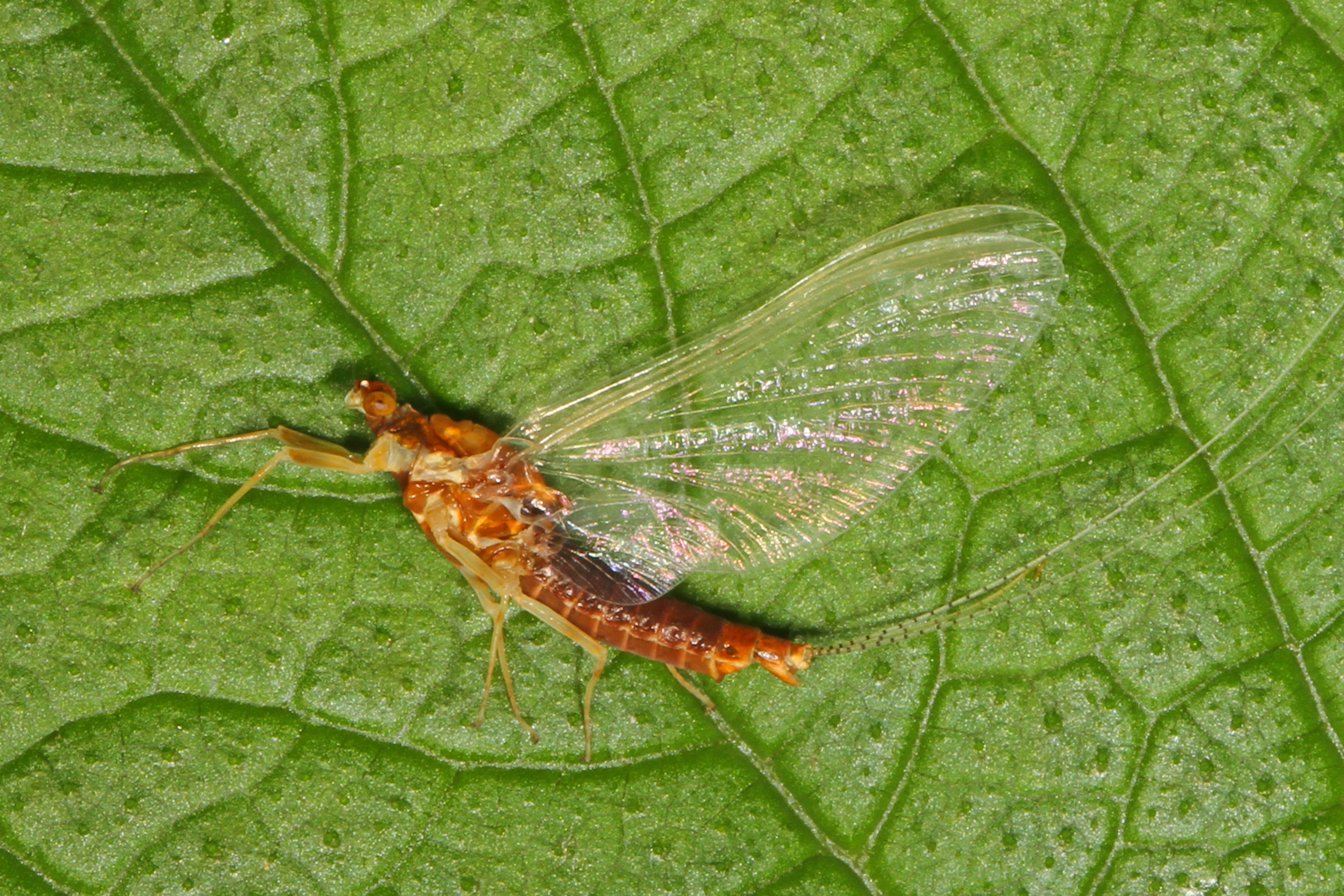
- Eurylophella sp.

Scientific classification
- Domain: Eukaryota
- Kingdom: Animalia
- Phylum: Arthropoda
- Class: Insecta
- Order: Ephemeroptera
- Suborder: Pannota
- Superfamily: Ephemerelloidea
- Family: Ephemerellidae; Klapálek, 1909

Genera
- See text

= Ephemerellidae =

Family of mayflies

Ephemerellidae are known as the spiny crawler mayflies. They are a family of the order Ephemeroptera. There are eight genera consisting of a total 90 species (Merritt & Cummins). They are distributed throughout North America as well as the UK. Their habitat is lotic-erosional, they are found in all sizes of flowing streams on different types of substrates where there is reduced flow. They are even found on the shores of lakes and beaches where there is wave action present. They move by swimming and clinging, they are very well camouflaged. Most species have one generation per year. They are mostly collector-gatherers.

If threatened by a predator, the larva will raise its three tails in a "scorpion posture" to appear larger. It will then project its tails in front and poke the enemy. Most species are sensitive to disturbance.

In the UK, the most commonly recorded species is Seratella ignita. The nymph of this animal is often distinguished from other Mayflies by the darker bands prominent on the legs and tails. Although another rare species Ephemerella notata lacks these prominent bands and so is more difficult to identify.

== Morphology ==
The adults have the characteristic 3 tails. Additionally, the adults are generally 5– 15 mm. They have reduced mouthparts because the adults just emerge to mate and then die shortly after. They have two front wings and two reduced hind wings. Their wings are membranous and heavily veined to add strength since the adults must find one another through flight. The eyes of adult Ephemerellids are large and sit above two setaceous antennae. Their lightly sclerotized abdomen contains many segments for ease of mating positioning. The main feeding stage for these insects is the larval stage. The larvae have operculate gills—which just means that they are hardened. These gills allow them to breathe under water which makes them semi aquatic. The larvae and adults are soft bodied so they must be contained. They filter out debris and extract nutrients from that.

== Significance to man ==
Mayflies are commonly used as models for fly fishing lures. Both the nymphs and the adults are common food among the aquatic stream world. With their long tails, they are very attractive bait for many species of trout, and in some cases small mouth bass. They have created a large market for fly fishing and have had a positive impact on the economy by selling the materials to make flies as well as the whole flies themselves. Additionally, mayflies- along with Trichoptera and Plecoptera- are frequently used as biological indicators. Many species are intolerant of pollution and will not survive in anthropogenically disturbed (pollution, urbanization, agriculture) streams. Their habitat, especially at the nymphal stage, is very limited. They are weak swimmers so they normally root to rocks, algae, and other vegetation. This poses a problem: if the area they are in becomes polluted there will be a die off. This obviously interrupts the natural ecosystem and food chain within that stream which can create an imbalance and affect populations of larger predators such as fish and eventually birds who eat the fish. They are fundamental to the proper functioning of the ecosystem within the streams.

== Genera ==
- Attenella Edmunds, 1971
- Caudatella Edmunds, 1959
- Caurinella Allen, 1984
- Dannella Edmunds, 1959
- Dentatella Allen, 1980
- Drunella Needham, 1905
- Ephemerella Walsh, 1862
- Eurylophella Tiensuu, 1935
- Matriella Jacobus and McCafferty, 2008
- Penelomax Jacobus & McCafferty, 2008
- Serratella Edmunds, 1959
- Teloganopsis Ulmer, 1939
- Timpanoga Needham, 1927
- Tsalia Jacobus and McCafferty, 2008
