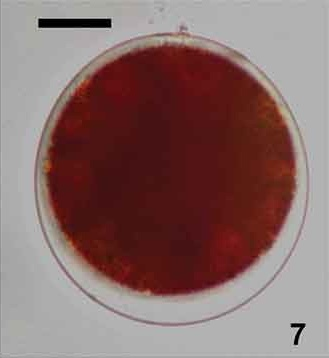
- Chlainomonas sp.

Scientific classification
- Kingdom: Plantae
- Division: Chlorophyta
- Class: Chlorophyceae
- Order: Chlamydomonadales
- Family: Chlamydomonadaceae
- Genus: Chlainomonas; Christen

Type species
- Chlainomonas ovalis H.R.Christen

Species
- Chlainomonas kolii; Chlainomonas ovalis; Chlainomonas rubra

= Chlainomonas =

Genus of algae

Chlainomonas is a genus of algae in the family Chlamydomonadaceae. They are found in freshwater habitats or on snow, where they are one of the main algae responsible for causing watermelon snow.

== Description ==
Chlainomonas consists of single, ovate cells with four apical flagella attached at the tip. The protoplast is separated from the cell wall by a thick, hyaline layer; it is often filled with red pigments. There is a single chloroplast filling the cell. Pyrenoids are absent, or may be otherwise difficult to observe within the cytoplasm. There are typically two contractile vacuoles at the apex of the cell. Some species have a stigma.

=== Life cycle ===
Chlainomonas reproduces asexually; no sexual reproduction has been observed in this genus. The mode of asexual reproduction in Chlainomonas is highly unusual. During Chlainomonas, new cells are produced when the protoplasm is squeezed through the cell envelope in a thin stream. This leads to the protoplast being divided into two halves, one of which is outside of the parent cell. After this, the protoplast quickly becomes surrounded by a gelatinous layer, similar to the parent cell.

When in snow, Chlainomonas is typically found as a resting spore (also known as a cyst), and may be in one of two different morphologies. In the first form, the spore is ellipsoidal and is covered with spines. In the second form, the resting spore forms a thick wall but no spines. Both are surrounded by an external envelope, with four grooves where the flagella would extend.

== Habitat ==
Two species of Chlainomonas are commonly found in snow (Chlainomonas kolii and C. rubra. They have been reported from mountains in the Pacific Northwest and in New Zealand. The third species, Chlainomonas ovalis, is a freshwater species.

== Phylogeny ==
The genus Chlainomonas is monophyletic. However, it is embedded within a clade containing most of the species Chloromonas, rendering the latter genus paraphyletic. It is most closely related to other snow-inhabiting species in the genus Chloromonas, but is not closely related to Chlamydomonas nivalis, a morphologically similar red snow alga.
