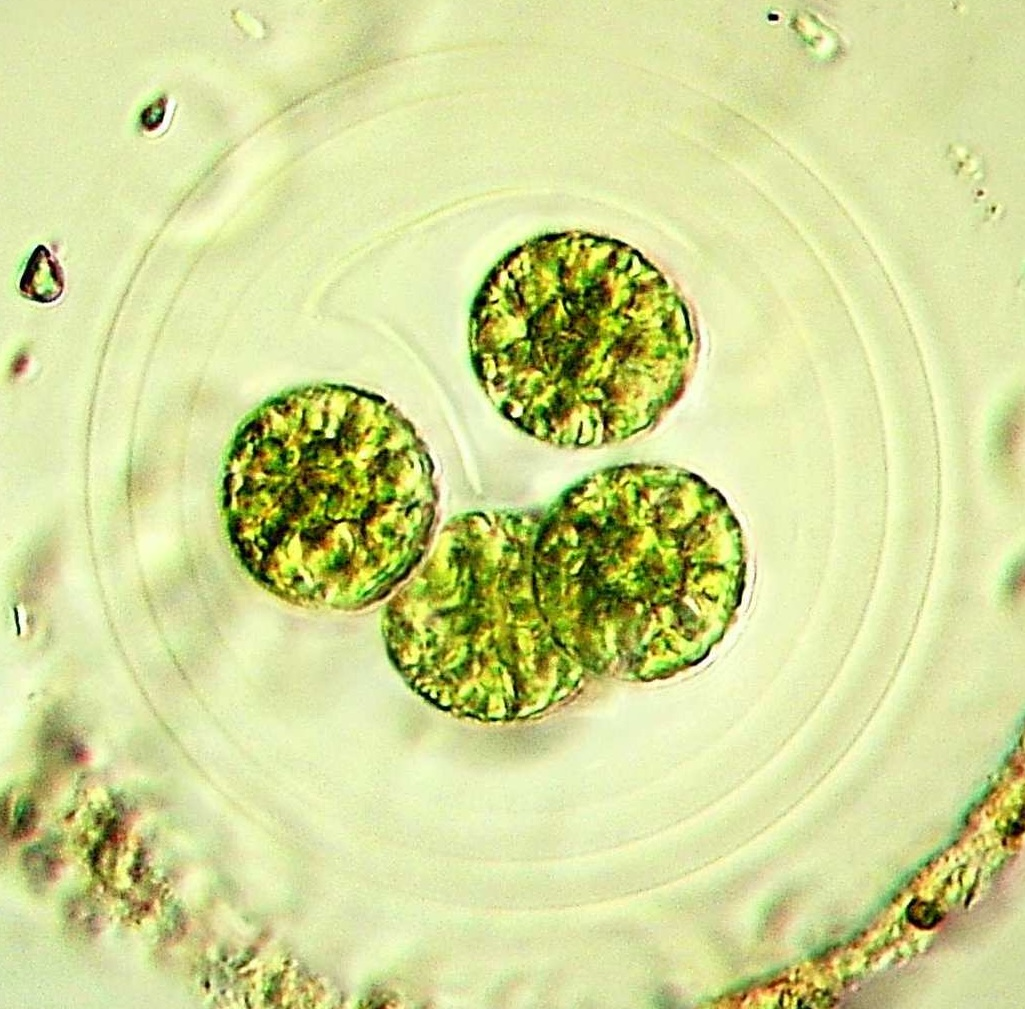
- Asterococcus superbus

Scientific classification
- Clade: Viridiplantae
- Division: Chlorophyta
- Class: Chlorophyceae
- Order: Chlamydomonadales
- Family: Palmellopsidaceae
- Genus: Asterococcus; Scherffel

Type species
- Asterococcus superbus (Cienkowski) Scherffel

Species
- See text

= Asterococcus =

Genus of algae

Asterococcus is a genus of green algae in the order Chlamydomonadales. It is planktonic in freshwater ponds and lakes, or benthic within mires and swamps. It is a common and widespread genus, but is rarely abundant.

== Taxonomy ==
The botanist Leon Cienkowski was the first to observed organisms now assigned to Asterococcus, when he described the taxon Pleurococcus superbus in 1865. Later in 1908, Aladár Scherffel transferred that species into a new genus, and named it Asterococcus.

Asterococcus is monophyletic. Currently, taxonomic databases such as AlgaeBase place this genus in the family Palmellopsidaceae. However, molecular phylogenetics have demonstrated that it is most closely related to some species of Carteria, such as Carteria radiosa.

== Description ==
Asterococcus consists of colonies in powers of two (two, four, eight, 16, rarely up to 64), or occasionally single cells, embedded within a conspicuous, often layered mucilaginous envelope. The cells are usually spherical to ellipsoidal and are either dispersed in the envelope or attached to the end of a branched (dendroid), mucilaginous stalk. Cells are 10–40 μm in diameter with smooth cell walls, a single nucleus and usually with two contractile vacuoles. Cells contain a single chloroplast in the center of the cell with a central pyrenoid, with numerous radiating lobes flattened against the cell wall.

Reproduction in Asterococcus occurs asexually by the formation of aplanospores or zoospores, of which two to eight are produced per cell. Once formed, they are released through the dissolution of the parent cell wall. Sexual reproduction has never been observed in this genus.

== Species ==
There are currently five recognized species within the genus:

- Asterococcus korschikoffii Ettl
- Asterococcus limneticus G.M.Smith
- Asterococcus papillatus Nakazawa
- Asterococcus spinosus Prescott
- Asterococcus superbus (Cienkowski) Scherffel

Species identification in Asterococcus depends on morphological criteria such as the form of the colony (dendroid or not), characteristics of the cell wall, and whether the colonial envelope is lamellated or not.
