= Palmellopsis =

Scientific classification
- Kingdom: Plantae
- Division: Chlorophyta
- Class: Chlorophyceae
- Order: Chlamydomonadales
- Family: Palmellopsidaceae
- Genus: Palmellopsis; Korshikov

Type species
- Palmellopsis gelatinosa Korshikov

Species
- P. sp. BCP-EM1VF1

Genus of algae

Palmellopsis is a genus of green algae, specifically of the Palmellopsidaceae. They are either planktonic or attached to substrates in fresh water, or in aeroterrestrial habitats.

Palmellopsis consists of cells embedded in amorphous, gelatinous mucilage. The cells contain a cup-shaped chloroplast with a pyrenoid, as well as a single nucleus and two contractile vacuoles.

Asexual reproduction in this genus occurs by autospores or zoospores or by the fragmentation of the colonies. Zoospores have two equal flagella with a small stigma.

Palmellopsis is distinguished from the similar genera Palmella and Chlamydocapsa in that its mucilage layer is not lamellated. The differentiation between these genera is taxonomically problematic.
