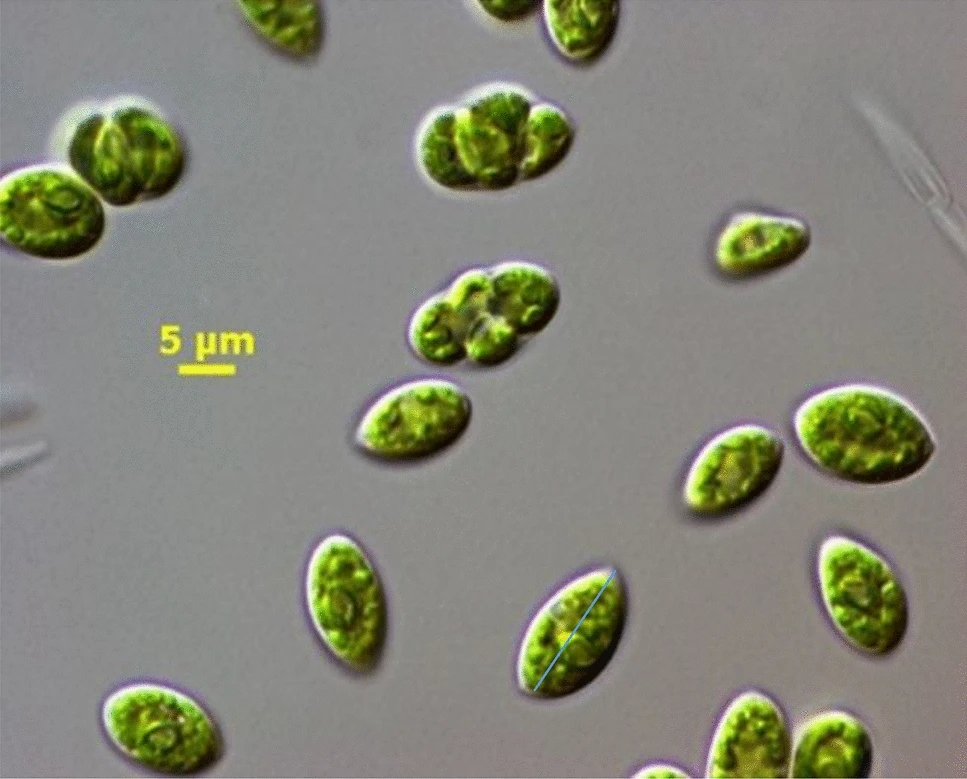
- Chlamydopodium fusiforme

Scientific classification
- Kingdom: Plantae
- Division: Chlorophyta
- Class: Chlorophyceae
- Order: Chlamydomonadales
- Family: Characiochloridaceae
- Genus: Chlamydopodium; Ettl & Komárek

Type species
- Chlamydopodium pluricoccum (Korshikov) Ettl & Komárek

Species
- Chlamydopodium fusiforme; Chlamydopodium pluricoccum; Chlamydopodium vacuolatum

= Chlamydopodium =

Genus of algae

Chlamydopodium is a genus of green algae in the family Characiochloridaceae. It has been recorded from soil or attached to algae or zooplankton.

== Description ==
Chlamydopodium consists of solitary or clustered cells attached to a substrate via a pad of mucilage. Cells are usually ellipsoidal to ovoid, with a smooth, thickened cell wall, and a single central nucleus. Cells contain a single parietal chloroplast which is band-shaped and may be variously lobed; there are one to five pyrenoids covered in a starch sheath.

Chlamydopodium reproduces asexually via biflagellate zoospores, which contain a band-shaped chloroplast, a stigma, and two contractile vacuoles. Sexual reproduction has been observed in one species.

Species are distinguished from each other by their shapes and sizes, and their chloroplast morphologies. It is similar to the genus Characiochloris, and differs by lacking contractile vacuoles in its vegetative cells.
