= Cecidochloris =

Scientific classification
- Clade: Viridiplantae
- Division: Chlorophyta
- Class: Chlorophyceae
- Order: Chlamydomonadales
- Family: Chlorangiellaceae
- Genus: Cecidochloris; Skuja

Type species
- Cecidochloris adnata (Korshikov) H.Ettl

Species
- Cecidochloris adnata (Korshikov) H.Ettl

Genus of algae

Cecidochloris is a green algae genus in the family Chlorangiellaceae. It occurs in freshwater. However, it has only been reported so far from Europe, with an additional species from India that is incompletely described.

Cecidochloris consists of unicellular or colonial organisms, which are endophytic within the mucilage envelopes of various microalgae, such as green algae, golden algae, and cyanobacteria (blue-green algae). They are up to 20–30 μm in diameter, with two, four, eight or 16 cells per colony. Cells are ovate, 6–12 μm long, with a smooth cell wall. Cells contain a single nucleus, one parietal chloroplast containing a single pyrenoid, a stigma, and two apical contractile vacuoles.

Cecidochloris reproduces asexually when the cell divides into two, four, eight or 16 new cells, or with the formation of two or four zoospores. Zoospores have two apical flagella until they attach themselves to a new substrate, at which point they lose their flagella. Sexual reproduction has not been observed in this genus.

Cecidochloris is morphologically similar to the genus Chlorophysema. Cecidochloris is principally distinguished from the latter in that it lacks an organ, such as a stalk or basal pad, which is used to attach to the substrate.
