= Pyrobotrys elegans =

Scientific classification
- Clade: Viridiplantae
- Division: Chlorophyta
- Class: Chlorophyceae
- Order: Chlamydomonadales
- Family: Spondylomoraceae
- Genus: Pyrobotrys
- Species: P. elegans

Binomial name
- Pyrobotrys elegans (J.Behlau) H.Nozaki

Synonyms
- Chlamydobotrys elegans J. Behlau

Species of alga

Pyrobotrys elegans is a species of green algae in the family Spondylomoraceae.
