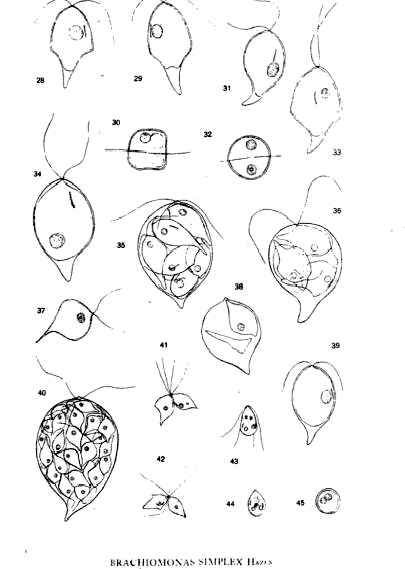
- Plate 4; Brachiomonas simplex Hazen Drawn 29 June—4 July 1920, Aalesund, Norway.

Scientific classification
- Clade: Viridiplantae
- Division: Chlorophyta
- Class: Chlorophyceae
- Order: Chlamydomonadales
- Family: Chlamydomonadaceae
- Genus: Brachiomonas; Bohlin, 1897

Type species
- Brachiomonas submarina Bohlin

Species
- See text

= Brachiomonas =

Genus of algae

Brachiomonas is a genus of thalloid biflagellate green algae. These algae generally are found in marine or brackish waters, but can tolerate wide range of salinities. They may occur in freshwater pools near the sea and, occasionally, in polluted inland freshwater habitats.

== Description ==
Brachiomonas is a single-celled, free-swimming organism. The cells have four or five large, cone-shaped projections on the equatorial region that are pointed towards the back of the cell, as well as one large cone-shaped projection on the end of the cell. In some cases, the horns may be reduced to small bumps. The cell has two flagella which are about as long or longer than the cell body itself. There is a single chloroplast which fills most of the cell, with a single pyrenoid. Cells sometimes have an eyespot, but lack contractile vacuoles. One nucleus is present in the center of the cell.

Asexual reproduction occurs by the successive division of the protoplast into four or eight pieces, which then form into the shape of the mother cell before being released from the mother cell wall. Aplanospores have also been reported. Sexual reproduction is isogamous. The gametes have two flagella, and upon fusing, form a 4-flagellate zygote.

== Species ==
The species currently recognised are:

- B. bipyramidalis
- B. crux
- B. eugeniana
- B. simplex
- B. submarina

Species are distinguished from each other by the morphology of the "horns" of the cell, as well as the number of pyrenoids.
