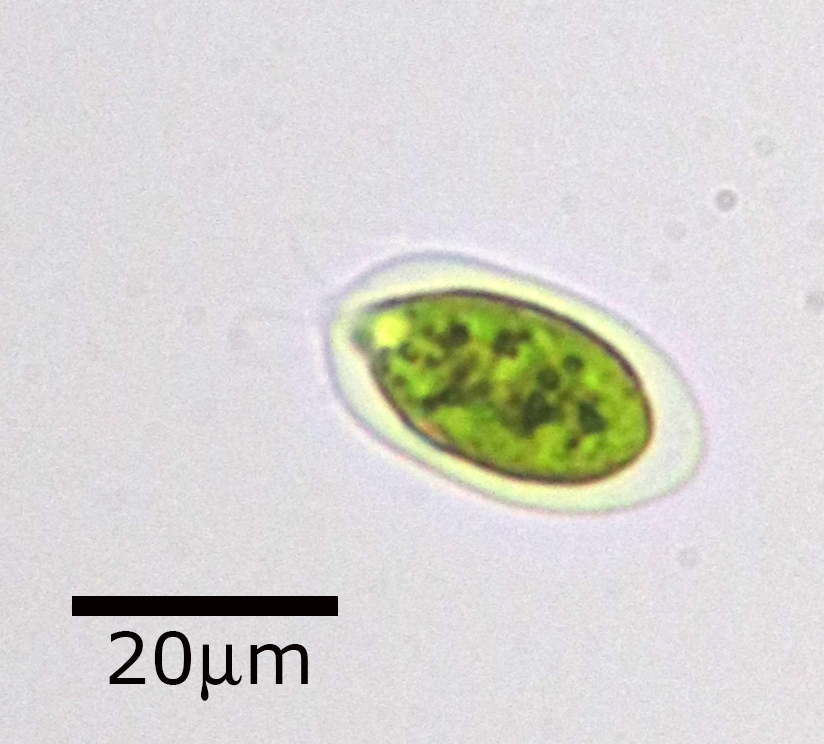

Scientific classification
- Kingdom: Plantae
- Division: Chlorophyta
- Class: Chlorophyceae
- Order: Chlamydomonadales
- Family: Chlamydomonadaceae
- Genus: Vitreochlamys; Batko

Type species
- Vitreochlamys fluviatilis (F.Stein) Batko

Species
- Vitreochlamys aulata; Vitreochlamys fluviatilis; Vitreochlamys gloeocystiformis; Vitreochlamys nekrassovii; Vitreochlamys ordinata; Vitreochlamys pinguis

Synonyms
- Sphaerellopsis Korshikov

= Vitreochlamys =

Genus of algae

Vitreochlamys is a genus of green algae in the family Chlamydomonadaceae. It is sometimes known by the name Sphaerellopsis, published by Aleksandr Arkadievich Korshikov. However, that name is an illegitimate later homonym, preceded by Sphaerellopsis M.C.Cooke. It is commonly found in freshwater habitats.

Vitreochlamys is a unicellular, free-living organism. Cells are spherical, ovoidal, or ellipsoidal, with two equal flagella at one end, and two or three contractile vacuoles at the base of the flagella. The cell wall is swollen, giving the appearance of a layer surrounding the protoplast. Cells contain a single large chloroplast filling the cell, with pyrenoids and a stigma. Asexual reproduction occurs by the formation of zoospores within the parent cell wall; sexual reproduction has not been observed. Species are distinguished from each other by their cell shape, number of contractile vacuoles and pyrenoids, location of the cell nucleus, and degree of longitudinal striation of the chloroplasts.

The swollen cell wall is gelatinous, and similar in composition to the gelatinous matrices of other colonial algae, such as the Volvocaceae.

As currently circumscribed, the genus Vitreochlamys is known to be polyphyletic.
