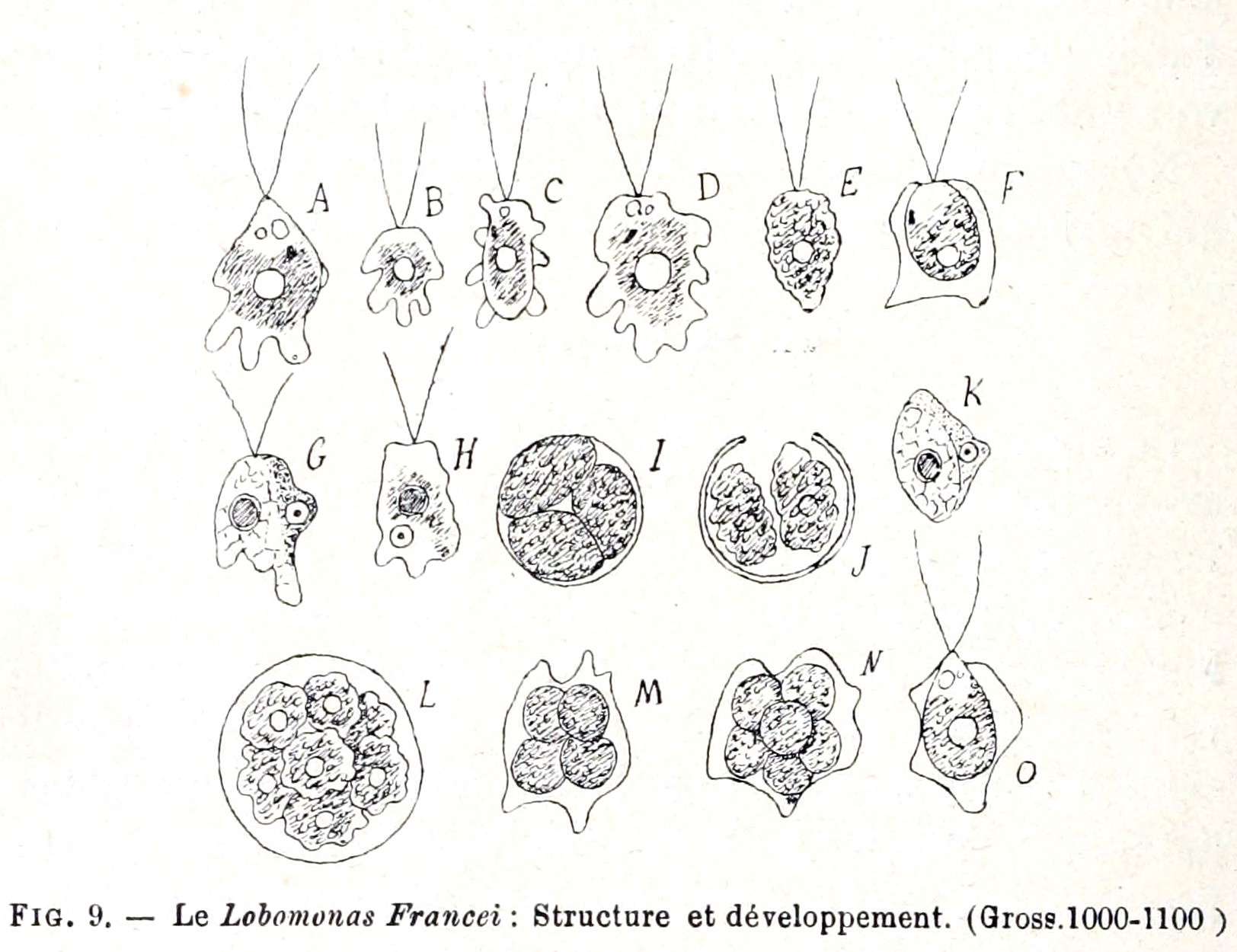
- Lobomonas francei

Scientific classification
- Kingdom: Plantae
- Division: Chlorophyta
- Class: Chlorophyceae
- Order: Chlamydomonadales
- Family: Chlamydomonadaceae
- Genus: Lobomonas; P.-A.Dangeard

Type species
- Lobomonas francei P.-A.Dangeard

Species
- Lobomonas monstruosa; Lobomonas rostrata

= Lobomonas =

Genus of algae

Lobomonas is a genus of green algae in the family Chlamydomonadaceae, found in freshwater habitats. Although it is widely distributed, it is a rare genus.

Lobomonas is a unicellular organism with two flagella, which are attached at the anterior apex of the cell. Cells are ellipsoid, ovoid, or globose in outline and have a round or polygonal cross section. Cells are covered in a thick cell wall with various bumps, lobes, or other projections. A single large chloroplast fills the protoplasm, sometimes containing one pyrenoid. There is a conspicuous stigma in the anterior region of the cell. Two or four contractile vacuoles are present, usually right below the flagella, but sometimes irregularly dispersed throughout the protoplasm.

Asexual reproduction occurs by the formation of zoospores within the parent cell. Sexual reproduction has not been observed.
