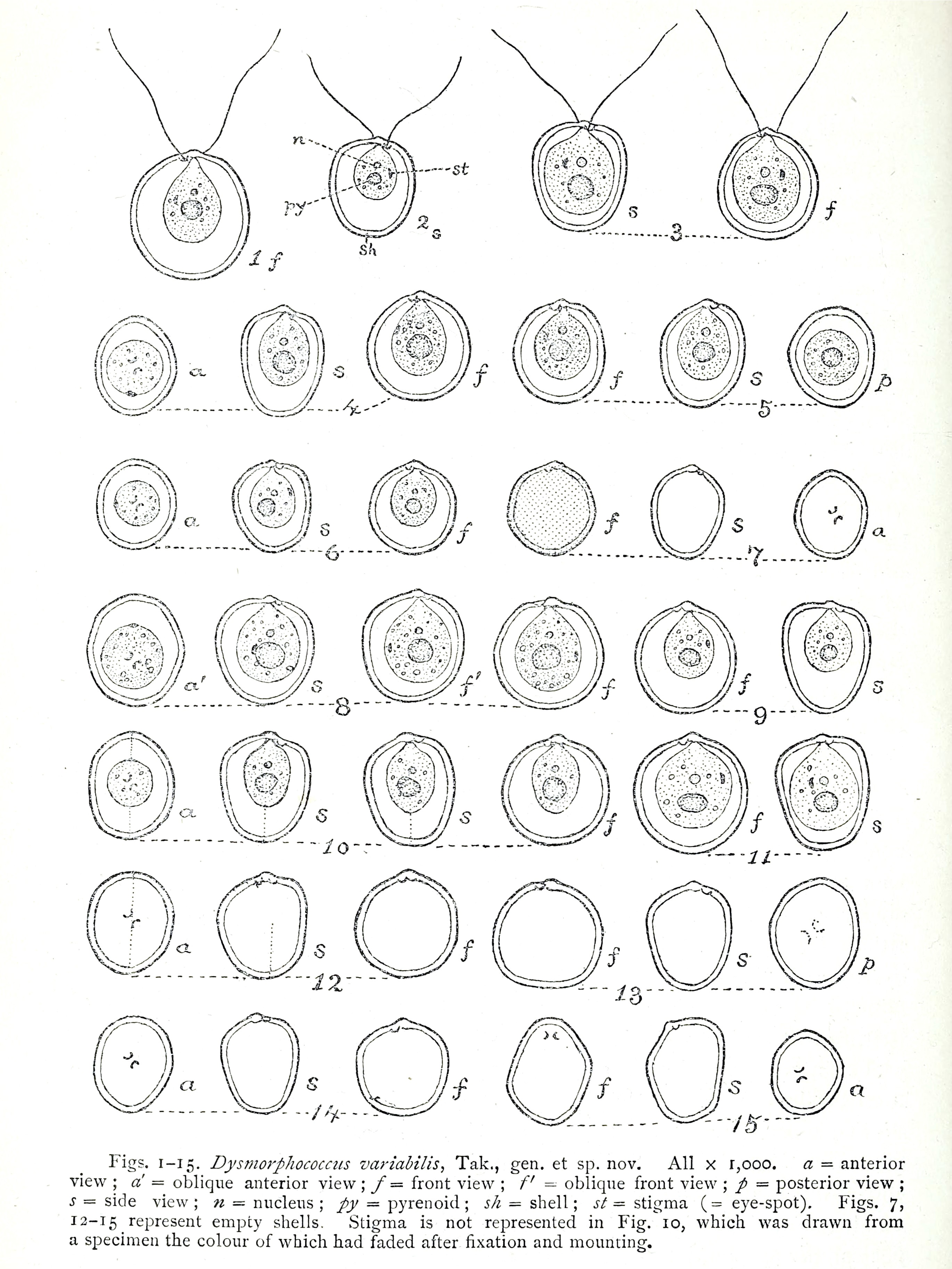
- Dymorphococcus variabilis

Scientific classification
- Kingdom: Plantae
- Division: Chlorophyta
- Class: Chlorophyceae
- Order: Chlamydomonadales
- Family: Phacotaceae
- Genus: Dysmorphococcus; Takeda

Type species
- Dysmorphococcus variabilis Takeda

Species
- Dysmorphococcus coccifer; Dysmorphococcus fritschii; Dysmorphococcus globosus; Dysmorphococcus variabilis

= Dysmorphococcus =

Genus of algae

Dysmorphococcus is a genus of green algae in the order Chlamydomonadales. It is a freshwater genus and has a cosmopolitan distribution, but is usually not very frequent.

== Description ==
Dysmorphococcus consists of unicellular, motile cells with two flagella; the protoplast of the shell is contained within a firm shell, called a lorica; the protoplast does not completely fill the lorica, so there is a gap between the protoplast and the lorica. The lorica may be colored brown due to deposits of iron compounds, and is covered with fine pores or sometimes granules. The two flagella emerge from two separate pores. The protoplast itself is globose to pyriform, with two apical contractile vacuoles or several contractile vacuoles irregularly distributed throughout the cytoplasm. Cells contain a single cup-shaped chloroplast with a stigma and one or more pyrenoids.

Asexual reproduction occurs through the formation of zoospores; during reproduction the protoplast divides into two or four daughter cells and the lorica fragments, releasing the daughter cells. Aplanospores have been reported. Sexual reproduction has been reported once, being isogamous to anisogamous.

=== Identification ===
Dysmorphococcus is very similar to the Coccomonas, but in Coccomonas both flagella emerge through a single pore in the lorica. It is also superficially similar to Trachelomonas, which has a single thick flagellum.

Species-level identification in Dysmorphococcus depends on morphological features such as the number of pyrenoids, contractile vacuoles, and shape and ornamentation of the lorica.

== Phylogeny ==
Although Dysmorphococcus is traditionally placed in the family Phacotaceae based on morphology, it is unrelated to Phacotaceae sensu stricto and instead is within the clade Caudivolvoxa.
