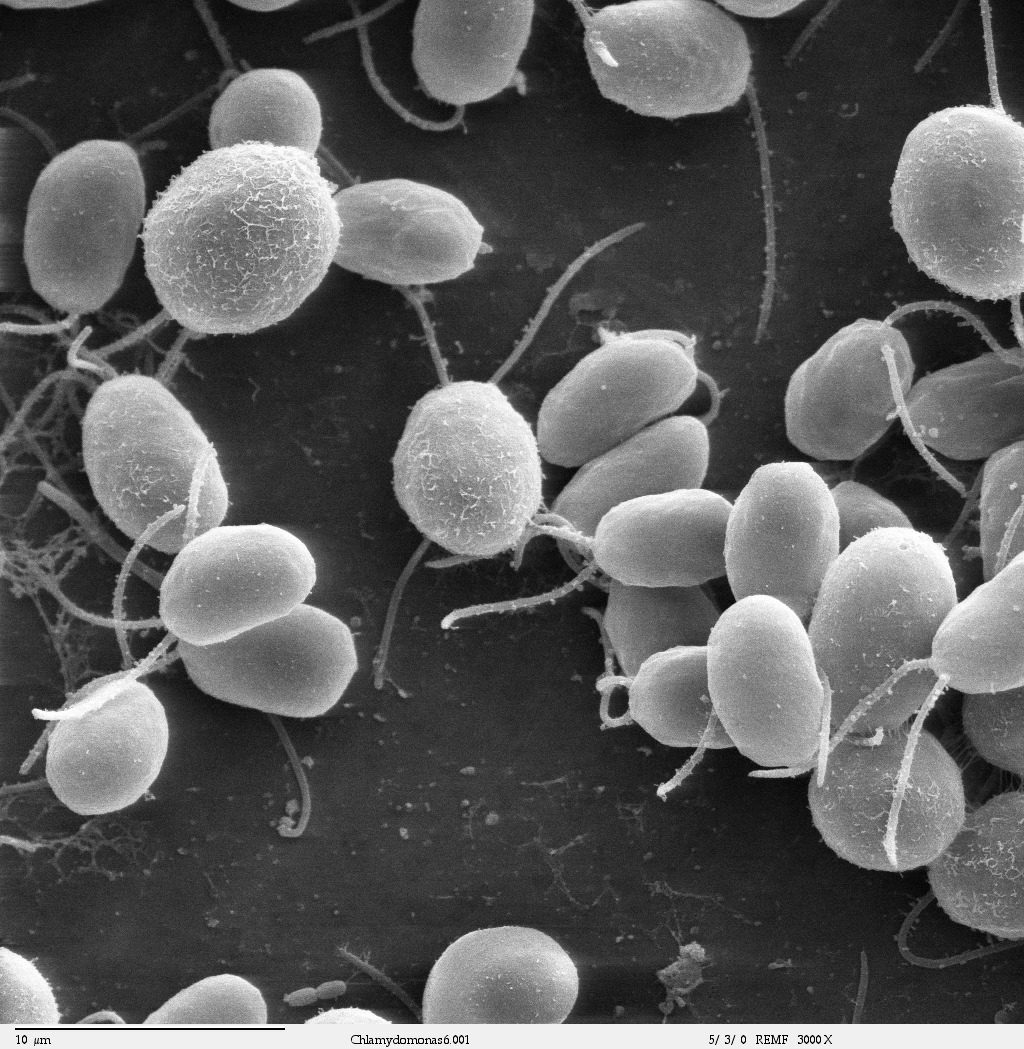
- Electron microscope image of Chlamydomonas reinhardtii

Scientific classification
- Kingdom: Plantae
- Division: Chlorophyta
- Class: Chlorophyceae
- Order: Chlamydomonadales
- Family: Chlamydomonadaceae; F.Stein

= Chlamydomonadaceae =

Family of algae

Chlamydomonadaceae is a family of algae within the order Chlamydomonadales. Traditionally, it has been defined as containing single-celled flagellates with a cell wall.

Cells of the Chlamydomonadaceae are motile and have one, two, or four flagella. The cell body is covered in a cell wall, with the protoplast entirely or partially lined up next to the wall. Cells are uninucleate (i.e. with one nucleus). There is generally a single chloroplast, which is often cup-shaped or sometimes stellate or discoid; pyrenoids may be present or absent. Some species lack chlorophyll entirely and are saprotrophic. Contractile vacuoles may or may not be present. There is usually a single eyespot.

Asexual reproduction occurs when the cell protoplast divides to form two, four, or eight daughter cells, with cell walls forming while still in the parent cell wall. Before cell division, the flagella usually disappear. Daughter cells are typically liberated when the parent cell wall gelatinizes, or through a rupture in the parent cell wall. In some cases, cells may produce several generations before eventually developing flagella and escaping the parent cell wall. This stage, known as the palmella stage, have been reported in a number of genera.

Sexual reproduction occurs in this family, and ranges from isogamy to anisogamy to oogamy. Some species are homothallic, while others are heterothallic. Zygotes have thick walls, and they typically are inactive before germination. Usually four or more zoospores germinate from each zygote.

== Genera ==
As accepted by WoRMS;

- Agloë Pascher, 1912
- Brachiomonas Bohlin, 1897
- Carteria Diesing, 1866
- Chlainomonas H.R.Christen, 1959
- Chlamydomonas Ehrenberg, 1833
- Chlamydonephris H.Ettl & O.Ettl, 1959
- Chlorobrachis Korshikov, 1925
- Chloroceras Schiller, 1927
- Chlorominima F.E.Gálvez, 2021
- Chloromonas Gobi, 1899-1900
- Chlorotriangulum Kufferath, 1914
- Corbierea P.-A.Dangeard, 1888
- Costachloris H.Ettl & O.Ettl, 1959
- Cylindromonas Hansgirg, 1888
- Diplostauron A.A.Korschikov, 1925
- Furcilla A.Stokes, 1890
- Gigantochloris Pascher, 1927
- Gloeomonas Klebs, 1886
- Heterochlamydomonas E.R.Cox & T.R.Deason, 1969
- Hirtusochloris H.J.Hu & L.M.Luo
- Hyalobrachion Swindell, 1939
- Isococcus F.E.Fritsch
- Ixipapillifera Nakada, 2016
- Lobochlamys T.Pröschold, B.Marin, U.W.Schlösser & M.Melkonian, 2001
- Lobomonas P.-A.Dangeard, 1899
- Microglena Ehrenberg, 1832
- Oltmannsiella Zimmermann, 1930
- Oogamochlamys T.Pröschold, B.Marin, U.W.Schlösser & M.Melkonian, 2001
- Parapolytoma Jameson, 1914
- Peterfiella Gerloff, 1940
- Phyllariochloris Pascher & Jahoda, 1928
- Polytoma Ehrenberg, 1831
- Pithiscus P.-A.Dangeard, 1888
- Provasoliella A.R.Loeblich III, 1967
- Pseudocarteria H.Ettl, 1958
- Pseudofurcilla Jane, 1943
- Pyramichlamys H.Ettl & O.Ettl, 1959
- Rhysamphichloris Nakada, 2016
- Sanguina Leya, Procházková & Nedbalová, 2019
- Selenochloris Pascher, 1927
- Smithsonimonas Kol, 1942
- Sphaerella S.C.Sommerfelt
- Sphenochloris Pascher, 1922
- Spirogonium Pascher, 1927
- Tetrablepharis Senn ex Wille, 1909
- Tetratoma Buetschli, 1884
- Tussetia Pascher, 1927
- Vitreochlamys Batko, 1970

Former genera:

- Platychloris Pascher, 1927 accepted as Chloromonas
- Prasinochlamydomonas Chadefaud, 1954 accepted as Chlamydonephris
- Protococcus C.Agardh, 1824 accepted as Chlamydomonas (synonym)
- Sphaerellopsis Korshikov, 1925 accepted as Vitreochlamys (synonym)

The family is known to be non-monophyletic, with clades not aligning to traditionally defined morphological groupings.
