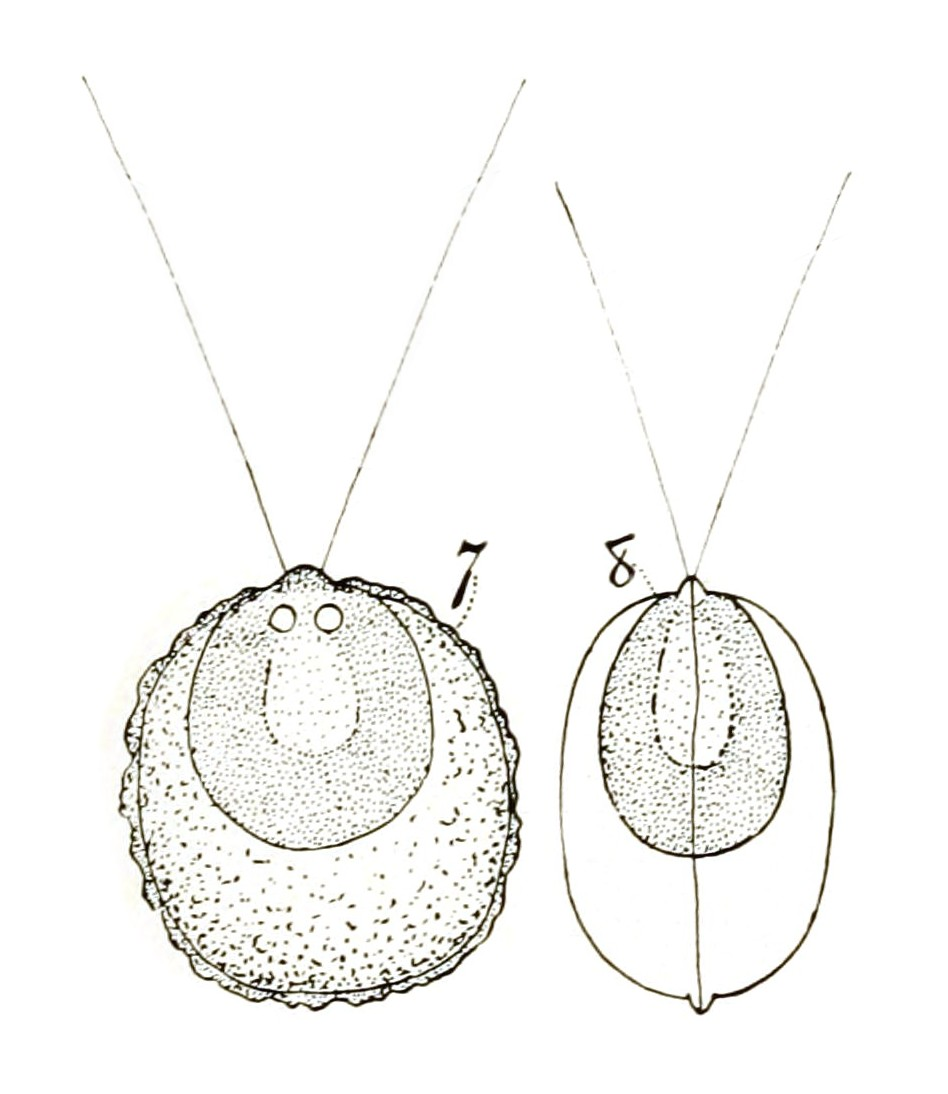
- Phacotus crassus

Scientific classification
- Kingdom: Plantae
- Division: Chlorophyta
- Class: Chlorophyceae
- Order: Chlamydomonadales
- Family: Phacotaceae
- Genus: Phacotus; Perty

Type species
- Phacotus lenticularis (Ehrenberg) Diesing

Species
- Phacotus lenticularis; Phacotus sphaericus

= Phacotus =

Genus of algae

Phacotus is a genus of green algae in the family Phacotaceae. It is found in freshwater, and can be plentiful in temperate hardwater lakes.

== Description ==
Phacotus is a single-celled, uninucleate, motile organism in which the protoplast is contained with a rigid shell, termed a lorica. The lorica is strongly compressed, colorless to brownish, and consists of two equal parts attached together. The lorica may be smooth, slightly rough or ornamented. The lorica is made of a mixture of carbohydrates, proteins, sulfates, and various minerals including calcite. Under cross-polarized light, the lorica displays two slightly different appearances; one of these may occasionally feature a red ring near the perimeter. This difference could represent the outer and inner views of the loricae, as they typically separate after the organism's death.

The protoplast is slightly smaller than the lorica. The chloroplast is cup-shaped, parietal, with an anterior stigma and a pyrenoid. The two flagella emerge from a single opening or two openings within the lorica. Two contractile vacuoles are present at the base of the flagella.

Asexual reproduction occurs via the formation of two, four, eight or 16 zoospores. The zoospores develop within a gelatinous sporangium, which expands after the two shells of the lorica separate. Sexual reproduction has been reported and is isogamous, but rare.
