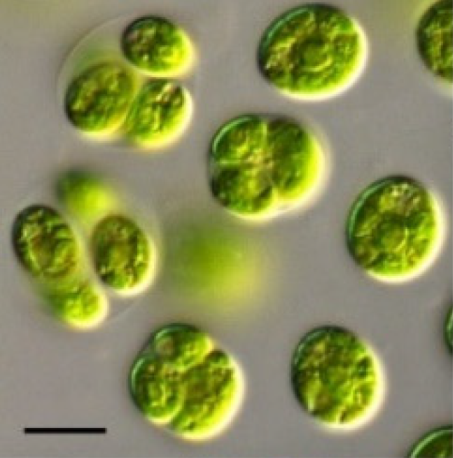
- Chlamydocapsa sp.

Scientific classification
- Kingdom: Plantae
- Division: Chlorophyta
- Class: Chlorophyceae
- Order: Chlamydomonadales
- Family: Palmellopsidaceae
- Genus: Chlamydocapsa; Fott

Type species
- Chlamydocapsa ampla (Kützing) Fott

= Chlamydocapsa =

Genus of algae

Chlamydocapsa is a genus of green algae in the class Chlorophyceae.

Chlamydocapsa consists of cells similar in structure to Chlamydomonas, although vegetative cells lack flagella and are therefore not motile. Cells are in colonies of two, four, eight, or more (rarely solitary) and are embedded in concentric layers of mucilage. The cells are spherical to ovoid or ellipsoid, with two contractile vacuoles a single cup-shaped chloroplast containing one pyrenoid. Reproduction occurs by the formation of zoospores with two flgaella.

Chlamydocapsa is a common and widespread genus in fresh waters. However, it is unclear whether this genus is taxonomically valid, as it may simply be a nonmotile ("palmelloid") life stage of the genus Chlamydomonas.
