= Asteromonas =

Scientific classification
- Kingdom: Plantae
- Division: Chlorophyta
- Class: Chlorophyceae
- Order: Chlamydomonadales
- Family: Asteromonadaceae
- Genus: Asteromonas; A.Artari

Type species
- Asteromonas gracilis A.Artari

Species
- Asteromonas gracilis; Asteromonas octostriata

Genus of algae

Asteromonas is a genus of green algae in the family Asteromonadaceae. It has been described from saline, marine, and brackish environments. It is closely related to the genus Dunaliella, another genus common in saline waters.

Asteromonas is a single-celled, motile organism. Two flagella extend from the anterior end of the cell. The cells are cone-shaped and have four to eight longitudinal projections, or ribs; When viewed from the pole they are therefore shaped like a four- to eight-pointed star. Cells lack cell walls but a periplast is present, made of crystalline glycoprotein. Contractile vacuoles are absent. Cells are uninucleate and have a single chloroplast filling the cell, sometimes with a pyrenoid, and one stigma.

Species of Asteromonas are distinguished from each other by the shape of the cells. The genus Stephanoptera is closely related and sometimes considered synonymous with Asteromonas.

Asteromonas reproduces via both asexual and sexual reproduction. Asexual reproduction occurs by longitudinal division, and sexual reproduction occurs via hologamy, where the gametes are similar in size and shape to the vegetative cells.
