= Characiochloris =

Scientific classification
- Kingdom: Plantae
- Division: Chlorophyta
- Class: Chlorophyceae
- Order: Chlamydomonadales
- Family: Characiochloridaceae
- Genus: Characiochloris; Pascher

Type species
- Characiochloris characioides Pascher

Species
- Characiochloris acuminata; Characiochloris characioides; Characiochloris sasae

Genus of algae

Characiochloris is a genus of green algae in the family Characiochloridaceae. Characiochloris is epiphytic on freshwater algae, or found in soil.

== Description ==
Characiochloris is a unicellular organism in which the cells are attached to a substrate by an adhesive pad. They are egg-shaped to spindle-shaped with the apical end attached to the substrate. Cells are always uninucleate (with one nucleus). The chloroplast is parietal, usually dissected into many elongated lobes, and with one or more pyrenoids. Some species have a stigma. Contractile vacuoles are present, and irregular distributed throughout the cell. Often there are short, vestigial flagella that project from the proximal end.

Characiochloris reproduces asexually via aplanospores, or biflagellate zoospores. Each zoospore has a band-shaped chloroplast, a pyrenoid, a stigma, and contractile vacuoles. Sexual reproduction has not been observed in this genus.

Species are separated from each other by their size and shape, number of pyrenoids, their chloroplast morphology, and the number of zoospores produced per cell.
