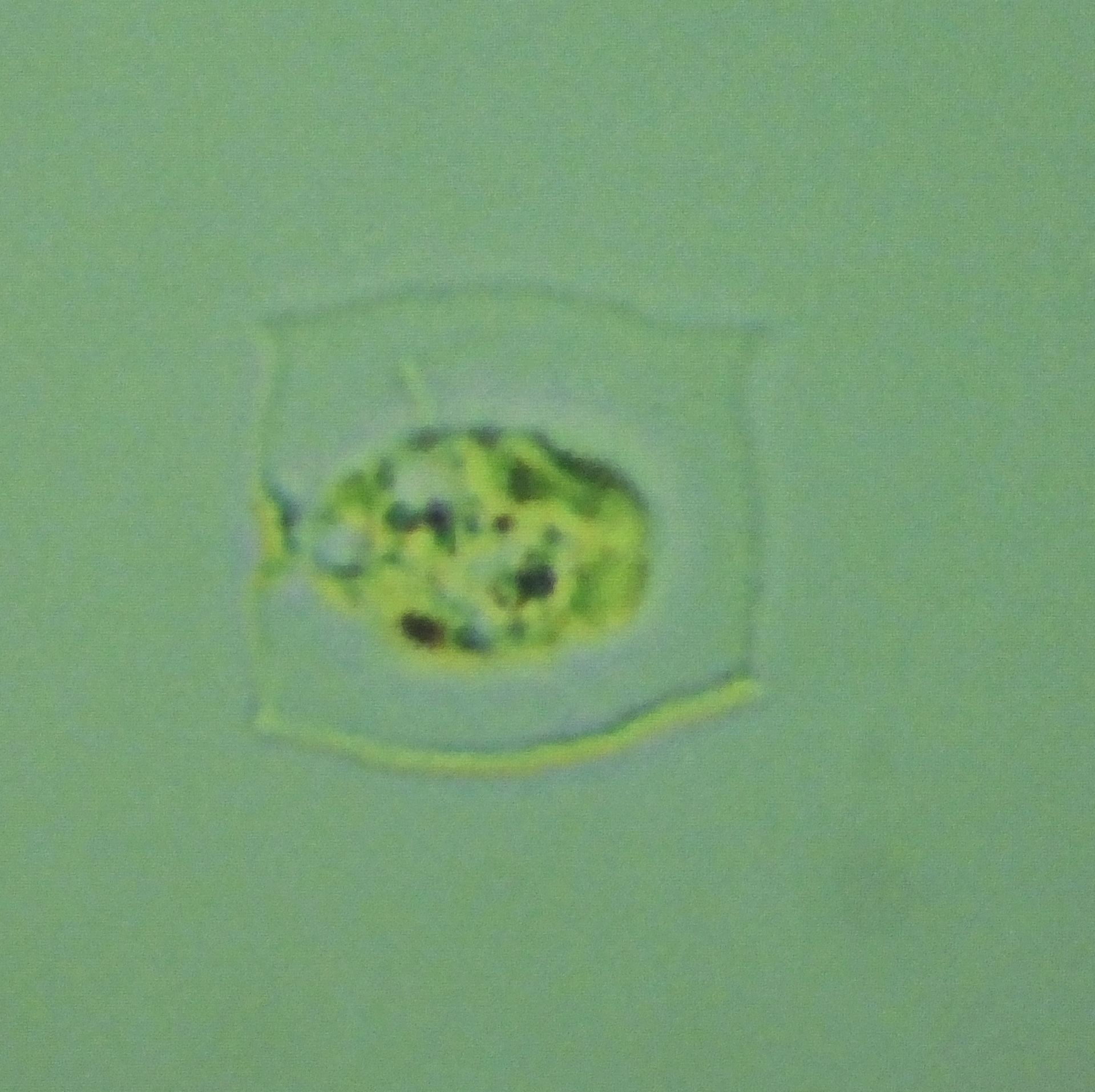

Scientific classification
- Kingdom: Plantae
- Division: Chlorophyta
- Class: Chlorophyceae
- Order: Chlamydomonadales
- Family: Phacotaceae
- Genus: Pteromonas; Seligo

Type species
- Pteromonas aculeata Seligo

Species
- Pteromonas aculeata; Pteromonas angulosa; Pteromonas golenkiniana; Pteromonas protracta

= Pteromonas =

Genus of algae

Pteromonas is a genus of green algae in the family Phacotaceae. It has a cosmopolitan distribution, and mainly occurs in nutrient-rich freshwaters.

Pteromonas is a unicellular, motile organism with two flagella; the protoplast of the cell is contained in a transparent, flattened shell called a lorica. The two flagella emerge from separate openings in the anterior of the lorica. The lorica consists of two equal parts pressed together at their margins, forming a keel. The lorica is variously shaped, and may be undulate or spiny. The protoplast is pyriform, ovoid or globose and compressed. Cells contain a cup-shaped chloroplast with one or more pyrenoids and usually an stigma. Two contractile vacuoles are present at the base of the flagella.

Asexual reproduction involves the division of the protoplast into two or four daughter cells, which are released when the two halves of the lorica separate. Sexual reproduction is isogamous; the two gametes fuse and develop into a globose zygote with a smooth cell wall.

Species are distinguished based on the general morphology (size, shape and placement of "wings") of the lorica, and number and position of pyrenoids.
