= Pseudodictyochloris =

Scientific classification
- Clade: Viridiplantae
- Division: Chlorophyta
- Class: Chlorophyceae
- Order: Chlamydomonadales
- Family: Actinochloridaceae
- Genus: Pseudodictyochloris; Vinatzer, 1975

Type species
- Pseudodictyochloris dissecta Vinatzer

Species
- P. dissecta; P. multinucleata

Genus of algae

Pseudodictyochloris is a genus of green algae, in the family Actinochloridaceae. It is found in soils.

Pseudodictyochloris is a unicellular organism. Young cells are ellipsoidal to ovoid in shape, while adult cells are spherical. The chloroplast lines the periphery of the cell and is net-like with many perforations, with a few strands connected to the center. Chloroplasts lack pyrenoids. Cells are multinucleate (with many nuclei). Asexual reproduction occurs by the formation of zoospores or autospores.
