= Nautocapsa =

Scientific classification
- Kingdom: Plantae
- Division: Chlorophyta
- Class: Chlorophyceae
- Order: Chlamydomonadales
- Family: Palmellopsidaceae
- Genus: Nautocapsa; H.Ettl & O.Ettl

Species
- Nautocapsa neustophila (Czosnowski) H.Ettl & O.Ettl

Genus of algae

Nautocapsa is a green algae genus in the family Palmellopsidaceae.
