= Protosiphon =

Scientific classification
- Clade: Viridiplantae
- Division: Chlorophyta
- Class: Chlorophyceae
- Order: Chlamydomonadales
- Family: Protosiphonaceae
- Genus: Protosiphon; Klebs, 1886

Species
- P. botryoides Klebs, 1896; P. cinnamomeus (Menegh) Drouet & Daily, 1948

Genus of algae

Protosiphon is a genus of green algae in the class Chlorophyceae.

This is one of the few algae that do not go through fragmentation.
