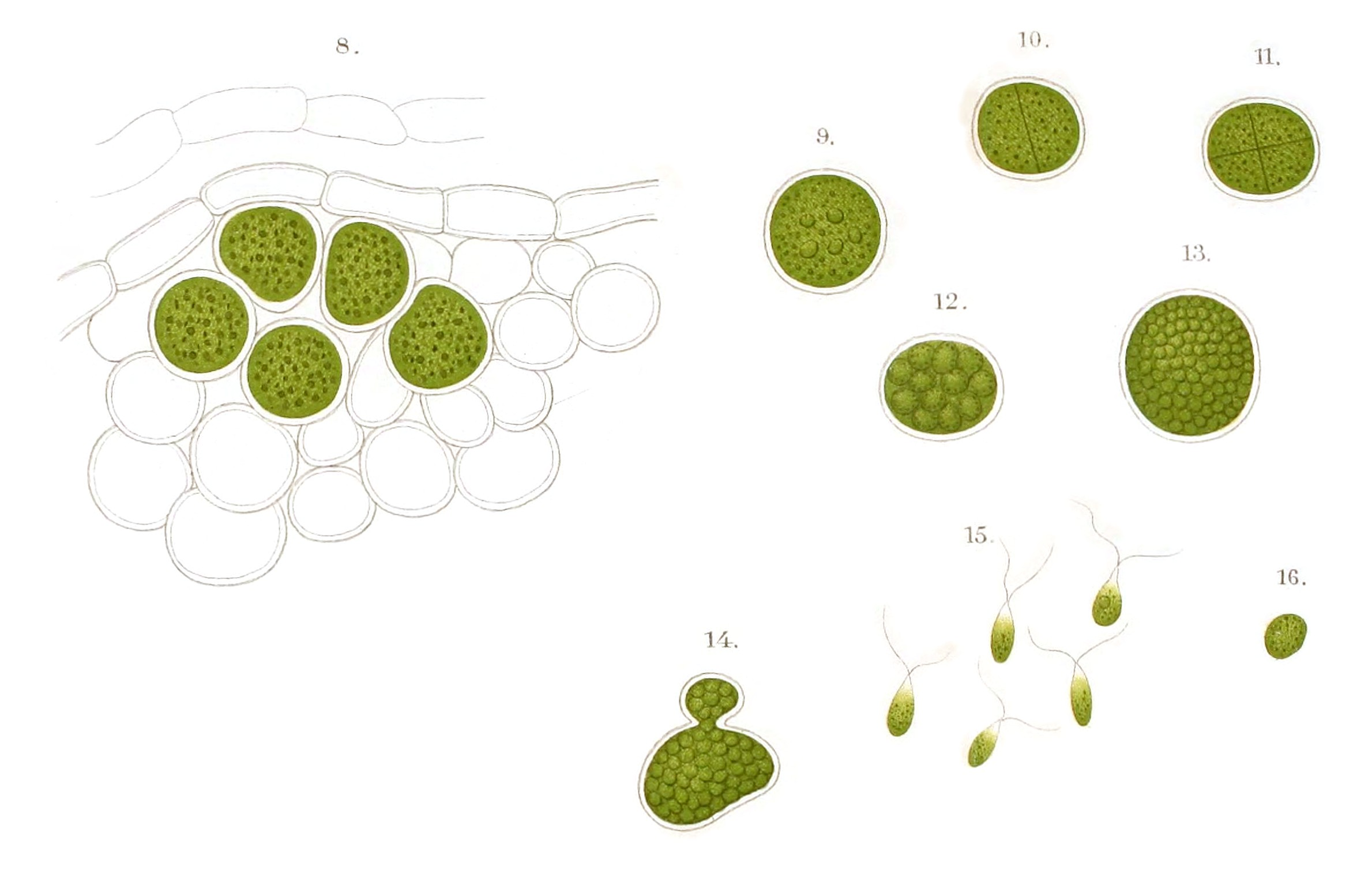
- Chlorosphaeropsis alismatis

Scientific classification
- Clade: Viridiplantae
- Division: Chlorophyta
- Class: Chlorophyceae
- Order: Chlamydomonadales
- Family: Chlorosarcinaceae
- Genus: Chlorosphaeropsis; Vischer

Species
- C. alveolata

= Chlorosphaeropsis =

Genus of algae

Chlorosphaeropsis is a genus of algae, specifically of the Chlorosarcinales.
