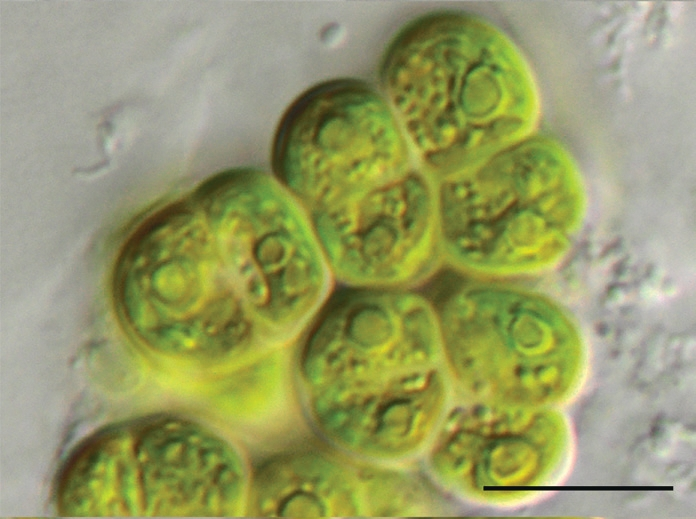

Scientific classification
- Kingdom: Plantae
- Division: Chlorophyta
- Class: Chlorophyceae
- Order: Chlamydomonadales
- Family: Chlorosarcinaceae
- Genus: Chlorosarcinopsis; Herndon

Species
- C. minor; C. bastropiensis; C. gelatinosa; C. arenicola; C. communis; C. delicata; C. dissociata; C. eremi; C. variabilis; C. aggregata

= Chlorosarcinopsis =

Genus of algae

Chlorosarcinopsis is a genus of green algae, specifically of the Chlamydomonadales.
