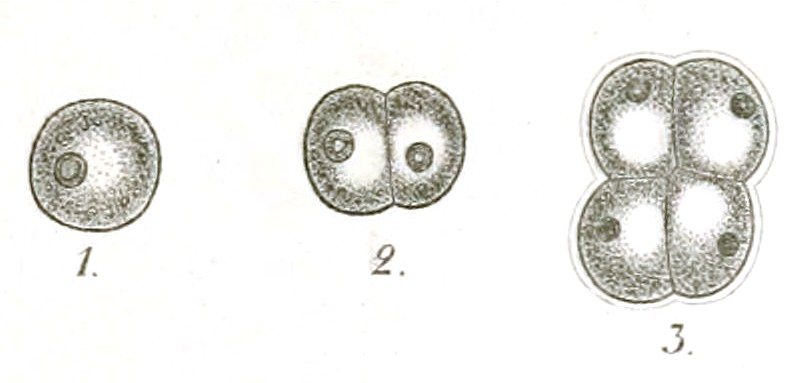
- Neochlorosarcina minor

Scientific classification
- Clade: Viridiplantae
- Division: Chlorophyta
- Class: Chlorophyceae
- Order: Chlamydomonadales
- Family: Chlorosarcinaceae
- Genus: Neochlorosarcina; S.Watanabe

Species
- Neochlorosarcina auxotrophica (R.D.Groover & Bold) Shin Watanabe; Neochlorosarcina deficiens (R.D.Groover & Bold) Shin Watanabe; Neochlorosarcina minor (Gerneck) V.M.Andreyeva; Neochlorosarcina minuta (R.D.Groover & Bold) Shin Watanabe; Neochlorosarcina negevensis (Friedmann & Ocampo-Paus) Shin Watanabe; Neochlorosarcina pseudominor (R.D.Groover & Bold) Shin Watanabe; Neochlorosarcina sempervirens (R.D.Groover & Bold) Shin Watanabe

= Neochlorosarcina =

Genus of algae

Neochlorosarcina is a genus of green algae, specifically of the Chlamydomonadales.
