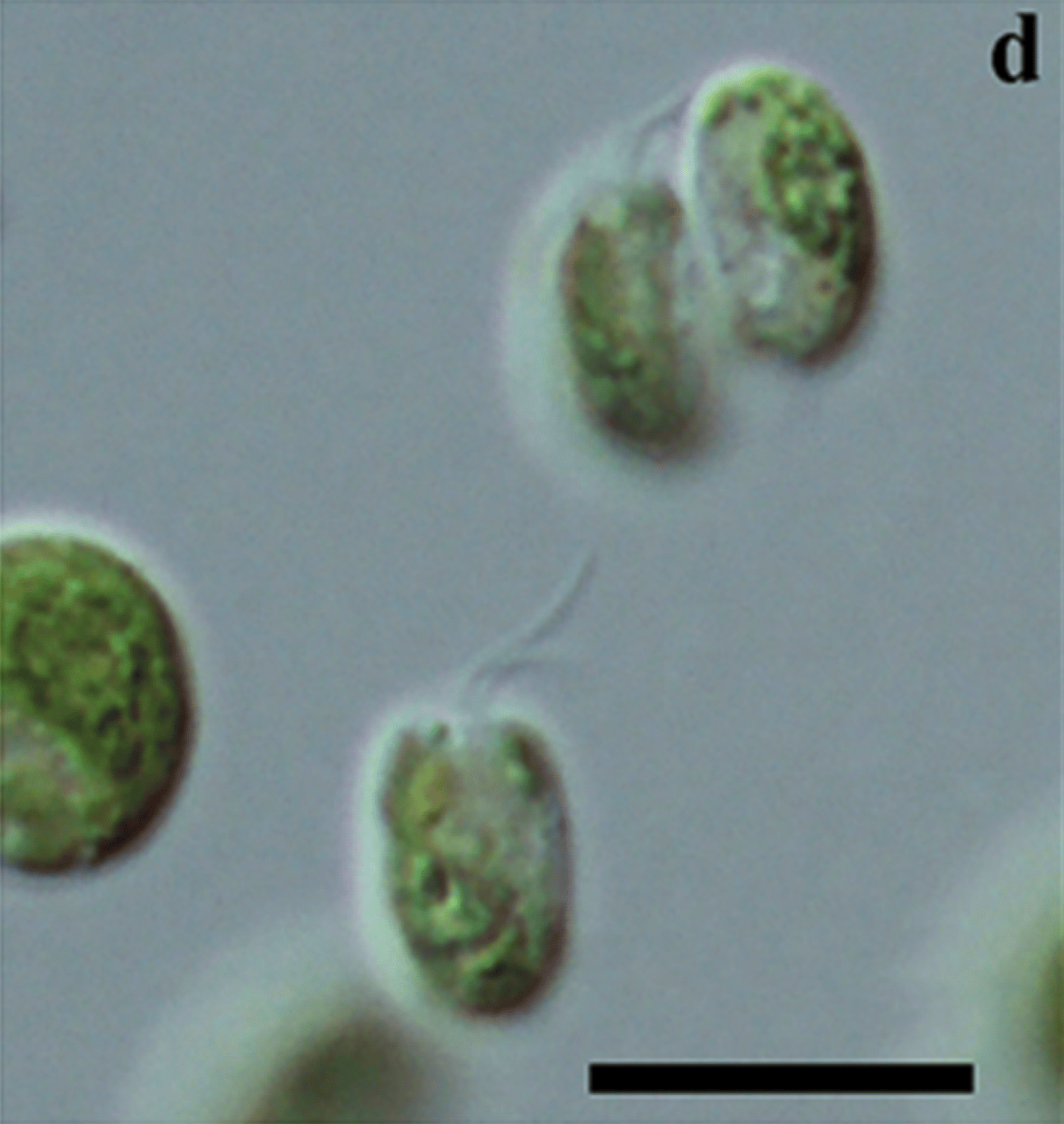
- Heterochlamydomonas uralensis

Scientific classification
- Kingdom: Plantae
- Division: Chlorophyta
- Class: Chlorophyceae
- Order: Chlamydomonadales
- Family: Chlamydomonadaceae
- Genus: Heterochlamydomonas; E.R.Cox & T.R.Deason, 1969

Species
- Heterochlamydomonas inaequalis; Heterochlamydomonas lobata; Heterochlamydomonas rugosa

= Heterochlamydomonas =

Genus of green algae

Heterochlamydomonas is a genus of green algae in the order Chlamydomonadales.
