= Kremastochloris =

Scientific classification
- Clade: Viridiplantae
- Division: Chlorophyta
- Class: Chlorophyceae
- Order: Chlamydomonadales
- Family: Hypnomonadaceae
- Genus: Kremastochloris; Pascher, 1942
- Species: K. conus

Binomial name
- Kremastochloris conus Pascher, 1942

Genus of algae

Kremastochloris is a genus of green algae, in the family Hypnomonadaceae. Its sole species is Kremastochloris conus.
