= Hypnomonas =

Scientific classification
- Clade: Viridiplantae
- Division: Chlorophyta
- Class: Chlorophyceae
- Order: Chlamydomonadales
- Family: Hypnomonadaceae
- Genus: Hypnomonas; Korshikov, 1926

Species
- H. tuberculata

Genus of algae

Hypnomonas is a genus of green algae, in the family Hypnomonadaceae. Its sole species is Hypnomonas tuberculata.
