= Gloeococcus =

Scientific classification
- Clade: Viridiplantae
- Division: Chlorophyta
- Class: Chlorophyceae
- Order: Chlamydomonadales
- Family: Palmellopsidaceae
- Genus: Gloeococcus; A.Braun

Species
- See text.

Genus of algae

Gloeococcus is a genus of green algae in the family Palmellopsidaceae.

== Species ==
As of February 2022, AlgaeBase accepted the following species:

- Gloeococcus alsius (Skuja) Fott
- Gloeococcus braunii J.W.G.Lund
- Gloeococcus grevillei (C.Agardh) Shuttleworth
- Gloeococcus lateralis M.O.P.Iyengar
- Gloeococcus minor A.Braun
- Gloeococcus minutissimus J.M.King
- Gloeococcus mucosus A.Braun
- Gloeococcus pyriformis M.O.P.Iyengar
- Gloeococcus simplex M.O.P.Iyengar
- Gloeococcus tetrasporus Kugrens
