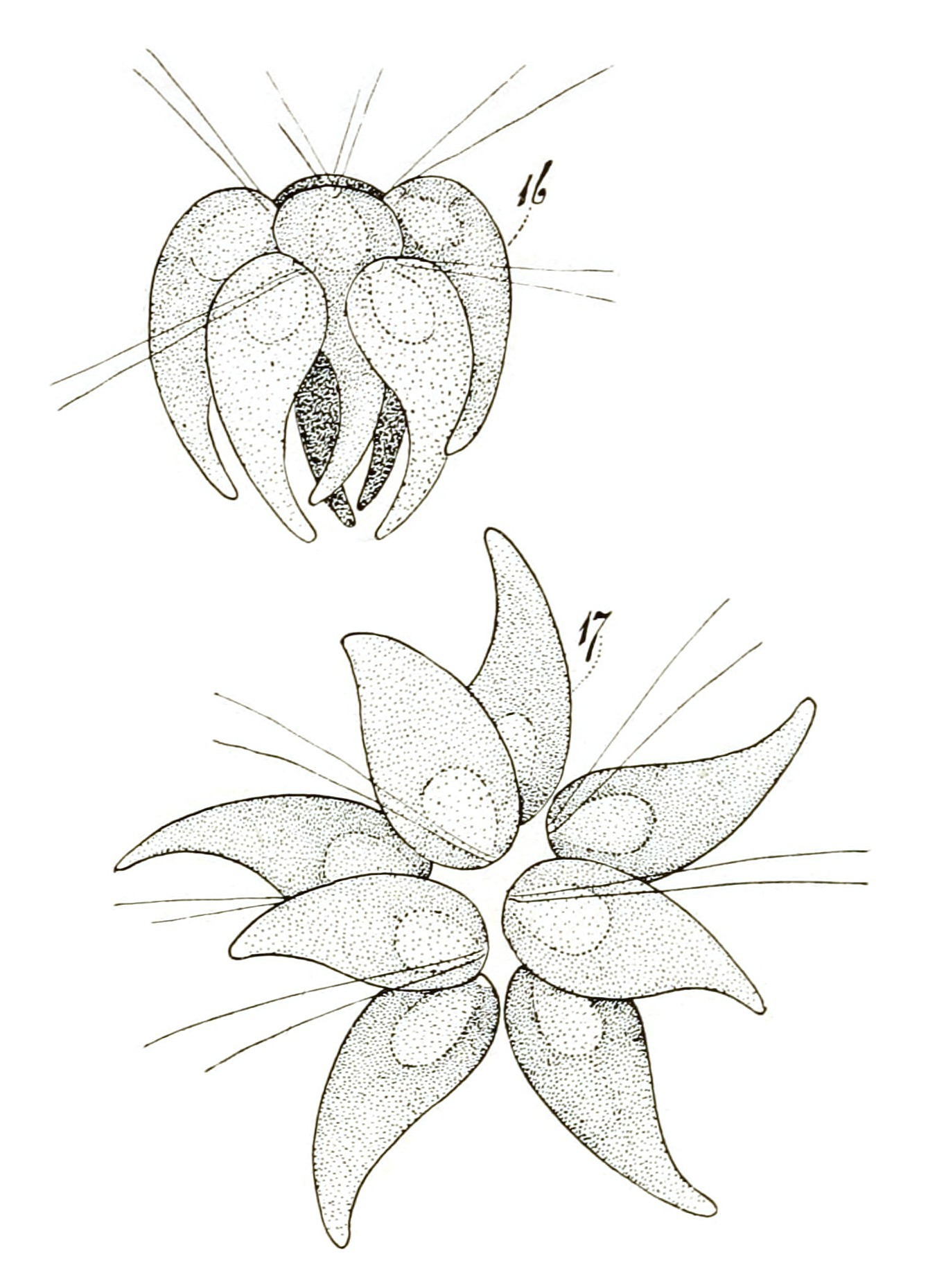
- Pyrobotrys rostratus

Scientific classification
- Kingdom: Plantae
- Division: Chlorophyta
- Class: Chlorophyceae
- Order: Chlamydomonadales
- Family: Spondylomoraceae
- Genus: Pyrobotrys; Arnoldi, 1916

Type species
- Pyrobotrys incurvus Arnoldi

Species
- Pyrobotrys acuminata Y.S.R.K.Sarma & R.Shyam; Pyrobotrys asiatica (Skvortzov) G.E.Huber-Pestalozzi; Pyrobotrys casinoensis (Playfair) P.C.Silva; Pyrobotrys casinoensis var. elongata Korshikov & Anakhin; Pyrobotrys casinoensis var. intermedia Y.S.R.K.Sarma & R.Shyam; Pyrobotrys desikacharyi Y.S.R.K.Sarma & R.Shyam; Pyrobotrys elegans (J.Behlau) H.Nozaki; Pyrobotrys elongata Korshikov; Pyrobotrys gracilis (Korshikov) Korshikov; Pyrobotrys incurva W.M.Arnoldi - type; Pyrobotrys korschikovii (L.A.Schkorbatov) Korshikov; Pyrobotrys minima H.Ettl; Pyrobotrys rostrata (G.I.Playfair) G.E.Huber-Pestalozzi; Pyrobotrys squarrosa (Korshikov) Korshikov; Pyrobotrys stellata (Korshikov) Korshikov

= Pyrobotrys =

Genus of algae

Pyrobotrys is a genus of green algae in the family Spondylomoraceae. It has a cosmopolitan distribution, found in fresh water rich in organic matter.

Pyrobotrys consists of colonies (termed coenobia) of four, eight or 16 arranged in two or four tiers, with a star- or mulberry-like shape. Cells are spherical, ovoid, ellipsoid, or pear-shaped. Each has two equal flagella, two contractile vacuoles at the base of the flagella, and a large cup-shaped chloroplast with or without a stigma with no pyrenoids.

Pyrobotrys reproduces both asexually and sexually. In asexual reproduction, each cell of the colony divides to form a daughter colony. In sexual reproduction, cells divide into 4, 8, 16, or 32 biflagellate isogametes, which fuse to form planozygotes, with four flagella. Upon germination, the planozygotes divide into four "gone cells" which then develop into new colonies.

Species of Pyrobotrys are distinguished based on the shape of the cells, number of cells in a colony, presence or absence of a stigma, and shape of the planozygote.
