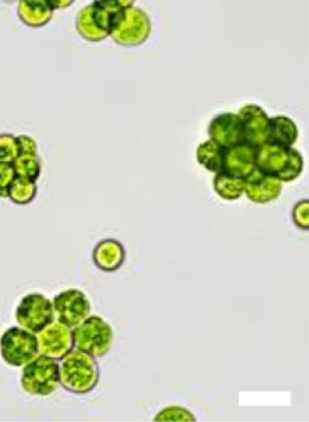
- Deasonia sp.

Scientific classification
- Clade: Viridiplantae
- Division: Chlorophyta
- Class: Chlorophyceae
- Order: Chlamydomonadales
- Family: Actinochloridaceae
- Genus: Deasonia; H. Ettl & J. Komárek, 1982

Type species
- Deasonia prolifera (T.R.Deason) H.Ettl & J.Komárek

Species
- D. bispora; D. irregularis; D. multinucleata; D. prolifera; D. punctata; D. saccata

= Deasonia =

Genus of algae

Deasonia is a genus of green algae, in the family Actinochloridaceae. It is found in soils.

Deasonia is a single-celled organism. Young cells are ellipsoidal or ovoid, while mature cells are consistently spherical with a smooth, thickened cell wall. In young cells, the chloroplast is cup-shaped and parietal, with an off-center pyrenoid; in mature cells, the chloroplast may have bifurcations and indentations and eventually forms an irregular network, with the pyrenoid in the center. Mature cells are multinucleate.
