= Pseudotetracystis =

Scientific classification
- Clade: Viridiplantae
- Division: Chlorophyta
- Class: Chlorophyceae
- Order: Chlamydomonadales
- Family: Chlorosarcinaceae
- Genus: Pseudotetracystis; R.D.Arneson, 1973

Type species
- Pseudotetracystis terrestris

Genus of algae

Pseudotetracystis is a genus of green algae, in the family Chlorosarcinaceae.
