= Wislouchiella =

Scientific classification
- Kingdom: Plantae
- Division: Chlorophyta
- Class: Chlorophyceae
- Order: Chlamydomonadales
- Family: Phacotaceae
- Genus: Wislouchiella; Skvortzov, 1925

Species
- Wislouchiella planctonica

Genus of algae

Wislouchiella is a genus of green algae in the order Chlamydomonadales.
