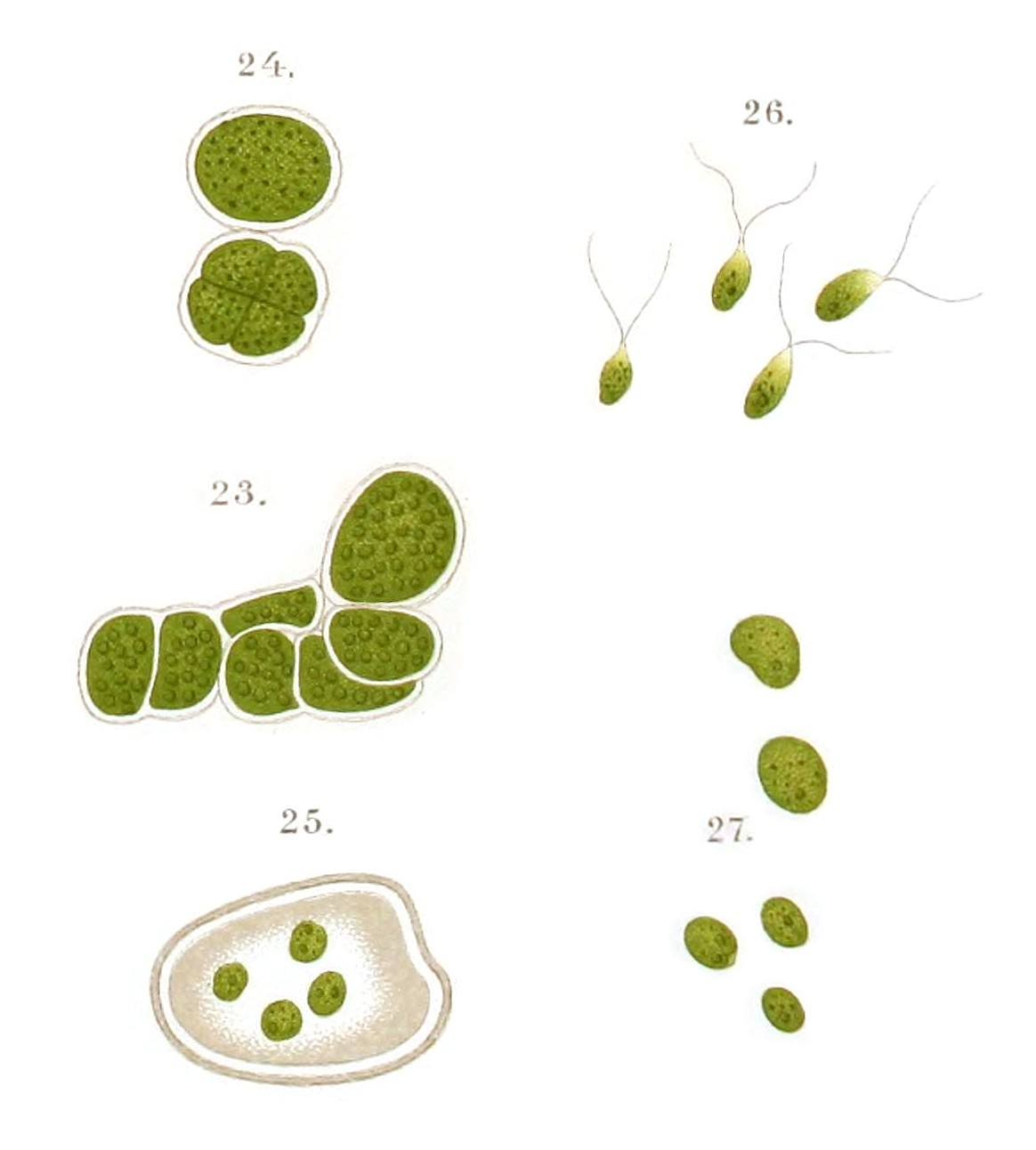
- Chlorosarcina consociata

Scientific classification
- Clade: Viridiplantae
- Division: Chlorophyta
- Class: Chlorophyceae
- Order: Chlamydomonadales
- Family: Chlorosarcinaceae
- Genus: Chlorosarcina; Gerneck, 1907

Type species
- Chlorosarcina elegans Gerneck, 1907

Species
- C. brevispinosa; C. stigmatica

= Chlorosarcina =

Genus of algae

Chlorosarcina is a genus of green algae, specifically of the Chlamydomonadales.
