= Pectodictyon =

Scientific classification
- Clade: Viridiplantae
- Division: Chlorophyta
- Class: Chlorophyceae
- Order: Chlamydomonadales
- Family: Sphaerodictyaceae
- Genus: Pectodictyon; Taft

Type species
- Pectodictyon cubicum Taft

Species
- See text

Genus of algae

Pectodictyon is a genus of green algae in the family Sphaerodictyaceae. It is found free-floating in freshwater habitats as plankton.

Pectodictyon consists of colonies of cells which are tetrahedral or cubic in shape. Each colony has four or eight cells in the corners, covered with mucilage and connected to each other by mucilaginous threads. These colonies may themselves be connected to other colonies to form compound colonies. The cells themselves are spherical or tetrahedral, with parietal chloroplasts with pyrenoids. Asexual reproduction occurs by the formation of autospores, which arrange themselves into the shape of the colony. Sexual reproduction or flagellated life stages have not been observed in this genus.

Two species are known:

- Pectodictyon cubicum
- Pectodictyon pyramidale

They can be identified by the shape of the shapes of the cells and colonies.
