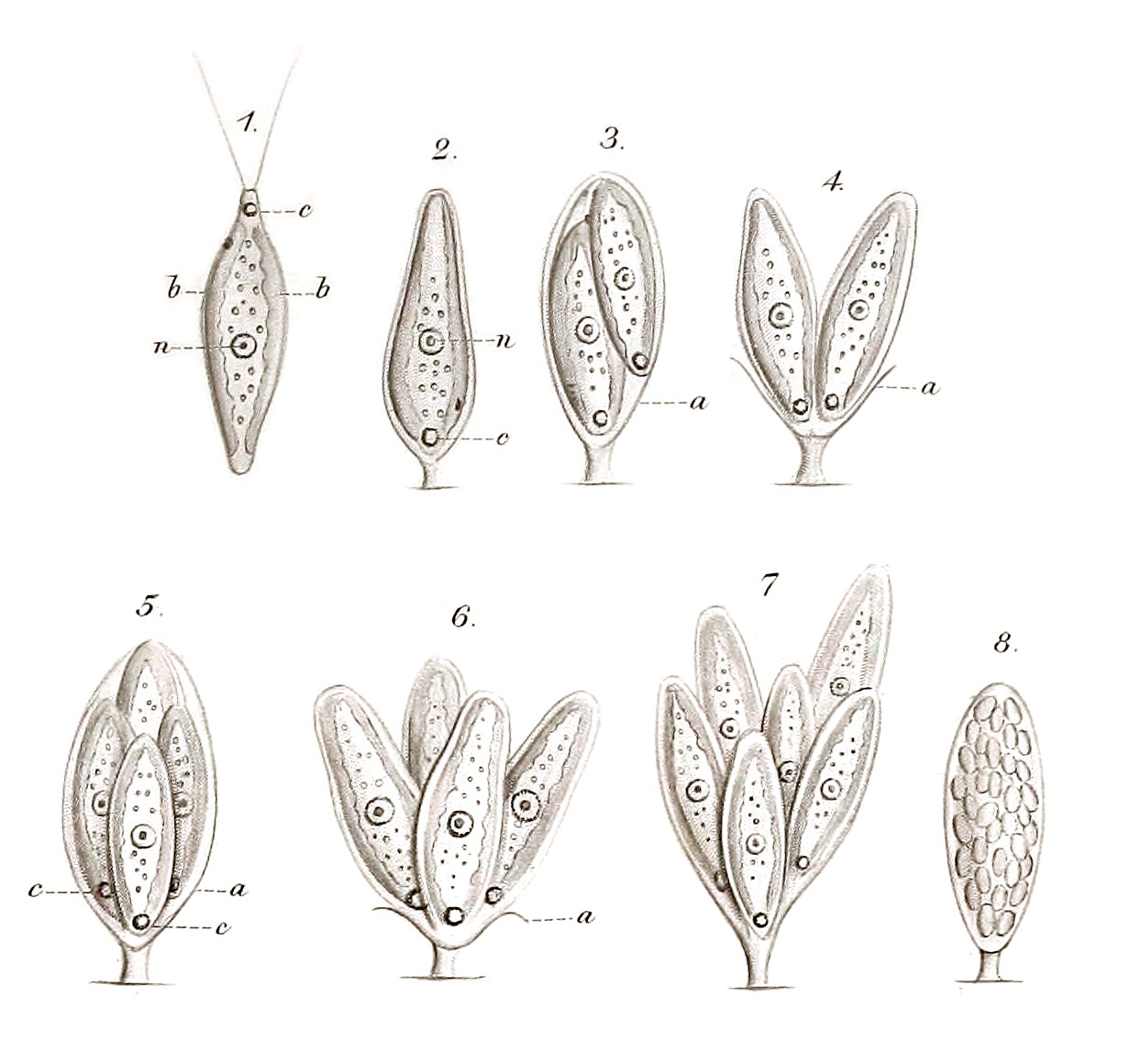
- Chlorangiella pygmaea

Scientific classification
- Clade: Viridiplantae
- Division: Chlorophyta
- Class: Chlorophyceae
- Order: Chlamydomonadales
- Family: Chlorangiellaceae
- Genus: Chlorangiella; De Toni

Type species
- Chlorangiella pygmaea (Ehrenberg) P.C.Silva

Species
- Chlorangiella asymmetrica (Korshikov) Hindák; Chlorangiella basiannulata (Skuja) P.C.Silva; Chlorangiella consociata (Korshikov) Fott; Chlorangiella inhaerens (H.Bachmann) Ettl & Gärtner; Chlorangiella javanica (Lemmermann) P.C.Silva; Chlorangiella mucigena K.R.Ramanathan; Chlorangiella polychlora (Skuja) P.C.Silva; Chlorangiella pygmaea (Ehrenberg) P.C.Silva; Chlorangiella subarctica (Skuja) Fott

= Chlorangiella =

Genus of algae

Chlorangiella is a genus of microscopic green algae, the type genus of the family Chlorangiellaceae. The name Chlorangiella was coined by Giovanni Battista de Toni in 1889. It is a nomen novum for Chlorangium F.Stein.

Species of Chlorangiella are attached via stalks to freshwater algae, crustaceans, rotifers, or insect larvae. They can attach to the substrate, such as the copepod Cyclops, in such large quantities as to make them appear green. They have been recorded from many continents, mostly in temperate habitats.

== Description ==
Chlorangiella consists of single cells or groups of cells, where the cells are borne on the ends of mucilaginous stalks. Stalks may be branched or unbranched and up to 5 times the lengths of the cells. The cells themselves are ovoid, 5–42 μm long. They contain a single cell nucleus (i.e. are uninucleate) and contractile vacuoles at their apices. Chloroplasts are one to several, parietal, and band-shaped, with or without a pyrenoid.

Asexual reproduction occurs by the formation of zoospores. The zoospores may be released at the apex of the sporangium, and swim until they settle and develop into a new organism; alternatively, they may attach at the base of the sporangium and develop a stalk. Sexual reproduction has not been observed in this genus.
