= Hypnomonadaceae =

Scientific classification
- Kingdom: Plantae
- Division: Chlorophyta
- Class: Chlorophyceae
- Order: Chlamydomonadales
- Family: Hypnomonadaceae; Korshikov, 1953

Genera
- Hypnomonas; Kremastochloris; Sphaerellocystis

Family of algae

Hypnomonadaceae is a family of green algae, in the order Chlamydomonadales.
