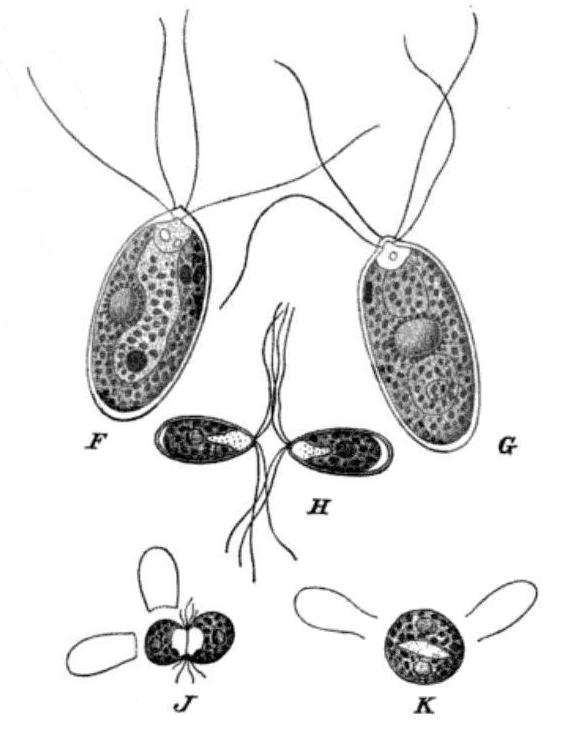
- Carteria obtusa, Dill. F, G: Vegetative cells, H, J, K: Stages of gametes mating

Scientific classification
- Domain: Eukaryota
- Supergroup: Archaeplastida
- Clade: Viridiplantae
- Division: Chlorophyta
- Class: Chlorophyceae
- Order: Chlamydomonadales
- Family: Chlamydomonadaceae
- Genus: Carteria; Diesing

Species
- Carteria crucifera; Carteria radiosa; Carteria eugametos; Carteria olivieri; Carteria inversa; Carteria cerasiformis; Carteria obtusa; Carteria sp. UTEX2; Carteria lunzensis; Carteria palmata

= Carteria =

Genus of algae

Carteria is a genus of green algae in the family Chlamydomonadaceae. Carteria are similar in morphology to the common genus Chlamydomonas and differ by having four, rather than two, flagella at the vegetative stage.

The genus name of Carteria is in honour of Henry John Carter, (1813–1895), who was a surgeon working in Bombay, India, who carried out work in geology, paleontology, and zoology.

The genus was circumscribed by Karl Moriz Diesing in Sitzungsber. Kaiserl. Akad. Wiss., Wien, Math.-Nat. Cl., Abt. Vol.1 Issue 52 on page 356 in 1866.

== Description ==
Carteria is a single-celled organism. The cell is surrounded by a conspicuous wall which is often differentiated into a papilla at the anterior of the cell. There are four flagella, inserted at the location of the papilla, with a cruciate arrangement. Cells contain a single chloroplast. Pyrenoids are present, with one or several. There are often two contractile vacuoles per cell.

Asexual reproduction occurs via zoospore formation within the parent cell wall. The mode of sexual reproduction varies within Carteria: some species are isogamous, while Carteria obtusa is anisogamous.

== Taxonomy ==
Over seventy species of Carteria have been described from freshwater and terrestrial habitats. The chloroplast shape is species-specific and provides the basis for classification.

Among the 4-flagellate algae, various genera have been split off from Carteria based on morphological evidence. Among them are Provasoliella, which lacks pyrenoids, and Pseudocarteria, which has multiple (more than two) contractile vacuoles dispersed throughout the cytoplasm.

It is likely that additional research will lead to further revision of this genus. Based on the ultrastructure of the flagellar basal bodies, Lembi et al. divided Carteria into two groups. Group I contains spherical cells with flagellar bodies oriented in a cross. Group II contains ellipsoidal cells with flagellar bodies oriented in a four-armed spiral. Molecular data also agree with this grouping; the two groups together do not form a monophyletic group.
