= Chlorosarcina elegans =

Scientific classification
- Clade: Viridiplantae
- Division: Chlorophyta
- Class: Chlorophyceae
- Order: Chlamydomonadales
- Family: Chlorosarcinaceae
- Genus: Chlorosarcina
- Species: C. elegans

Binomial name
- Chlorosarcina elegans Gerneck, 1907

Species of alga

Chlorosarcina elegans is a species of green algae in the family Chlorosarcinaceae.

It is the type species of its genus. It is a terrestrial species.
