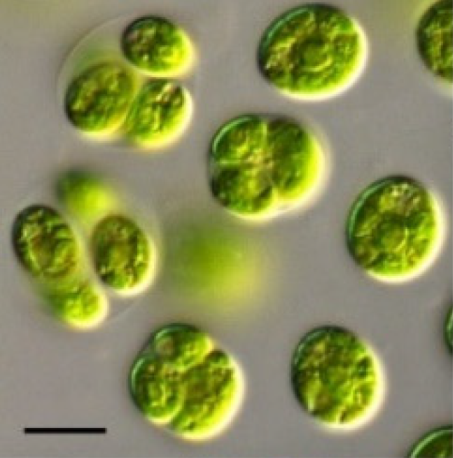
- Chlamydocapsa sp.

Scientific classification
- Kingdom: Plantae
- Division: Chlorophyta
- Class: Chlorophyceae
- Order: Chlamydomonadales
- Family: Palmellopsidaceae; Korshikov

Genera
- Apiococcus; Asterococcus; Chlamydocapsa; Gloeococcus; Nautocapsa; Palmellopsis; Ploeotila; Pseudosphaerocystis; Pseudotetraspora; Schizodictyon; Sphaerellocystis; Tetrasporidium

= Palmellopsidaceae =

Family of algae

Palmellopsidaceae is a green algae family in the order Chlamydomonadales.

Members of the Palmellopsidaceae consist of cells that are solitary or in groups of several to many, often forming large, macroscopic colonies. Cells are often surrounded by a gelatinous layer, which may be colored yellow to brown due to deposits of iron hydroxide and manganese compounds. Some taxa have true flagella enabling the cells some limited movement. Reproduction occurs by the formation of flagellated swarmers or zoospores.
