= Acidocalcisome =

Acidocalcisomes are rounded electron-dense acidic organelles, rich in calcium and polyphosphate and between 100 nm and 200 nm in diameter.

Acidocalcisomes were originally discovered in Trypanosomes (the causing agents of sleeping sickness and Chagas disease) but have since been found in Toxoplasma gondii (causes toxoplasmosis), Plasmodium (malaria), Chlamydomonas reinhardtii (a green alga), Dictyostelium discoideum (a slime mould), bacteria and human platelets. Their membranes are 6 nm thick and contain a number of protein pumps and antiporters, including aquaporins, ATPases and Ca^{2+}/H^{+} and Na^{+}/H^{+} antiporters. They may be the only cellular organelle that has been conserved between prokaryotic and eukaryotic organisms. They behave differently in different organisms and therefore it may be possible to design drugs that target acidocalcisomes in parasites but not those in the host.

Acidocalcisomes have been implied in osmoregulation. They were detected in vicinity of the contractile vacuole in Trypanosoma cruzi and were shown to fuse with the vacuole when the cells were exposed to osmotic stress. Presumably the acidocalcisomes empty their ion contents into the contractile vacuole, thereby increasing the vacuole's osmolarity. This then causes water from the cytoplasm to enter the vacuole, until the latter gathers a certain amount of water and expels it out of the cell.
