= Sphaerodictyaceae =

Scientific classification
- Kingdom: Plantae
- Division: Chlorophyta
- Class: Chlorophyceae
- Order: Chlamydomonadales
- Family: Sphaerodictyaceae; C.-C. Jao 1978

Genera
- Pectodictyon; Sphaerodictyon

Family of algae

Sphaerodictyaceae is a family of green algae, in the order Chlamydomonadales.

The algae are colonial, freshwater phytoplankton. Cells are spherical, fusiform, or pyramidal, regularly dispersed in a gelatinous matrix with a shape characteristic of the genus. Reproduction occurs by the formation of autospores.
