= Sphaerellocystis =

Scientific classification
- Kingdom: Plantae
- Division: Chlorophyta
- Class: Chlorophyceae
- Order: Chlamydomonadales
- Family: Palmellopsidaceae
- Genus: Sphaerellocystis; Ettl, 1960

Type species
- Sphaerellocystis ellipsoidea

Species
- See text.

Genus of algae

Sphaerellocystis is a genus of green algae in the family Palmellopsidaceae.

== Species ==
As of February 2022, the following species have been discovered and accepted by AlgaeBase:

- Sphaerellocystis ampla (Kützing) Nováková
- Sphaerellocystis aplanosporum H.W.Nichols, M.S.Nichols,.M.Thomas, J.S.Deacon & M.Veith
- Sphaerellocystis ellipsoidea Ettl
- Sphaerellocystis globosa Ettl
- Sphaerellocystis lateralis Fott & Nováková
- Sphaerellocystis pallens Ettl
- Sphaerellocystis stellata Ettl
- Sphaerellocystis stigmatica Ettl
