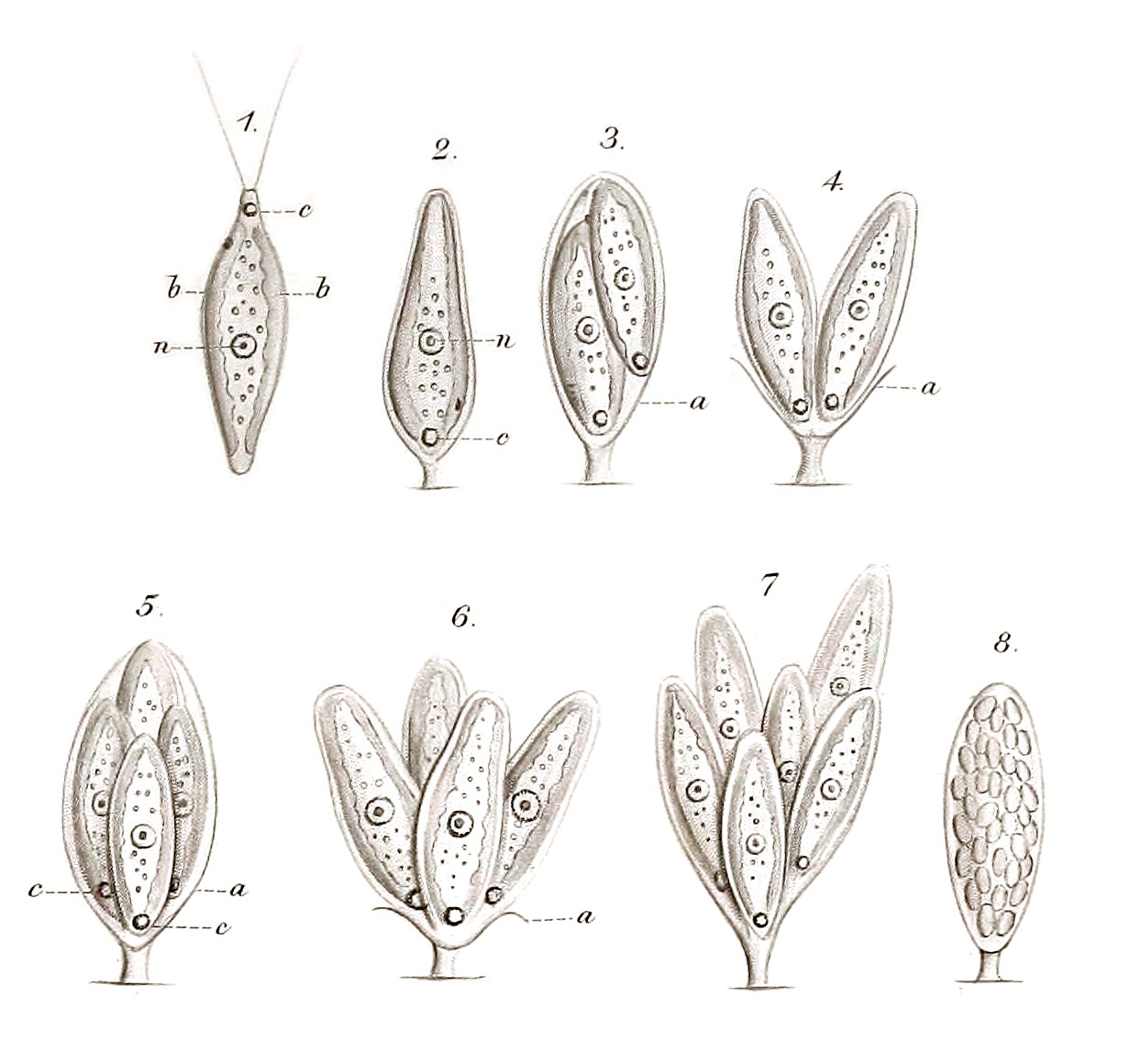
- Chlorangiella pygmaea

Scientific classification
- Clade: Viridiplantae
- Division: Chlorophyta
- Class: Chlorophyceae
- Order: Chlamydomonadales
- Family: Chlorangiellaceae; Bourrelly ex Fott

Genera
- Cecidochloris; Chlamydomonadopsis; Chlorangiella; Chlorangiochloris; Chlorangiopsis; Malleochloris; Metapolytoma; Physocytium; Pseudochlorangium; Stylosphaeridiella; Stylosphaeridium

= Chlorangiellaceae =

Family of algae

Chlorangiellaceae is a green algae family in the order Chlamydomonadales.

The Chlorangiellaceae consists of solitary or colonial organisms, attached to a substrate. Cells may be embedded in gelatinous cell wall sheaths, or with no gelatinous mass and instead attached to the substrate via stalks, pads, or threads. Reproduction occurs via zoospores or gametes.

Organisms in Chlorangiellaceae are typically epibiontic on plankton, rarely tychoplanktonic.
