= Protosiphonaceae =

Scientific classification
- Kingdom: Plantae
- Division: Chlorophyta
- Class: Chlorophyceae
- Order: Chlamydomonadales
- Family: Protosiphonaceae; Blackman & Tansley

Genera
- See text.

Family of algae

Protosiphonaceae is a family of chlorophyte green algae, in the order Chlamydomonadales.

== Genera ==
As of February 2022, AlgaeBase accepted the following genera:

- Protosiphon Klebs – 2 species
- Spongiosarcinopsis A.Temraleeva, S.Moskalenko, E.Mincheva, Y.Bukin & M.Sinetova – 1 species
- Urnella Playfair – 1 species
