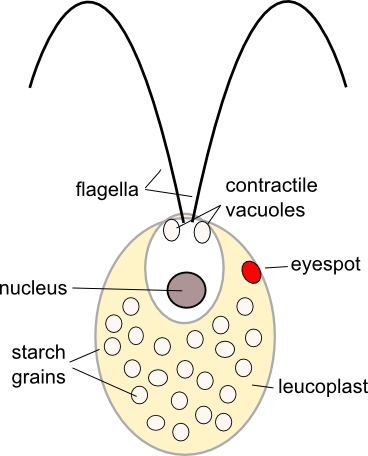

Scientific classification
- Kingdom: Plantae
- Division: Chlorophyta
- Class: Chlorophyceae
- Order: Chlamydomonadales
- Family: Chlamydomonadaceae
- Genus: Polytoma; Ehrenberg

Type species
- Polytoma uvella Ehrenberg

Species
- P. anomale; P. difficile; P. ellipticum; P. mirum; P. obtusum; P. oviforme; P. uvella; P. sp. strain ATCC 30963; P. sp. strain SAG 195.80; P. sp. strain SAG 62-20

= Polytoma =

Genus of algae

Polytoma is a genus of flagellates in the family Chlamydomonadaceae. Algae are similar to the genus Chlamydomonas, but lack chlorophyll and are colorless. Although they are not photosynthetic, they are grouped with the green algae because they are phylogenetically related to, and derived from, flagellate green algae.

Polytoma species are found in waters rich in organic matter.

== Description ==
Polytoma is a genus of colorless, free-living chlorophytes similar in form to Chlamydomonas but lacking chlorophyll. Two flagella emanate from the anterior papilla of the cell, and cells have two contractile vacuoles at the flagellar base. The cell body can be spherical, ellipsoid, ovoid, or kidney-shaped. Polytoma possesses a leukoplast in place of a chloroplast, in which many starch grains are concentrated; there are typically no pyrenoids. Since they lack photosynthetic capability, Polytoma species are entirely saprotrophic, obtaining nutrients from decaying organic matter. Some species possess an eyespot apparatus (stigma) in the anterior portion of the leucoplast, but in others this organelle is absent.

Asexual reproduction occurs when the parent cell divides into four zoospores, while in the parent cell wall. Sexual reproduction can be isogamous, anisogamous, or oogamous.

== Phylogeny ==
As currently circumscribed, the genus Polytoma is polyphyletic, with its members grouping into two clades.
