= Wislouchia =

Scientific classification
- Clade: Viridiplantae
- Division: Chlorophyta
- Class: Chlorophyceae
- Order: Chlamydomonadales
- Family: Wislouchiaceae
- Genus: Wislouchia; Molinari & Guiry

Species
- Wislouchia salina (Wisłouch) Molinari & Guiry; Wislouchia uroglenoidea (Svirenko) Molinari & Guiry

Synonyms
- Raciborskiella Wisłouch, nom. illeg.

Genus of algae

Wislouchia is a genus of chlorophyte green algae. The name was first published in 2021, as a replacement name for Raciborskiella. As of February 2022, it was the only genus in the family Wislouchiaceae.

The genus synonym name of Raciborskiella was in honour of Marjan (Mariyan) Raciborski (1863-1917), who was a Polish botanist (Mycology, Algology and Bryology), plant collector and Palaeontologist, Professor of Botany at Lemberg University (Ukraine) in 1909. It was named by botanist Stanislav Michailovic Wislouch (1875-1927), who the new genus is named after.

Wislouchia contains two species found in fresh or brackish water.

== Description ==
Wislouchia consists of colonies of 2–16 cells, which are ovoid and radially arranged with their narrow posterior ends attached to each other. Cells have two flagella and lack cellulosic cell walls. The chloroplast is single, parietal and contains a basal pyrenoid. The anterior of the cell has a narrow eyespot. Contractile vacuoles are lacking.

Asexual reproduction occurs by the longitudinal division of cells, which increase the number of cells in a colony. These cells may be released from the colony and thereby form new colonies. Sexual reproduction is isogamous.
