= Asteromonadaceae =

Scientific classification
- Kingdom: Plantae
- Division: Chlorophyta
- Class: Chlorophyceae
- Order: Chlamydomonadales
- Family: Asteromonadaceae; Péterfi

Genera
- Asteromonas; Pseudostephanoptera; Tetraptera; Tetrapteromonas; Triptera

Family of algae

Asteromonadaceae are a family of algae in the order Chlamydomonadales.

Asteromonadaceae consists of cells that are angular in cross section, with longitudinal ribs. Cells have two or four flagella. They are mostly found in marine or saline habitats, with a few freshwater representatives.

Formerly, genera such as Aulacomonas and Collodictyon have been placed in this family. However, these have been placed in their own family that is phylogenetically very distant from other flagellate groups.
