= Actinochloris =

Scientific classification
- Clade: Viridiplantae
- Division: Chlorophyta
- Class: Chlorophyceae
- Order: Chlamydomonadales
- Family: Actinochloridaceae
- Genus: Actinochloris; Korshikov, 1953
- Species: A. sphaerica

Binomial name
- Actinochloris sphaerica Korschikov, 1953

Genus of algae

Actinochloris is a genus of green algae, in the family Actinochloridaceae, with a single species Actinochloris sphaerica. It is a subaerial to terrestrial alga.

Actinochloris consists of solitary cells. They are initially broadly ellipsoid to ovoid but always spherical when mature, and up to 85 μm in diameter. The cell wall is smooth and firm, and is thick in mature cells. Cells contain a single large chloroplast with many lobes; there is a large thick central piece containing a single large pyrenoid. From the pyrenoid, there are many irregularly arranged lobes that branch out to the periphery of the cell.
