= Actinochloridaceae =

Scientific classification
- Kingdom: Plantae
- Division: Chlorophyta
- Class: Chlorophyceae
- Order: Chlamydomonadales
- Family: Actinochloridaceae; Korshikov, 1953

Genera
- See text.

Family of algae

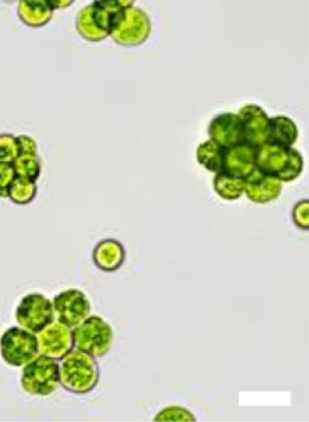
Deasonia sp. NAMSU 934/2, light microscopy.

Actinochloridaceae is a family of green algae, in the order Chlamydomonadales.

Actinochloridaceae consists of solitary, spherical cells. The family is characterized by their chloroplasts, which are typically strongly lobed and dissected, or sometimes broken up into many pieces. In all genera except for one, chloroplasts contain one or more pyrenoids. Adult cells are multinucleate, continuously adding more nuclei as the cell develops. Asexual reproduction occurs when the protoplast of the cell divides into multiple biflagellate zoospores, or less commonly, aplanospores or autospores. Reports of sexual reproduction have not been confirmed.

== Genera ==
As of February 2022, AlgaeBase accepted four genera:

- Actinochloris Korschikov – 1 species
- Deasonia H.Ettl & J.Komárek – 6 species
- Macrochloris Korshikov – 6 species
- Pseudodictyochloris Vinatzer – 2 species
