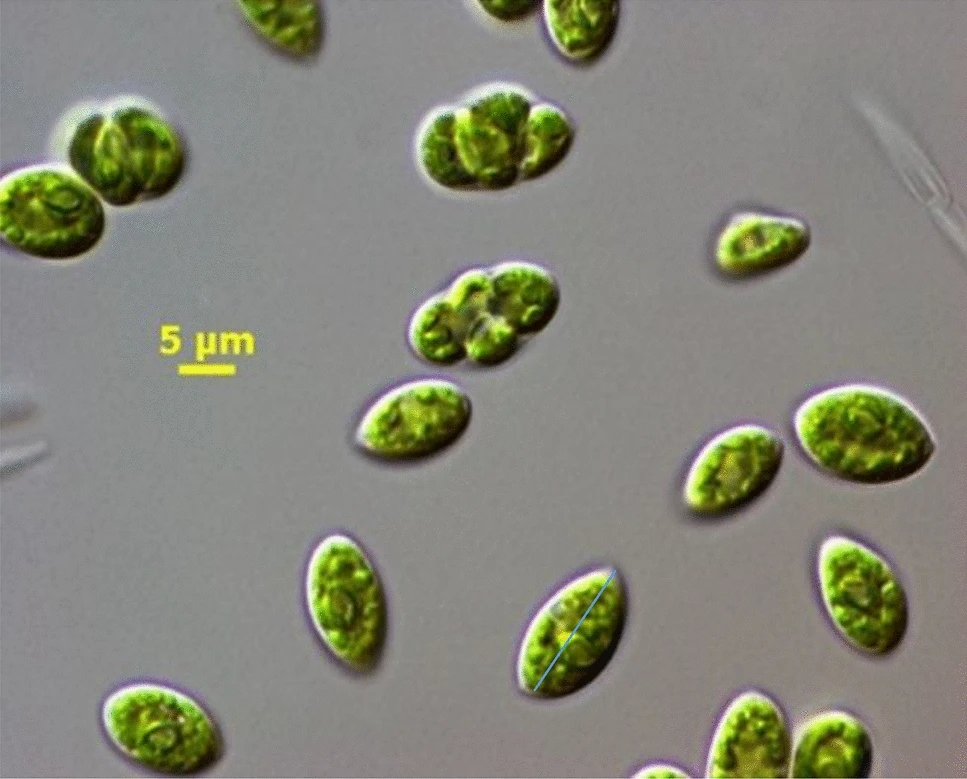
- Chlamydopodium fusiforme

Scientific classification
- Kingdom: Plantae
- Division: Chlorophyta
- Class: Chlorophyceae
- Order: Chlamydomonadales
- Family: Characiochloridaceae; Skuja

Genera
- Characiochloris; Chlamydopodium; Metapolytoma; Physocytium

= Characiochloridaceae =

Family of algae

Characiochloridaceae is a family of green algae in the order Chlamydomonadales.

Characiochloridaceae consists of solitary or rarely clustered cells, attached to a substrate via a stalk or other adhesive organ. Cells are heteropolar, ranging from egg-shaped to spindle- or pear-shaped, but also sometimes spherical. The adhesive part of the cell may be colored brown from iron compounds. The cell contains a single parietal chloroplast, which may be cup-shaped and variously lobed and dissected. Chloroplasts have at least one pyrenoid surrounded by a layer of starch. Vegetative cells are uninucleate, i.e. with one nucleus. Asexual reproduction occurs when the protoplast successively divides into 2-64 zoospores, each with two flagella. Less often, aplanospores or autospores are formed. Sexual reproduction has been observed, but is rare.

The taxonomy of Characiochloridaceae is in need of revision, as phylogenetic studies using rDNA have shown that it is not monophyletic. The type genus, Characiochloris, is closely related to genera in the family Characiosiphonaceae.
