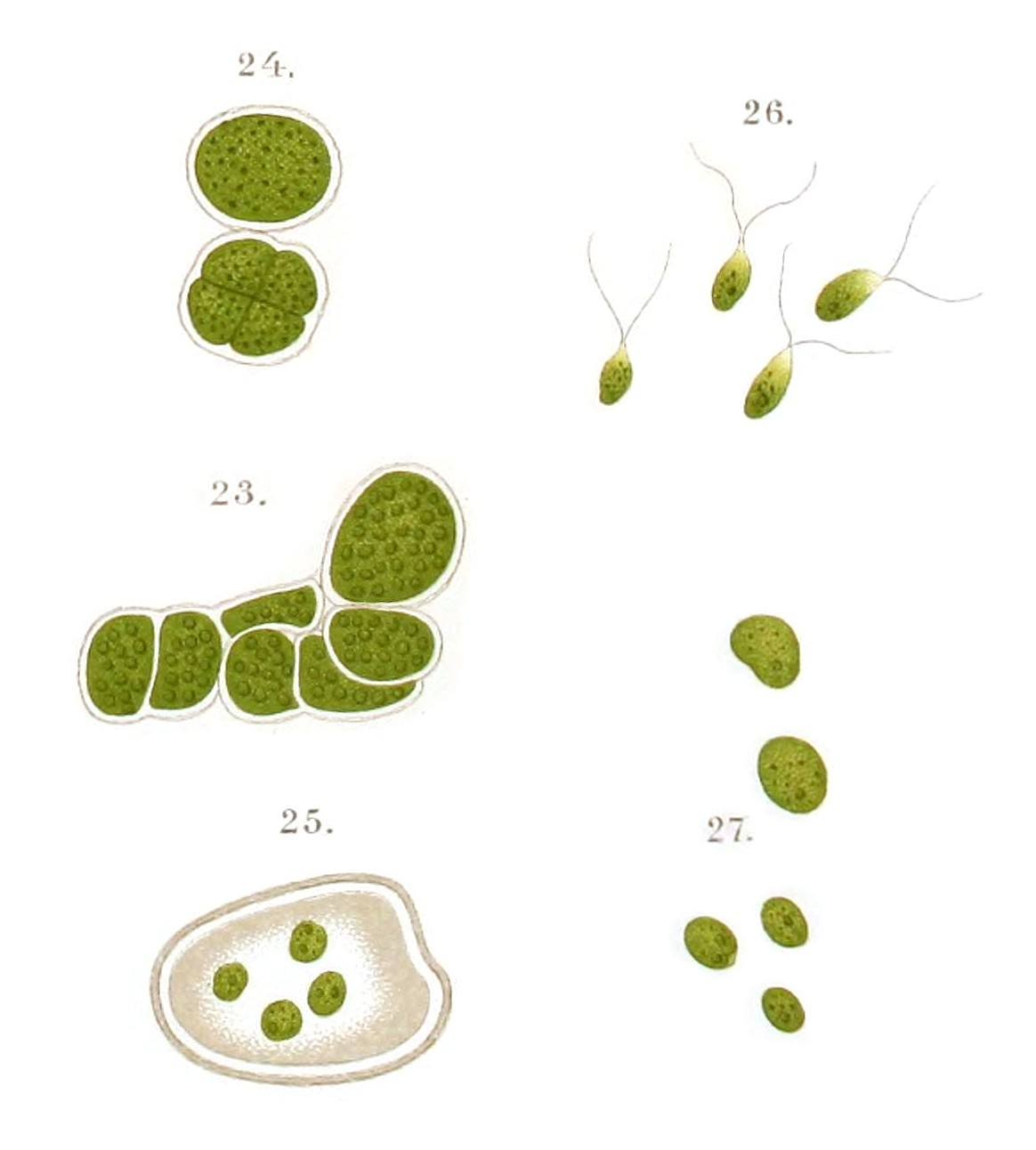
- Chlorosarcina consociata

Scientific classification
- Kingdom: Plantae
- Division: Chlorophyta
- Class: Chlorophyceae
- Order: Chlamydomonadales
- Family: Chlorosarcinaceae; Bourrelly ex Groover & Bold

Genera
- See text.

Synonyms
- Chlorosphaeraceae Herndon; Chlorosarcinoideae Komárek & Fott

= Chlorosarcinaceae =

Family of algae

Chlorosarcinaceae is a family of chlorophyte green algae, in the order Chlamydomonadales. Members of this genus are found in soils.

Members of the family Chlorosarcinaceae usually occur as irregular packet-shaped colonies, rarely singly. Cells are spherical to irregular, particularly flattened at the walls when in contact with neighboring cells. The chloroplast is varied in morphology; it may be parietal and cup- or mantle-shaped, or centrally located and irregular or reticulate. Pyrenoids are present in most genera. Reproduction occurs via cell division, and via the formation of zoospores.

As currently defined, the family is a polyphyletic and thus artificial assemblage of different genera. Phylogenetic analyses have placed the genera as sister to various taxa within the Chlamydomonadales. The type species of the type genus, Chlorosarcina elegans, is not available in culture.

== Genera ==
As of February 2022, AlgaeBase accepted the following genera:

- Borodinella V.V.Miller – 1 species
- Chlorosarcina Gerneck – 6 species
- Chlorosarcinopsis Herndon – 12 species
- Chlorosphaera Klebs – 1 species
- Chlorosphaeropsis Vischer – 3 species
- Desmotetra T.R.Deason & G.L.Floyd – 4 species
- Entophysa M.Möbius – 1 species
- Neochlorosarcina Shin Watanabe – 7 species
- Pleurastrosarcina H.J.Sluiman & P.C.J.Blommers – 1 species
- Polysphaera Reisigl – 1 species
- Possonia F.Hindak – 1 species
- Pseudotetracystis R.D.Arneson – 3 species
- Sarcinochlamys Shin Watanabe – 1 species
- Symbiococcum M.Rahat & V.Reich – 1 species
