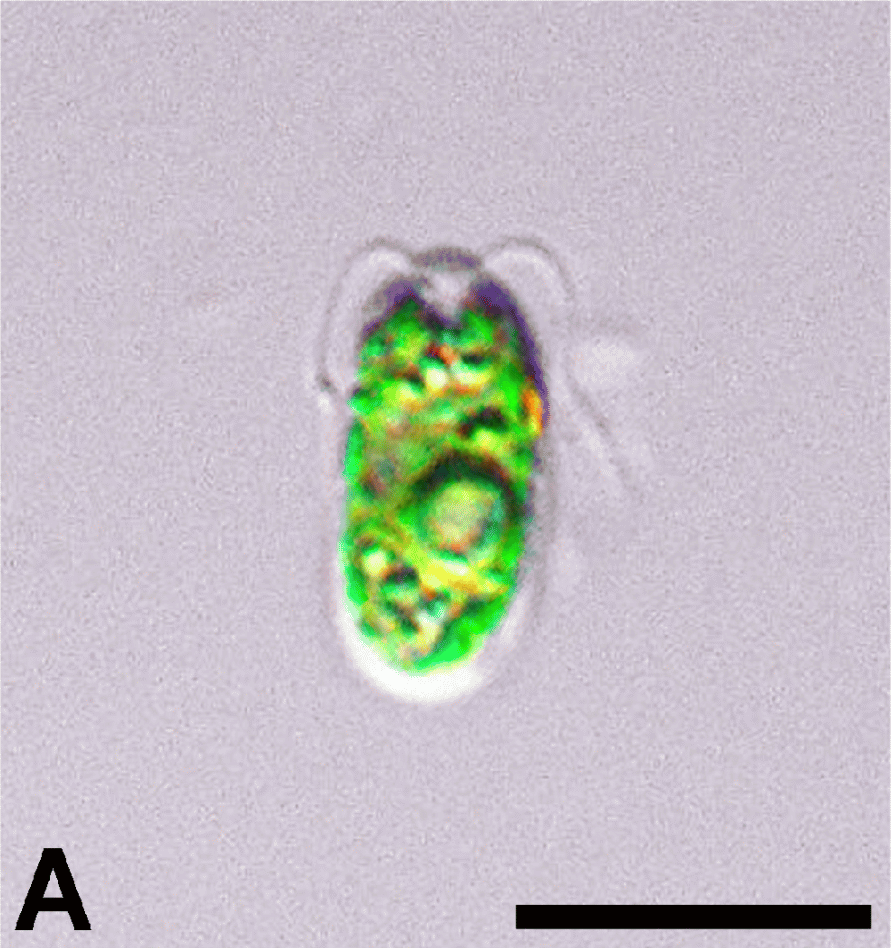
- Oogamochlamys kurilensis

Scientific classification
- Kingdom: Plantae
- Division: Chlorophyta
- Class: Chlorophyceae
- Order: Chlamydomonadales
- Family: Chlamydomonadaceae
- Genus: Oogamochlamys; Pröschold, B.Marin, U.W.Schlösser & Melkonian

Type species
- Oogamochlamys gigantea (O.Dill) Pröschold, B.Marin, U.W.Schlösser & Melkonian

Species
- Oogamochlamys ettlii; Oogamochlamys gigantea; Oogamochlamys zimbabwiensis

= Oogamochlamys =

Genus of algae

Oogamochlamys is a genus of green algae in the family Chlamydomonadaceae.
