= Pseudocarteria =

Scientific classification
- Kingdom: Plantae
- Division: Chlorophyta
- Class: Chlorophyceae
- Order: Chlamydomonadales
- Family: Chlamydomonadaceae
- Genus: Pseudocarteria; H.Ettl

Species
- Pseudocarteria mucosa

Genus of algae

Pseudocarteria is a genus of green algae in the family Chlamydomonadaceae.
