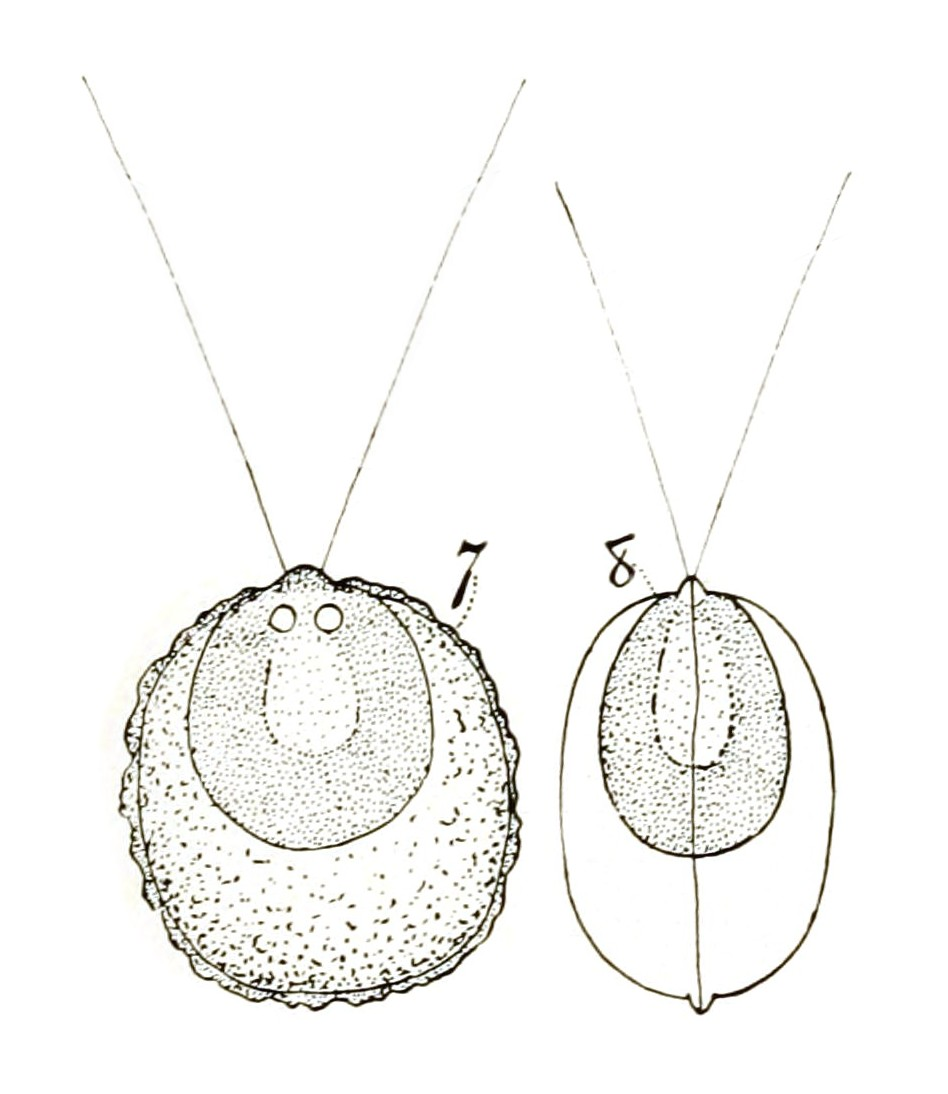
- Phacotus crassus

Scientific classification
- Kingdom: Plantae
- Division: Chlorophyta
- Class: Chlorophyceae
- Order: Chlamydomonadales
- Family: Phacotaceae; Francé

Genera
- Arnoldiamonas; Cephalomonas; Chlamydoblepharis; Coccomonas; Delphinomonas; Dysmorphococcus; Fortiella; Fortiellopsis M.O.P.Iyengar; Granulochloris; Hemitoma; Iyengariomonas; Melomonas; Pedinopera; Pedinoperopsis; Phacotus; Pteromonas; Pyramidococcus; Thoracomonas; Tingitanella; Wislouchiella

= Phacotaceae =

Family of algae

Phacotaceae is a family of green algae in the order Chlamydomonadales. Members of this family are found in freshwater habitats worldwide.

Phacotaceae includes single-celled, mostly green organisms (one genus, Chlamydoblepharis), has lost its ability to photosynthesize and is colorless). Cells are motile with two or four flagella. Cells are surrounded by a cell wall (also termed a lorica), which may be smooth, scrobiculate (with shallow pits) or with various patterning or outgrowths. The cell wall may fit the protoplast, or protrude widely; it consists of one piece or two watch glass-like pieces with their edges joining. The cell wall is often colored yellowish to dark brown due to the presence of iron, manganese or calcium deposits. The cell wall has one, two or four openings at the anterior, from which the flagella emerge together or separately.

Asexual reproduction occurs by the division of cells into zoospores; these develop within the parental cell lorica and are released through a crack in the old lorica, or the two halves separating. Sexual reproduction is isogamy or anisogamous. Resting stages have been observed rarely.

Phacotaceae as a family is characterized by its cells, which are similar in morphology to Chlamydomonas but surrounded by a lorica. As currently circumscribed, it is polyphyletic, consisting of at least three clades. Members within each clade share some ultrastructural features, but the traditional classification has not yet been reconciled with their evolutionary relationships.
