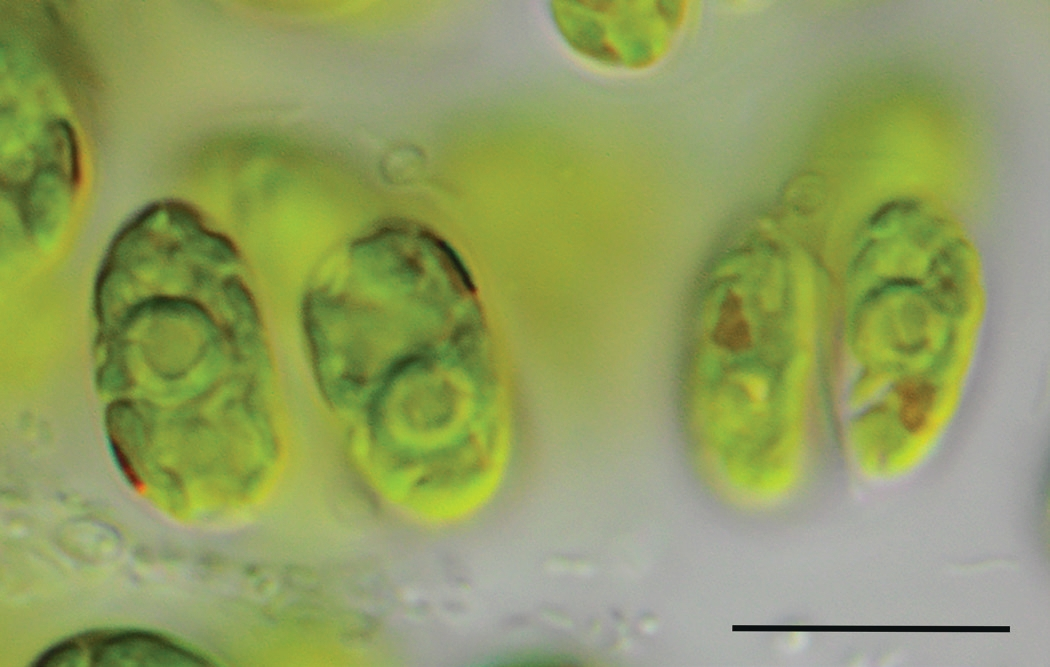
- Lobochlamys culleus

Scientific classification
- Kingdom: Plantae
- Division: Chlorophyta
- Class: Chlorophyceae
- Order: Chlamydomonadales
- Family: Chlamydomonadaceae
- Genus: Lobochlamys; T.Pröschold, B.Marin, U.W.Schlösser & M.Melkonian

Species
- Lobochlamys culleus; Lobochlamys segnis

= Lobochlamys =

Genus of algae

Lobochlamys is a genus of green algae in the family Chlamydomonadaceae.
