= Pseudociliate =

Pseudociliate refers to a type of cells which are covered by small coordinated flagella (cilia), but are not related to the Harosan group called the Ciliophora.
