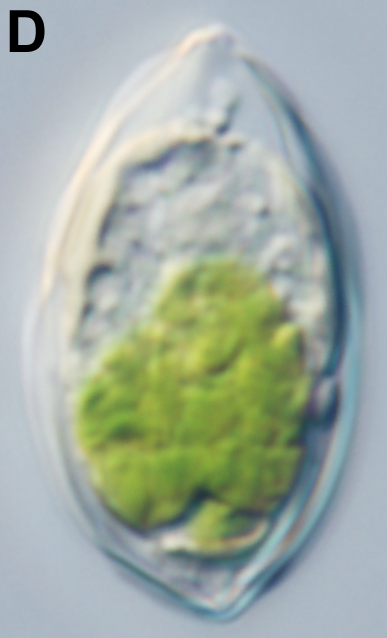
- Chloromonas miwae

Scientific classification
- Kingdom: Plantae
- Division: Chlorophyta
- Class: Chlorophyceae
- Order: Chlamydomonadales
- Family: Chlamydomonadaceae
- Genus: Chloromonas; Gobi

Type species
- Chloromonas reticulata (Goroschankin) Gobi

Species
- See text

= Chloromonas =

Genus of algae

Chloromonas is a genus of green algae in the family Chlamydomonadaceae. It is closely related to the model green algae, Chlamydomonas, and traditionally has been distinguished mainly through the absence of a pyrenoid.

Species of Chloromonas occupy a variety of habitats, including soil, temporary pools of fresh water and eutrophic lakes. A number of species are adapted to living on snow, making them snow algae. The most northerly location at which this algae has been observed is Lake Bienville, Quebec, 55°N.

== Description ==
Chloromonas is a unicellular organism with cells that are ranging from spherical, ovoid, cylindrical, or spindle-shaped. There are two equal flagella on the anterior end of the cell, with or without a papilla. As single large chloroplast fills the cell, and may be cup-shaped and variously lobed. Chloroplasts lack pyrenoids. An eyespot is present in most species. There is a single nucleus typically embedded in the center of the cell.

Reproduction in Chloromonas occurs asexually and sexually. Asexual reproduction is by cell division, forming two or four zoospores. Sexual reproduction in the genus is diverse and can be isogamous, anisogamous, or oogamous.

== Taxonomy ==
Traditionally, the genus Chloromonas has been defined morphologically as being a pyrenoid-less version of Chlamydomonas. Phylogenetically, the pyrenoid-less species are all found in a single clade, but there are also pyrenoid-bearing species within this clade, making the genus non-monophyletic. In 2001, as a first step towards revising the genus, Thomas Pröschold and colleagues emended the circumscription of Chloromonas to include all species of this clade. However, this clade also includes species of Gloeomonas, and the name Gloeomonas has priority over Chloromonas.

== Species ==
- C. radiata
- C. asteroidea
- C. macrostellata
- C. reticulata
- C. oogama
- C. perforata
- C. rosae
- C. serbinowi
- C. sp. ANT3
- C. sp. ANT1
- C. insignis
- C. augustae
- C. palmelloides
- C. playfairii
- C. actinochloris
- C. carrizoensis
- C. rubrifilum
- C. sp. D-CU581C
- C. brevispina
- C. nivalis
- C. paraserbinowii
- C. pichinchae
- C. subdivisa
- C. variabilis
- C. rostafinskii
- C. cf. alpina 032-99
- C. cf. platystigma 020-99
- C. sp. 047-99
- C. cf. palatina 025-99
- C. chenangoensis
- C. sp. CU722a
