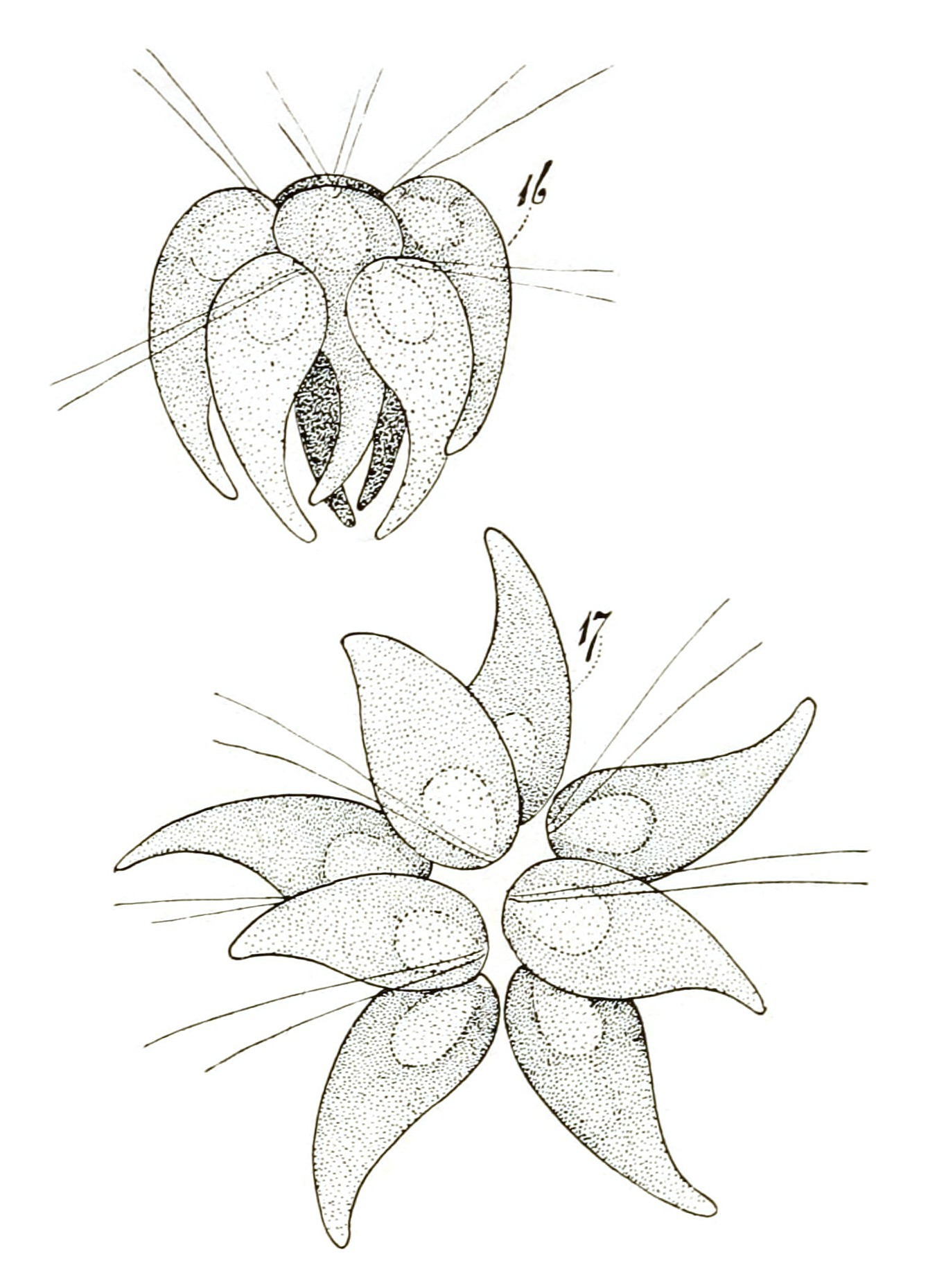
- Pyrobotrys rostratus

Scientific classification
- Kingdom: Plantae
- Division: Chlorophyta
- Class: Chlorophyceae
- Order: Chlamydomonadales
- Family: Spondylomoraceae; Korshikov

Genera
- Chlamydosphaera; Chlorcorona; Pascherina; Pyrobotrys; Spondylomorum; Uva

= Spondylomoraceae =

Family of algae

Spondylomoraceae is a family of algae in the order Chlamydomonadales. It consists of various freshwater, microscopic algae.

Members of the Spondylomoraceae are coenobial flagellate organisms with the overall form typically resembling a mulberry. It consists of multiple rings of cells stacked upon each other. Rings consist of two or four cells, connected to each other by long gelatinous strands, with cells of each ring alternating. Individual cells are similar in morphology to Chlamydomonas, with chloroplasts and pyrenoids, but may be slightly deformed due to contact with adjacent cells. Cells have two or four flagella. Individual cells may sometimes detach from the rest of the colony. Asexual reproduction occurs by the formation of autocoenobia within existing cells. Sexual reproduction is isogamous, forming quadriflagellate planozygotes.
