= Contractile vacuole =

Organelle used in regulating osmosis

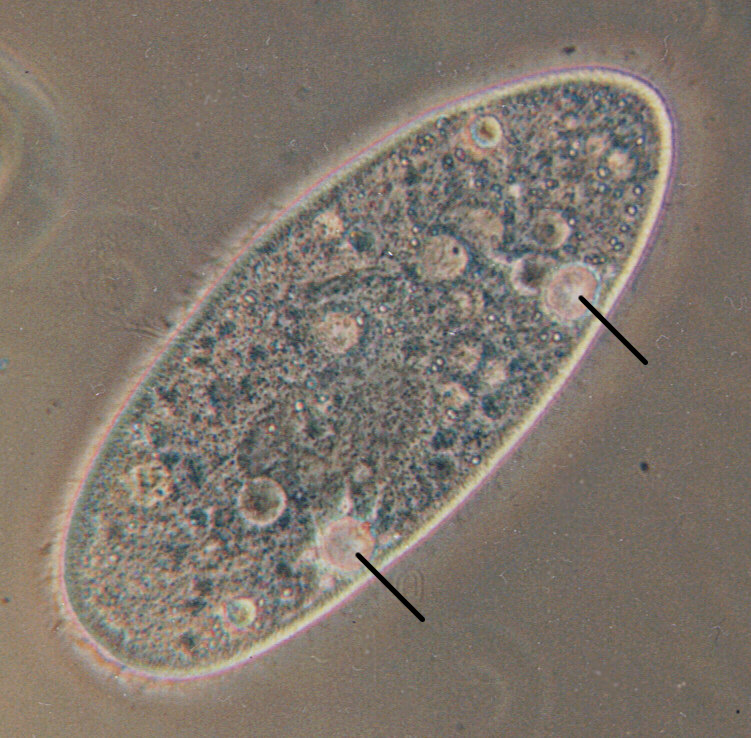
Protist Paramecium aurelia with contractile vacuoles

A contractile vacuole (CV) is a sub-cellular structure (organelle) involved in osmoregulation. It is found predominantly in protists, including unicellular algae. It was previously known as pulsatile or pulsating vacuole.

== Overview ==
The contractile vacuole is a specialized type of vacuole that regulates the quantity of water inside a cell. In freshwater environments, the concentration of solutes is hypotonic, lower outside than inside the cell. Under these conditions, osmosis causes water to accumulate in the cell from the external environment. The contractile vacuole acts as part of a protective mechanism that prevents the cell from absorbing too much water and possibly lysing (rupturing) through excessive internal pressure.

The contractile vacuole, as its name suggests, expels water out of the cell by contracting. The growth (water gathering) and contraction (water expulsion) of the contractile vacuole are periodical. One cycle takes several seconds, depending on the species and the osmolarity of the environment. The stage in which water flows into the CV is called diastole. The contraction of the contractile vacuole and the expulsion of water out of the cell is called systole.

Water always flows first from outside the cell into the cytoplasm, and is only then moved from the cytoplasm into the contractile vacuole for expulsion. Species that possess a contractile vacuole typically always use the organelle, even at very hypertonic (high concentration of solutes) environments, since the cell tends to adjust its cytoplasm to become even more hyperosmotic than the environment. The amount of water expelled from the cell and the rate of contraction are related to the osmolarity of the environment. In hyperosmotic environments, less water will be expelled and the contraction cycle will be longer.

The best-understood contractile vacuoles belong to the protists Paramecium, Amoeba, Dictyostelium and Trypanosoma, and to a lesser extent the green alga Chlamydomonas. Not all species that possess a contractile vacuole are freshwater organisms; some marine, soil microorganisms and parasites also have a contractile vacuole. The contractile vacuole is predominant in species that do not have a cell wall, but there are exceptions (notably Chlamydomonas) which do possess a cell wall. Through evolution, the contractile vacuole has typically been lost in multicellular organisms, but it still exists in the unicellular stage of several multicellular fungi, as well as in several types of cells in sponges (amoebocytes, pinacocytes, and choanocytes).

The number of contractile vacuoles per cell varies, depending on the species. Amoeba have one, Dictyostelium discoideum, Paramecium aurelia and Chlamydomonas reinhardtii have two, and giant amoeba, such as Chaos carolinensis, have many. The number of contractile vacuoles in each species is mostly constant and is therefore used for species characterization in systematics. The contractile vacuole has several structures attached to it in most cells, such as membrane folds, tubules, water tracts and small vesicles. These structures have been termed the spongiome; the contractile vacuole together with the spongiome is sometimes called the "contractile vacuole complex" (CVC). The spongiome serves several functions in water transport into the contractile vacuole and in localization and docking of the contractile vacuole within the cell.

Paramecium and Amoeba possess large contractile vacuoles (average diameter of 13 and 45 μm, respectively), which are relatively comfortable to isolate, manipulate and assay. The smallest known contractile vacuoles belong to Chlamydomonas, with a diameter of 1.5 μm. In Paramecium, which has one of the most complex contractile vacuoles, the vacuole is surrounded by several canals, which absorb water by osmosis from the cytoplasm. After the canals fill with water, the water is pumped into the vacuole. When the vacuole is full, it expels the water through a pore in the cytoplasm which can be opened and closed. Other protists, such as Amoeba, have CVs that move to the surface of the cell when full and undergo exocytosis. In Amoeba contractile vacuoles collect excretory waste, such as ammonia, from the intracellular fluid by both diffusion and active transport.

== Water flow into the CV ==
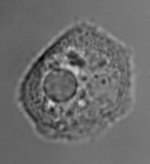
A Dictyostelium discoideum (slime mold) cell exhibiting a prominent contractile vacuole on its left side

The way in which water enters the CV had been a mystery for many years, but several discoveries since the 1990s have improved understanding of this issue. Water could theoretically cross the CV membrane by osmosis, but only if the inside of the CV is hyperosmotic (higher solute concentration) to the cytoplasm. The discovery of proton pumps in the CV membrane and the direct measurement of ion concentrations inside the CV using microelectrodes led to the following model: the pumping of protons either into or out of the CV causes different ions to enter the CV. For example, some proton pumps work as cation exchangers, whereby a proton is pumped out of the CV and a cation is pumped at the same time into the CV. In other cases, protons pumped into the CV drag anions with them (carbonate, for example), to balance the pH. This ion flux into the CV causes an increase in CV osmolarity and as a result water enters the CV by osmosis. Water has been shown in at least some species to enter the CV through aquaporins.

Acidocalcisomes have been implied to work alongside the contractile vacuole in responding to osmotic stress. They were detected in the vicinity of the vacuole in Trypanosoma cruzi and were shown to fuse with the vacuole when the cells were exposed to osmotic stress. Presumably the acidocalcisomes empty their ion contents into the contractile vacuole, thereby increasing the vacuole's osmolarity.
