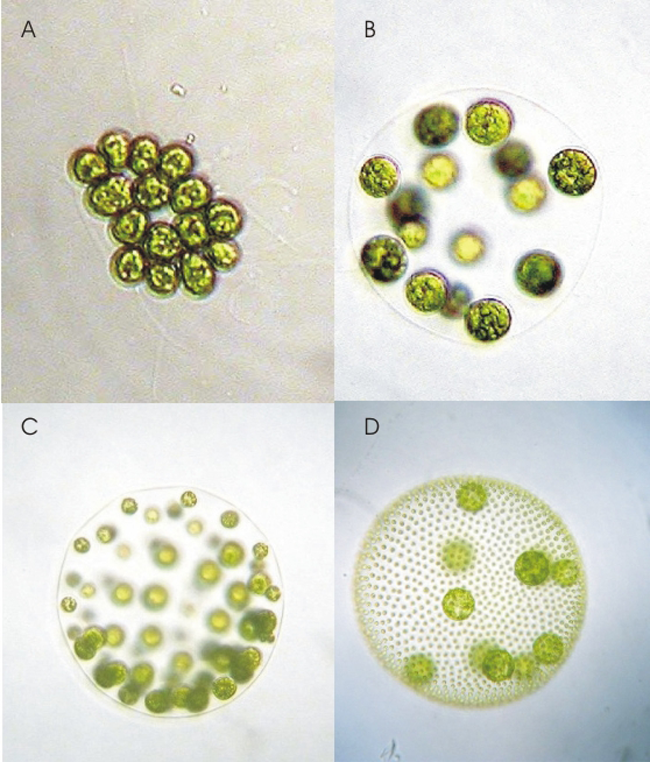
- (A) Gonium pectorale, (B) Eudorina elegans, (C) Pleodorina californica, and (D) Volvox carteri

Scientific classification
- Domain: Eukaryota
- Clade: Archaeplastida
- Clade: Viridiplantae
- Division: Chlorophyta
- Class: Chlorophyceae
- Order: Chlamydomonadales; Fritsch in West & Fritsch, 1927

Families
- See text.

Synonyms
- Volvocida Francé, 1894, orth. zool.; Phytomonadina Blochmann, 1895; Volvocales Oltmanns, 1904

= Chlamydomonadales =

Order of green algae

Chlamydomonadales, also known as Volvocales, are an order of flagellated or pseudociliated green algae, specifically of the Chlorophyceae. Chlamydomonadales can form planar or spherical colonies. These vary from Gonium (four to 32 cells) up to Volvox (500 cells or more). Each cell has two flagella, and is similar in appearance to Chlamydomonas, with the flagella throughout the colony moving in coordination.

Both asexual and sexual reproduction occur. In the former, cells divide until they form new colonies, which are then released. In the smaller forms, typically all cells are involved, but larger forms have anterior vegetative and posterior reproductive cells. Sexual reproduction varies from isogamy (both genders produce flagellated gametes of equal size) to oogamy (one gender produces a much larger, nonmotile gamete).

The classification of the Chlamydomonadales varies. Very often they are taken to include the orders Volvocales and Dunallielales, which contain closely related unicellular flagellates, as suborders. Colony inversion is believed to have arisen twice in this order. Spheroidal colony formation differs between the two lineages: rotation of daughter protoplasts during successive cell divisions in Astrephomene, and inversion after cell divisions in the Volvocaceae.

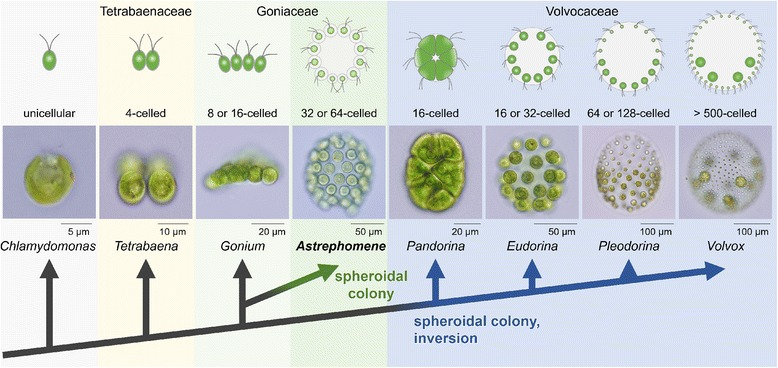
Schematic representation of the phylogenetic relationships of the volvocine algae and the parallel evolution of the spheroidal colony. Volvocine algae range from the unicellular Chlamydomonas to the multicellular Volvox through various intermediate forms and are used as a model for research into the evolution of multicellularity. The spheroidal colony is thought to have evolved twice independently within this group: once in the Volvocaceae, from Pandorina to Volvox, and the other in the genus Astrephomene. All drawings and photographs represent side views of individuals with anterior ends orienting toward the top of this figure. Note that the phylogeny has been revised in newer studies, placing Tetrabaena as sister to the rest of the group.

== Families ==
As of May 2023, AlgaeBase accepted the following families:

- Actinochloridaceae Korshikov
- Asteromonadaceae Péterfi
- Carteriaceae Pascher
- Characiochloridaceae Skuja
- Characiosiphonaceae Iyengar
- Chlamydomonadaceae F.Stein
- Chlorangiellaceae Bourrelly ex Fott
- Chlorochytriaceae Setchell & N.L.Gardner
- Chlorococcaceae Blackman & Tansley
- Chlorosarcinaceae Bourrelly ex Groover & Bold
- Dunaliellaceae T.A.Christensen
- Goniaceae (Pascher) Pascher
- Haematococcaceae G.M.Smith
- Hypnomonadaceae Korshikov
- Palmellaceae Decaisne
- Palmellopsidaceae Korshikov
- Phacotaceae Francé
- Pleurastraceae K.R.Mattox & K.D.Stewart
- Protosiphonaceae Blackman & Tansley
- Sphaerocystidaceae Fott ex Tsarenko
- Sphaerodictyaceae C.-C.Jao
- Spondylomoraceae Korshikov
- Tetrabaenaceae H.Nozaki & M.Ito
- Tetrasporaceae Wittrock
- Volvocaceae Ehrenberg
- Wislouchiaceae Molinari & Guiry

== Phylogeny ==
Traditionally, families and genera within Chlamydomonadales have been classified based on their morphology. However, molecular phylogenetic studies have shown that the evolutionary relationships do not correspond to the traditional taxonomic classifications. Despite this, the families and genera are still in use, because the differences have not been reconciled into a single, useful classification system.

In 2008, Nakada et al. defined a number of well-supported clades within Chlamydomonadales using PhyloCode. Their relationships, as well as a few representative genera and species, are shown below.

- - - - - - - Xenovolvoxa
              - - Moewusinia (Chlamydomonas moewusii, Chlorococcum infusionum)
                - Oviforminia (Chlamydomonas chlamydogama, Chlamydomonad sp.)
              - - Phacotinia (Phacotus, Pteromonas)
                - Monadinia (Microglena)
            - Caudivolvoxa
              - Characiosiphonia (Characiosiphon, Lobocharacium)
              - - - - Arenicolinia (Chlorosarcinopsis arenicola)
                    - Stephanosphaerinia (Stephanosphaera)
                  - Chlorogonia (Chlorogonium)
                - - Polytominia (Polytoma uvella)
                  - Dunaliellinia (Dunaliella)
          - - - Uncultured chlorophyte, Actinochloris sp.
              - Chloromonadinia (Chloromonas)
            - - Tatrensinia (Chlorococcum tatrense)
              - - Desmotetra
                - Reinhardtinia (Chlamydomonas reinhardtii, Volvocaceae)
            - Oogamochlamydinia (Oogamochlamys, Lobochlamys)
        - Treubarinia (Treubaria, Trochiscia, Cylindrocapsa)
        - - Radicarteria (Carteria pro parte)
          - Spermatozopsis similis
      - Hafniomonas
    - Crucicarteria (Carteria pro parte)
  - Golenkinia
