= List of Chlorophyceae genera =

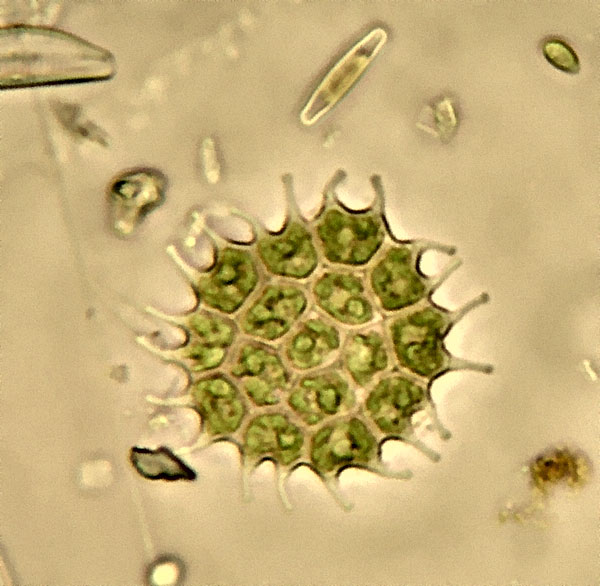
An example of Chlorophyceae genus Pediastrum.

The Chlorophyceae are a class of green algae, distinguished mainly on the basis of ultrastructural morphology. They are usually green due to the dominance of pigments chlorophyll a and chlorophyll b. The chloroplast may be discoid, plate-like, reticulate, cup-shaped, spiral- or ribbon-shaped, depending on the species. Most of the members have one or more storage bodies called pyrenoids located in the chloroplast. Pyrenoids contain protein besides starch. Some algae may store food in the form of oil droplets. Green algae usually have a rigid cell wall made up of an inner layer of cellulose and outer layer of pectose.

This list of genera in Chlorophyceae is sub-divided by order and family. Some genera have uncertain taxonomic placement and are listed as incertae sedis. The list is based on the data available in AlgaeBase, the Integrated Taxonomic Information System (ITIS) and other taxonomic databases.

== Order Chaetopeltidales ==
- Family Chaetopeltidaceae
  - Chaetopeltis
  - Floydiella
  - Gormaniella
  - Hormotilopsis
  - Koshicola
  - Oncosaccus
  - Phyllogloea
  - Pseudulvella
- Family Dicranochaetaceae
  - Dicranochaete
- Family Hydrocytiaceae
  - Hydrocytium

== Order Chaetophorales ==
- Family Aphanochaetaceae
  - Aphanochaete
  - Chaetonema
  - Micropoa
  - Thamniochaete
- Family Barrancaceae
  - Barranca
- Family Chaetophoraceae
  - Arthrochaete
  - Caespitella
  - Cedercreutziella
  - Chaetomnion
  - Chaetonemopsis
  - Chaetophora
  - Chaetophoropsis
  - Chloroclonium
  - Chlorotylium
  - Choreoclonium
  - Crenacantha
  - Diaphragma
  - Didymosporangium
  - Draparnaldia
  - Draparnaldioides
  - Elaterodiscus
  - Endoclonium
  - Endophyton
  - Entodictyon
  - Epibolium
  - Gloeoplax
  - Gongrosira
  - Gongrosirella
  - Hormotila
  - †Hydraeophycus
  - Ireksokonia
  - Iwanoffia
  - Jaagiella
  - Klebahniella
  - Kymatotrichon
  - Leptosiropsis
  - Lochmiopsis
  - Myxonemopsis
  - Nayalia
  - Periplegmatium
  - Pilinella
  - Pleurangium
  - Pleurococcus
  - Pseudochaete
  - Skvortzoviothrix
  - Sporocladopsis
  - Stereococcus
  - Streptochlora
  - Thamniochloris
  - Thamniolum
  - Trichodiscus
  - Tumulofilum
  - Uvulifera
  - Zoddaea
- Family Fritschiellaceae
  - Fritschiella
  - Stigeoclonium
- Family Schizomeridaceae
  - Schizomeris
- Family Uronemataceae
  - Uronema

== Order Chlamydomonadales ==
- Family Actinochloridaceae
  - Actinochloris
  - Deasonia
  - Macrochloris
  - Pseudodictyochloris
- Family Asteromonadaceae
  - Asteromonas
  - Tetrapteromonas
- Family Characiochloridaceae
  - Characiochloris
  - Chlamydopodium
  - Metapolytoma
  - Physocytium
- Family Characiosiphonaceae
  - Characiosiphon
  - Lobocharacium
- Family Chlamydomonadaceae
  - Agloe
  - Akiyamae
  - Brachiomonas
  - Carteria
  - Chlainomonas
  - Chlamydomonas
  - †Chlamydomonopsis
  - Chlamydonephris
  - Chlorobrachis
  - Chloroceras
  - Chlorominima
  - Chloromonas
  - Chlorotriangulum
  - †Circulimorpha
  - Corbierea
  - Cornumonas
  - Costatochloris
  - Cylindromonas
  - Dangeardinia
  - Diplostauron
  - Furcilla
  - Gigantochloris
  - Gloeomonas
  - Halosarcinochlamys
  - Heterochlamydomonas
  - Hiroseia
  - Hirtusochloris
  - Hyalobrachion
  - Ixipapillifera
  - Lobochlamys
  - Lobomonas
  - Microglena
  - Oltmannsiella
  - Oogamochlamys
  - Parapolytoma
  - Peterfiella
  - Phyllariochloris
  - Polytoma
  - Provasoliella
  - Pseudocarteria
  - Pseudofurcilla
  - Pyramichlamys
  - Rhysamphichloris
  - Sanguina
  - Selenochloris
  - Smithsonimonas
  - Sphaerella
  - Sphaerellopsis
  - Sphenochloris
  - Spirogonium
  - Staurocarteria
  - Tetrablepharis
  - Tetratoma
  - Tsumuraia
  - Tussetia
  - Vitreochlamys
- Family Chlorangiellaceae
  - Cecidochloris
  - Chlamydomonadopsis
  - Chlorangiella
  - Chlorangiochloris
  - Chlorangiopsis
  - Chlorophysema
  - Malleochloris
  - Pseudochlorangium
  - Stylosphaeridiella
  - Stylosphaeridium
  - Tetracladus
- Family Chlorochytriaceae
  - Burkillia
  - Chlorochytrium
  - Phyllobium
  - Rhodochytrium
- Family Chlorococcaceae
  - Apodochloris
  - Athroocystis
  - Borodinellopsis
  - Capsochloris
  - Chloracervus
  - Chlorococcopsis
  - Chlorococcum
  - Chlorohippotes
  - Cystomonas
  - Emergococcus
  - Emergosphaera
  - Eubrownia
  - Fasciculochloris
  - Ferricystis
  - Kentrosphaeropsis
  - Lautosphaeria
  - †Leiosphaeridia
  - Nautococcus
  - Neglectellopsis
  - Neospongiococcum
  - Octogoniella
  - Oophila
  - Phaseolaria
  - Pseudodictyococcus
  - Pseudoplanophila
  - Pseudospongiococcum
  - Pseudotrochiscia
  - Radiosphaera
  - Skujaster
  - Spongiochloris
  - Spongiococcum
  - †Syndesmorion
  - Tetracystis
  - †Torgia
  - Ulotrichella
  - Valeriella
  - Valkanoviella
  - †Xenosphaera
- Family Chlorosarcinaceae
  - Borodinella
  - Chlorosarcina
  - Chlorosarcinopsis
  - Chlorosphaera
  - Chlorosphaeropsis
  - Desmotetra
  - Entophysa
  - †Globochaete
  - †Latisphaera
  - †Maculosphaera
  - Neochlorosarcina
  - Pleurastrosarcina
  - Polysphaera
  - Possonia
  - Pseudotetracystis
  - Sarcinochlamys
  - Symbiococcum
- Family Dunaliellaceae
  - †Archaeodunaliella
  - Chloronephris
  - Dunaliella
  - Hafniomonas
  - Hyaliella
  - Hyalocardium
  - Medusochloris
  - Papenfussiomonas
  - Phyllocardium
  - Platella
  - Polytomella
  - Quadrichloris
  - Silvamonas
  - Spermatozopsis
  - Ulochloris
- Family Goniaceae
  - Astrephomene
  - Gonium
- Family Haematococcaceae
  - Balticola
  - Chlorogonium
  - Gungnir
  - Haematococcus
  - Hyalogonium
  - Rusalka
  - Stephanosphaera
- Family Hypnomonadaceae
  - Hypnomonas
  - Kremastochloris
  - Nautococcopsis
- Family †Lageniastraceae
  - †Lageniastrum
- Family Palmellaceae
  - Chlamydocystis
  - Chloranomala
  - †Cumulosphaera
  - Dendrodictyon
  - Ecballocystella
  - Ecballodictyon
  - Gloiodictyon
  - Gyorffyana
  - Hauckia
  - Heleococcus
  - Hormotilopsis
  - Inoderma
  - Palmella
  - Palmellosphaerium
  - Urococcus
- Family Palmellopsidaceae
  - Apiococcus
  - Asterococcus
  - Chlamydocapsa
  - Gloeococcus
  - Nautocapsa
  - Palmellopsis
  - Ploeotila
  - Pseudosphaerocystis
  - Pseudotetraspora
  - Schizodictyon
  - Sphaerellocystis
  - Tetrasporidium
- Family Phacotaceae
  - Arnoldiamonas
  - Cephalomonas
  - Chlamydoblepharis
  - Coccomonas
  - Delphinomonas
  - Dysmorphococcus
  - Fortiella
  - Fortiellopsis
  - Gordejeviella
  - Granulochloris
  - Hemitoma
  - Iyengariomonas
  - Melomonas
  - Pedinopera
  - Pedinoperopsis
  - Phacotus
  - Pteromonas
  - Pyramidococcus
  - Thoracomonas
  - Tingitanella
  - Troitskiella
  - Wislouchiella
- Family Pleurastraceae
- Pleurastrum
- Family Protosiphonaceae
  - †Microchorton
  - Protosiphon
  - Spongiosarcinopsis
  - Urnella
- Family Sphaerocystidaceae
  - Dictyochlorella
  - Heleochloris
  - Korschpalmella
  - Planctococcus
  - Planochloris
  - Sphaerocystis
  - Topaczevskiella
- Family Sphaerodictyaceae
  - Dictyastrum
  - Pectodictyon
  - Sphaerodictyon
- Family Spondylomoraceae
  - Chlorcorona
  - Pascherina
  - Pyrobotrys
  - Spondylomorum
- Family Tetrabaenaceae
  - Basichlamys
  - Tetrabaena
- Family Tetrasporaceae
  - Apiocystis
  - Askenasyella
  - Chlorangiochaete
  - Chlorokremys
  - Fottiella
  - Gloeodendron
  - Octosporiella
  - Paulschulzia
  - Phacomyxa
  - Placosphaera
  - Polychaetochloris
  - Porochloris
  - Stapfia
  - Tetraspora
- Family Volvocaceae
  - Colemanosphaera
  - †Eovolvox
  - Eudorina
  - Hamakko
  - Hemiflagellochloris
  - Lundiella
  - Mastigosphaera
  - Pandorina
  - Paragonium
  - Platydorina
  - Platymonas
  - Pleodorina
  - †Polyderma
  - Stephanoon
  - Tabris
  - Volvox
  - †Volvoximorphites
  - Volvulina
  - Yamagishiella
- Family Wislouchiaceae
  - Wislouchia
- Incertae sedis
  - Adglutina
  - Akraea
  - Alvikia
  - †Chlorellopsis
  - Chlorolilaea
  - Chloropteridella
  - Desmatractum
  - Echinosphaerella
  - Edaphochlamys
  - Ettlia
  - †Glenobotrydion
  - †Globophycus
  - Graesiella
  - Gymnomonas
  - Halochlorella
  - Hapalochloris
  - Hydrianum
  - Leontynka
  - Lercomonas
  - Limnomonas
  - Lobosphaeropsis
  - Muriellopsis
  - Ostravamonas
  - †Palaeastrum
  - Pseudochlorothecium
  - Rosetta
  - Tetraflagellochloris

== Order Oedogoniales ==
- Family Oedogoniaceae
  - Bulbochaete
  - Oedocladium
  - Oedogonium
  - Pseudoprostratum

== Order Sphaeropleales ==
- Family Bracteacoccaceae
  - Bracteacoccus
- Family Bracteamorphaceae
  - Bracteamorpha
- Family Characiaceae
  - Acrochasma
  - Actidesmium
  - Characiella
  - Characiellopsis
  - Characium
  - Craniocystis
  - Deuterocharacium
  - Korshikoviella
  - Lanceola
  - Marthea
  - Pseudoschroederia
- Family Chromochloridaceae
  - Chromochloris
- Family Cylindrocapsaceae
  - Cylindrocapsa
  - Cylindrocapsopsis
  - Fusola
- Family Dictyochloridaceae
  - Dictyochloris
- Family Dictyococcaceae
  - Dictyococcus
- Family Hydrodictyaceae
  - Cerasterias
  - Closteridium
  - Euastropsis
  - Helierella
  - Hydrodictyon
  - †Hydrodictyopsis
  - Lacunastrum
  - Monactinus
  - Parapediastrum
  - †Pediastrites
  - Pediastrum
  - Pseudopediastrum
  - Sorastrum
  - Sphaerastrum
  - Stauridium
  - Tetraedroides
  - Tetraedron
  - Tetrapedia
- Family Microsporaceae
  - Flintia
  - Microspora
- Family Mychonastaceae
  - Mychonastes
- Family Neochloridaceae
  - Botryosphaerella
  - Chlorotetraedron
  - Echinosphaeridium
  - Golenkinia
  - Neochloris
  - Poloidion
- Family Nephrocytiaceae
  - Nephrocytium
- Family Pseudomuriellaceae
  - Pseudomuriella
- Family Radiococcaceae
  - Catenococcus
  - Chlororustica
  - Coenobotrys
  - Coenochloris
  - Coenococcus
  - Coenocystis
  - Coenodispora
  - Crucigloea
  - Diplosphaeropsis
  - Eutetramorus
  - Garhundacystis
  - Gloeocystis
  - Herndonia
  - Hindakochloris
  - Korshikoviobispora
  - Neocystis
  - Palmellosphaerium
  - Palmococcus
  - Palmodictyon
  - Pharao
  - Radiococcus
  - Schizochloris
  - Sphaerochlamydella
  - Sphaerochloris
  - Sphaerococcomyxa
  - Sphaeroneocystis
  - Sporotetras
  - Thorakochloris
  - Tomaculum
- Family Rotundellaceae
  - Rotundella
- Family Scenedesmaceae
  - Acutodesmus
  - Asterarcys
  - Chodatodesmus
  - Closteriococcus
  - Coccoidesmus
  - Coelastrella
  - Coelastropsis
  - Coelastrum
  - Comasiella
  - Crucigeniopsis
  - Danubia
  - Desmodesmus
  - Dimorphococcus
  - Enallax
  - Flechtneria
  - Gilbertsmithia
  - Hariotina
  - Hylodesmus
  - Komarekia
  - Lauterborniella
  - Neodesmus
  - Pectinodesmus
  - Pediludiella
  - Pseudodidymocystis
  - Pseudotetradesmus
  - Scenedesmus
  - Sceneoocystis
  - Schistochilium
  - Schmidledesmus
  - Schroederiella
  - Scotiellopsis
  - Soropediastrum
  - Staurogenia
  - Steinedesmus
  - Tetradesmus
  - Tetrallantos
  - Tetranephris
  - Tetrastrum
  - †Trypophobiacites
  - Verrucodesmus
  - Westella
  - Westellopsis
  - Yadavaea
- Family Schizochlamydaceae
  - Follicularia
  - Planktosphaeria
  - Schizochlamys
- Family Schroederiaceae
  - Schroederia
- Family Selenastraceae
  - Ankistrodesmus
  - Curvastrum
  - Drepanochloris
  - Gregiochloris
  - Kirchneriella
  - Messastrum
  - Monoraphidium
  - Planktococcomyxa
  - Podohedriella
  - Pseudokirchneriella
  - Pseudoquadrigula
  - Quadrigula
  - Raphidocelis
  - Selenastrum
  - Viridiparva
- Family Sphaeropleaceae
  - Ankyra
  - Atractomorpha
  - Characiopodium
  - Radiofilum
  - Sphaeroplea
- Family Treubariaceae
  - Treubaria
- Family Tumidellaceae
  - Tumidella
- Incertae sedis
  - Johansenicoccus
  - Polyedriopsis

== Incertae sedis ==
- †Aristophycos
- Biala
- Bicuspidella
- †Brachydactylus
- †Buzgulella
- †Calathella
- Capsulococcus
- †Cladiscothallus
- †Corallinites
- Diplochloris
- †Dumbellina
- Hydrurites
- Jenufa
- Jolyella
- †Kinwowia
- †Kordesphecia
- Lobocystis
- †Menieria
- †Ningbingellina
- †Palambages
- †Pseudoconus
- †Pyramidosporites
- †Rajkaella
- †Sarcinophycus
- †Sinocapsa
- Sphaerobotrys
- †Thaumatoporella
- †Toutinella
- †Valonites
- Variochloris
- Wareniococcus
- †Yukonella
