= Chlorofilum =

Scientific classification
- Kingdom: Plantae
- Division: Chlorophyta
- Class: Chlorophyceae
- Order: Chaetophorales
- Family: Chaetophoraceae
- Genus: Chlorofilum; P. Dangeard, 1966

Type species
- Chlorofilum ephemerum P. Dangeard, 1966

Species
- Chlorofilum ephemerum

Genus of algae

Chlorofilum is a genus of green algae in the family Chaetophoraceae.
