= Herposteiron =

Scientific classification
- Kingdom: Plantae
- Division: Chlorophyta
- Class: Chlorophyceae
- Order: Chaetophorales
- Family: Chaetophoraceae
- Genus: Herposteiron; Nägeli in Kützing, 1849

Type species
- Herposteiron confervicola Nägeli, 1849

Species
- Herposteiron confervicola

Genus of algae

Herposteiron is a genus of green algae in the family Chaetophoraceae.
