= Streptochlora =

Scientific classification
- Clade: Viridiplantae
- Division: Chlorophyta
- Class: Chlorophyceae
- Order: Chaetophorales
- Family: Chaetophoraceae
- Genus: Streptochlora; J.B.Petersen & J.B.Hansen, 1960
- Species: S. moniliformis

Binomial name
- Streptochlora moniliformis J.B.Petersen & J.B.Hansen

Genus of algae

Streptochlora is a genus of green algae in the family Chaetophoraceae. It includes the sole species Streptochlora moniliformis.

The genus is little-known and has been recorded only once from the surface film of a lake in Denmark. It might be a germination stage of Leptosira or Gloeoplax.
