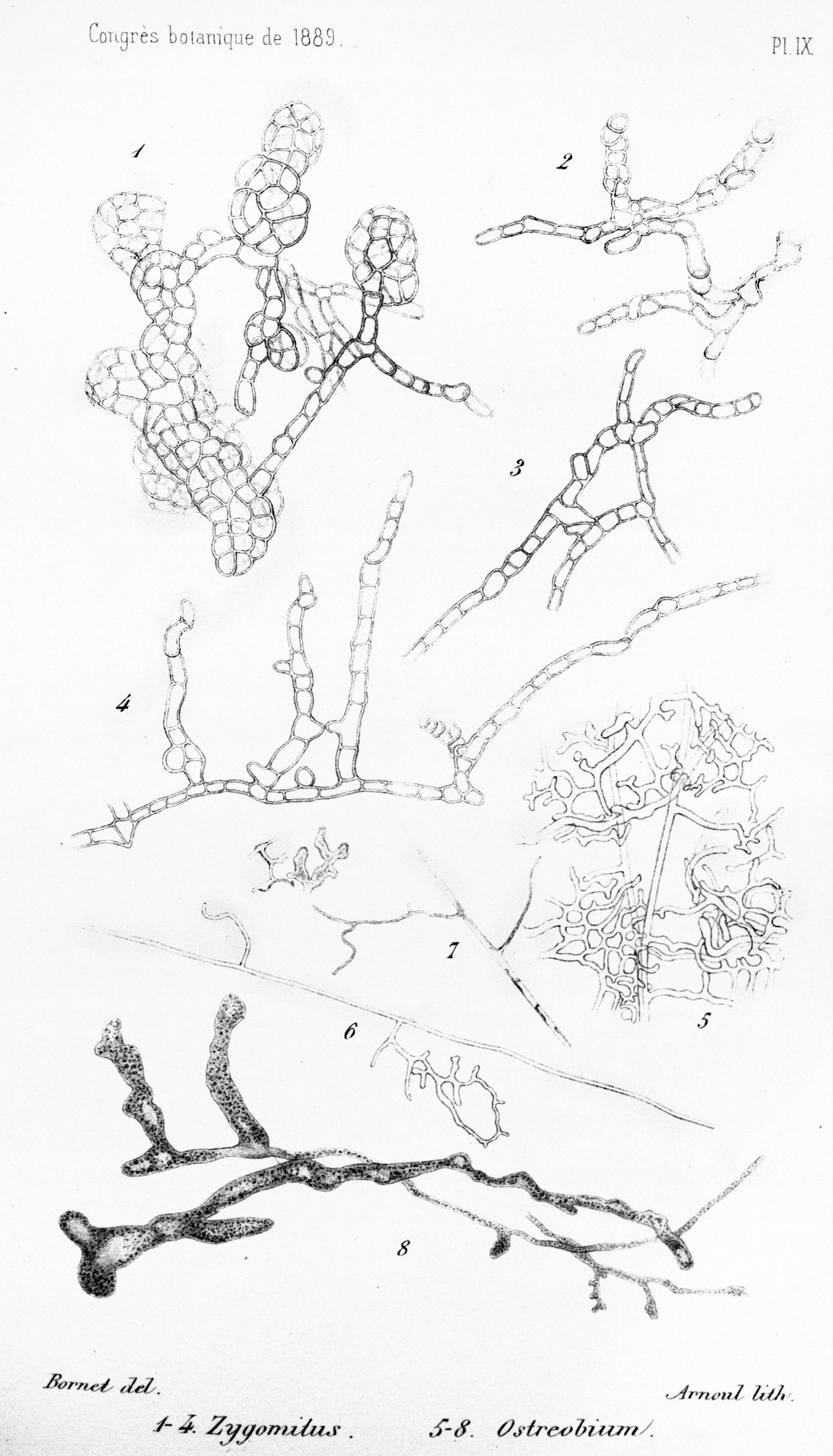

Scientific classification
- Clade: Viridiplantae
- Division: Chlorophyta
- Class: Chlorophyceae
- Order: Chaetophorales
- Family: Chaetophoraceae
- Genus: Zygomitus; Bornet & Flahault, 1889
- Species: Z. reticulatus

Binomial name
- Zygomitus reticulatus Bornet & Flahault

= Zygomitus =

Genus of algae

Zygomitus is a genus of green algae in the family Chaetophoraceae. It contains the single species Zygomitus reticulatus.
