= Ireksokonia =

Scientific classification
- Clade: Viridiplantae
- Division: Chlorophyta
- Class: Chlorophyceae
- Order: Chaetophorales
- Family: Chaetophoraceae
- Genus: Ireksokonia; K. J. Meyer, 1927
- Species: I. formosa

Binomial name
- Ireksokonia formosa K. J. Meyer, 1927

Genus of algae

Ireksokonia is a genus of green algae in the family Chaetophoraceae. It contains a single species, Ireksokonia formosa, which is endemic to Lake Baikal. It is similar to Stigeoclonium, but is generally larger and has a reticulate chloroplast.
