= N. terrestris =

N. terrestris may refer to:

- Nayalia terrestris, an alga species
- Neochloris terrestris, an alga species
- Notosuchus terrestris, an extinct crocodile species

== See also ==
- Terrestris
