= Zoddaea =

Scientific classification
- Kingdom: Plantae
- Division: Chlorophyta
- Class: Chlorophyceae
- Order: Chaetophorales
- Family: Chaetophoraceae
- Genus: Zoddaea; Borzi, 1906
- Species: Z. viridis

Binomial name
- Zoddaea viridis Borzi, 1906

Genus of algae

Zoddaea is a monotypic genus of green algae in the family Chaetophoraceae. It only contains one known species, Zoddaea viridis Borzì.

The genus and species were circumscribed by Antonino Borzì in Nuova Notarisia vol. 17 on page 14 in 1906.

The genus name of Zoddaea is in honour of Giuseppe Zodda (1877–1968), who was an Italian botanist, Plant Geographer and teacher/Professor of Botany in Messina and several other places, including Mantua, Naples and Bari. He wrote 'Flora italica cryptogamica' and 'Studi sulla flora teramana'. The specific epithet (viridis) is a Latin word meaning "green", referring to the colour of the algae.
