= T. variabilis =

T. variabilis may refer to:

- Thamniochloris variabilis, an alga species in the genus Thamniochloris
- Tillandsia variabilis, a plant species native to Bolivia, Costa Rica, Mexico and the United States
- Tramitichromis variabilis, a fish species found in Malawi, Mozambique and Tanzania
- Trialeurodes variabilis, the papaya whitefly, an insect species in the genus Trialeurodes
- Typhula variabilis, a plant pathogen species
