= Pleurangium =

Scientific classification
- Clade: Viridiplantae
- Division: Chlorophyta
- Class: Chlorophyceae
- Order: Chaetophorales
- Family: Chaetophoraceae
- Genus: Pleurangium; Skuja, 1937
- Species: P. amphibium

Binomial name
- Pleurangium amphibium Skuja

Genus of algae

Pleurangium is a genus of green algae in the family Chaetophoraceae, containing the sole species Pleurangium amphibium.

Pleurangium amphibium is found in freshwater in a limestone area of China.
