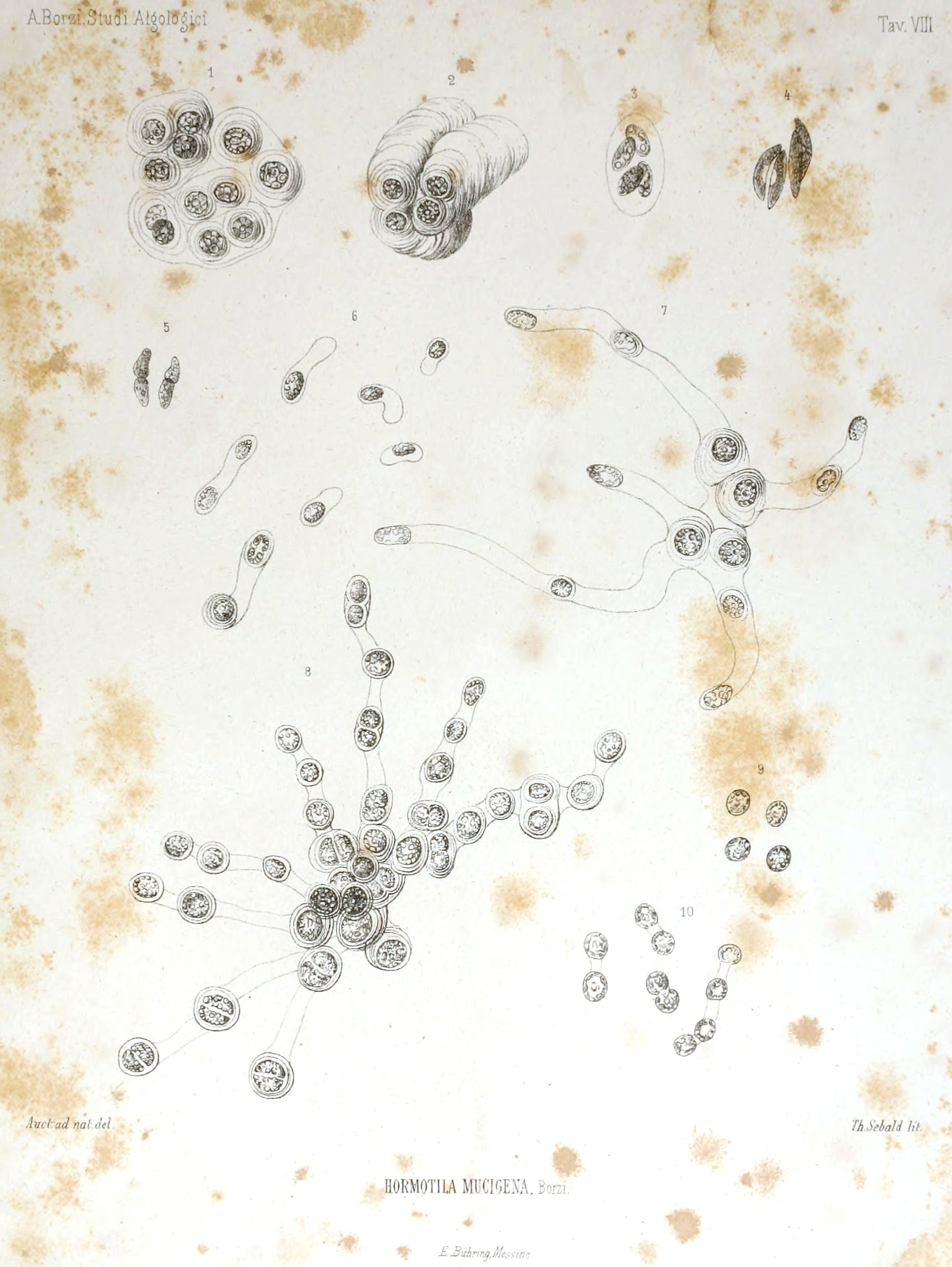

Scientific classification
- Clade: Viridiplantae
- Division: Chlorophyta
- Class: Chlorophyceae
- Order: Chaetophorales
- Family: Chaetophoraceae
- Genus: Hormotila; A.A. Borzì, 1883

Type species
- Hormotila mucigena

Species
- Hormotila blennista; Hormotila mucigena

= Hormotila =

Genus of algae

Hormotila is a genus of green algae in the family Chaetophoraceae. The genus was circumscribed by Antonino Borzì in 1883.

The type species of Hormotila, Hormotila mucigena, as originally illustrated by Borzì, was a heterogenous assemblage of different algae. Some of his figures showed cells in laminated layers of mucilage, reminiscent of Gloeocystis or Urococcus. In other figures, the cells were in branched, tubular layers of mucilage. Still other figures showed figures reminiscent of Oocystis, Ankistrodesmus or Elakatothrix. In 2016, Daniel E. Wujek and Michael J. Wynne redefined the genus by emending the description of the type species to only include the second sense, i.e. cells in branched tubes.

== Former family ==
Hormotila was formerly the type genus of the family Hormotilaceae. As of March 2022, AlgaeBase no longer included any genera in the family, although some sources listed the family but without the type genus.
