= Crenacantha =

Scientific classification
- Kingdom: Plantae
- Division: Chlorophyta
- Class: Chlorophyceae
- Order: Chaetophorales
- Family: Chaetophoraceae
- Genus: Crenacantha; Kützing, 1843

Type species
- Crenacantha orientalis

Species
- Crenacantha orientalis

Genus of algae

Crenacantha is a genus of green algae in the family Chaetophoraceae.
