= Gongrosirella =

Scientific classification
- Clade: Viridiplantae
- Division: Chlorophyta
- Class: Chlorophyceae
- Order: Chaetophorales
- Family: Chaetophoraceae
- Genus: Gongrosirella; P.A.Dangeard, 1970
- Species: G. vermiformis

Binomial name
- Gongrosirella vermiformis P.A.Dangeard, 1970

Genus of algae

Gongrosirella is a genus of green algae in the family Chaetophoraceae, containing the sole species Gongrosirella vermiformis.
