= Jaagiella =

Scientific classification
- Domain: Eukaryota
- Supergroup: Archaeplastida
- Clade: Viridiplantae
- Division: Chlorophyta
- Class: Chlorophyceae
- Order: Chaetophorales
- Family: Chaetophoraceae
- Genus: Jaagiella; Vischer
- Species: J. alpicola

Binomial name
- Jaagiella alpicola Vischer, 1960

Genus of algae

Jaagiella is a genus of green algae in the family Chaetophoraceae.

The genus name of Jaagiella is in honour of Otto Jaag (1900-1978), who was a Swissr (Hydro-)Biology (botanist, interested in Algology and Mykology) and was Professor of Hydrobiology at the ETH in Zürich.

The genus was circumscribed by Wilhelm Vischer in Schweiz. Z. Hydrol. vol.22 on pages 330 and 346 in 1960.

The taxonomic status of Jagagiella is uncertain. Some sources suggest it is synonymous with Filoprotococcus, with the latter name having priority.
