= Kymatotrichon =

Scientific classification
- Clade: Viridiplantae
- Division: Chlorophyta
- Class: Chlorophyceae
- Order: Chaetophorales
- Family: Chaetophoraceae
- Genus: Kymatotrichon; B.Schussnig
- Species: K. armatum

Binomial name
- Kymatotrichon armatum B.Schussnig, 1928

Genus of algae

Kymatotrichon is a genus of green algae in the family Chaetophoraceae. It contains the single species Kymatotrichon armatum.

It is an epiphyte on the marine macroalga Ceramium, and has been recorded from the intertidal zone of the northern Adriatic Sea.
