= Cedercreutziella =

Scientific classification
- Clade: Viridiplantae
- Division: Chlorophyta
- Class: Chlorophyceae
- Order: Chaetophorales
- Family: Chaetophoraceae
- Genus: Cedercreutziella; Vischer, 1960
- Species: C. savoniensis

Binomial name
- Cedercreutziella savoniensis Vischer, 1960

Genus of algae

Cedercreutziella is a genus of green algae in the family Chaetophoraceae, containing the sole species Cedercreutziella savoniensis. It has been found only once, in Finland growing on damp walls.
