= Didymosporangium =

Scientific classification
- Kingdom: Plantae
- Division: Chlorophyta
- Class: Chlorophyceae
- Order: Chaetophorales
- Family: Chaetophoraceae
- Genus: Didymosporangium; Lambert

Type species
- Didymosporangium repens Lambert

Species
- Didymosporangium repens

Genus of algae

Didymosporangium is a genus of green algae in the family Chaetophoraceae.
