= Chaetonemopsis =

Scientific classification
- Kingdom: Plantae
- Division: Chlorophyta
- Class: Chlorophyceae
- Order: Chaetophorales
- Family: Chaetophoraceae
- Genus: Chaetonemopsis; L. Gauthier-Lièvre, 1954

Type species
- Chaetonemopsis pseudobulbochaete L.Gautheir-Lièvre, 1954

Species
- Chaetonemopsis pseudoaphanochaete; Chaetonemopsis pseudobulbochaete

Genus of algae

Chaetonemopsis is a genus of green algae in the family Chaetophoraceae.

Chaetonemopsis consists of uniseriate filaments which are laterally and alternately branched. Cells have long, basally swollen hairs; terminal cells often have two such hairs. Cells are uninucleate with a chloroplast. Sexual reproduction is oogamous, in which the egg is released from the oogonium but remaining attached via a thin, cytoplasmic thread.

The taxonomic status of this genus is unclear. Some taxonomists have suggested that the morphological features of Chaetonemopsis are actually produced by a different genus Bulbochaete parasitized by an amoeba.
