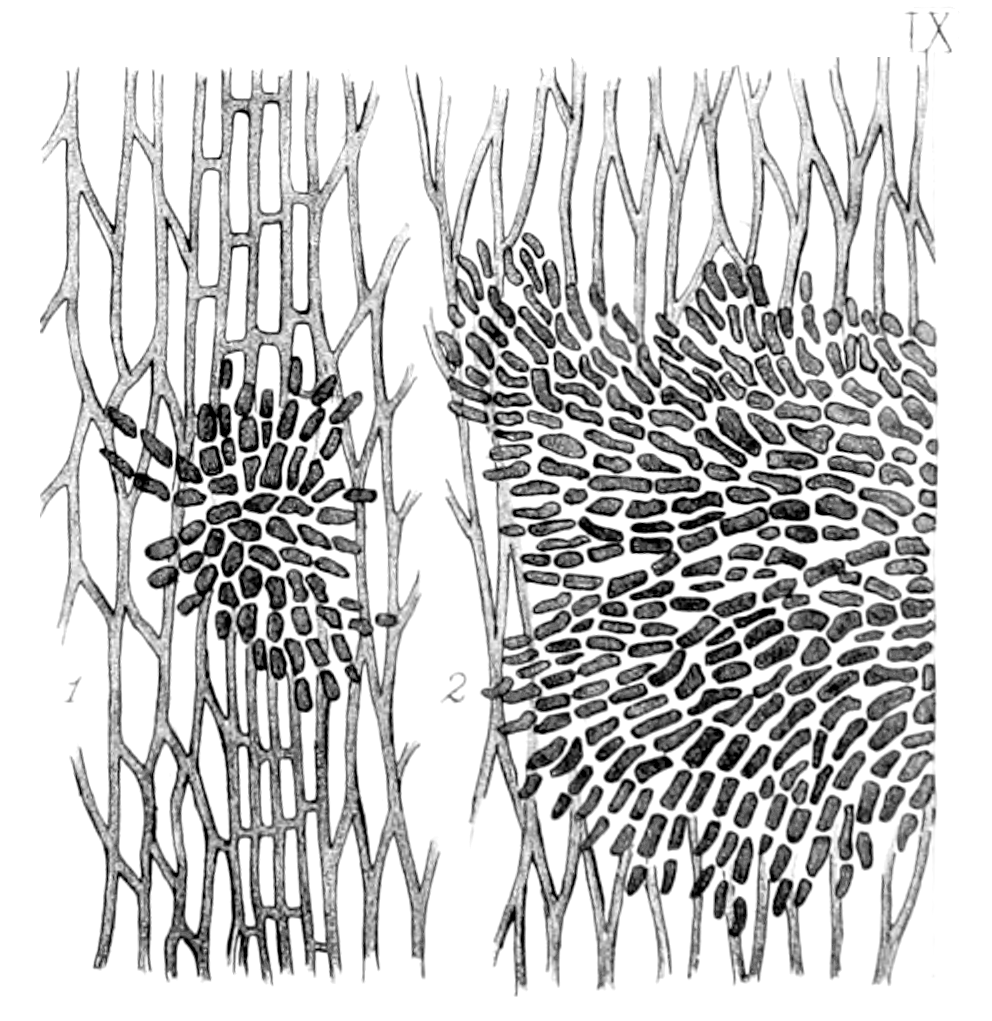
- small and large strand of Choreoclonium procumbens parasitizing a moss leaflet

Scientific classification
- Kingdom: Plantae
- Division: Chlorophyta
- Class: Chlorophyceae
- Order: Chaetophorales
- Family: Chaetophoraceae
- Genus: Choreoclonium; Reinsch, 1876

Type species
- Choreoclonium procumbens Reinsch, 1876

Species
- Choreoclonium procumbens

= Choreoclonium =

Genus of algae

Choreoclonium is a genus of green algae in the family Chaetophoraceae.
