= Elaterodiscus =

Scientific classification
- Clade: Viridiplantae
- Division: Chlorophyta
- Class: Chlorophyceae
- Order: Chaetophorales
- Family: Chaetophoraceae
- Genus: Elaterodiscus; P. A. Dangeard
- Species: E. appendiculatus

Binomial name
- Elaterodiscus appendiculatus P. A. Dangeard, 1976

Genus of algae

Elaterodiscus is a genus of green algae in the family Chaetophoraceae. It includes the sole species Elaterodiscus appendiculatus.
