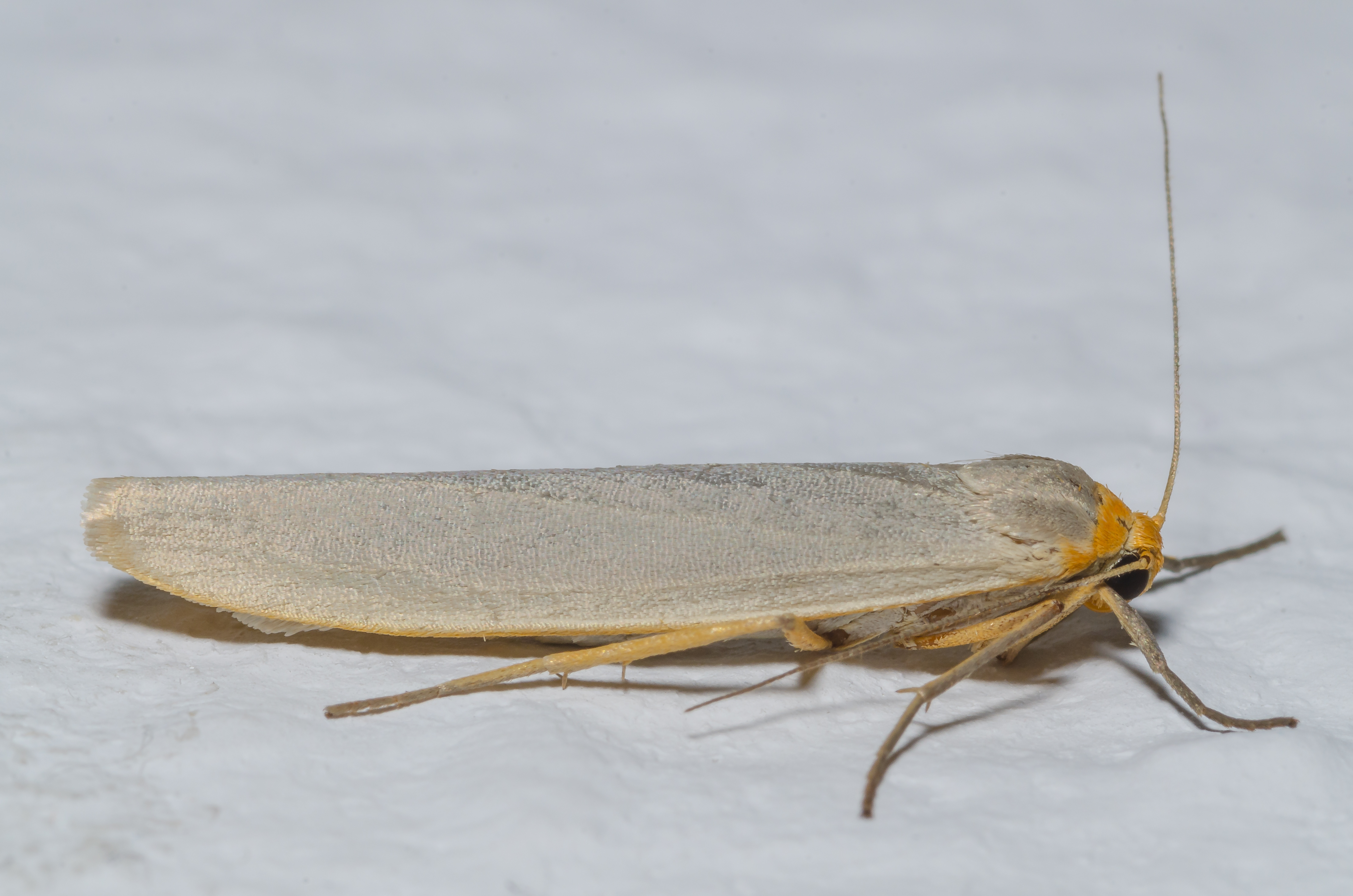

Scientific classification
- Kingdom: Animalia
- Phylum: Arthropoda
- Clade: Pancrustacea
- Class: Insecta
- Order: Lepidoptera
- Superfamily: Noctuoidea
- Family: Erebidae
- Subfamily: Arctiinae
- Genus: Eilema
- Species: E. caniola

Binomial name
- Eilema caniola (Hübner, 1808)

Synonyms
- List: Bombyx caniola Hübner, [1808]; Bombyx albeola Hübner, [1824]; Lithosia lacteola Boisduval, 1834; Lithosia carniola Guérin-Ménéville, 1867; Lithosia albula Walker, 1854; Lithosia cameola Birchall, 1865; Lithosia caniola var. complanoides Fuchs, 1891; Eilema caniola gibrati Oberthür, 1922; Eilema torstenii von Mentzer, 1980

= Eilema caniola =

Species of moth

Eilema caniola, the hoary footman, is a moth of the family Erebidae. The species was first described by Jacob Hübner in 1808.

== Subspecies ==
- Eilema caniola caniola
- Eilema caniola torstenii von Mentzer, 1980 (Spain)

== Distribution and habitat ==
This species can be found in North Africa, in western and southern Europe, in eastern Europe up to south-western Russia, in the Near East, in the eastern Palearctic realm, and in the Oriental realm. These thermophilic moths usually occur in urban areas and as a caterpillar on old walls, roofs, shingle beaches, and rocky areas.

== Technical description and variation ==
The wingspan is 28–35 mm. It is almost the same in colouring as Eilema griseola and Eilema lurideola but the forewings are much smaller, the outer margin is oblique, only slightly excurved; the colour is much lighter, more yellowish grey, so that the pale yellow costal stripe is less prominent. Hindwings are very pale, scarcely darker at the costal margin, with the apex much more pointed than in the two species mentioned, with which it might be confounded.

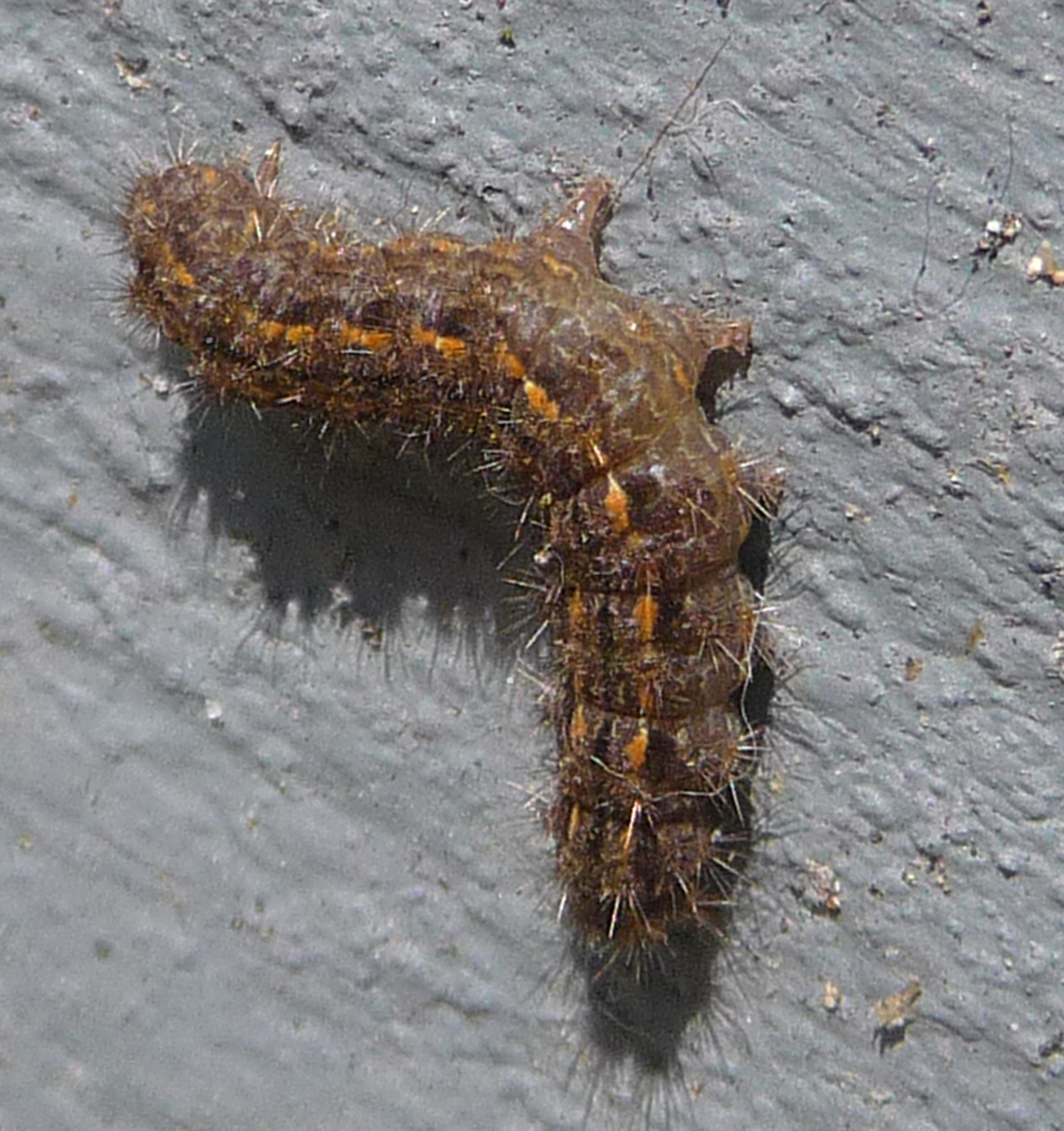
Larva

It is at once distinguished from Eilema complanum by the underside of the forewing, on which the pale grey colour extends to the margin, the latter not being broadly yellow as in E. complanum. - ab. vitellina Bdv. is a form with the forewing dusted with grey close to the distal margin and of a pale bright yellow ground colour in the male - ab. albeola Hbn. is considerably smaller, and, except for the bright yellow thorax, entirely white on the upperside; it occurs among ordinary specimens.

Larvae are grey or reddish brown with dark dorsal line, red subdorsal lines edged with black and occasionally spotted with white or black.

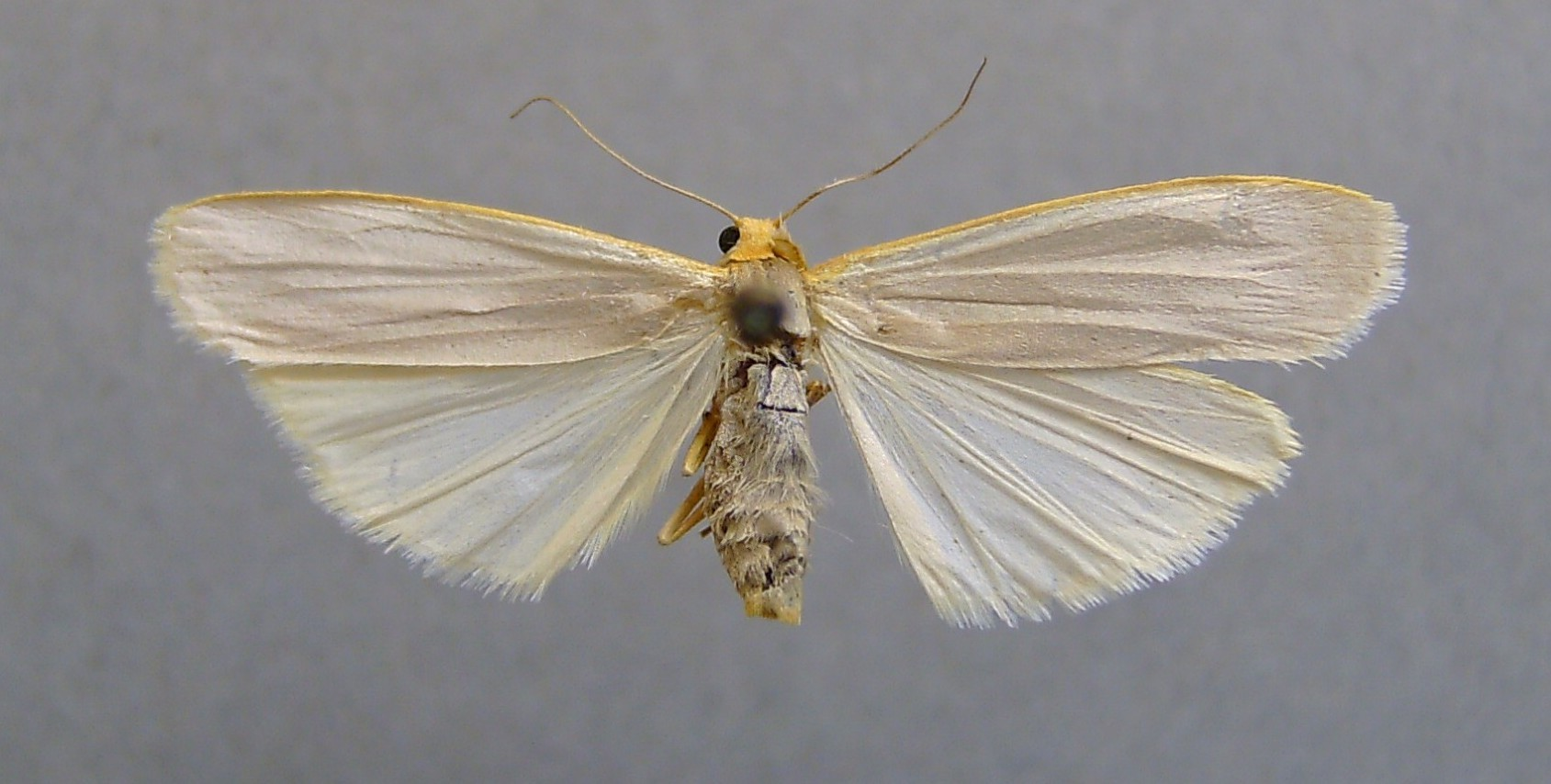
Mounted specimen

== Biology ==
These moths are nocturnal and rest at day on shady rocks. They fly in two or three generations from July to September depending on the location. They are attracted to light. The larvae mainly feed on algae, especially on green films of Pleurococcus and on a variety of lichens growing on rocks, but also on the flowers of broom (Genista sp.), birdsfoot trefoil (Lotus sp.) and clover (Trifolium sp.).

== Bibliography ==
- Erstbeschreibung: Hübner, J. [1800-1838]: Sammlung europäischer Schmetterlinge 3: pl. 1-83.
- Guide des papillons nocturnes de France, Paris, Delachaux et Niestlé, 2007, 288 p. (ISBN 978-2-603-01429-5), p. 93, n° 801.
- Huemer, P. & W. Rabitsch (2002): 6.3.19 Schmetterlinge (Lepidoptera). - 354-362. In: Essl, F. & W. Rabitsch (2002): Neobiota in Österreich. - 432 S.; Umweltbundesamt, Wien. [pdf-Version: http://homepage.univie.ac.at/wolfgang.rabitsch/DP089.pdf ]
- L. N. Perette, F. Spill & M. Rauch, Les Papillons de la Réserve de la Biosphère des Vosges du Nord, Eguelshardt, Cicogna, 33 (N. sp.), octobre 2009, 324 p. (ISBN 978-2-9533006-1-1), p. 200
- Mentzer, E. (1980): Eilema torstenii n. sp. and E. iberica n. sp. from Spain, with notes on E. pseudocomplana (Daniel) (Lepidoptera: Arctiidae). Insect Systematics & Evolution 11 (1): 9-16 [Abstract auf ingentaconnect.com].
- Rezbanyai, L. (1981): Neue Erkenntnisse über die vor kurzem erkannte endemische Flechtenbär-Art von Mallorca, Eilema torstenii v. Mentzer 1980 (Lep.: Arctiidae). Entomologische Zeitschrift mit Insektenbörse 91 (12): 129-138.
- Ebert, G. (1997): Die Gattung Eilema. In: Ebert, G.: Die Schmetterlinge Baden-Württembergs, Bd. 5. — Stuttgart (Verlag Eugen Ulmer), S. 234-267.
