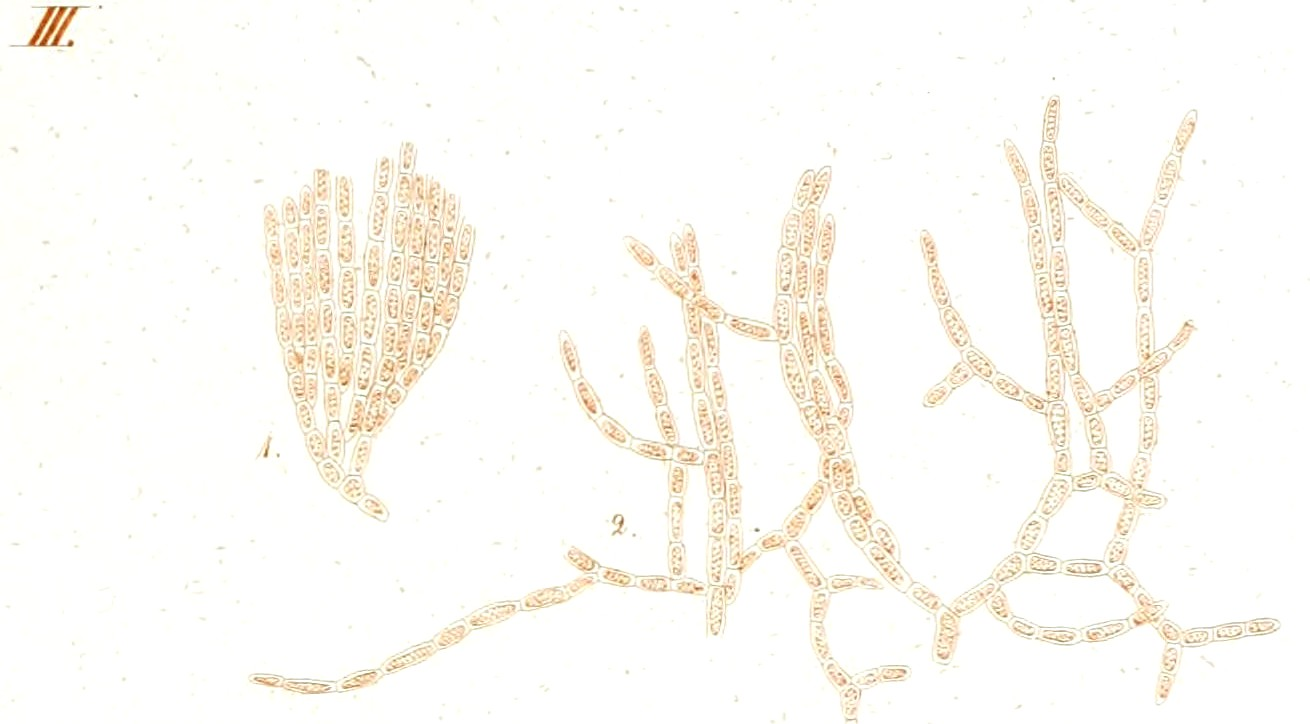

Scientific classification
- Kingdom: Plantae
- Division: Chlorophyta
- Class: Chlorophyceae
- Order: Chaetophorales
- Family: Chaetophoraceae
- Genus: Periplegmatium; Kützing, 1843

Type species
- Periplegmatium ceramii Kützing, 1843

Species
- Periplegmatium ceramii

= Periplegmatium =

Genus of algae

Periplegmatium is a genus of green algae in the family Chaetophoraceae.
