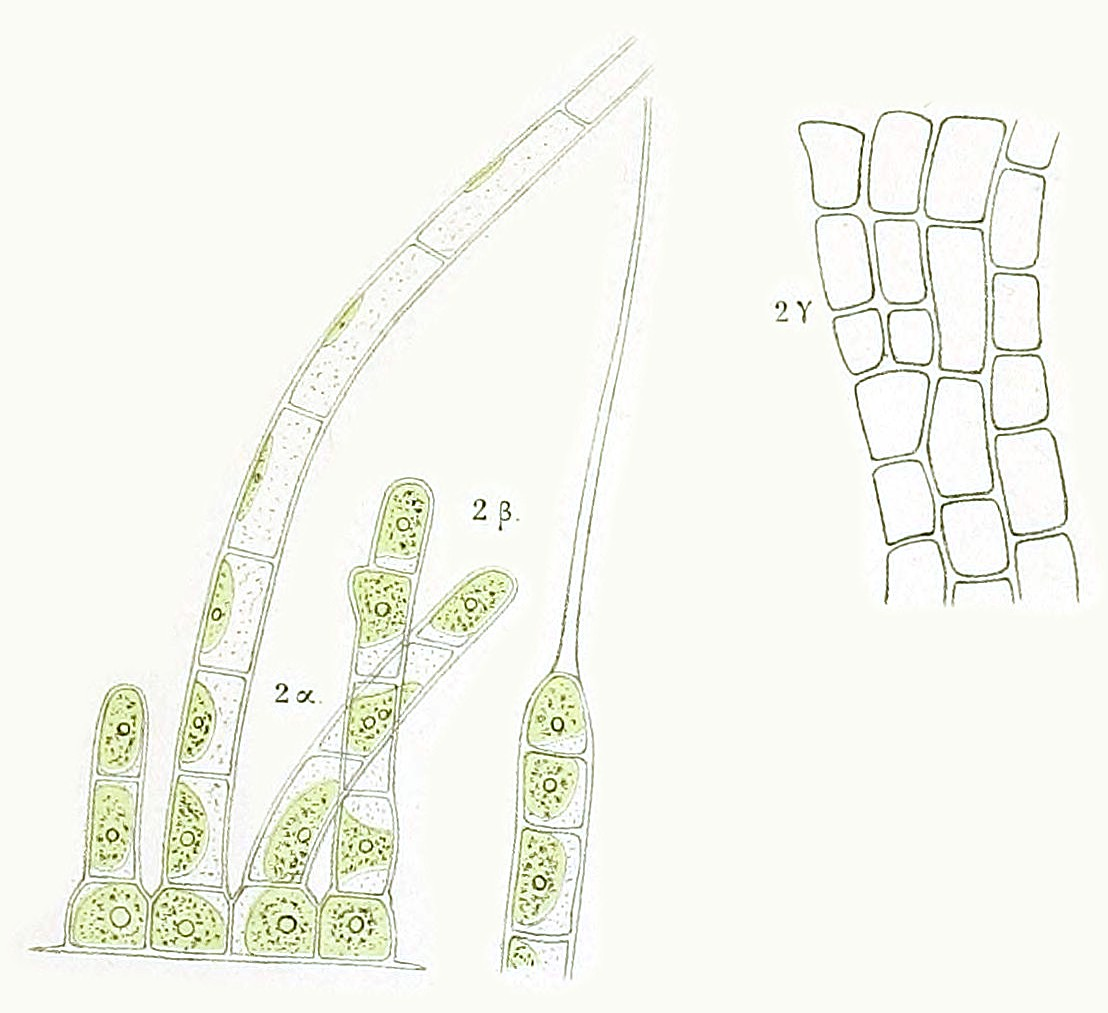
- Endoclonium marinum

Scientific classification
- Kingdom: Plantae
- Division: Chlorophyta
- Class: Chlorophyceae
- Order: Chaetophorales
- Family: Chaetophoraceae
- Genus: Endoclonium; Czymanski

Species
- Endoclonium marinum; Endoclonium pygmaeum

= Endoclonium =

Genus of algae

Endoclonium is a genus of green algae in the family Chaetophoraceae.
