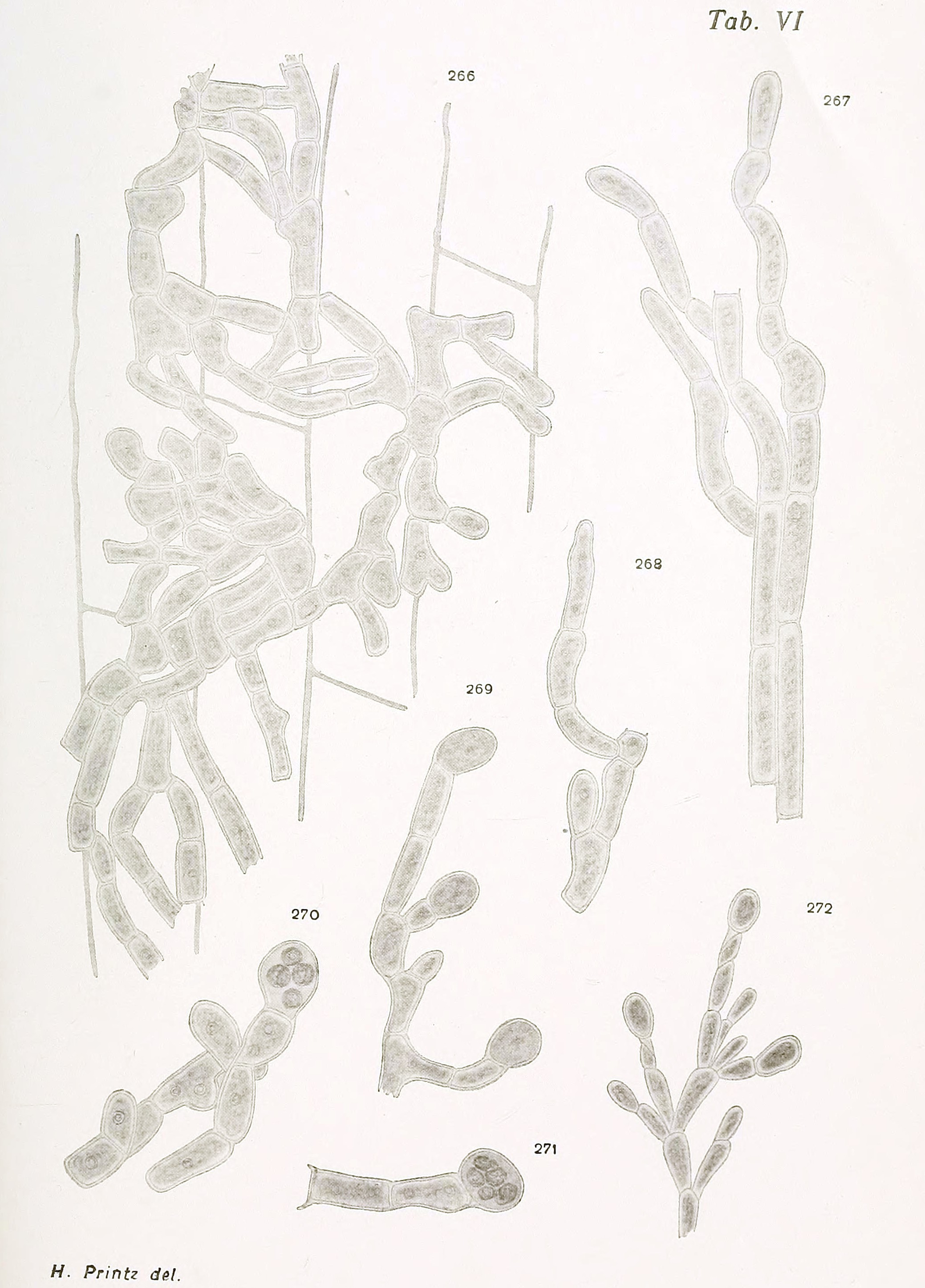
- Epibolium dermaticola

Scientific classification
- Kingdom: Plantae
- Division: Chlorophyta
- Class: Chlorophyceae
- Order: Chaetophorales
- Family: Chaetophoraceae
- Genus: Epibolium; Printz, 1916

Type species
- Epibolium dermaticola Printz, 1916

Species
- Epibolium dermaticola; Epibolium polysporum

= Epibolium =

Genus of algae

Epibolium is a genus of green algae in the family Chaetophoraceae.
