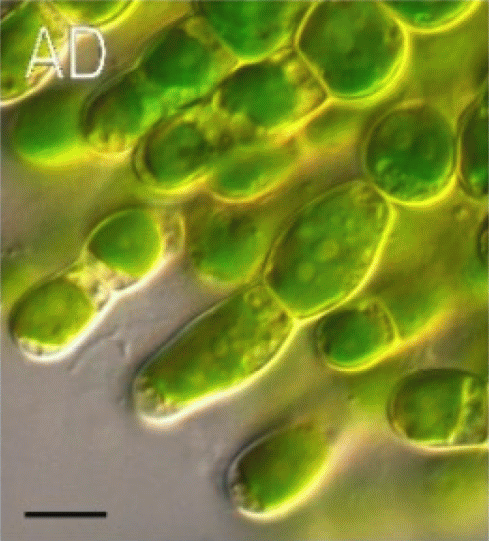
- Leptosira obovata

Scientific classification
- Clade: Viridiplantae
- Division: Chlorophyta
- Class: Trebouxiophyceae
- Order: incertae sedis
- Family: incertae sedis
- Genus: Leptosira; Borzi, 1883

Type species
- Leptosira mediciana

Species
- Leptosira erumpens (Deason & Bold) Lukešová; Leptosira jollyi (P.Sarma) H.Ettl & G.Gärtner; Leptosira mediciana Borzì; Leptosira obovata Vischer; Leptosira polychloris Reisigl; Leptosira thrombii Tschermak-Woess; Leptosira vischeri Reisigl

= Leptosira =

Genus of algae

Leptosira is a genus of green algae, in the class Trebouxiophyceae. It is epiphytic on aqutic plants, and is found in freshwater habitats or in soil.

== Description ==
Leptosira forms cushion-like tufts of branched, erect and prostrate filaments. The filaments are uniseriate, irregularly or dichotomously branched, with the side branches short. Cells are spherical to barrel-shaped to irregular. The cell contains a single nucleus and a parietal chloroplast; pyrenoids are absent or masked by starch.

Reproduction occurs both sexually and asexually. Asexual reproduction occurs via biflagellate zoospores, 20 to 60 produced per cell, or aplanospores which are spherical and produced in groups of four to several per sporangium. Sexual reproduction is isogamous and the gametes are biflagellate.

== Taxonomy ==
The taxonomy of Leptosira is somewhat uncertain. Similar genera (Leptosiropsis, Pleurastrum have been separated from Leptosira on the basis of having a pyrenoid). However, because Leptosira apparently has a pyrenoid but is difficult to observe, the status of the genera need reexamination.

Leptosira is placed within Trebouxiophyceae, but phylogenetic analyses show that it occupies a unique lineage not corresponding to existing clades or orders.
