= Tumulofilum =

Scientific classification
- Clade: Viridiplantae
- Division: Chlorophyta
- Class: Chlorophyceae
- Order: Chaetophorales
- Family: Chaetophoraceae
- Genus: Tumulofilum; H.Berger, 1941
- Species: T. terrestre

Binomial name
- Tumulofilum terrestre H.Berger

Genus of algae

Tumulofilum is a genus of green algae in the family Chaetophoraceae, containing the single species Tumulofilum terrestre.
