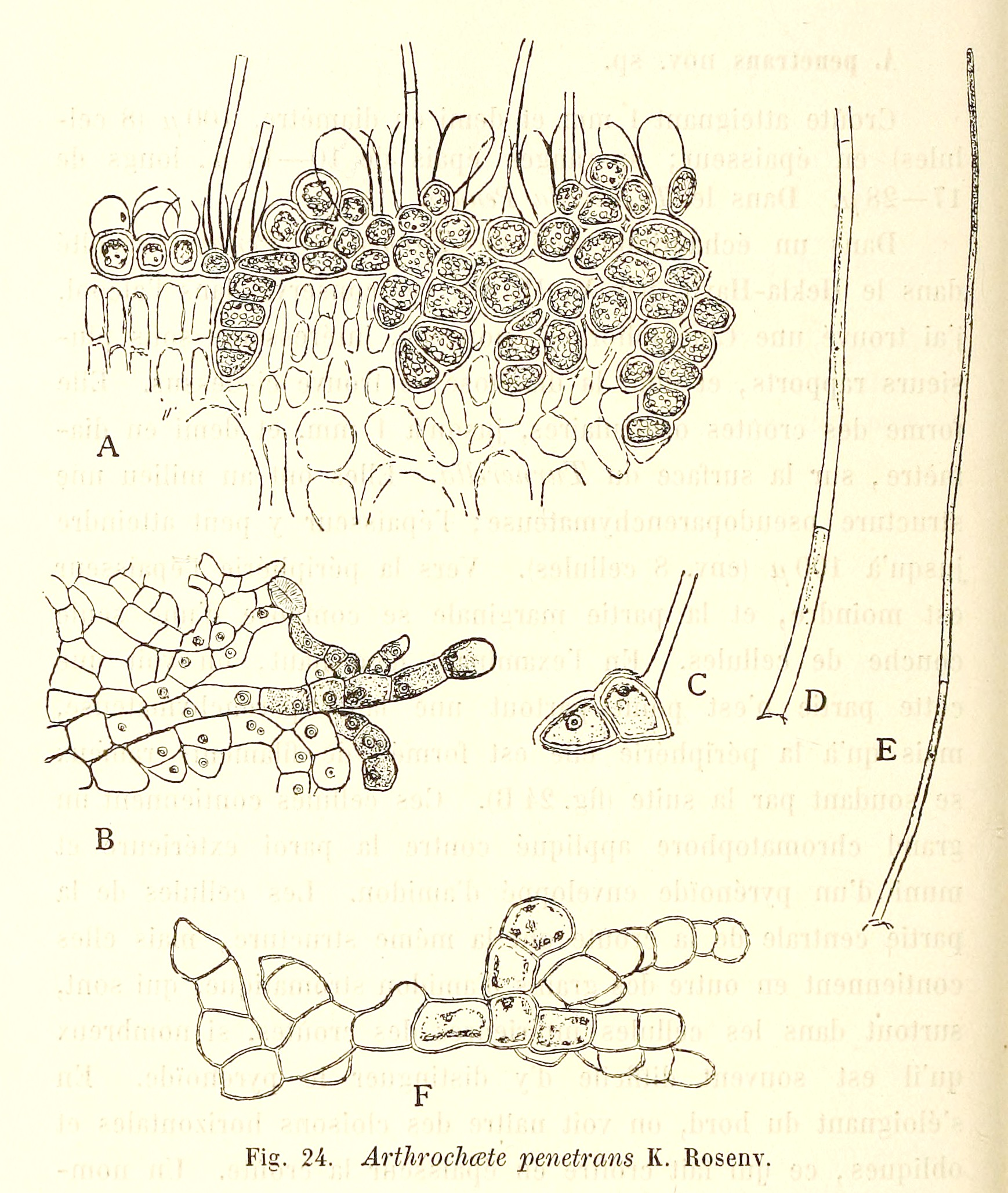

Scientific classification
- Clade: Viridiplantae
- Division: Chlorophyta
- Class: Chlorophyceae
- Order: Chaetophorales
- Family: Chaetophoraceae
- Genus: Arthrochaete; Rosenvinge
- Species: A. penetrans

Binomial name
- Arthrochaete penetrans Rosenvinge, 1898

Synonyms
- Arthrochaete phaeophila Rosenvinge

= Arthrochaete =

Genus of algae

Arthrochaete is a genus of green algae, in the family Chaetophoraceae, containing the sole species Arthrochaete penetrans.

Arthrochaete penetrans occurs is a multicellular alga which is easily distinguished due to its hairs, which are long and often numerous. Cells contain a large, plate-like chloroplast with one to two pyrenoids. It typically grows on or within marine algae, such as Turnerella, but it may also be epilithic. It is restricted to Arctic waters.
