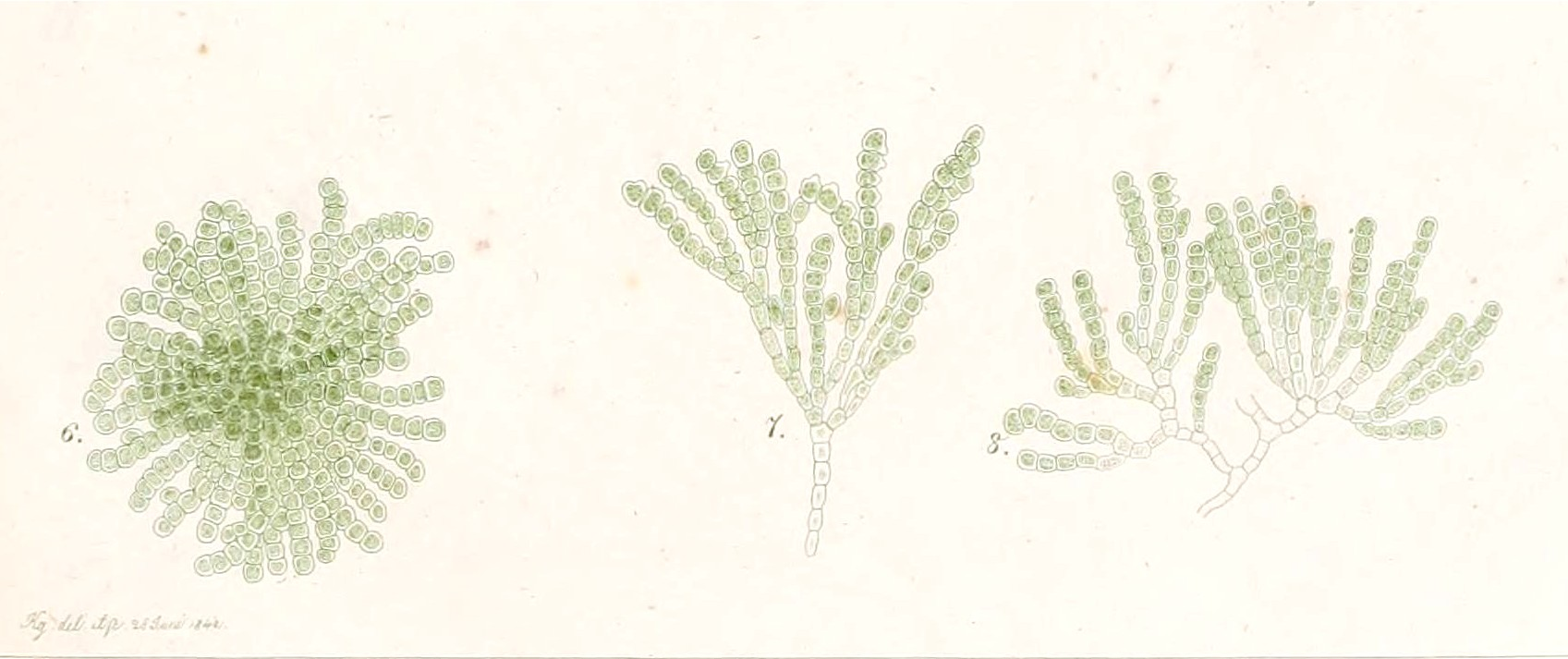
- Gongrosira viridis

Scientific classification
- Kingdom: Plantae
- Division: Chlorophyta
- Class: Chlorophyceae
- Order: Chaetophorales
- Family: Chaetophoraceae
- Genus: Gongrosira; Kützing, 1843

Type species
- Gongrosira sclerococcus Kützing, 1843

Species
- G. calcarea; G. cavernicola; G. chapmanii; G. debaryana; G. disciformis; G. ericetorum; G. fluminensis; G. gaditana; G. incrustans; G. jollyi; G. lacustris; G. leptotricha; G. onusta; G. papuasica; G. pseudoprostrata; G. schmidlei; G. sclerococcus; G. scourfieldii; G. stagnalis

= Gongrosira =

Genus of algae

Gongrosira is a genus of green algae in the family Chaetophoraceae. Species of this genus often form dense green cushions on stones, shells, or aquatic plants; rarely they are terrestrial.

Gongrosira consists of a prostrate and an erect system of filaments, attached to a substrate. The prostrate system is generally pseudoparenchymatous, and may be single- or multi-layered. The erect filaments are short and terminate in blunt tips. Cells are cylindrical, with a parietal chloroplast and one to several pyrenoids. Asexual reproduction occurs via zoospores, aplanospores or akinetes. Zoospores are biflagellate and ovoid with a stigma.

The genus Gongrosira is taxonomically problematic, because many species are distinguished based on characters that are variable and/or have significant overlap with each other, and disagreement about the taxonomic placement of some species.
