= Pilinella =

Scientific classification
- Clade: Viridiplantae
- Division: Chlorophyta
- Class: Chlorophyceae
- Order: Chaetophorales
- Family: Chaetophoraceae
- Genus: Pilinella; Hollenberg, 1971
- Species: P. californica

Binomial name
- Pilinella californica Hollenberg

Genus of algae

Pilinella is a genus of green algae in the family Chaetophoraceae, containing the sole species Pilinella californica.

Pilinella californica is epiphytic on marine brown algae, and is native to Pacific North America.
