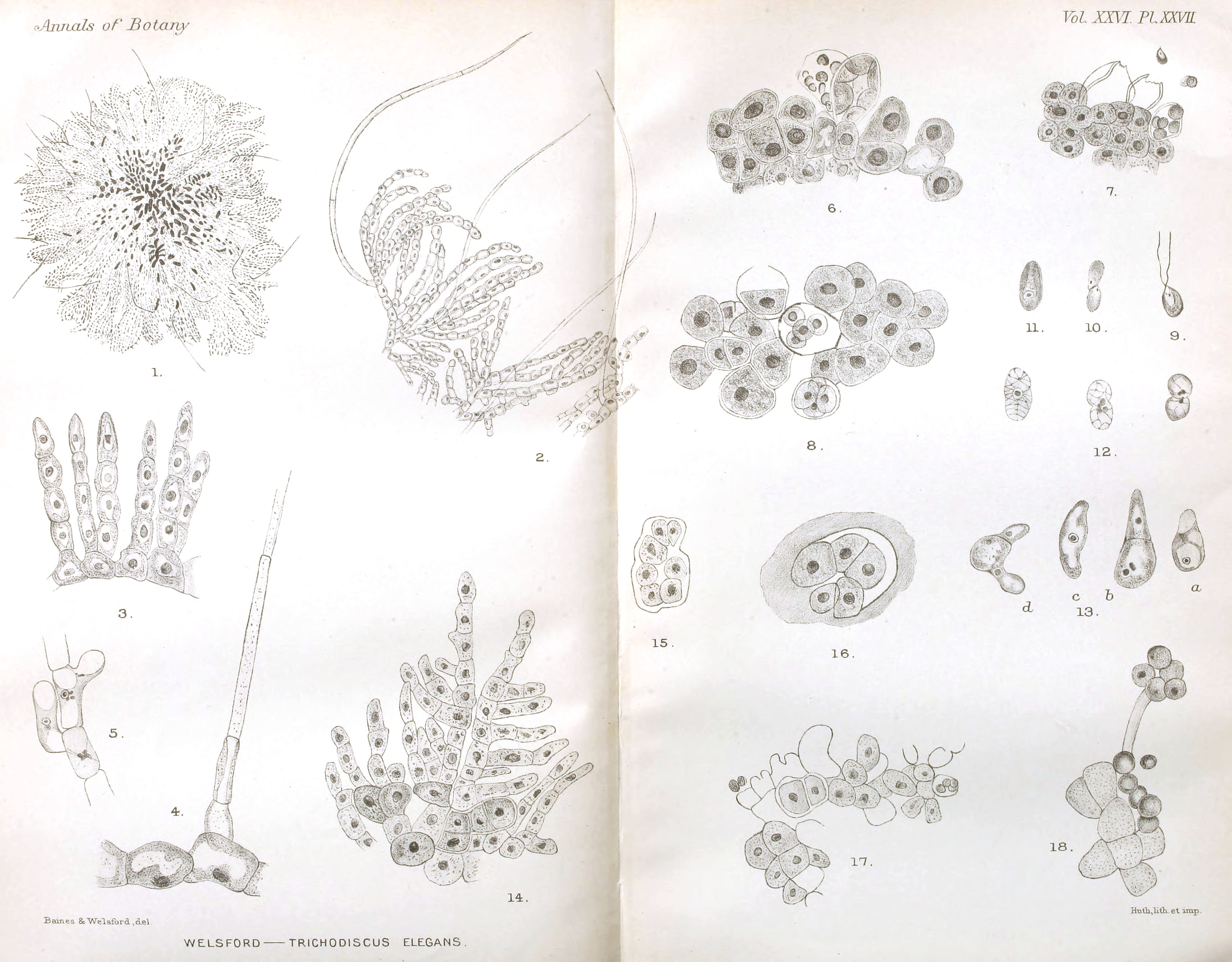

Scientific classification
- Clade: Viridiplantae
- Division: Chlorophyta
- Class: Chlorophyceae
- Order: Chaetophorales
- Family: Chaetophoraceae
- Genus: Trichodiscus; Welsford, 1912
- Species: T. elegans

Binomial name
- Trichodiscus elegans Welsford

= Trichodiscus =

Genus of algae

Trichodiscus is a genus of green algae in the family Chaetophoraceae. It contains a single species, Trichodiscus elegans. It is an epiphyte on the aquatic fern Azolla.
