= Heterotetracystis =

Scientific classification
- Clade: Viridiplantae
- Division: Chlorophyta
- Class: Chlorophyceae
- Order: incertae sedis
- Family: Tetracystaceae
- Genus: Heterotetracystis; E.R.Cox & T.R.Deason, 1968

Species
- H. akinetos; H. intermedia

Genus of algae

Heterotetracystis is a genus of green algae, specifically of the family Tetracystaceae.
