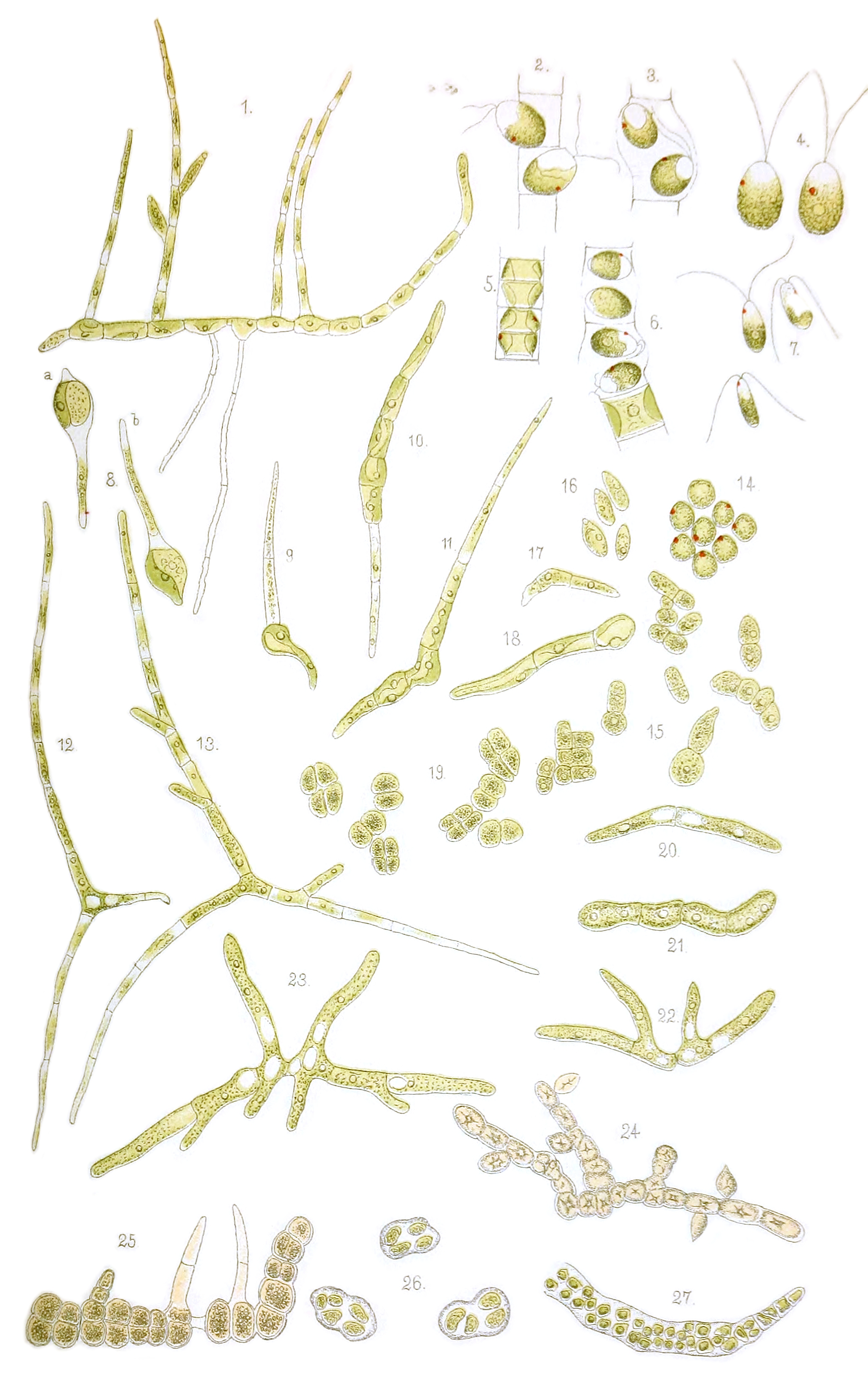
- Iwanoffia terrestris

Scientific classification
- Clade: Viridiplantae
- Division: Chlorophyta
- Class: Chlorophyceae
- Order: Chaetophorales
- Family: Chaetophoraceae
- Genus: Iwanoffia; Pascher, 1905
- Species: I. terrestris

Binomial name
- Iwanoffia terrestris (Iwanoff) Pascher

= Iwanoffia =

Genus of algae

Iwanoffia is a genus of green algae in the family Chaetophoraceae. It contains a single species, Iwanoffia terrestris, found on damp soil in the USSR.
