= Endophyton =

Scientific classification
- Clade: Viridiplantae
- Division: Chlorophyta
- Class: Chlorophyceae
- Order: Chaetophorales
- Family: Chaetophoraceae
- Genus: Endophyton; N.L. Gardner, 1909

Genus of algae

Endophyton is a genus of filamentous green algae in the family Chaetophoraceae. As its name suggests, is an endophyte of marine red and brown algae macroalgae.

Endophyton consists of uniseriate filaments that penetrate the medulla of the host alga. The filaments in the host's medulla are relatively thin, long and pale; the filaments in the host's cortex are broader, shorter and green. Filaments produce irregular branches towards the surface of the host. Cells contain a parietal, perforated chloroplast with one to few pyrenoids.

Endophyton reproduces both asexually (with quadriflagellate zoospores), or sexually (with biflagellate gametes; gametes are anisogamous).

== Species ==
The species currently recognised are:E. laurenciae and E. atroviridis.
