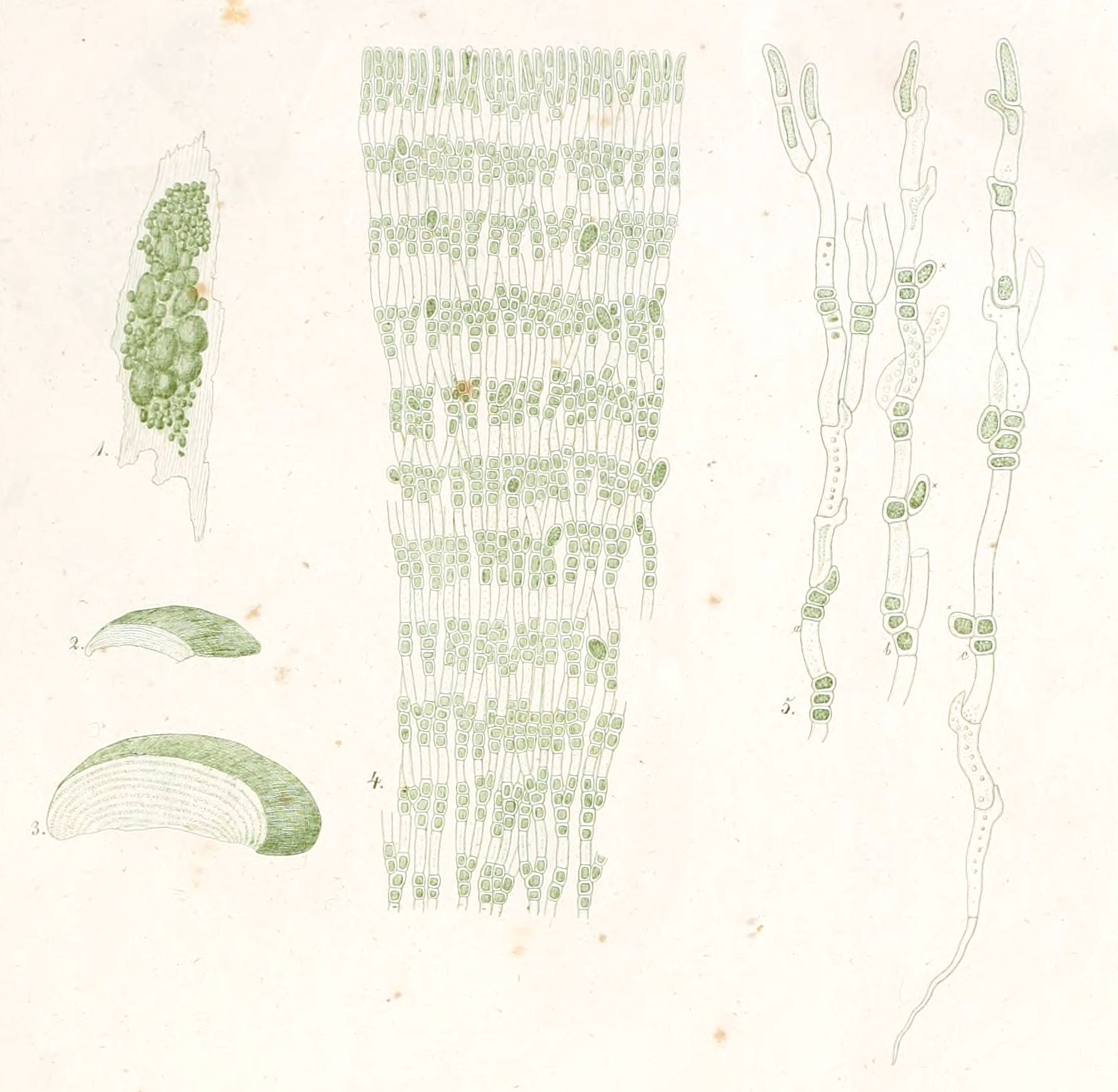
- Chlorotylium cataractarum

Scientific classification
- Kingdom: Plantae
- Division: Chlorophyta
- Class: Chlorophyceae
- Order: Chaetophorales
- Family: Chaetophoraceae
- Genus: Chlorotylium; Kützing, 1843

Type species
- Chlorotylium cataractarum Kützing, 1843

Species
- Chlorotylium cataractum

= Chlorotylium =

Genus of algae

Chlorotylium is a genus of green algae in the family Chaetophoraceae.
