= Skvortzoviothrix =

Scientific classification
- Clade: Viridiplantae
- Division: Chlorophyta
- Class: Chlorophyceae
- Order: Chaetophorales
- Family: Chaetophoraceae
- Genus: Skvortzoviothrix; Bourrelly
- Species: S. terrestris

Binomial name
- Skvortzoviothrix terrestris (Skvortsov) P.Bourrelly

Genus of algae

Skvortzoviothrix is a genus of green algae, in the family Chaetophoraceae. As of February 2022, the only species is Skvortzoviothrix terrestris.

The genus was first circumscribed by Boris V. Skvortzov in 1959 under the name Chlorodendron. Boris Vassilievich Skvortzov (1896–1980) was a Polish-Russian-Brazilian botanist (Algology and Mycology), and teacher. He also worked as a researcher in Harbin, China. However, the name was illegitimate, as it was published for a different group of algae earlier in 1900. A replacement name of Skvortzoviothrix was given by Pierre Paul Charles Bourrelly in Algues d'Eau Douce ed. 2, vol.1 on page 546 in 1972.
