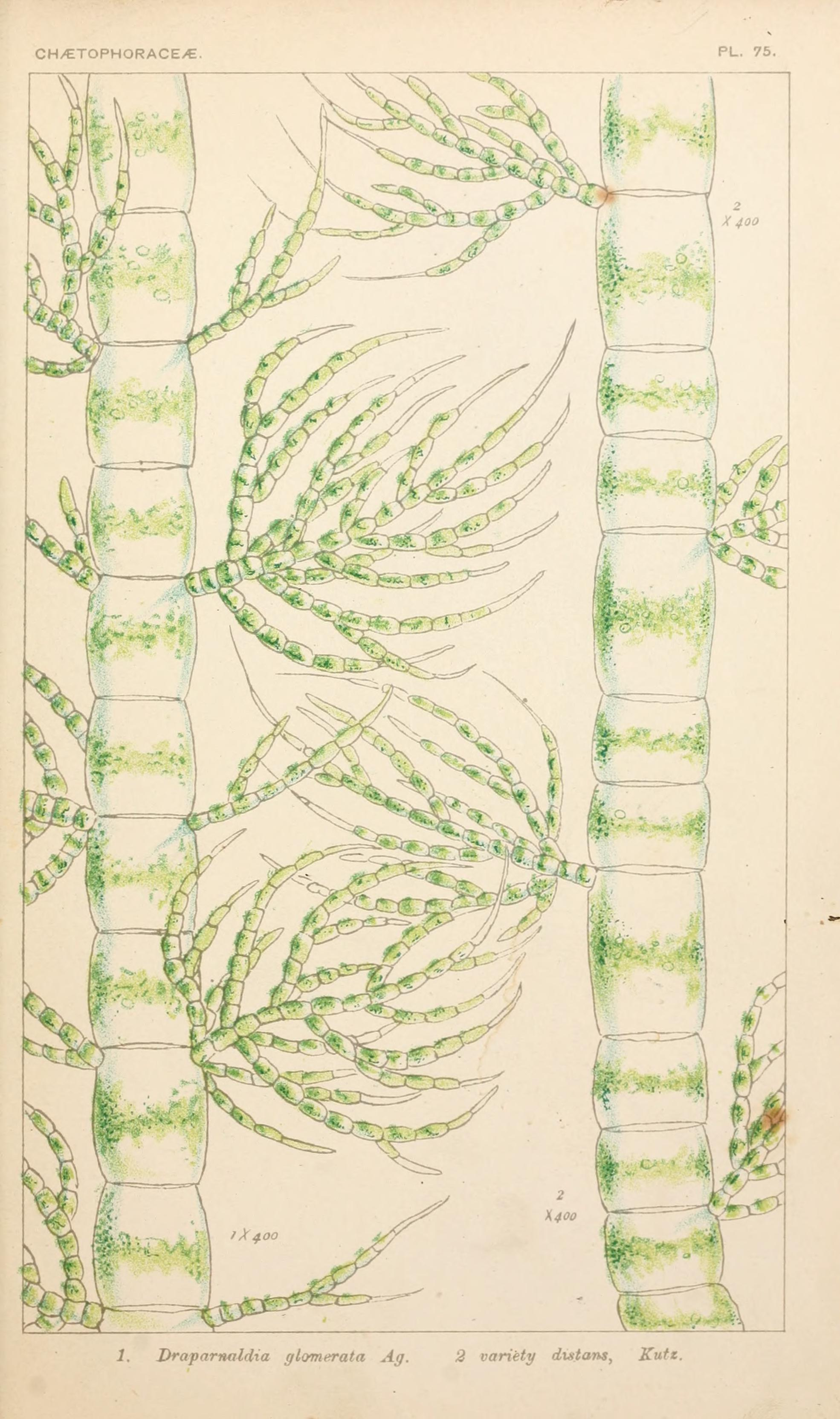
- left: Draparnaldia glomerata, right D. fluitans

Scientific classification
- Kingdom: Plantae
- Division: Chlorophyta
- Class: Chlorophyceae
- Order: Chaetophorales
- Family: Chaetophoraceae
- Genus: Draparnaldia; Bory de Saint-Vincent, 1808

Type species
- Draparnaldia mutabilis

Species
- Draparnaldia acuta; Draparnaldia elongata; Draparnaldia glomerata; Draparnaldia judayi; Draparnaldia mutabilis; Draparnaldia platyzonata

= Draparnaldia =

Genus of algae

Draparnaldia is a genus of freshwater green algae in the family Chaetophoraceae. It forms branched chains of cells, termed filaments, surrounded by mucilage. It is a cosmopolitan genus with wide distribution and it is usually found in cold aerated waters. They are either attached to sand or grow epiphytically on other aquatic plants. Draparnaldia can be seen growing in clear streams trailing on stones and boulders. Herman S. Forest of The Southern Appalachian Botanical Club has stated that while not common, it is present frequently enough to be recorded in almost all local flora lists of green algae that have been compiled. A multitude of species are present in Lake Baikal, Siberia and have been described by Meyer and Jasnitzky.

== Morphology ==
Draparnaldia consists of uniseriate filaments (chains of cells arranged in one row), which are attached to a substrate with rhizoids; the plant is surrounded by soft mucilage. The length of the main axis cells are generally equal, with some cells having side branches. Branches are borne in alternating, opposite, or whorls of tufts from the main axis. Tips of branches usually bear long, tapering hairs. Chloroplasts appear as a band within the center of each cell, and may have a smooth or reticulate margin; they have several pyrenoids.

The morphology is highly variable, being dependent upon several environmental conditions. The hairs develop through the elongation of the apical cell on the branch tips; as they elongate, the chloroplast is lost. Hair development is affected by the levels of phosphorus, nitrogen, carbon dioxide, and light. Although hair production can be suppressed under lab conditions, they are always present in the field.

=== Reproduction ===
Asexual reproduction is by zoospores, or thick-walled aplanospores. Zoospores are produced in the cells of the main axis, and are either all equally sized and biflagellate or dimorphic (two types: smaller and biflagellate or larger and quadriflagellate). Sexual reproduction has also been observed; it is isogamous with biflagellate or quadriflagellate gametes.

== Ecology ==
Draparnaldia is usually found attached to sand, sticks or rocky substrate. It can be located in streams, ditches, springs, and shallow, peaty lakes, but usually only in cold, soft flowing waters. The hairs seem to function in nutrient uptake. Under low nutrient levels, the intensity of hair formation increases. It has been demonstrated that phosphatase activity is localized to the hairs and can be induced with decreasing phosphorus levels.

== Taxonomy ==
The genus name of Draparnaldia is in honour of Jacques Philippe Raymond Draparnaud (1772–1804), who was a French naturalist, malacologist and botanist.

The genus was circumscribed by Jean-Baptiste Bory de Saint-Vincent in Ann. Mus. Natl. Hist. Nat. Vol.12 on page 399 in 1808. The type species of Draparnaldia was first placed and described in the Linnean Herbarium as Conferva mutabilis Roth in 1797. Nowadays Conferva is no longer used and the species is described as Draparnaldia mutabilis (Roth) Bory. Bory is added in honour of the researcher of the same name, based on whose description the genus was separated from similar appearing forms. Bory is accredited with the establishment of the genus.

The genus Draparnaldiopsis was formerly considered separate from Draparnaldia, but is now considered to be synonymous; species assigned to Draparnaldiopsis have alternating short and long cells constituting the main axis.
