= Diaphragma =

Scientific classification
- Clade: Viridiplantae
- Division: Chlorophyta
- Class: Chlorophyceae
- Order: Chaetophorales
- Family: Chaetophoraceae
- Genus: Diaphragma; L. Geitler, 1942

Type species
- Diaphragma radiosum

Species
- Diaphragma radiosum

Genus of algae

Diaphragma is a genus of green algae in the family Chaetophoraceae.
