= Sporocladopsis =

Scientific classification
- Kingdom: Plantae
- Division: Chlorophyta
- Class: Chlorophyceae
- Order: Chaetophorales
- Family: Chaetophoraceae
- Genus: Sporocladopsis; Nasr, 1944

Type species
- Sporocladopsis erythraea

Species
- Sporocladopsis erythraea

Genus of algae

Sporocladopsis is a genus of green algae in the family Chaetophoraceae.
