= Leptosiropsis =

Scientific classification
- Clade: Viridiplantae
- Division: Chlorophyta
- Class: Chlorophyceae
- Order: Chaetophorales
- Family: Chaetophoraceae
- Genus: Leptosiropsis; C.C.Jao
- Species: L. torulosa

Binomial name
- Leptosiropsis torulosa C.C.Jao, 1940

Genus of algae

Leptosiropsis is a genus of green algae in the family Chaetophoraceae. It contains a single species, Leptosiropsis torulosa.

Leptosiropsis torulosa is a rare alga, and has only been reported from Asia.
