= Alvikia =

Scientific classification
- Clade: Viridiplantae
- Division: Chlorophyta
- Class: Chlorophyceae
- Genus: Alvikia; Shin Watan. & L.A.Lewis 2017
- Species: A. littoralis

Binomial name
- Alvikia littoralis (Chihara, Nakayama & Inouye) Shin Watanabe & L.A.Lewis, 2017

Synonyms
- Chlorococcum littorale Chihara, Nakayama & Inouye

Genus of algae

Alvikia is a monotypic genus of green algae in the class Chlorophyceae. Its taxonomy is uncertain. It only contains the known species of Alvikia littoralis.

The genus and species were circumscribed by Shin Watanabe and Louise A. Lewis in Phycologia vol.56 (3) on pages 329–353 in 2017.

The genus name of Alvikia is in honour of Gunnar Ålvik (fl. 1934–1951), who was a Norwegian botanist (Algology) and Professor of plant physiology. He conducted research in 1936 at the University of Göttingen and later at the University of Oslo. In 1951 he received help from the Rockefeller Foundation for the building of a laboratory and greenhouse space for his department of Plant-physiology.
