= Halosarcinochlamys =

Scientific classification
- Domain: Eukaryota
- Kingdom: Viridiplantae
- Division: Chlorophyta
- Class: Chlorophyceae
- Order: Chlamydomonadales
- Family: Chlamydomonadaceae
- Genus: Halosarcinochlamys

Species
- Halosarcinochlamys cherokeensis

Genus of algae

Halosarcinochlamys is a genus of green algae in the family Chlamydomonadaceae according to the National Center for Biotechnology Information (NCBI). No such genus is listed by AlgaeBase.
