= Lobosphaeropsis =

Scientific classification
- Clade: Viridiplantae
- Division: Chlorophyta
- Class: Chlorophyceae
- Order: Chlamydomonadales
- Family: incertae sedis
- Genus: Lobosphaeropsis; Reisigl

Species
- Lobosphaeropsis lobophora

Genus of algae

Lobosphaeropsis is a genus of green algae, specifically of the order Chlamydomonadales.
