= Bicuspidella =

Scientific classification
- Clade: Viridiplantae
- Division: Chlorophyta
- Class: Chlorophyceae
- Order: incertae sedis
- Family: incertae sedis
- Genus: Bicuspidella; Pascher, 1932

Type species
- Bicuspidella incus

Species
- Bicuspidella incus Pascher; Bicuspidella rostrum-aquilae Pascher; Bicuspidella sessilis Fott

Genus of algae

Bicuspidella is a genus of green algae in the class Chlorophyceae. Its taxonomy is uncertain.
