= Nayalia =

Scientific classification
- Clade: Viridiplantae
- Division: Chlorophyta
- Class: Chlorophyceae
- Order: Chaetophorales
- Family: Chaetophoraceae
- Genus: Nayalia; P.C.Silva, 1959
- Species: N. terrestris

Binomial name
- Nayalia terrestris (Nayal) P.C.Silva

Genus of algae

Nayalia is a genus of green algae in the family Chaetophoraceae, containing the sole species Nayalia terrestris.

The genus name of Nayalia is in honour of A.A. Nayal, who was an Egyptian botanist from the Department of Botany at Cairo University.

The genus was circumscribed by Paul Claude Silva in Taxon vol.8 on page 63 in 1959.
