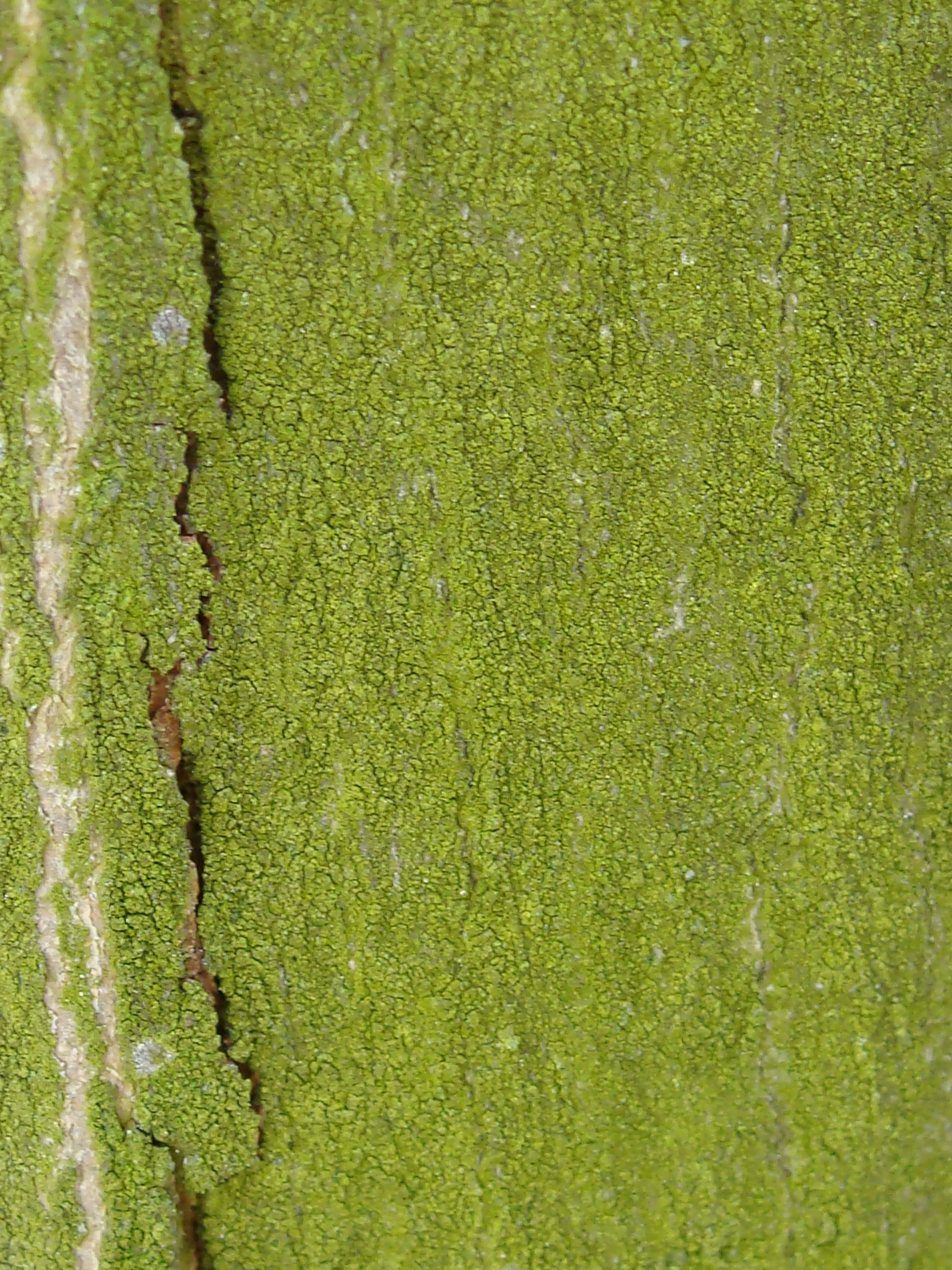

Scientific classification
- Kingdom: Plantae
- Division: Chlorophyta
- Class: Chlorophyceae
- Order: Chaetophorales
- Family: Chaetophoraceae
- Genus: Pleurococcus; Meneghini

Species
- See text

= Pleurococcus =

Genus of algae

Pleurococcus is a genus of green algae in the family Chaetophoraceae that are spherical in shape with a thick cell wall to protect themselves against excessive water loss. They can be found alone or in bunches together forming a slimy layer and grow on moist, dark patches of trees, rocks and soil.

The name is derived from the Greek terms πλευρά (pleurá, "side" or "rib"), and κόκκος (kókkos, "seed" or "berry"). It is sometimes also called Protococcus. Its taxonomic status needs reinvestigation, since the type species Pleurococcus vulgaris is considered a synonym of Desmococcus olivaceus.

== Species ==
The genus consists of the following species:

- Pleurococcus angulosus
- Pleurococcus magnum
- Pleurococcus mucosus
- Pleurococcus rufescens
- Pleurococcus vulgaris
