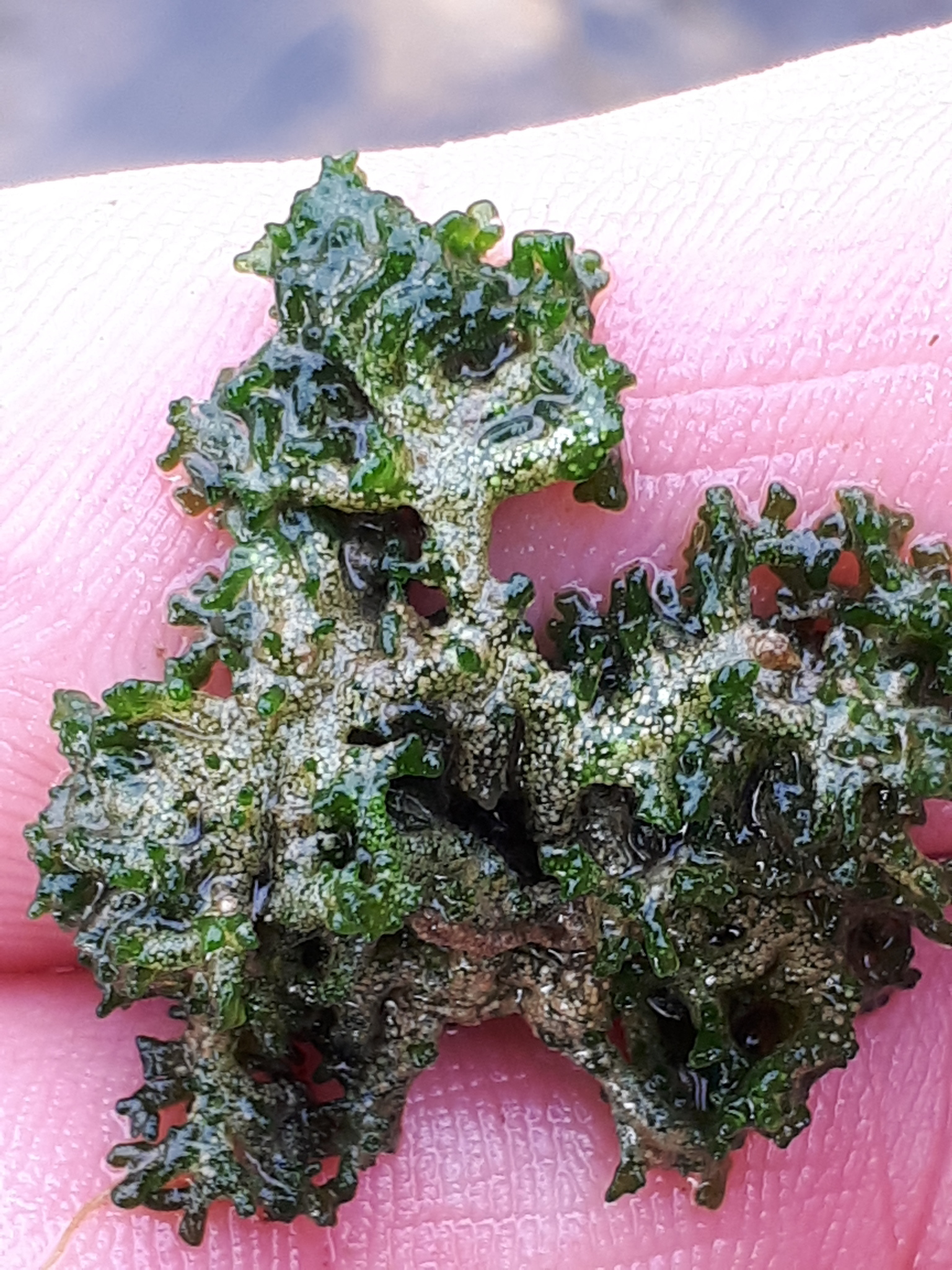
- Macroscopic view of Chaetophora lobata

Scientific classification
- Kingdom: Plantae
- Division: Chlorophyta
- Class: Chlorophyceae
- Order: Chaetophorales
- Family: Chaetophoraceae
- Genus: Chaetophora; F. Schrank, 1783

Type species
- Chaetophora lobata Schrank, 1783

Species
- Chaetophora dilatata Hassall; Chaetophora draparnaldioides Kützing; Chaetophora flagellifera Kützing; Chaetophora indica Martens; Chaetophora lobata Schrank; Chaetophora oblongum Fukushima; Chaetophora punctiformis Kützing; Chaetophora tuberculosa (Roth) C.Agardh

= Chaetophora (alga) =

Genus of algae

Chaetophora is a genus of green algae in the family Chaetophoraceae. It has a cosmopolitan distribution. It is found on aquatic plants or other submerged surfaces in still or moving freshwater. Many species seem to prefer colder waters, being more abundant during the winter and spring months.

== Description ==
Chaetophora consists of tuberculose or arbuscular thalli of a mucilaginous or cartilaginous texture. The prostrate part of the thallus is little developed, while the erect part consists of uniseriate filaments, which are highly branched and intertwined; each filament ends in a blunt point or tapers to a long, multicellular hair. Cells contain a single parietal chloroplast with one to several pyrenoids.

Both asexual and sexual reproduction are known. In asexual reproduction, zoospores are quadriflagellate (with four flagella); sexual reproduction is isogamous with biflagellate (2-flagellate) gametes. Both are produced in peripheral cells. Chaetophora can also produce akinetes in the peripheral cells, which are brown in color.

== Taxonomy ==
The genus Chaetophora is problematic, since species delimitation has traditionally relied on unreliable characteristics such as the general shape of the filaments and cells and mucilage. Additionally, prior to 2019, the genus was polyphyletic. The similar genus Chaetophoropsis was split off from Chaetophora sensu stricto in 2019 to include species that form globose thalli.
