= Ettlia =

Scientific classification
- Clade: Viridiplantae
- Division: Chlorophyta
- Class: Chlorophyceae
- Order: Chlamydomonadales
- Family: incertae sedis
- Genus: Ettlia; Komárek, 1989

Species
- Ettlia carotinosa J.Komárek; Ettlia cohaerens (R.D.Groover & Bold) H.Ettl & G.Gärtner; Ettlia fusispora (G.Arce & Bold) Ettl & G.Gärtner; Ettlia minuta (G.Arce & Bold) J.Komárek; Ettlia oleoabundans (S.Chantanachat & Bold) J.Komárek; Ettlia texensis (P.A.Archibald) J.Komárek

Genus of algae

Ettlia is a genus of green algae, in the order Chlamydomonadales.
