= Thamniochloris =

Scientific classification
- Kingdom: Plantae
- Division: Chlorophyta
- Class: Chlorophyceae
- Order: Chaetophorales
- Family: Chaetophoraceae
- Genus: Thamniochloris; P. Dangeard

Species
- Thamniochloris atroviridis; Thamniochloris ochlochaetoides; Thamniochloris variabilis

Genus of algae

Thamniochloris is a genus of green algae in the family Chaetophoraceae.
