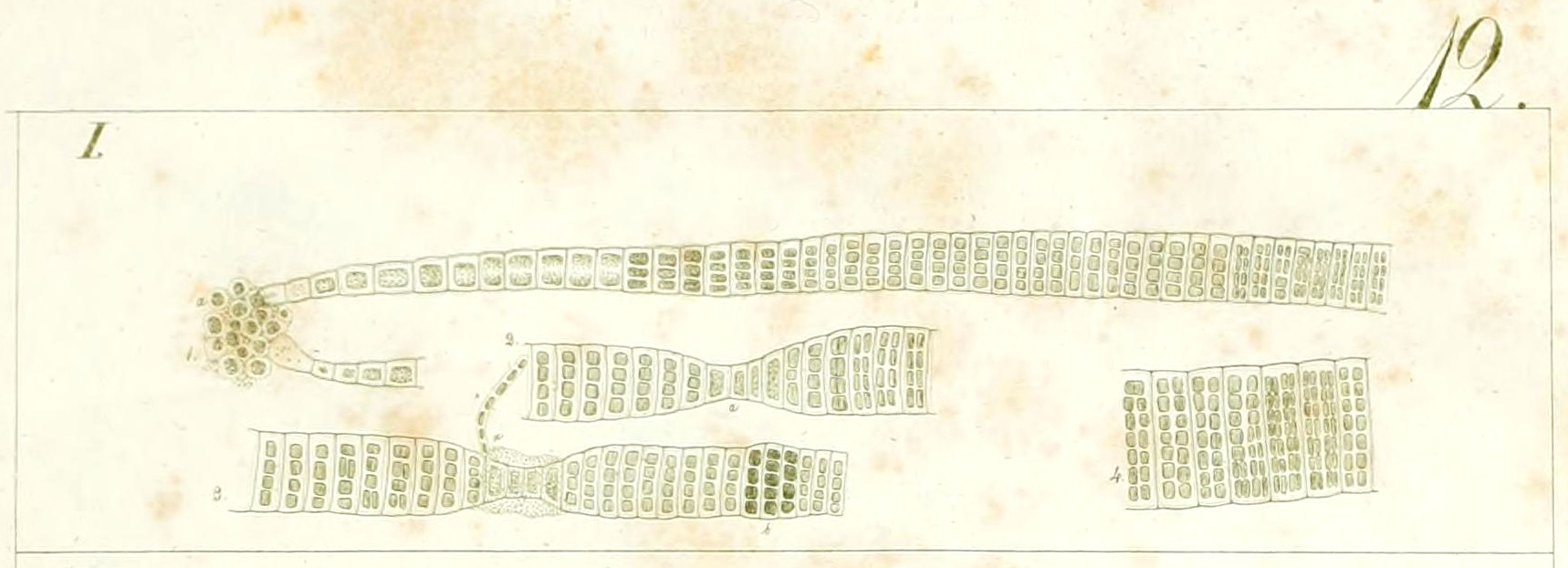
- Schizomeris leibleinii

Scientific classification
- Kingdom: Plantae
- Division: Chlorophyta
- Class: Chlorophyceae
- Order: Chaetophorales
- Family: Schizomeridaceae
- Genus: Schizomeris; Kützing

Species
- Schizomeris leibleinii

= Schizomeris =

Genus of algae

Schizomeris is a genus of green algae in the family Schizomeridaceae.
