= Chlorococcopsis =

Scientific classification
- Clade: Viridiplantae
- Division: Chlorophyta
- Class: Chlorophyceae
- Order: Chlamydomonadales
- Family: Chlorococcaceae
- Genus: Chlorococcopsis; S.Watanabe & G.L.Floyd

Species
- Chlorococcopsis wimmeri (F.W.Hilse) Shin Watanabe & G.L.Floyd

Genus of algae

Chlorococcopsis is a genus of green algae, specifically of the Chlorococcaceae. As of February 2022, AlgaeBase accepted only one species, Chlorococcopsis wimmeri, of "uncertain taxonomic status".
