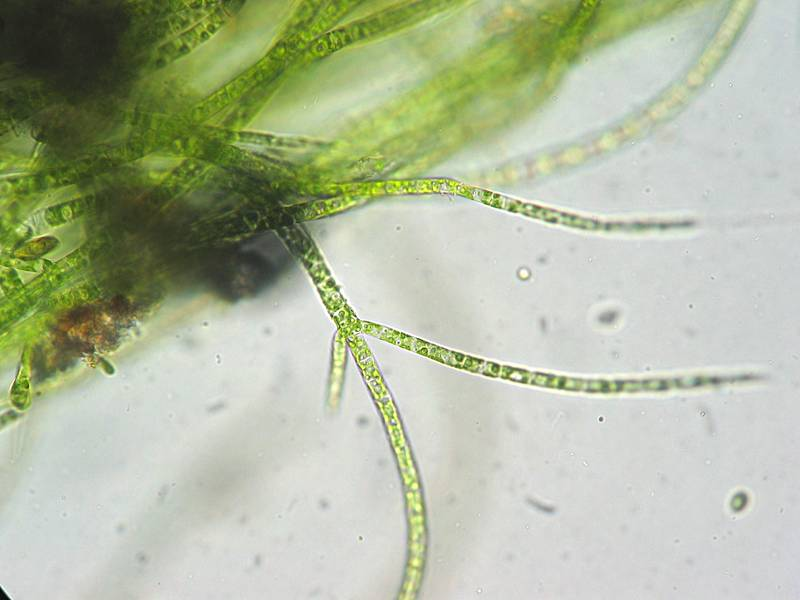
- Stigeoclonium sp.

Scientific classification
- Kingdom: Plantae
- Division: Chlorophyta
- Class: Chlorophyceae
- Order: Chaetophorales
- Family: Chaetophoraceae
- Genus: Stigeoclonium; Kützing, 1843

Type species
- Stigeoclonium tenue Kützing 1843

Species
- See text

= Stigeoclonium =

Genus of algae

Stigeoclonium is a genus of green algae in the family Chaetophoraceae. It is a common freshwater genus, found growing attached to various substrates; it has a cosmopolitan distribution.

There are currently 53 accepted species within this group. However, recent phylogenetics have identified that this group is polyphyletic and will need reassessment.

The holotype for this genus is S. tenue, described in 1843 by F.T. Kützing. It was first described in 1814 by Carl Agardh under the basionym Draparnaldia tenuis. The name Stigeoclonium has been conserved against the genus Myxonema named by Elias Magnus Fries; Myxonema is a heterogeneous assemblage of various algae.

== Description ==
Stigeoclonium consists of two systems of filaments, prostrate and erect filaments. Prostrate filaments are attached to the substrate and are creeping or rhizoidal, occasionally forming a pseudoparenchymatous mass. Erect filaments emerge from the prostrate filaments, and are variously branched. The erect filaments terminate in an obtuse or acutely pointed tip, or a long multicellular hair. Under unfavorable conditions, a "stunted" form develops with predominantly prostrate filaments. Cells are uninucleate, cylindrical or swollen, with a single parietal chloroplast and one to several pyrenoids. The whole thallus is commonly surrounded by a layer of mucilage.

Reproduction occurs asexually and sexual reproduction. Asexual reproduction occurs by zoospores of two sizes, large and small (macrozoospores and microzoospores), both of which have four flagella. Sexual reproduction is isogamous and involves biflagellate or quadriflagellate gametes. Both zoospores and gametes are termed "swarmers", and are formed mostly in the erect filaments. They escape through a lateral pore in the cell wall. Zoospores swim for some time, then attach to a substrate via their anterior (flagellar) end, withdraw their flagella, and germinate. Mature zygotes are orange to red in color.

== Ecology ==
Stigeoclonium is almost exclusively found in freshwater, although some species are also found in brackish waters. It is distributed worldwide and can be found in a variety of habitats, from under ice to in hot springs. Typically, they are found in streams, rivers, lakes, and other bodies of water where they are attached to various surfaces such as stones, wood, and leaves. Some forms are also epizoic on the surface of animals, such as snail shells, kissing gourami, and even toads.

Stigeoclonium can be found in a wide pH range, but its autecology is overall rather poorly known.

== Taxonomy ==
The taxonomy of Stigeoclonium is currently poorly known. Traditionally, morphological characters used to delimit species include the cell dimensions, branching degree, presence/absence of hairs, thallus color and habitat. These characters have long been known to be variable; for example, hair presence is known to be affected by light and nutrient levels. Consequently, many authors have merged most of the species under just a few names.

Studies based on molecular phylogenetics have shown that Stigeoclonium is polyphyletic, and the clades are not characterized by traditional morphological characters, but instead the morphology of the germling after it germinates from the zoospore. Stigeoclonium helveticum was shown to be within the clade of Chaetophoraceae, and was reclassified into a new genus, Pseudostigeoclonium.

=== Species list ===
As of 2025, AlgaeBase includes the following species:

- S. aestivale
- S. amoenum
- S. attenuatum
- S. australense
- S. bertholdianum
- S. biasolettianum
- S. bifurcatum
- S. carolinianum
- S. chroolepiforme
- S. condensatum
- S. curvirostrum
- S. elongatum
- S. falklandicum
- S. farctum
- S. fasciculare
- S. flagelliferum
- S. fritschianum
- S. gayanum
- S. geraldii
- S. gracile
- S. islamii
- S. klebsii
- S. longipilum
- S. lubricum
- S. mejeri
- S. nanum
- S. nelsonii
- S. nudiusculum
- S. ovisporum
- S. pachydermum
- S. penicillatum
- S. polymorphum
- S. prolixum
- S. pusillum
- S. rivulare
- S. sarmae
- S. segarare
- S. setigerum
- S. stagnatile
- S. subsecundum
- S. subspinosum
- S. subuligerum
- S. tenue
- S. thermale
- S. tibeticum
- S. variabile
- S. westii
