= Chlororustica =

Scientific classification
- Clade: Viridiplantae
- Division: Chlorophyta
- Class: Chlorophyceae
- Order: Sphaeropleales
- Family: Radiococcaceae
- Genus: Chlororustica
- Species: C. terrestris

Binomial name
- Chlororustica terrestris (Herndon) Shin Watanabe, N.Mezaki & Tatsuya Suzuki

Synonyms
- Ettlia terrestris; Neochloris terrestris

Species of alga

Chlororustica is a genus of green algae, in the family Chlorococcaceae. Its sole species is Chlororustica terrestris, synonym Ettlia terrestris, a fresh-water alga which grows on rocks or in soil, and has been identified in the Arctic, Tajikistan, Europe and Jamaica.
