= Pleurastrum =

Scientific classification
- Clade: Viridiplantae
- Division: Chlorophyta
- Class: Chlorophyceae
- Order: Chlamydomonadales
- Family: Pleurastraceae; K.R.Mattox & K.D.Stewart
- Genus: Pleurastrum; Chodat

Species
- See text.

Genus of algae

Pleurastrum is a genus of green algae, specifically of the Chlorophyceae. As of February 2022, it was the only genus in the family Pleurastraceae.

== Species ==
As of February 2022, AlgaeBase accepted the following species:

- Pleurastrum insigne Chodat
- Pleurastrum photoheterotrophicum Metting
- Pleurastrum sarcinoideum Groover & H.C.Bold
- Pleurastrum terricola (Bristol) D.M.John
