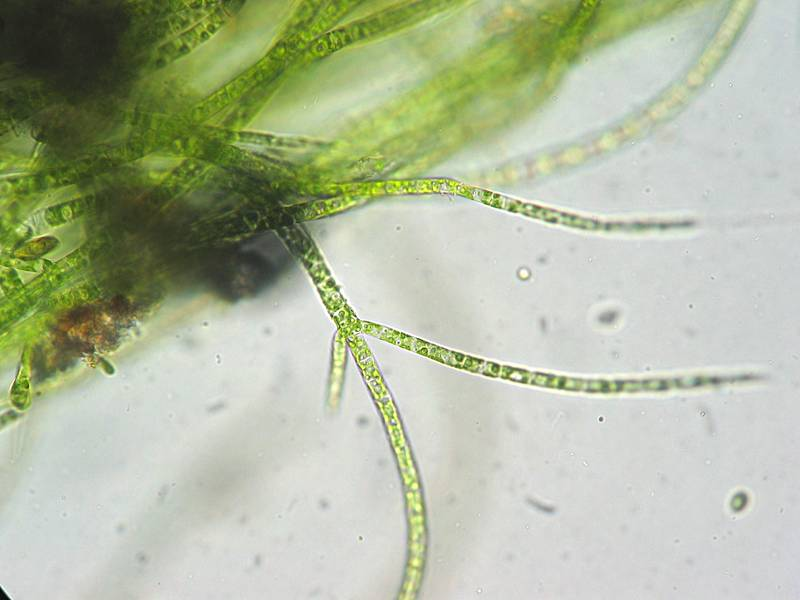

Scientific classification
- Kingdom: Plantae
- Division: Chlorophyta
- Class: Chlorophyceae
- Order: Chaetophorales
- Family: Chaetophoraceae; Greville, 1824

Genera
- See text

= Chaetophoraceae =

Family of algae

Chaetophoraceae is a family of green algae in the order Chaetophorales.

Members of the family are variously semi-terrestrial to aquatic in habitat, and consist of branched filaments in two parts, a prostrate system of filaments and an erect system of filaments. During germination, the zoospore is erect and divides parallel to the substrate. The prostrate system develops from successive divisions of the original zoospore cell, and consists of filaments with square cells attached to the surface, or long thin rhizoids which penetrate the surface. The erect system consists of one, two or several erect branched filaments, sometimes terminating in long hairs.

== Genera ==
- Arthrochaete
- Caespitella
- Cedercreutziella
- Chaetomnion
- Chaetonemopsis
- Chaetophora
- Chaetophoropsis
- Chloroclonium
- Chlorotylium
- Choreoclonium
- Crenacantha
- Diaphragma
- Didymosporangium
- Draparnaldia
- Draparnaldioides
- Elaterodiscus
- Endoclonium
- Endophyton
- Entodictyon
- Epibolium
- Gloeoplax
- Gongrosira
- Gongrosirella
- Hormotila
- Hydraeophycus
- Ireksokonia
- Iwanoffia
- Jaagiella
- Klebahniella
- Kymatotrichon
- Leptosiropsis
- Lochmiopsis
- Myxonema
- Myxonemopsis
- Nayalia
- Periplegmatium
- Pilinella
- Pleurangium
- Pleurococcus
- Pseudochaete
- Skvortzoviothrix
- Sporocladopsis
- Stigeoclonium
- Streptochlora
- Thamniochloris
- Thamniolum
- Trichodiscus
- Tumulofilum
- Uvulifera
- Zoddaea
- Zygomitus

=== Formerly included genera ===
- Cloniophora
- Trichophilus
