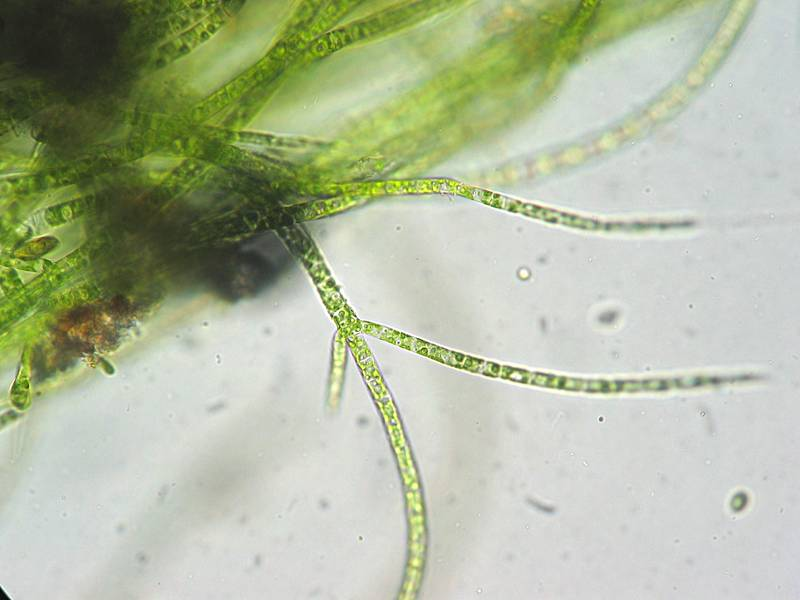
- Stigeoclonium sp.

Scientific classification
- Kingdom: Plantae
- Division: Chlorophyta
- Class: Chlorophyceae
- Order: Chaetophorales; Wille

Families
- See text

= Chaetophorales =

Order of algae

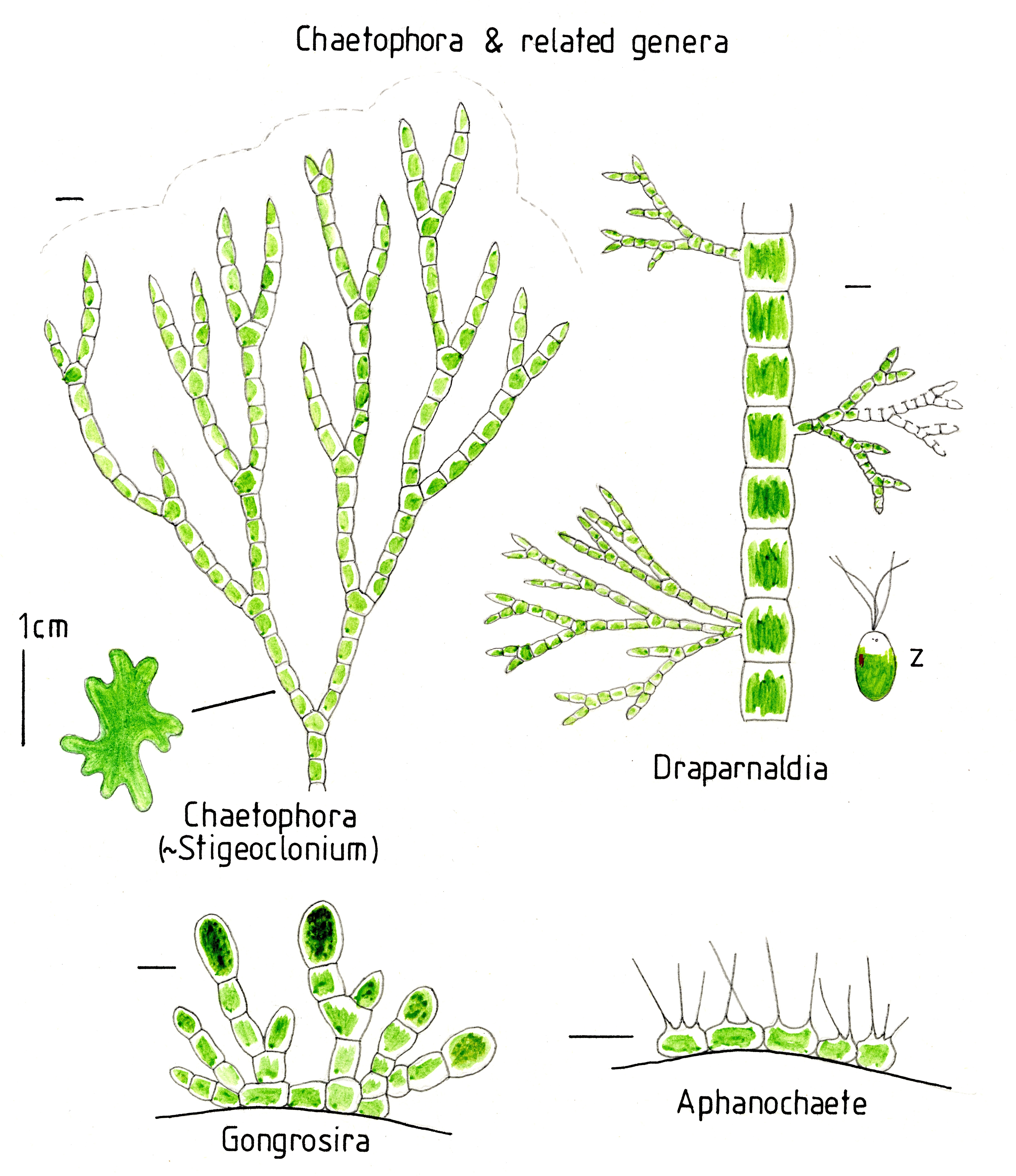
Illustration of some Chaetophorales

Chaetophorales is an order of green algae in the class Chlorophyceae. Algae in the order Chaetophorales consist of filamentous, branched algae. The thalli have two parts, a prostrate and upright section, and the filaments are variously branched. The algae are found in freshwater habitats or terrestrial habitats.

== Families ==
Chaetophorales consists of the following families:

- Aphanochaetaceae Oltmanns
- Barrancaceae Caisová et al.
- Chaetophoraceae Greville
- Fritschiellaceae Caisová & Melkonian
- Schizomeridaceae G.M.Smith
- Uronemataceae Caisová et al.

Phylogenetic relationships within the order are as follows:

- - Schizomeridaceae
  - - Aphanochaetaceae
    - - Barrancaceae
      - - Uronemataceae
        - - Fritschiellaceae
          - Chaetophoraceae
