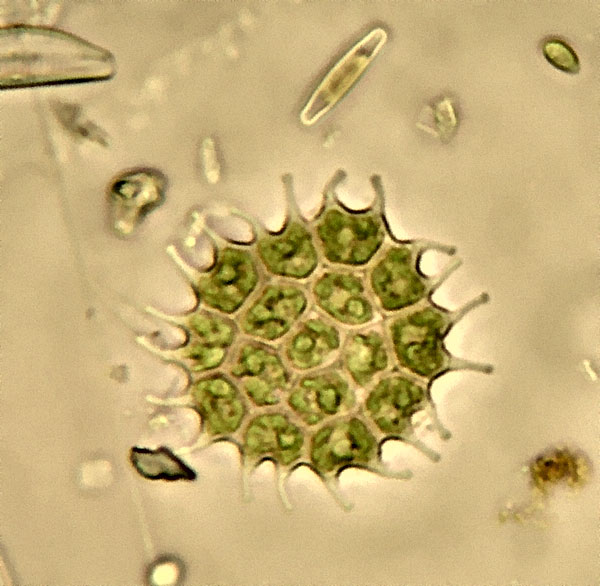
- Light micrograph of Pediastrum sp.

Scientific classification
- Kingdom: Plantae
- Division: Chlorophyta
- Subphylum: Chlorophytina
- Class: Chlorophyceae; Wille in Warming, 1884

Orders
- See text.

= Chlorophyceae =

Class of green algae

The Chlorophyceae, also known as chlorophycean algae, are one of the classes of green algae, within the phylum Chlorophyta. They are a large assemblage of mostly freshwater and terrestrial organisms; many members are important primary producers in the ecosystems they inhabit. Their body plans are diverse and range from single flagellated or non-flagellated cells to colonies or filaments of cells. The class Chlorophyceae has been distinguished on the basis of ultrastructural morphology; molecular traits are also being used to classify taxa within the class.

== Description ==
Chlorophycean algae are eukaryotic organisms composed of cells which occur in a variety of forms. Depending on the species, Chlorophyceae can grow unicellular (e.g. Chlamydomonas), colonial (e.g. Volvox), coenocytic (e.g. Characiosiphon), or filamentous (e.g. Chaetophora). In their vegetative state, some members have flagella while others produce them only in reproductive stages; still others never produce flagella.

=== Chloroplasts ===
Chlorophycean algae have chloroplasts and nearly all members are photosynthetic. There are a few exceptions, such as Polytoma, which have plastids that have lost the ability to photosynthesize. They are usually green due to the presence of chlorophyll a and b; they can also contain the pigment beta-carotene. Chloroplasts are diverse in morphology and include many forms, including, cup-shaped (e.g. Chlamydomonas), or axial, or parietal and reticulate (e.g. Oedogonium).

In many species, there may be one or more storage bodies called pyrenoids (central proteinaceous body covered with a starch sheath) that are localised around the chloroplast. Some algae may also store food in the form of oil droplets. The inner cell wall layer is made of cellulose and the outer layer of pectose.

=== Ultrastructure ===
Cells of Chlorophyceae usually have two or four flagella, but in some cases may have numerous flagella. The flagella emerge from the apex of the cell, and are connected to the nucleus via rhizoplasts. The arrangement of flagella may be in one of two configurations, termed CW ("clockwise") or DO ("directly opposed"). In the CW configuration, the basal bodies are arranged clockwise in the 1–7 o'clock position. In the DO configuration, the basal bodies are arranged in 12–6 o'clock. Taxa with the CW arrangement and DO arrangement correspond to two different clades, roughly corresponding to the orders Chlamydomonadales and Sphaeropleales, respectively.

A combination of ultrastructural features are characteristic of the Chlorophyceae. These include: closed mitosis, the telophase spindle collapsing before cytokinesis, and a system of microtubules called a phycoplast running parallel to the plane of cytokinesis.

Diversity of Chlorophyceae
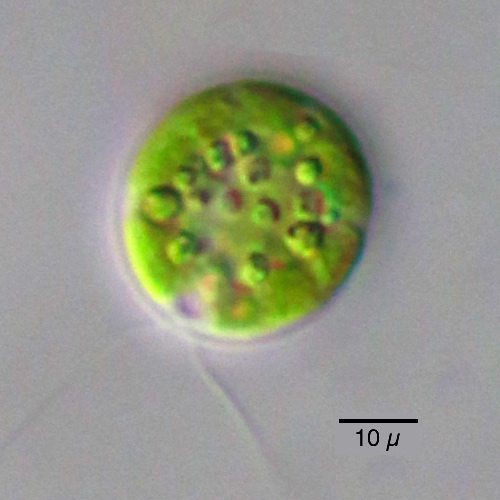
Chlamydomonas globosa 400x

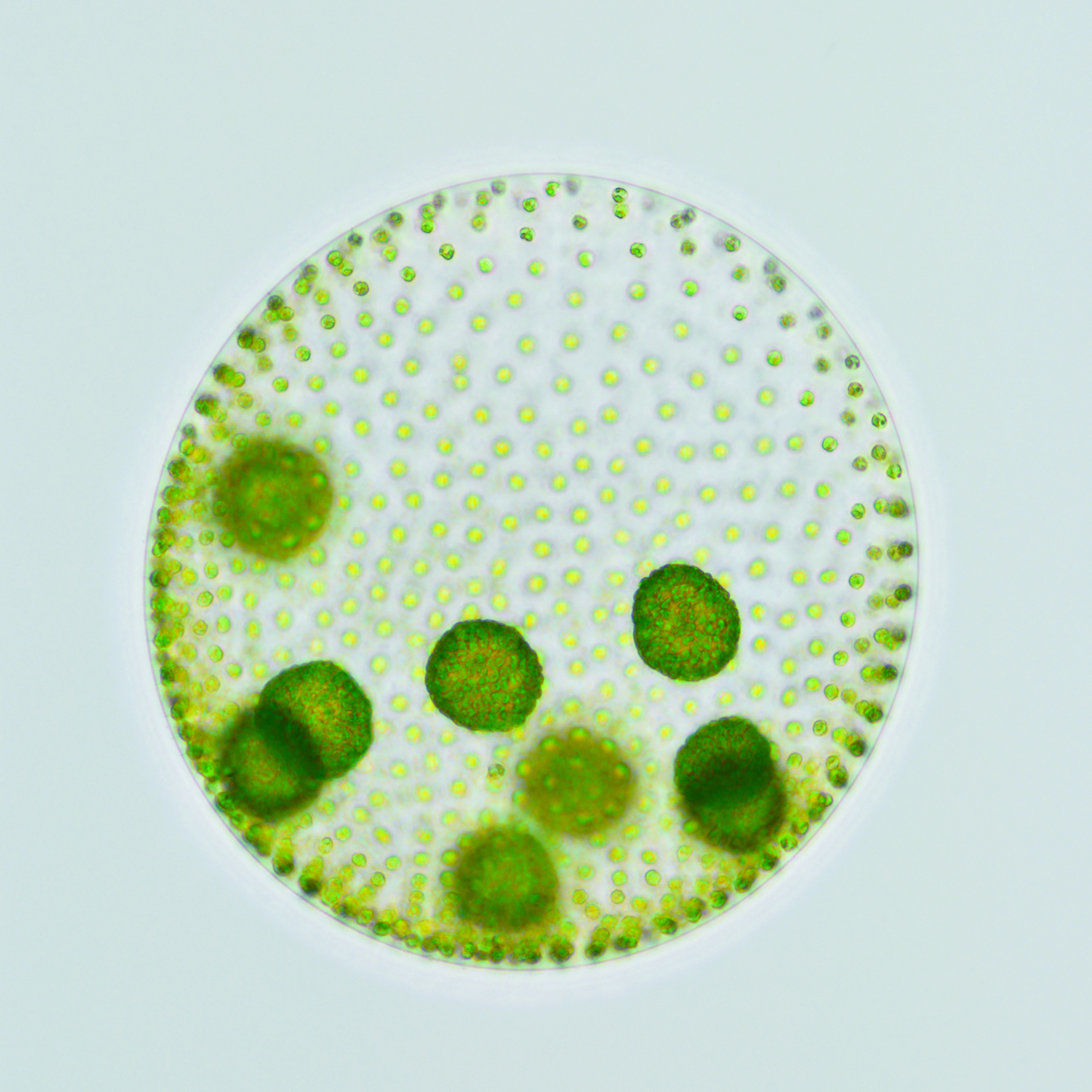
Volvox aureus

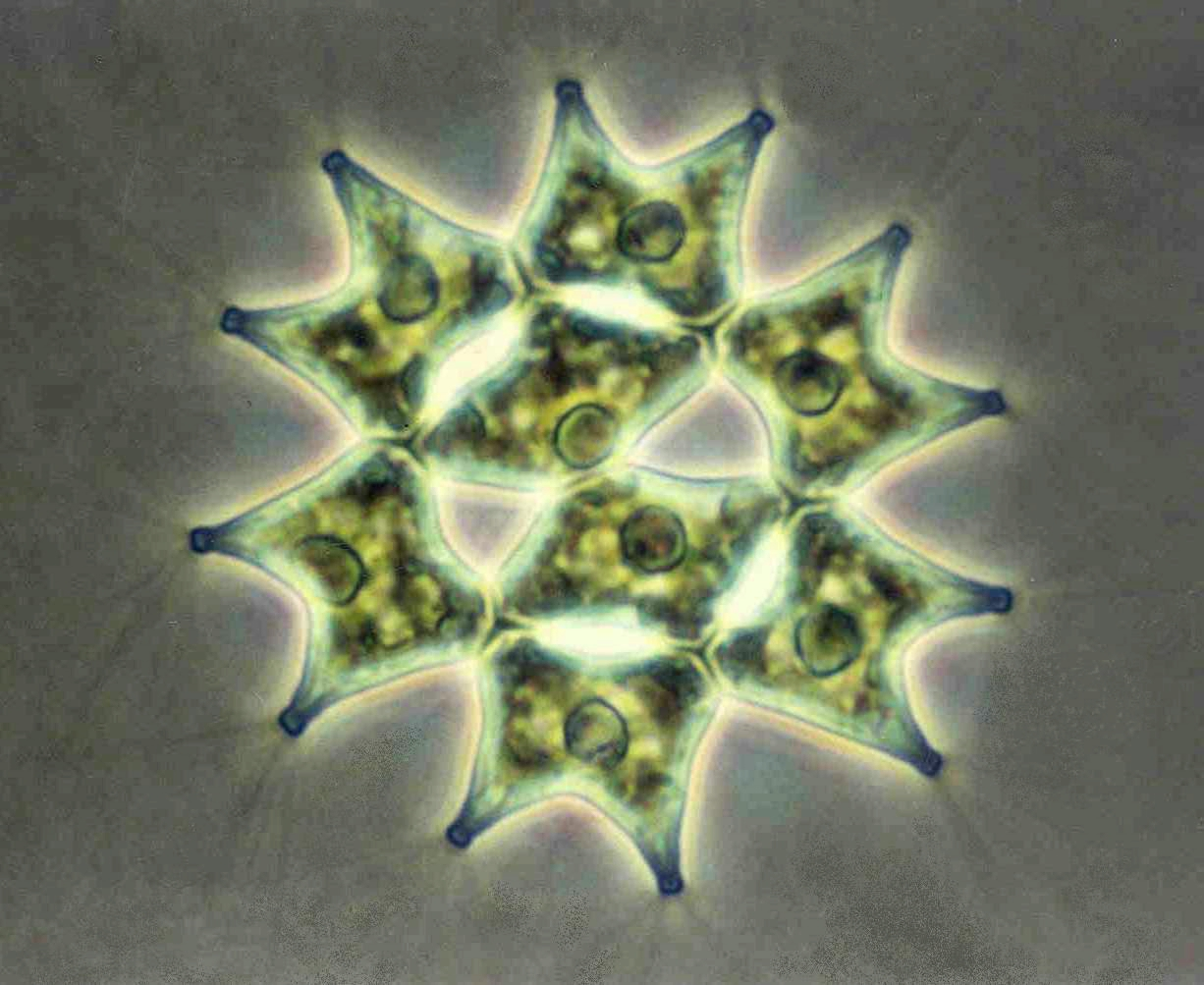
Pediastrum duplex

== Reproduction ==
Chlorophyceae can reproduce both asexually and sexually. In asexual reproduction, cells may produce autospores, aplanospores or zoospores. Autospores (by definition) lack flagella and appear as smaller versions of vegetative cells. Zoospores typically have an elongate, hydrodynamic shape and often have eyespots. Aplanospores are similar to zoospores in that they have characteristics typical of zoospores (such as contractile vacuoles), but lack flagella.

In addition to normal asexual reproduction, some genera such as Chlamydomonas and Dunaliella can go through a temporary phase known as the "palmella stage", in which flagella are absent and the cells divide vegetatively within a common mucilaginous envelope. Algae enter the palmella stage in response to stressful conditions, such as changes in salinity or predation. Additionally, Haematococcus produces resistant stages with thick cell walls, termed akinetes.

Sexual reproduction shows considerable variation in the type and formation of sex cells; it may be isogamous (with two morphologically identical gamete types), anisogamous (with two morphologically distinct gamete types), and oogamous (with larger, nonmotile eggs and smaller motile sperm cells). Members of Chlorophyceae that undergo sexual reproduction have a zygotic life cycle, in which the zygotes are the only diploid stages. Zygotes may have thick and/or spiny cell walls; these are called hypnozygotes and they also function as resting stages.

They share many similarities with higher plants, including the presence of asymmetrical flagellated cells, the breakdown of the nuclear envelope at mitosis, and the presence of phytochromes, flavonoids, and the chemical precursors to the cuticle. However, unlike higher plants they do not go through a multicellular alternation of generations.

== Taxonomy ==
The current taxonomy of algae is based on molecular phylogenetics. Older classifications are simpler and more morphologically aligned; however, these classifications are recognized as artificial due to the extensive morphological convergence present within the class (and more broadly within algae). In even older, historical classifications, the term Chlorophyceae is sometimes used to apply to all the green algae except the Charales, and the internal division is considerably different.

As of May 2023, AlgaeBase accepted the following orders in the class Chlorophyceae:

- Chaetopeltidales C.J.O'Kelly, Shin Watanabe, & G.L.Floyd – 16 species
- Chaetophorales Wille – 225 species
- Chlamydomonadales F.E.Fritsch (also known as Volvocales) – 1793 species
- Oedogoniales Heering – 792 species
- Sphaeropleales Luerssen – 941 species

Along with these genera, AlgaeBase recognizes several taxa that are incertae sedis (i.e. unplaced to an order):

- Dangeardinellaceae Ettl - 1 species

Other orders that have been recognized include:

- Dunaliellales – Dunaliella and Dunaliellaceae are placed in Chlamydomonadales by AlgaeBase
- Chlorococcales – Chlorococcum and Chlorococcaceae are placed in Chlamydomonadales by AlgaeBase
- Microsporales – Microspora and Microsporaceae are placed in Sphaeropleales by AlgaeBase
- Tetrasporales – Tetraspora and Tetrasporaceae are placed in Chlamydomonadales by AlgaeBase

=== Phylogeny ===
Current thinking of phylogenetic relationships are as follows:

- - - - Sphaeropleales sensu lato
      - Chlamydomonadales (= Volvocales) sensu lato
    - OCC clade
      - Oedogoniales
      - - Chaetopeltidales
        - Chaetophorales
  - Trebouxiophyceae (outgroup)

== See also ==
- List of Chlorophyceae genera
