= Spongiochloris spongiosa =

Scientific classification
- Clade: Viridiplantae
- Division: Chlorophyta
- Class: Chlorophyceae
- Order: Chlamydomonadales
- Family: Chlorococcaceae
- Genus: Spongiochloris
- Species: S. spongiosa

Binomial name
- Spongiochloris spongiosa (Vischer) Starr

Species of alga

Spongiochloris spongiosa is a freshwater green alga species in the genus Spongiochloris.

Phenolic acids such as protocatechuic, p-hydroxybenzoic, 2,3-dihydroxybenzoic, chlorogenic, vanillic, caffeic, p-coumaric and salicylic acid, cinnamic acid and hydroxybenzaldehydes such as p-hydroxybenzaldehyde, 3,4-dihydroxybenzaldehyde and vanillin can be isolated from in vitro culture of S. spongiosa.
