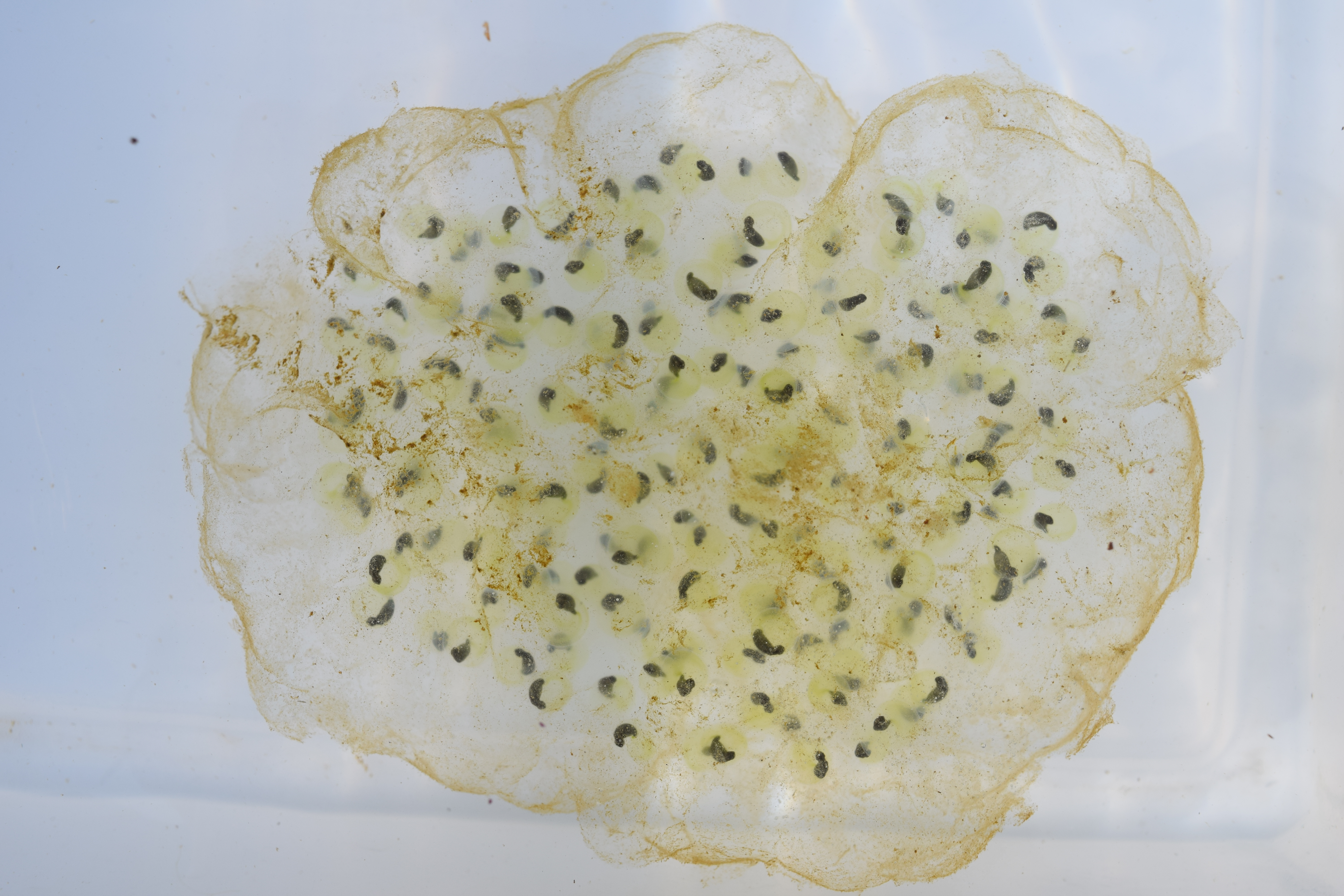
- Ambystoma maculatum clear egg mass with green color from algae

Scientific classification
- Domain: Eukaryota
- Supergroup: Archaeplastida
- Clade: Viridiplantae
- Division: Chlorophyta
- Class: Chlorophyceae
- Order: Chlamydomonadales
- Family: Chlorococcaceae
- Genus: Oophila
- Species: O. amblystomatis

Binomial name
- Oophila amblystomatis F.D.Lambert ex N.Wille

Synonyms
- Chlorococcum amblystomatis (F.D.Lambert ex N.Wille) N.Correia, J.Varela & Leonel Pereira

= Chlorococcum amblystomatis =

Species of algae

Oophila amblystomatis is a species of single-celled green algae known for its symbiotic relationship with the spotted salamander, Ambystoma maculatum. It grows symbiotically inside salamander eggs, primarily in the eggs of the spotted salamander. It has also been reported in other salamander species, such as the Japanese black salamander, Hynobius nigrescens, which is endemic to Japan. It is the only named species in genus Oophila.

== Taxonomy and etymology ==
Oophila ("egg-loving") is a reference to the algae's behavior of living with eggs. The specific epithet amblystomatis means "of Amblystoma", an unaccepted spelling correction for the salamander genus Ambystoma. The species has alternatively been placed in genus Chlorococcum.

Various isolates labelled as Oophila have a symbiotic relationship with amphibian (salamander and frog) eggs. Phylogenetic evidence indicates that such egg-loving green algae evolved not once, but twice, as so-called Oophila is actually polyphyletic and consists of two clades: one containing O. amblystomatis nested in Chlamydomonas, the other mixed among Chlorococcum. In the Japanese black salamander Hynobius nigrescens, two algae species, one from each clade, are present.

== Growth ==
O. amblystomatis cells invade and grow inside salamander egg capsules. Once inside, it metabolizes the carbon dioxide produced by the embryo and provides it with oxygen and sugar as a result of photosynthesis. This is an example of endosymbiosis. The relationship between some salamanders and some species of green algae, including O. amblystomatis, is the only known example of an intracellular endosymbiont in vertebrates. This symbiosis between O. amblystomatis and the salamander may exist beyond the oocyte and early embryonic stage. Chlorophyll autofluorescence observation and ribosomal DNA analysis suggest that this algal species has invaded embryonic salamander tissues and cells during development and may even be transmitted to the next generation.

Free-living O. amblystomatis have been reported growing in freshwater woodland ponds. They grow best at a water depth of 30 cm (12 in) with the water temperature being 15 °C (59 °F) and an air temperature of 14 °C (57 °F). Their optimal pH tolerance ranges from 6.26 to 6.46. Cells are motile via a flagellum. O. amblystomatis can reproduce sexually and asexually. 16S rRNA has been partially sequenced as well as the 18S rRNA for the plasmid, however whole genome sequencing has not been done.

== See also ==
- Chlorogonium
