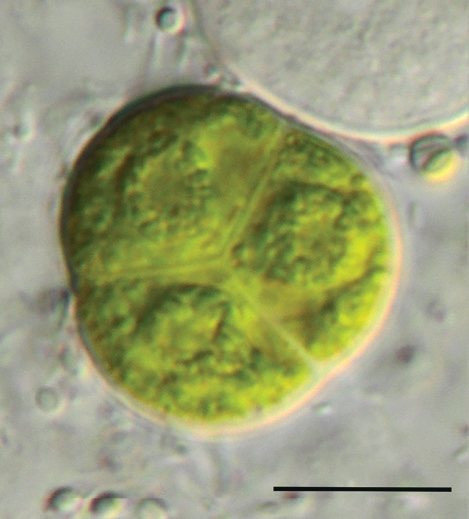
- Tetracystis vinatzeri

Scientific classification
- Kingdom: Plantae
- Division: Chlorophyta
- Class: Chlorophyceae
- Order: Chlamydomonadales
- Family: Chlorococcaceae
- Genus: Tetracystis; R.M.Brown & Bold

Type species
- Tetracystis aeria R.M.Brown & Bold

Species
- See text

= Tetracystis =

Genus of algae

Tetracystis is a genus of green algae, in the family Chlorococcaceae. It is a terrestrial genus typically found in soils.

== Description ==
Tetracystis consists of cells with internal structure similar to Chlorococcum; however, they are usually in groups of two or four cells. Young cells may be ellipsoidal to ovoid, while mature cells are roughly spherical. The cell wall is thin or thick, and may be thickened at the one or both poles. The single chloroplast is cup-shaped but often dissected or lobed into many fine rays; the chloroplast has a single pyrenoid in the center, surrounded by starch grains.

Tetracystis reproduces asexually by the formation of biflagellate zoospores, aplanospores, or autospores.

== Species list ==
- T. aeria
- T. aggregata
- T. aplanospora
- T. compacta
- T. diplobionticoidea
- T. dissociata
- T. elliptica
- T. excentrica
- T. fissurata
- T. illinoisensis
- T. intermedia
- T. isobilateralis
- T. macrostigmata
- T. micropyrenoides
- T. nagasakiensis
- T. pampae
- T. pulchra
- T. sarcinalis
- T. tetraspora
- T. texensis
- T. vinatzeri
