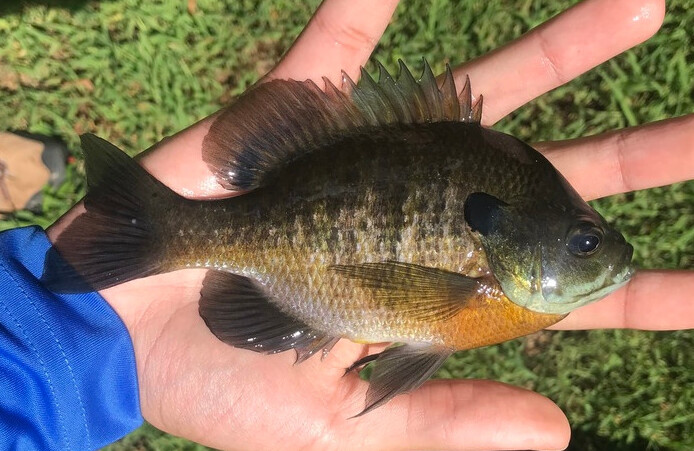

Conservation status
- Least Concern (IUCN 3.1)

- Secure (NatureServe)

Scientific classification
- Kingdom: Animalia
- Phylum: Chordata
- Class: Actinopterygii
- Division: Teleostei
- Order: Centrarchiformes
- Family: Centrarchidae
- Genus: Lepomis
- Species: L. macrochirus

Binomial name
- Lepomis macrochirus Rafinesque, 1810

Synonyms
- Lepomis purpurescens Cope, 1870

= Bluegill =

Species of fish

The bluegill (Lepomis macrochirus), sometimes referred to as "bream", "brim", "sunny", or, in Texas, "copper nose", is a species of North American freshwater fish, native to and commonly found in streams, rivers, lakes, ponds and wetlands east of the Rocky Mountains. It is from the family Centrarchidae (sunfishes, crappies and black basses) in the order Centrarchiformes.

Bluegills can grow up to 16 in (41 cm) long and about 4 1/2 lb (2.0 kg). While their color can vary from population to population, they typically have a very distinctive coloring, with deep blue and purple on the face and gill cover, dark olive-colored bands down the side, and a fiery orange to yellow belly. They are omnivorous and will consume anything they can fit in their mouth, but mostly feed on small aquatic insects and baitfishes. The fish are important prey for bass, other larger sunfish, northern pike and muskellunge, walleye, trout, herons, kingfishers, snapping turtles and otters, and play a key role within the food chain of its freshwater ecosystem.

A popular panfish among anglers, bluegill usually hide around and inside old tree stumps in swamps and other underwater structures (e.g. snags), and can live in either deep or very shallow water. Bluegills also like to find shelter among aquatic plants and in the shade of trees along banks, and will often move from one cover to another depending on the time of day or season.

== Description ==
The bluegill is noted for the large black appendage (the "ear") on each side of the posterior edge of the gill covers as well as the base of the dorsal fin. The sides of its head and chin are commonly a dark shade of blue, hence the name "bluegill". The precise coloration will vary due to the presence of neurally controlled chromatophores under the skin. The fish usually displays 5–9 vertical bars on the sides of its body immediately after being caught as part of its threat display. It typically has a yellowish breast and abdomen, with the breast of the breeding male being a bright orange. The bluegill has three anal fin spines, ten to 12 anal fin rays, six to 13 dorsal fin spines, 11 to 12 dorsal rays, and 12 to 13 pectoral rays. They are characterized by their deep, flattened bodies. They have a terminal mouth, ctenoid scales, and a lateral line that is arched upward anteriorly.

The bluegill typically ranges in size from about 4 to 12 inches (100–300 mm), and reaches a maximum size just over 16 inches (410 mm). The largest bluegill ever caught was 4 lb 12 oz (2.2 kg) in 1950.

The bluegill is most closely related to the orangespotted sunfish and the redear sunfish, but differ in having a dark blotch at the rear of the dorsal fin. The blotch is present in most adult fish, and absent in young juveniles. A few other sunfish species may also have a blotch in that area. Features of bluegills that distinguish it from all other sunfish species include a solid black "ear" and a face with blue markings only below the mouth and gills.

=== Potential subspecies ===
Bluegills are sometimes split into three subspecies, although their validity is contested. This includes the northern bluegill (L. m. macrochirus), the coppernose bluegill (L. m. purpurascens), and the southwestern bluegill (L. m. speciosus).

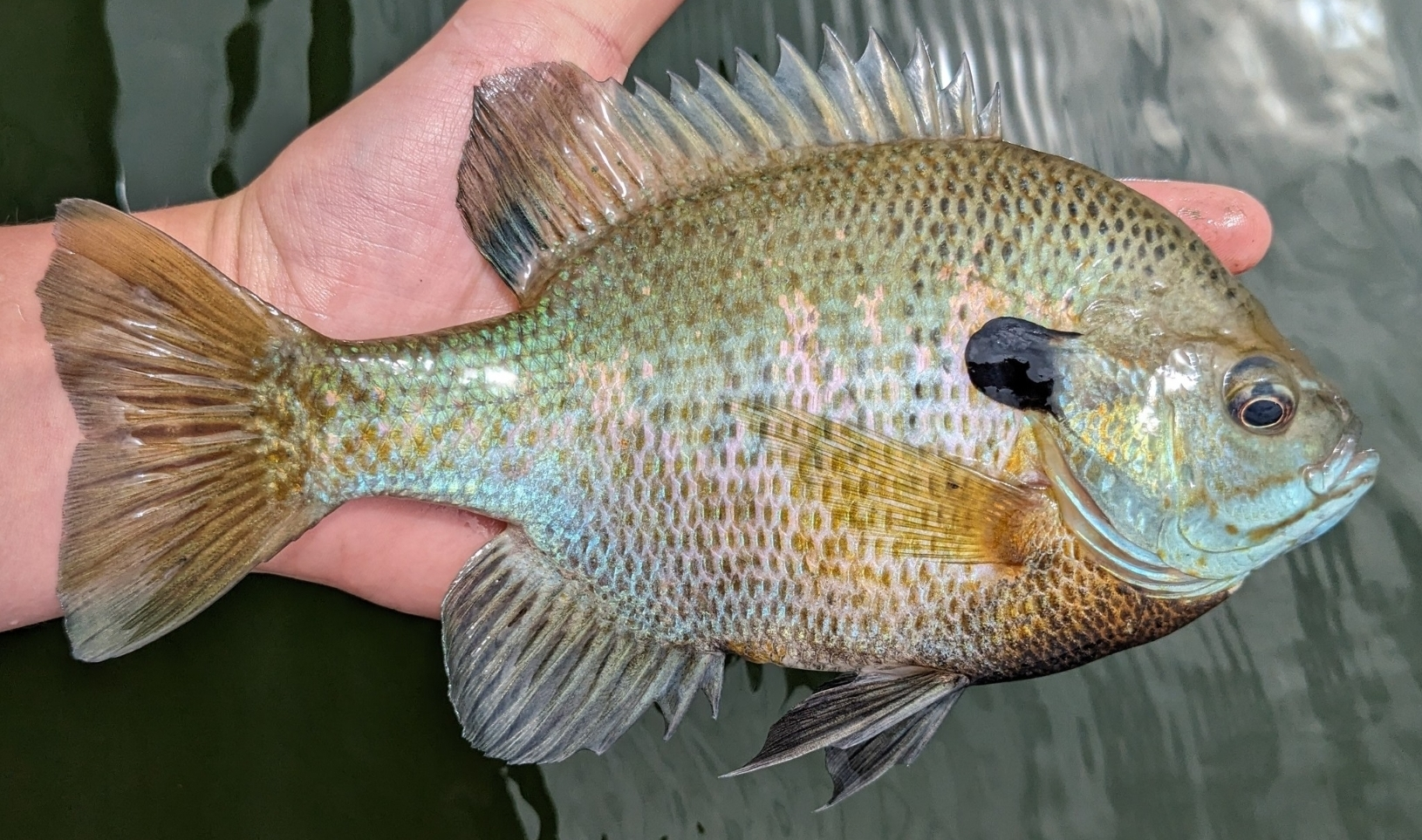
Northern bluegill, in Michigan

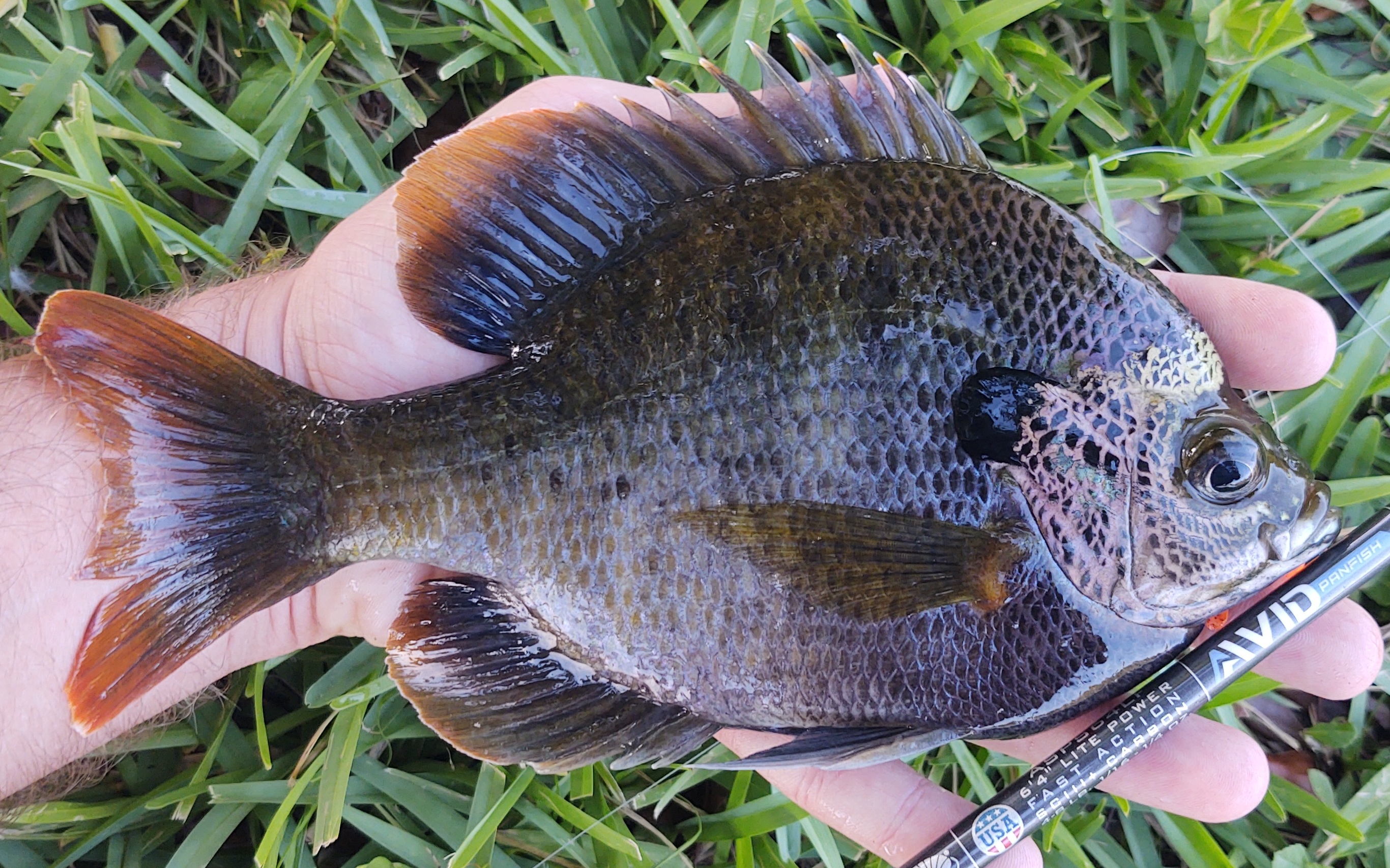
Coppernose bluegill, in Florida

== Distribution and habitat ==
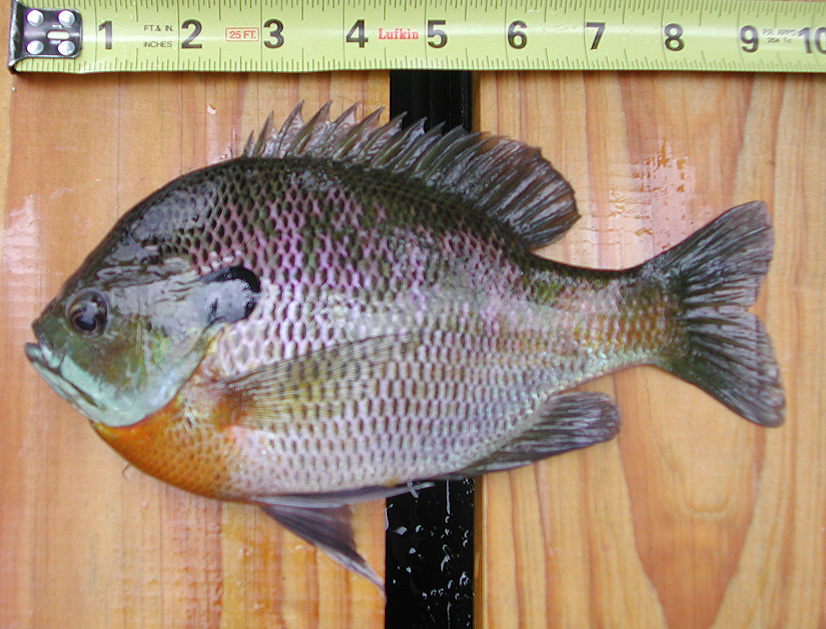
Bluegill caught from Lake Lanier

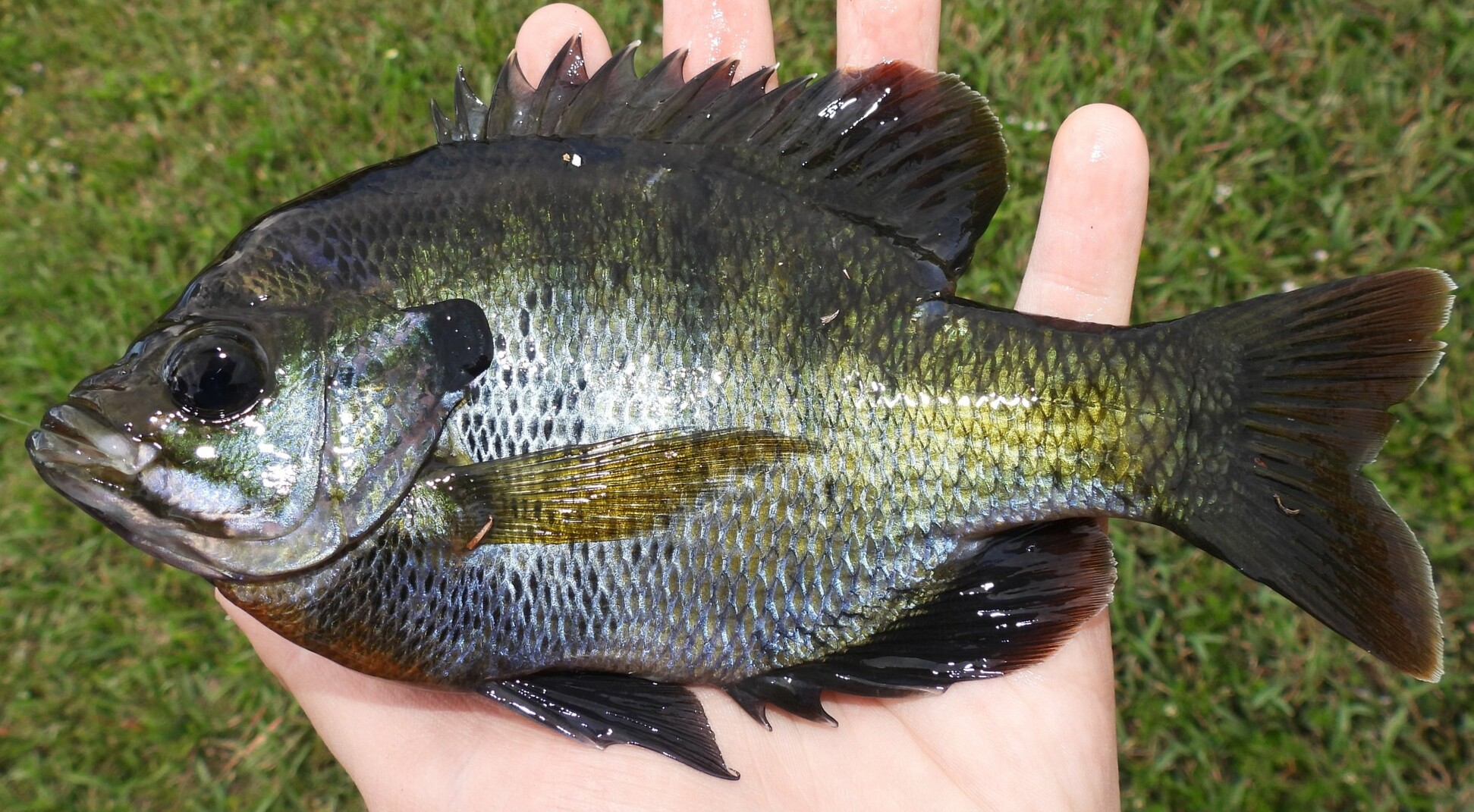
Coppernose bluegill, in Florida

The bluegill occurs naturally in the United States east of the Rocky Mountains from coastal Virginia to Florida, west to Texas and northern Mexico, and north to western Minnesota, New York and southeastern Ontario. They have been introduced widely in North America and Europe, South Africa, Zimbabwe, Asia, South America, and Oceania. Bluegills have also been found in the Chesapeake Bay, indicating they can tolerate up to 1.8% salinity.

In some locations where they have been transplanted, they are considered pests: trade in the species is prohibited in Germany and Japan. In the case of Japan, bluegills were presented to the then-crown prince, Akihito, in 1960 as a gift by Richard J. Daley, mayor of Chicago. The prince, in turn, donated the fish to fishery research agencies in Japan, from which they escaped and became an invasive species that wreaked havoc with native species, especially in Lake Biwa. Akihito has since apologized.

Bluegill live in the shallow waters of many lakes and ponds, along with streams, creeks, and rivers. They prefer water with many aquatic plants, and seclude themselves within or near fallen logs, water weeds or any other structure (natural or manmade) that is under water. They can often be found around weed beds, where they search for food or spawn. In the summer, adults move to deep, open water where they suspend just below the surface and feed on plankton and other aquatic creatures. Bluegill try to spend most of their time in water from 60 to 80 °F (16 to 27 °C), and tend to have a home range of about 320 square feet (30 m^{2}) during nonreproductive months. They enjoy heat, but do not like direct sunlight – they typically live in deeper water, but will linger near the water surface in the morning to stay warm. Bluegill are usually found in schools of 10 to 20 fish, and these schools will often include other panfish, such as crappie, pumpkinseeds, and smallmouth bass.

== Ecology ==
=== Diet and feeding ===
Young bluegills' diet consists of rotifers, copepods, water fleas, and insects (mainly chironomids). The adult diet consists of aquatic insect larvae (mayflies, caddisflies, dragonflies), but can also include terrestrial insects, zooplankton, shrimp, crayfish, leeches, other worms, snails, and other small fish (such as minnows). If food is scarce, bluegill will also feed on aquatic vegetation and algae, and if scarce enough, will even feed on their own eggs or offspring. As bluegill spend a great deal of time near the surface of water, they can also feed on surface bugs. Most bluegills feed during daylight hours, with a feeding peak being observed in the morning and evening (with the major peak occurring in the evening). Feeding location tends to be a balance between food abundance and predator abundance. Bluegill use gill rakers and bands of small teeth to ingest their food. During summer months, bluegills generally consume 3.2 percent of their body weight each day. To capture prey, bluegills use a suction system in which they accelerate water into their mouth. Prey comes in with this water. Only a limited amount of water is able to be suctioned, so the fish must get within 1.75 centimeters of the prey.

=== Predators ===
In turn, bluegill are prey to many larger species, including largemouth bass, smallmouth bass, striped bass, trout, muskellunge, turtles, northern pike, yellow perch, walleye, catfish, and even larger bluegill. Herons, kingfishers, and otters have also been witnessed catching bluegill in shallow water. However, the shape of the fish makes them hard to swallow. Raccoons are also believed to be among their predators.

== Reproduction and lifecycle ==
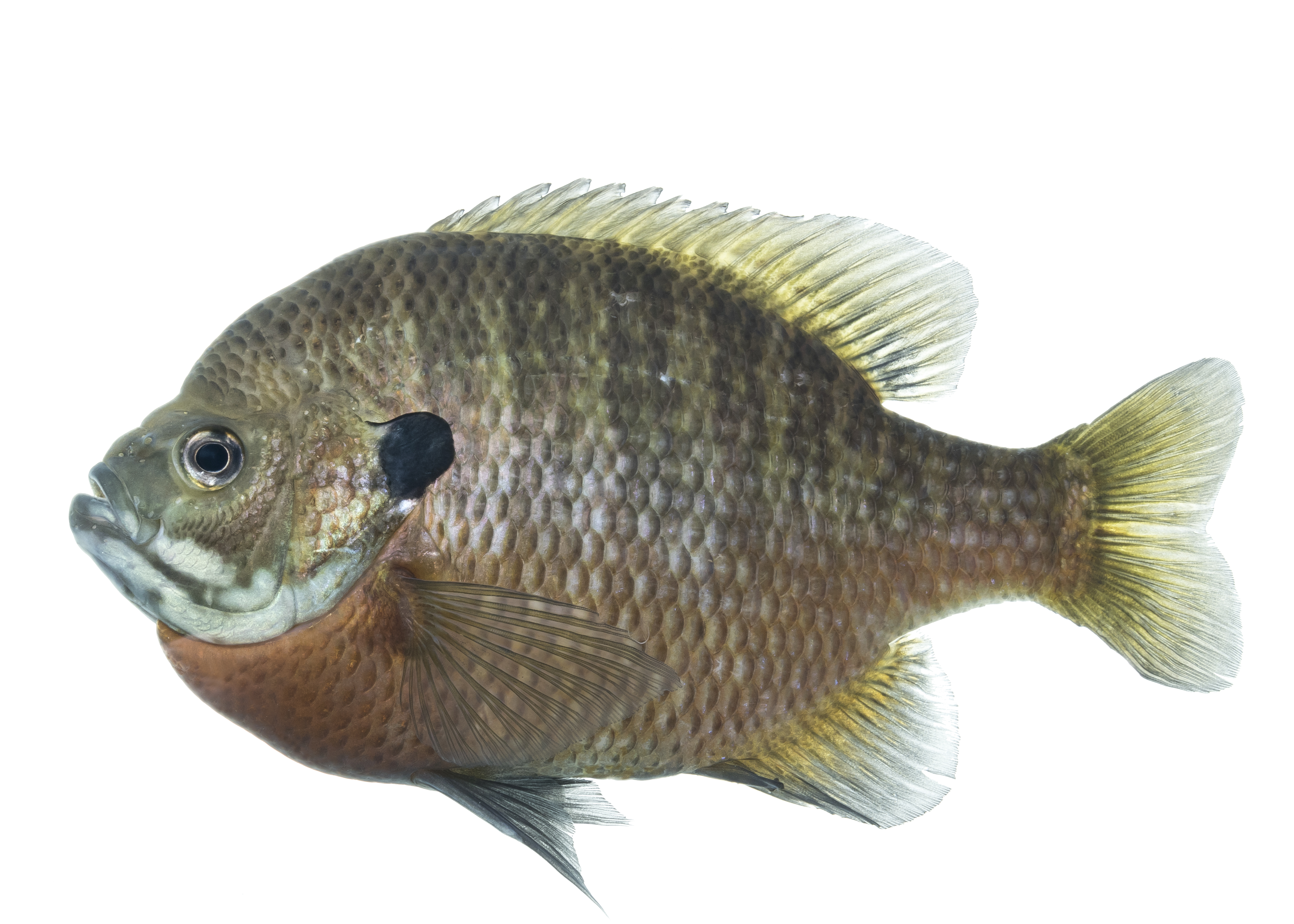
Male bluegill

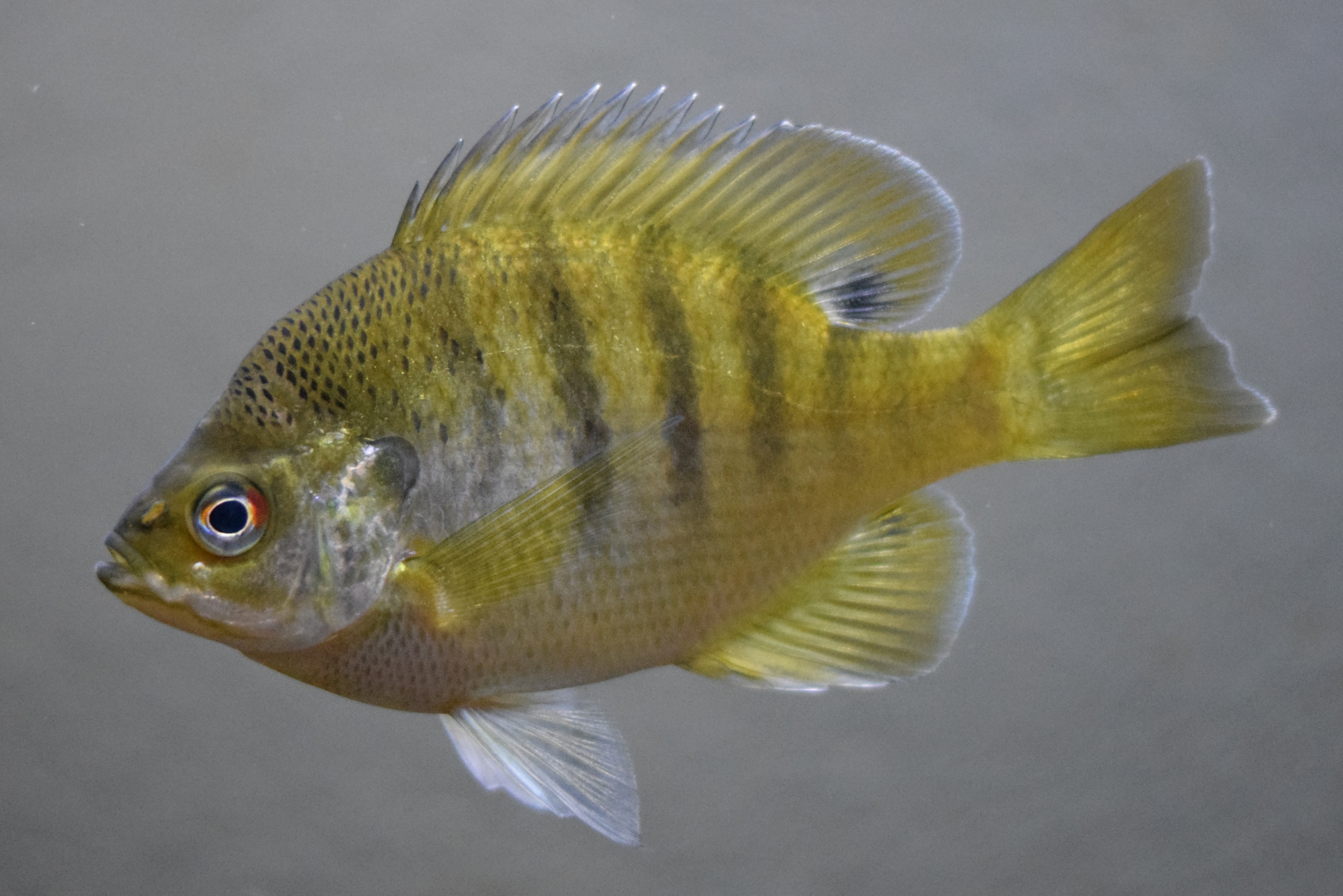
Bluegill in Florida. Pumpkinseed sunfish lack the dorsal fin blotch, and are known to more aggressively attack fish where the blotch is present.

Spawning season for bluegills starts late in May and extends into August. The peak of the spawning season usually occurs in June in waters of 67 to 80 °F (19 to 27 °C). The male bluegills arrive first at the mating site. They will make a spawning bed of six to 12 inches in diameter in shallow water, clustering as many as 50 beds together. The males scoop out these beds in gravel or sand. Males tend to be very protective and chase everything away from their nests, especially other male bluegills. Some bluegills, regardless of their small size, will even attack snorkelers if they approach the edge of the nest. As a female approaches, the male will begin circling and making grunting noises. The motion and sound of the males seem to attract the females. Females are very choosy and will usually pick males with larger bodies and "ears", making larger size a desirable trait for males to have. If the female enters the nest, both the male and female will circle each other, with the male expressing very aggressive behavior toward the female. If the female stays, the pair will enter the nest and come to rest in the middle. With the male in an upright posture, the pair will touch bellies, quiver, and spawn. These actions are repeated at irregular intervals several times in a row. Once the spawning is done, the male will chase the female out of the nest and guard the eggs. The fertilization process is entirely external. The male's sperm combines with the female's eggs in the water. Smaller males will often hide in nearby weeds and dart into the nest as they attempt to fertilize the eggs. They then quickly dart away. The size of the female plays a large role in how many eggs will be produced. A small female can produce as few as 1,000 eggs, and a large, healthy female can produce up to 100,000 eggs. The male continues to watch over the nest until the larvae are able to hatch and swim away on their own. The bluegill generally begins its spawning career at one year of age, but has been found to spawn as early as four months of age under favorable conditions. Anglers find spawning season to be a very successful time to fish for bluegills, as they aggressively attack anything, including a hook, that comes near.

The growth of the bluegill is very rapid in the first three years, but slows considerably once the fish reaches maturity. Many fish reach five to eight years old, and in extreme cases, can live 11 years.

=== Male polymorphism ===
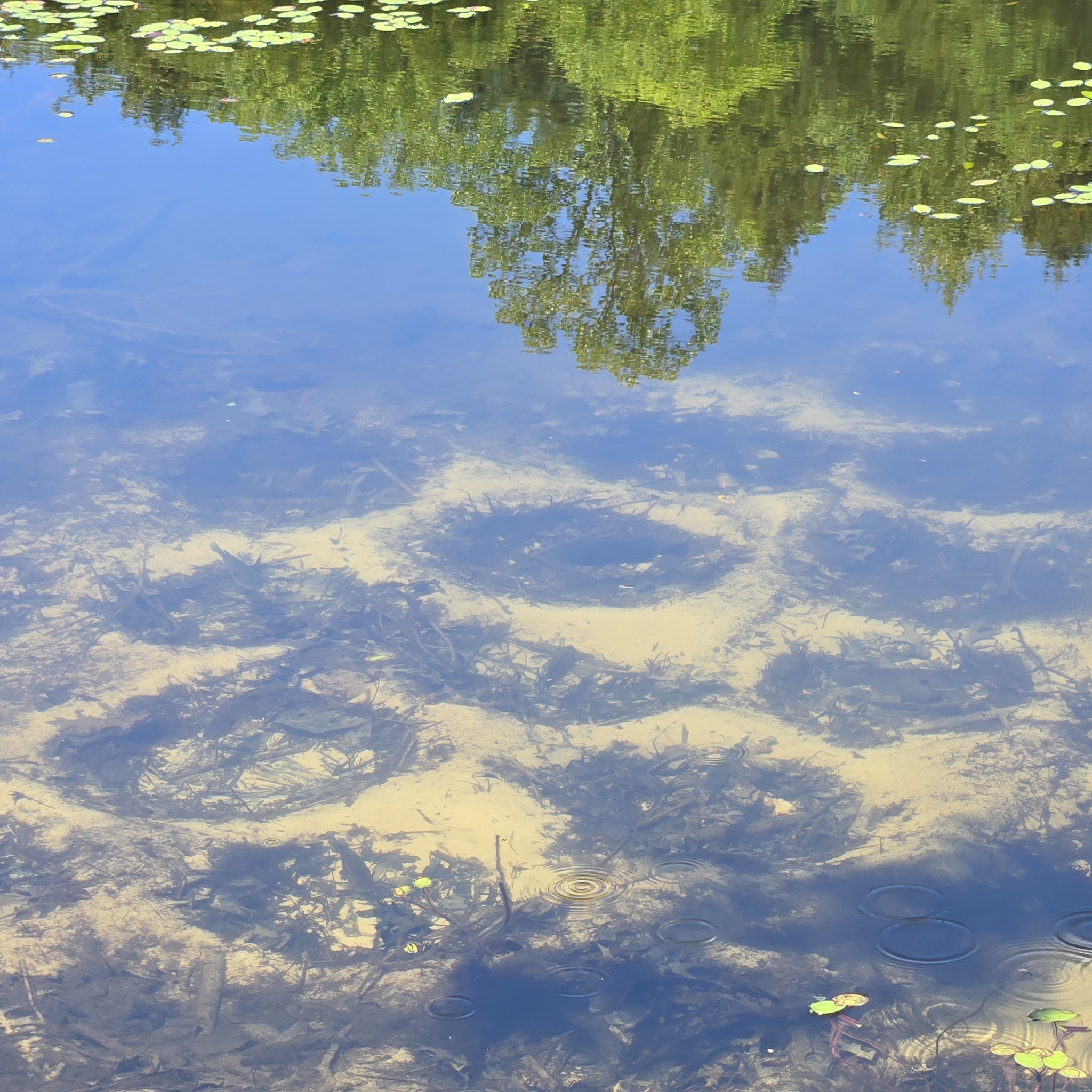
Bluegill nesting colony, in Tennessee

Bluegills nest in dense colonies in shallow waters during the breeding season; colonies have been recorded containing up to 272 nests – bowl shaped depressions in the lake floor. These nesting colonies are often referred to as leks. Very occasionally, a nest may be built in solitary instead of in association with a colony.

Polymorphism has been recorded in males of this species. Studies show that males come in two forms, each with a different reproductive strategy.

Young non-reproductive males delay sexual maturity until around 7 years old, when they mature into large "parental" males with bright yellow-orange breasts. Parental males construct nests by sweeping the floor with their tails. Schools of gravid females approach the colony, and enter nests individually to spawn. Parental males aggressively defend the nest and cares for the young. Parental care lasts about a week, at which point the fry become free-swimming and leave the nest.

Young brood parasitising males are reproductive at around 2 years old, acting as "sneakers", sneaking into nests of conspecifics to release sperm when females spawn. Sneaker males mature into small "satellite" males, which mimic the colouration of females, sporting dark vertical bars, dark colouration, and muted breast colour. They may also mimic female spawning behaviour. This allows satellite males to safely position themselves between spawning parental males and females, and release sperm.

=== Hybridization with other species ===
Occasionally a bluegill may spawn with another member of its genus, though this is rare. This tends to happen in bodies of water that are fairly isolated and have a decent population of bluegill in close proximity to another, smaller, population of lepomid species such as green sunfish. Limited nesting grounds can also factor in hybridization causing the females of one species to prefer the nest of another. Bluegill can theoretically hybridize with all other species in the genus Lepomis, though the most common hybrid is the greengill. The hybrid fish are aggressive and have larger mouths than their bluegill parent. These fish also grow faster than other small mouth fish due to its bigger mouth. Greengills or hybrid bluegills are the most efficient in growth and can reach approximately 2 lbs or 0.91 kg in one year.

By artificially stripping and fertilizing eggs, bluegills can hybridize with centrarchid species outside of the genus Lepomis, creating intergeneric hybrids. In this manner, bluegills have been crossed with black crappie (Pomoxis nigromaculatus) and largemouth bass (Micropterus salmoides).

Hybrids

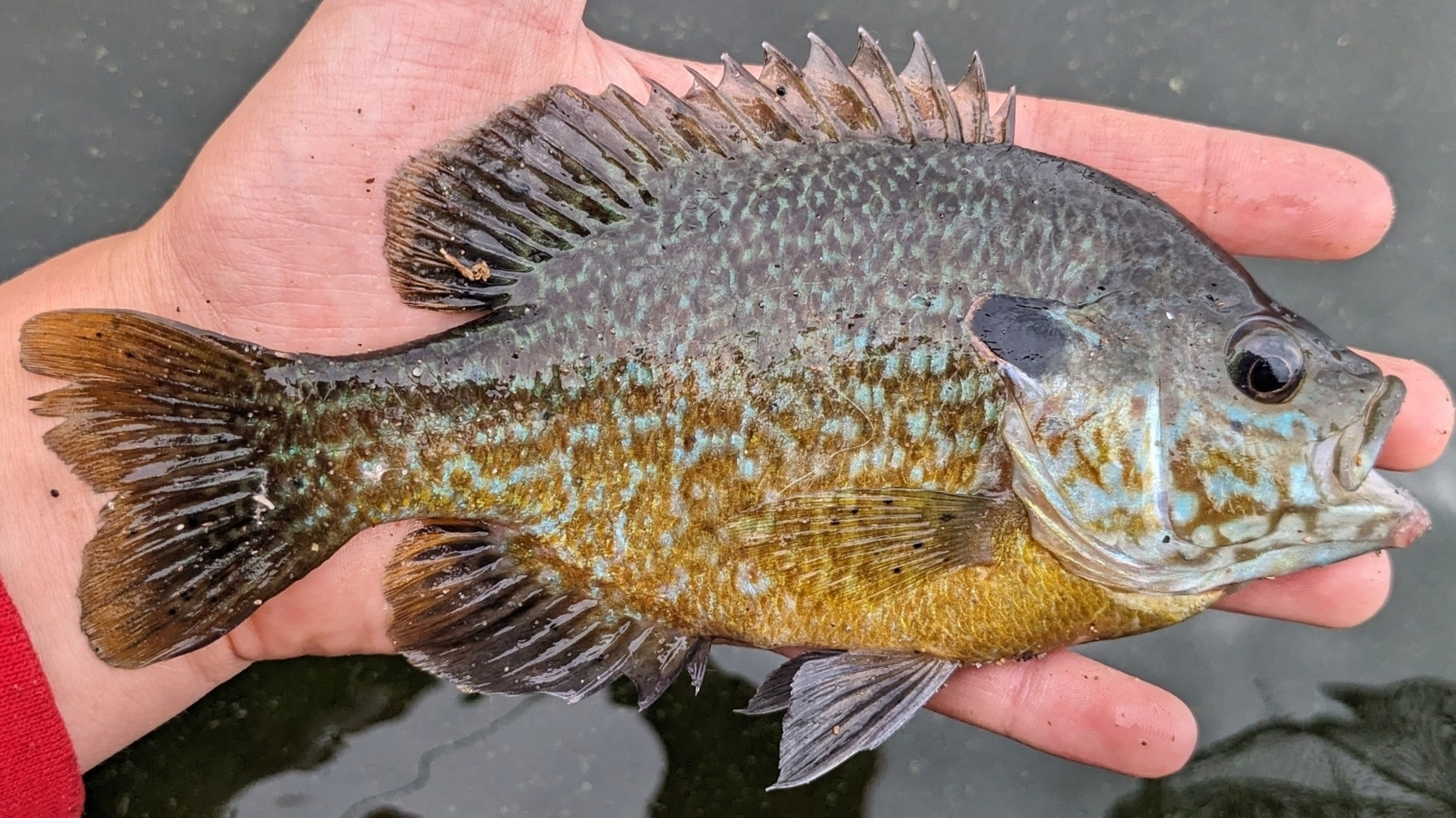
× L. cyanellus

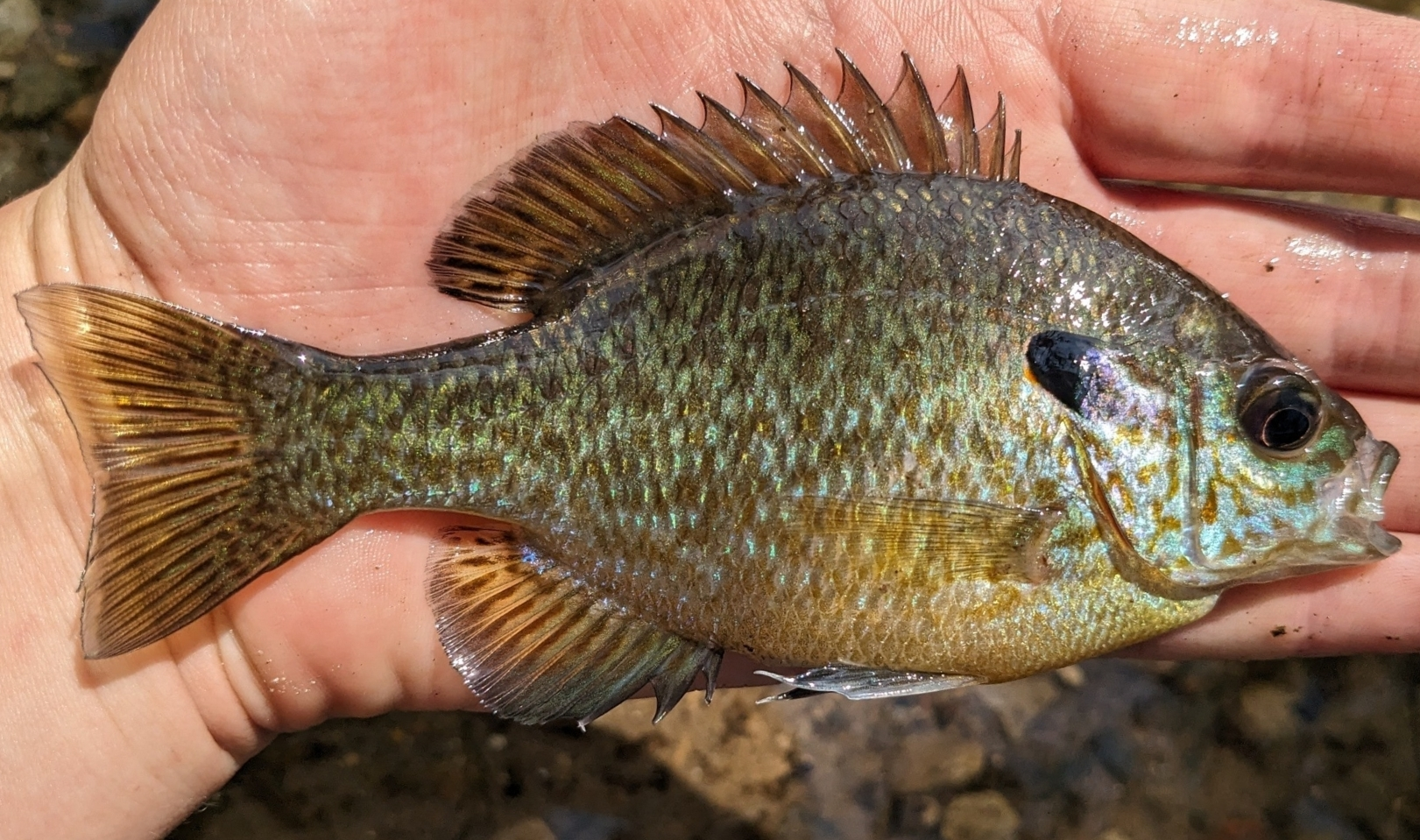
× L. peltastes

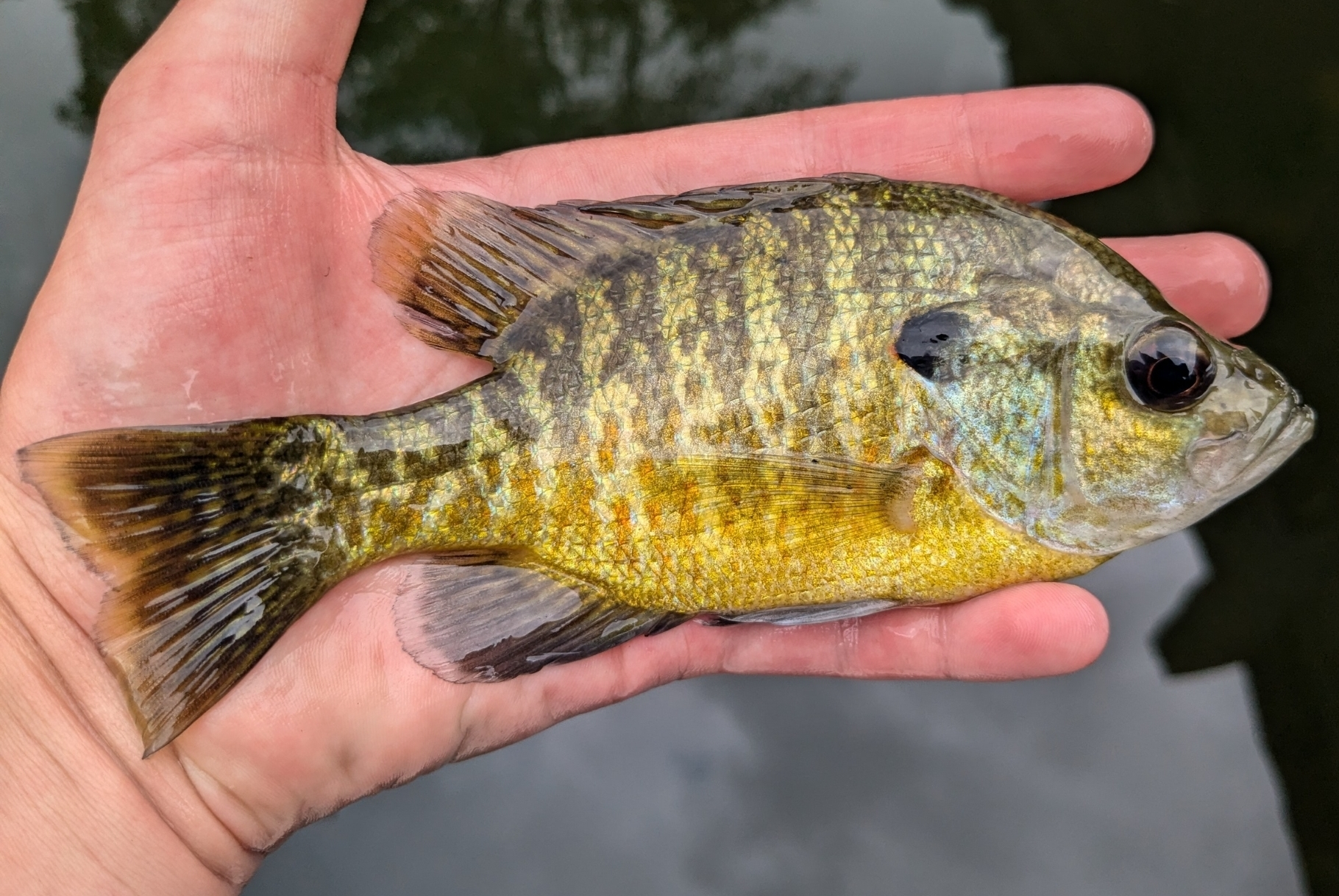
× L. gulosus

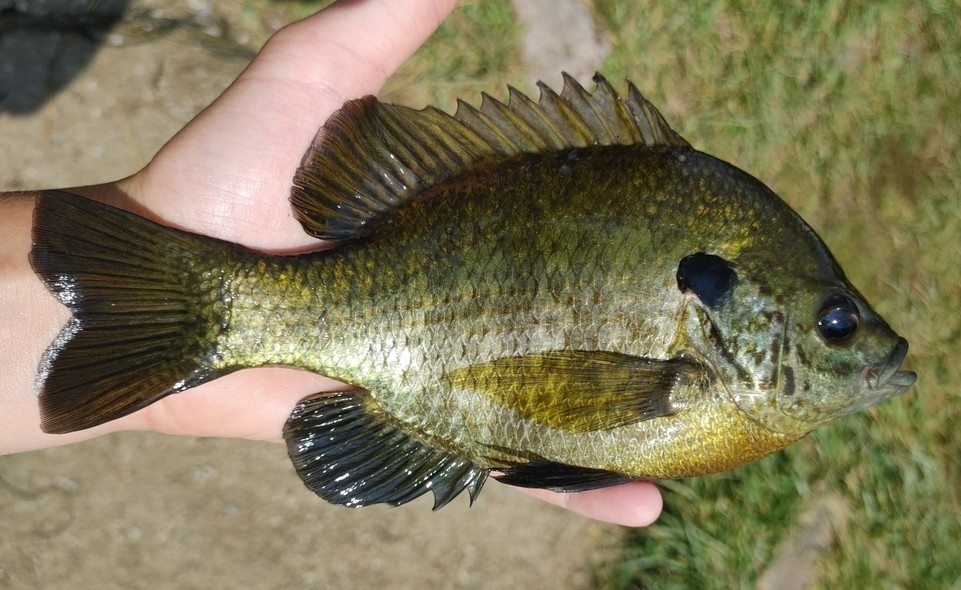
× L. microlophus

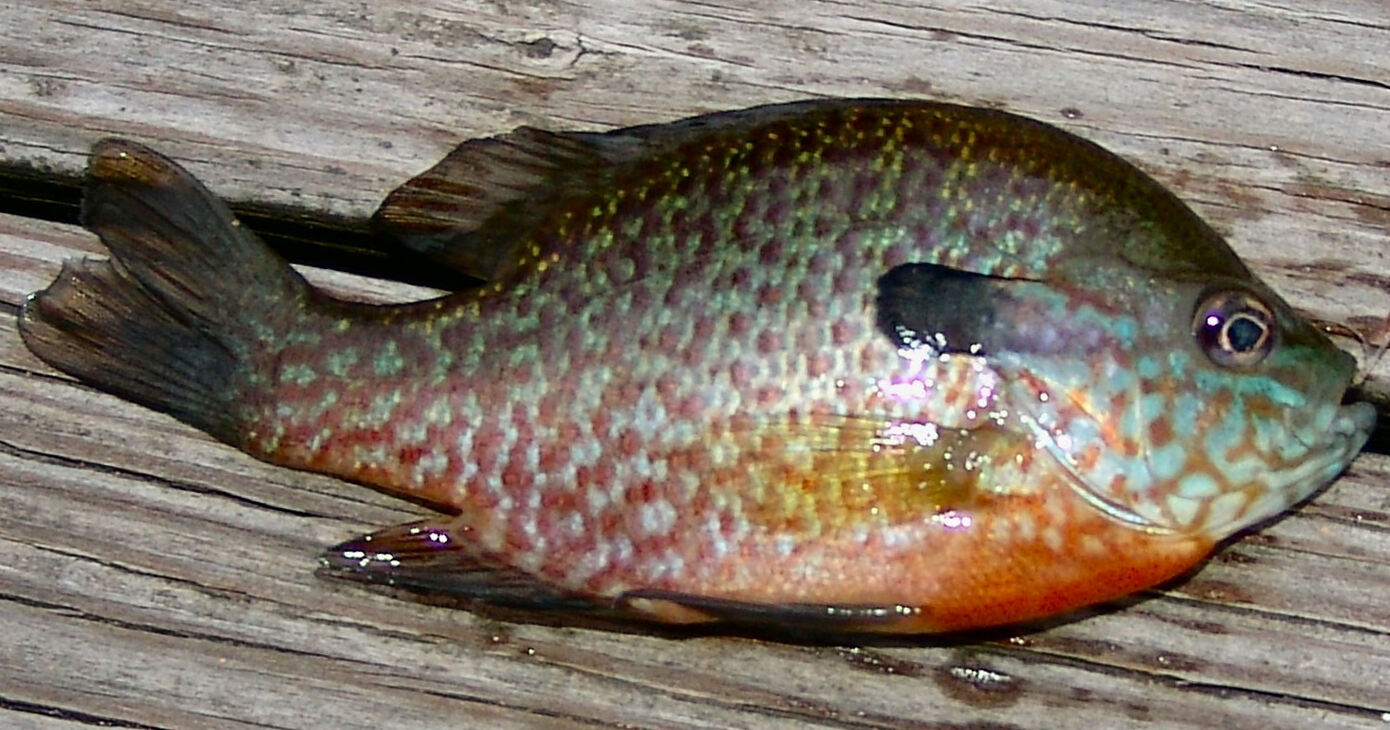
× L. megalotis

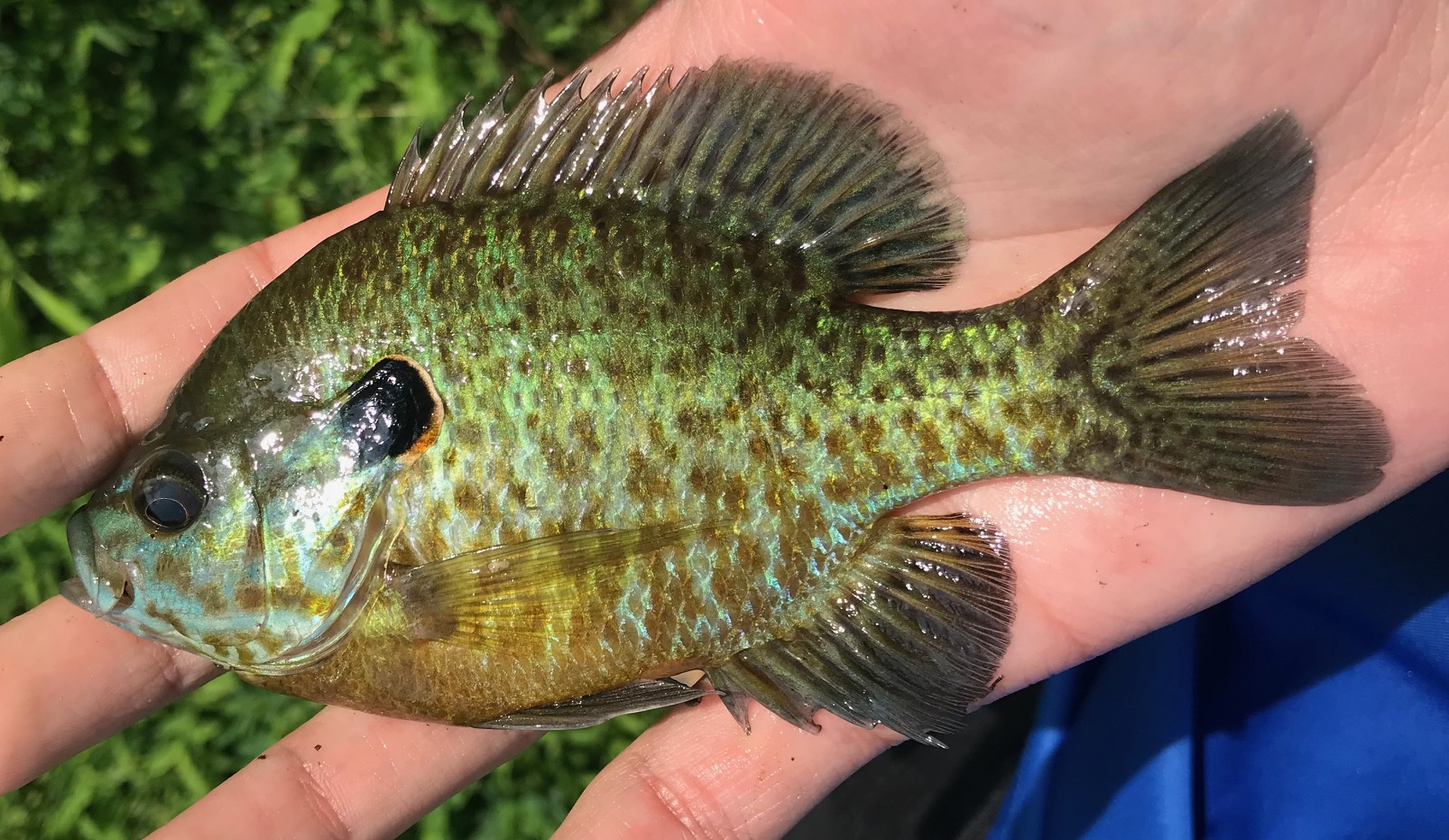
× L. gibbosus

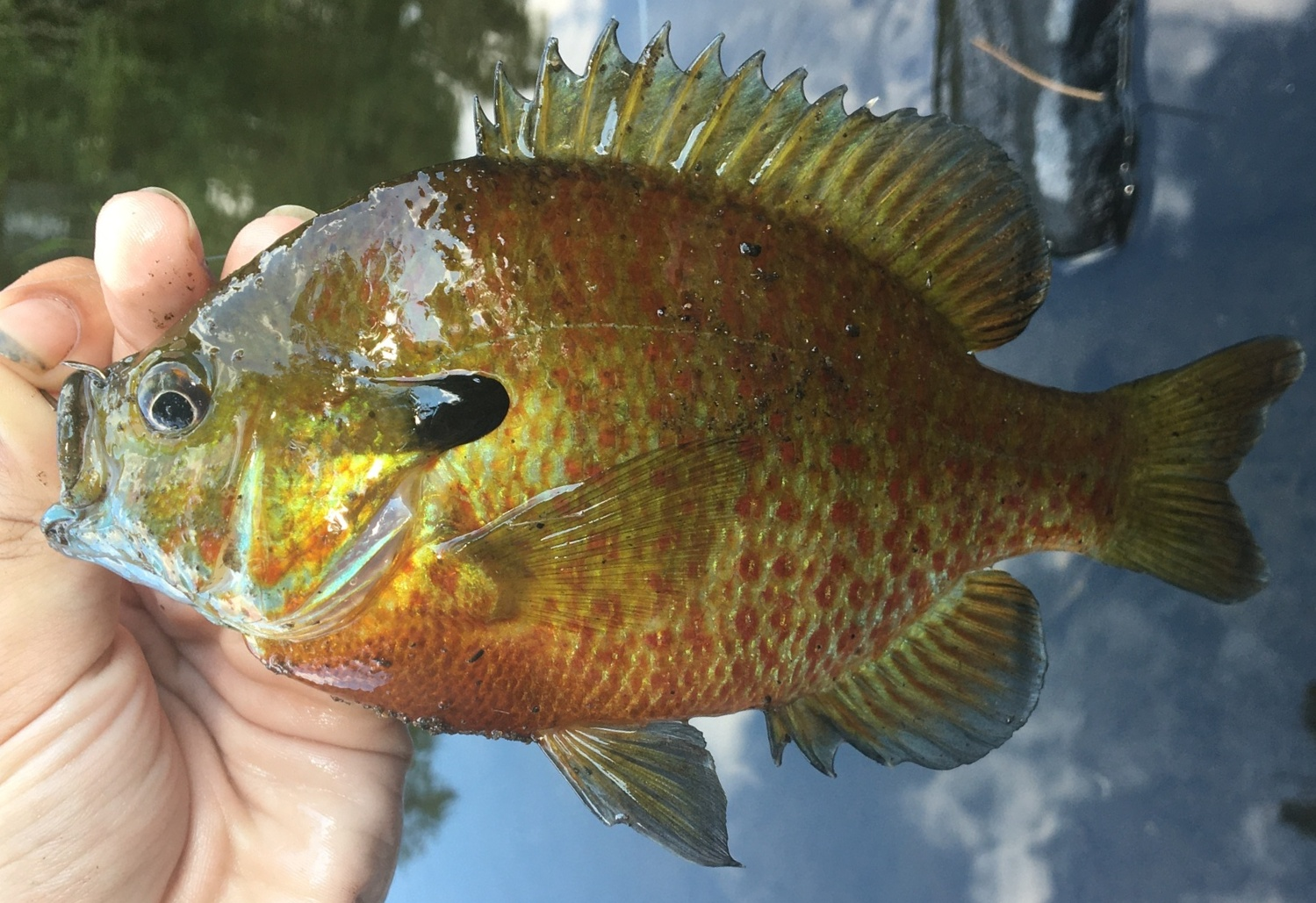
× L. auritus

== Adaptations ==
Bluegills have the ability to travel and change directions at high speeds by means of synchronized fin movements. They use notched caudal fins, soft dorsal fins, body undulations, and pectoral fins to move forward. Having a notched caudal fin allows them to accelerate quickly. The speed of their forward motion depends on the strength of which they abduct or adduct fins. The flat, slender body of the bluegill lowers water resistance and allows the bluegills to cut effectively through water. The large, flexible pectoral fins allow the fish to decelerate quickly. This superior maneuverability allows the bluegill to forage and escape predators very successfully. Bluegills have a lateral line system, as well as inner ears, that act as receptors for vibration and pressure changes. However, bluegills rely heavily on sight to feed, especially in their foraging. Optimal vision occurs in the daylight hours. The mouth of the bluegill is very small and requires the use of the pharynx to suck in prey.

=== Standard and backward swimming ===
The bluegill sunfish relies heavily on the flexibility of its fins to maintain maneuverability in response to fluid forces. The bluegill's segmentation in its pectoral fin rays mitigates the effects of fluid forces on the fish's movement. The bluegill has a variety of unusual adaptations that allow it to navigate different environments. In conditions where the bluegill is deprived of its various sensory abilities, it utilizes its pectoral fins in navigation. If the bluegill's visual input or lateral line input were to be compromised, its pectoral fins are then able to be utilized as mechanosensors through the bending of the fin(s) when the fish comes into contact with its environment. In standard swimming the bluegill sunfish relies on its caudal (tail) fin, dorsal fin, and anal fin. The bluegill's caudal fin muscles are important in the fish's slow swimming and also important in the beginning stages of the fish increasing its swimming speed. The dorsal and anal fins are two types of median fins that work in parallel to balance torque during steady swimming.

When swimming backwards, the bluegill utilizes a plethora of fin muscles located in various parts of its body. Backward swimming in the bluegill is more complex than steady swimming, as it is not just the reversal of forward swimming. The fish utilizes its pectoral fins to provide a rhythmic beat while the dorsal and anal fins produce momentum to drive the fish backwards. The pectoral fins' rhythmic beat is asymmetric and aids the fish's balance in its slow, backward movement.

=== C-start escape response ===
The bluegill, amongst a wide array of other fishes, exhibits the C-start escape response, which is generated by large neurons called Mauthner cells. Mauthner cells operate as a command center for the escape response and respond quickly once the neural pathway has been activated by an initial stimulus. The cells trigger a contraction of muscle that bends the fish body into a 'C' to then aid in the propulsion away from a predator. The C-start trajectory is highly variable, allowing the fish to alter its escape response each time. Because of this high variability, predators have a lower chance of learning a successful predation technique to capture the fish. The C-start escape response produces other advantages, including the ability to move quickly and unpredictably to capture prey.

Hydrodynamically, the bluegill exhibits specific flow patterns that accompany its C-start escape response. The caudal (tail) fin is a main source of momentum in typical kinematic models of the C-start escape response but the bluegill draws a majority of its momentum from the body bending associated with the response, as well as its dorsal and anal fins. The dorsal and anal fins' roles as propulsors during escape response suggest that the size of the fins could lead to an evolutionary advantage when escaping predators.

== Relationship with humans ==
The bluegill is the state fish of Illinois.

At Lake St. Helen, Michigan, an annual "Blue Gill Festival" is held in July.

=== Fishing ===
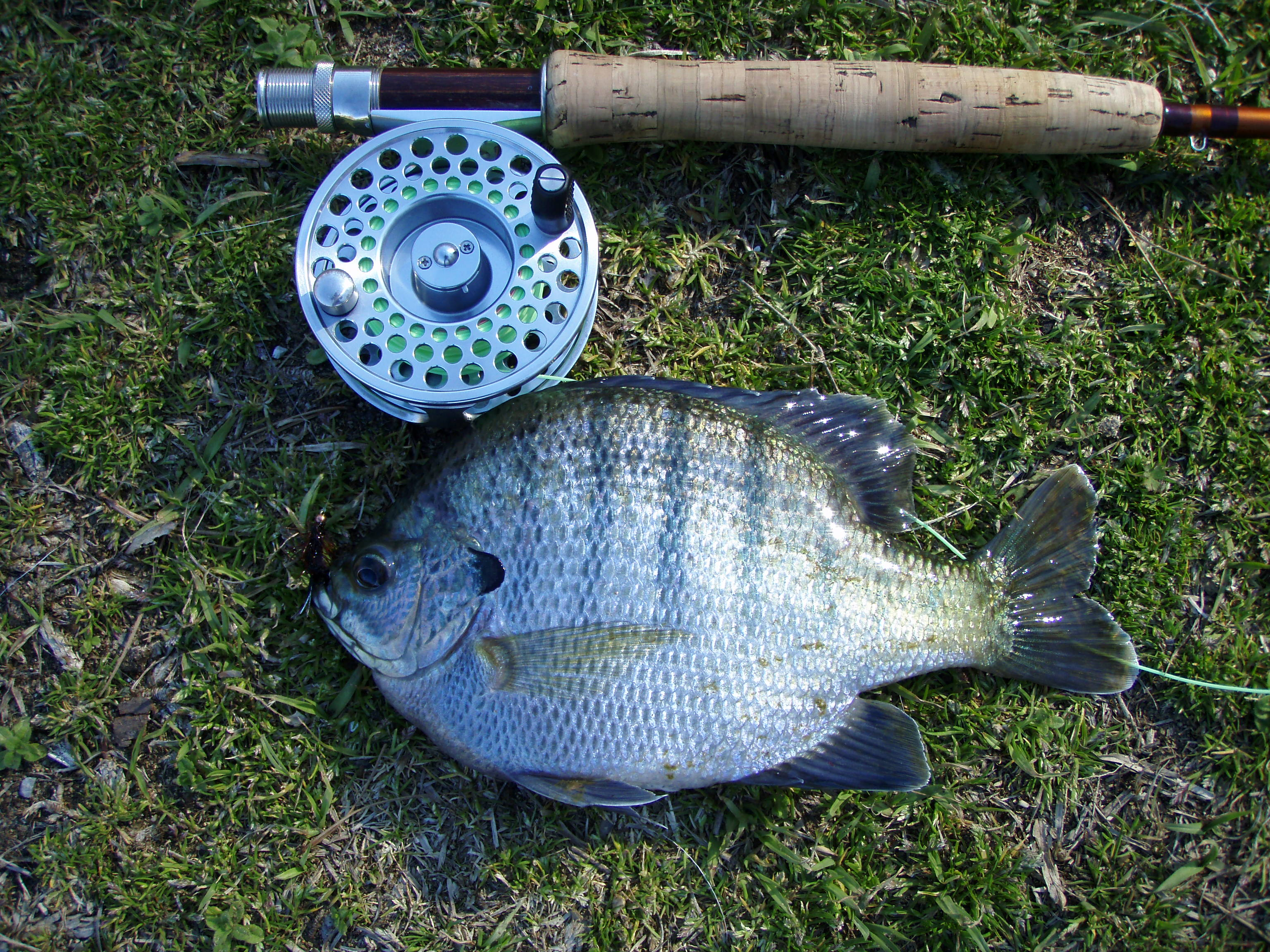
Bluegill caught in an Alabama pond

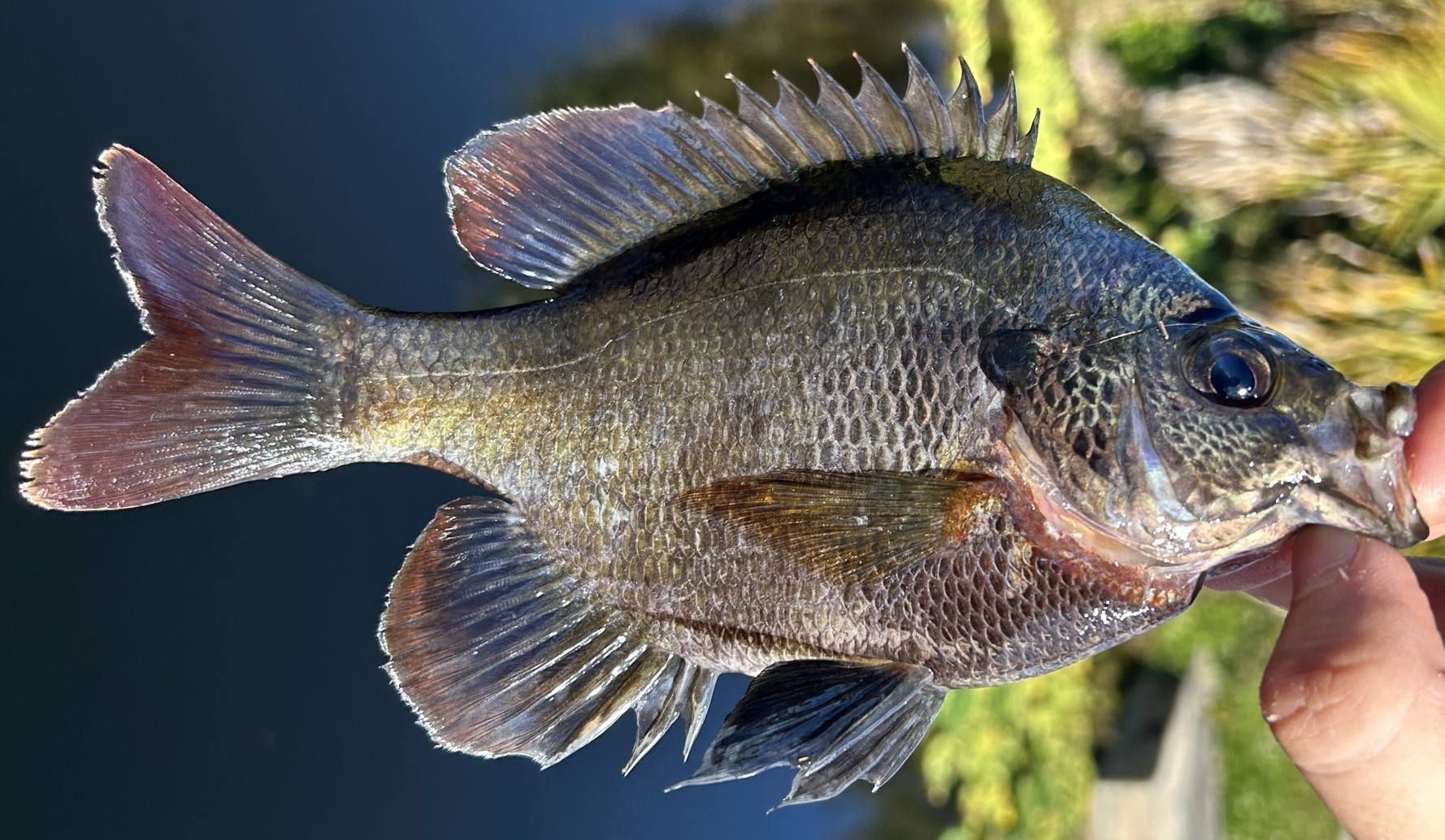
Coppernose bluegill, in Florida

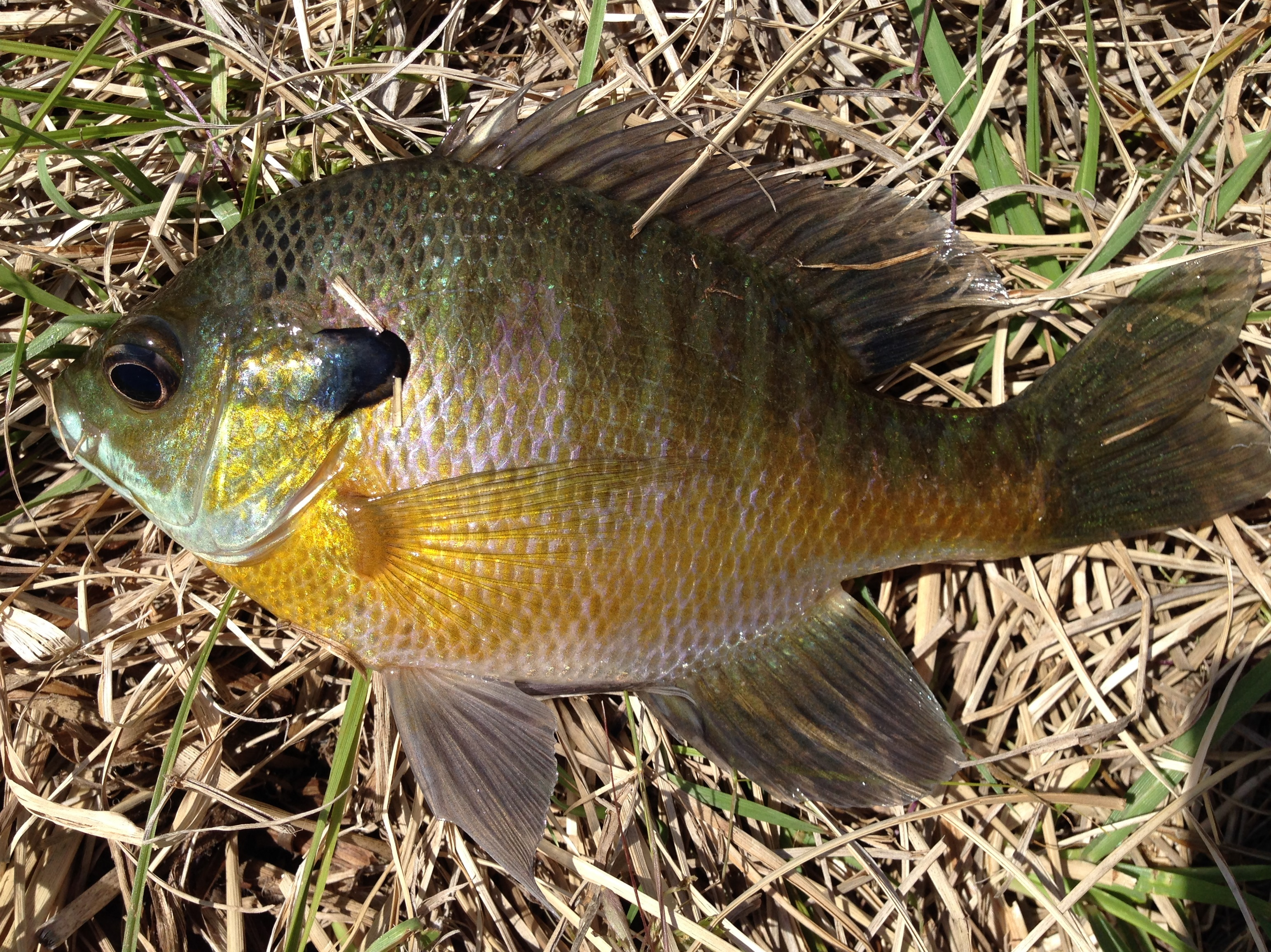
At the University of Mississippi Field Station

Bluegills are popular panfish, caught with live bait such as worms, crickets, grasshoppers, flies, minnows, maggots or small frogs, as well as small shrimp bits, processed bait, bread, corn, other table scraps, small crankbaits, spinners, fake worms, or even a bare hook. They mostly bite on vibrant colors like orange, yellow, green, or red, chiefly at dawn and dusk. They are noted for seeking out underwater vegetation for cover; their natural diet consists largely of crickets, water bugs, larvae, and very small fish. The bluegill itself is also occasionally used as bait for larger game fish species, such as blue catfish, flathead catfish and largemouth bass.

Fishermen are sometimes able to use polarized sunglasses to see through water and find bluegills' spawning beds. Bluegill have a rather bold character; many have no fear of humans, eating food directly dropped into the water, and a population in Canada's Lake Scugog will even allow themselves to be stroked by human observers. Because of their size and the method of cooking them, bluegills are often called panfish.

The IGFA all tackle world record for the species stands at 2.15 kg (4 lb 12 oz) caught from Ketona lake in Alabama in 1950.

=== Management ===
Bluegill populations are notably vulnerable to effects of angling and harvest, particularly in size-structure. Large males appear to be especially vulnerable to effects of fishing because of their tendency to guard nests in the center of colonies. Populations with large males are increasingly difficult to find, and are usually only found in remote locations without angling pressure or in more southern regions where growth rates are high. Reduced bag limits appear to show potential for improving size-structure in over-fished populations.

In a 1973 study reported by the EPA, the waterborne administration of 180 ppm of calcium propionate was found to be slightly toxic to bluegill.

Bluegills play an important role in pond and lake management to keep crustacean and insect populations low, as a single bluegill population may eat up to six times its own weight in just one summer. However, certain species of bluegill can become overpopulated and overrun a pond's ecosystem if not managed properly. Pond owners typically control the bluegill population by handfishing and trapping of the fish to control population size.
