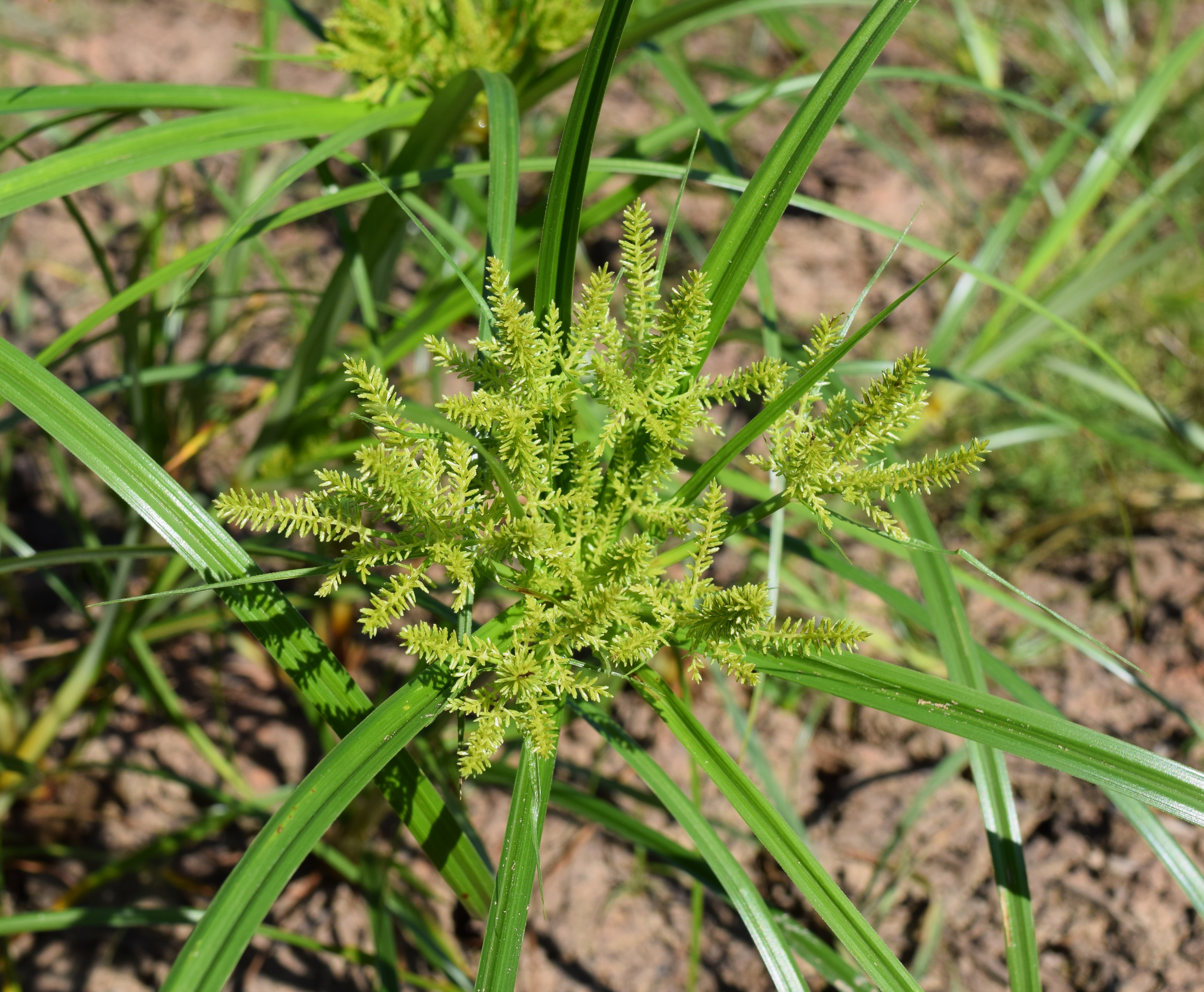
- University of Mississippi Field Station

Scientific classification
- Kingdom: Plantae
- Clade: Tracheophytes
- Clade: Angiosperms
- Clade: Monocots
- Clade: Commelinids
- Order: Poales
- Family: Cyperaceae
- Genus: Cyperus
- Species: C. erythrorhizos

Binomial name
- Cyperus erythrorhizos Muhl.

Synonyms
- Homotypic synonyms: Chlorocyperus erythrorhizus (Muhl.) Palla; Heterotypic synonyms: Cyperus chrysokerkos Steud.; Cyperus cupreus J.Presl & C.Presl; Cyperus erythrorhizos var. cupreus (J.Presl & C.Presl) Kük.; Cyperus erythrorhizos var. halei (Torr. ex Britton) Kük.; Cyperus erythrorhizos var. infirmus (Boeckeler) Kük.; Cyperus halei Torr. ex Britton; Cyperus infirmus Boeckeler; Cyperus occidentalis Torr.; Cyperus spiculatus Alph.Wood; Cyperus tenuiflorus Elliott; Cyperus washingtonensis Gand.

= Cyperus erythrorhizos =

Species of flowering plant

Cyperus erythrorhizos, also known as red-rooted flatsedge or redroot flatsedge, is a species of flowering plant in the sedge family Cyperaceae. It is native to North America, ranging from Canada to Mexico. It has bright red roots, a distinctive feature not found in any other North American flatsedge. Both the scientific name and the common name emphasize this fact.

== Description ==
Cyperus erythrorhizos is an annual sedge with red fibrous roots. It grows to a maximum of 1 m (3 ft 3 in) in height but is usually quite a bit shorter. It may have a number of long, wispy leaves around the base of the plant. The inflorescence may contain one to several spikes, each spike containing 20 to over 100 spikelets. Each spikelet is light greenish brown to reddish brown and is made up of up to 30 bracted flowers. The fruit is a glossy achene about a millimetre long.

== Taxonomy ==
Cyperus erythrorhizos was named and described by the American botanist Gotthilf Heinrich Ernst Muhlenberg in 1817. In his description, Muhlenberg emphasized the plant's red fibrous roots. As of February 2026, the botanical name Cyperus erythrorhizos Muhl. is widely accepted.

== Distribution and habitat ==
Cyperus erythrorhizos is native to North America, ranging from Canada to Mexico. It is most common in the United States. It was discovered in Vermont in 2014. In Canada, it occurs in British Columbia, Manitoba, Ontario, and Quebec. In Mexico, it was initially discovered in Baja California near the U.S. border based on a specimen collected in 1894. It was subsequently found in the state of Tabasco in southern Mexico. It is a plant of wet areas such as rivers and ditches, generally at low elevations. Its season runs from July to December.

== See also ==
- List of Cyperus species
- Glossary of botanical terms

== Bibliography ==
- Muhlenberg, Gotthilf Heinrich Ernst (1817). Descriptio uberior graminum et plantarum calamariarum Americae septentrionalis indigenarum et cicurum. Philadelphiae: Conrad.
- Tucker, Gordon C. (1994). "Revision of the Mexican Species of Cyperus (Cyperaceae)". Systematic Botany Monographs. 43: 1–213. doi:10.2307/25027842. JSTOR 25027842.
