= Octogoniella =

Scientific classification
- Clade: Viridiplantae
- Division: Chlorophyta
- Class: Chlorophyceae
- Order: Chlamydomonadales
- Family: Chlorococcaceae
- Genus: Octogoniella; Pascher, 1930
- Species: O. sphagnicola

Binomial name
- Octogoniella sphagnicola Pascher

Genus of algae

Octogoniella is a genus of green algae, in the family Chlorococcaceae. It contains a single species, Octogoniella sphagnicola, found as an epiphyte on Sphagnum leaves. It is a rarely recorded taxon.
