= Pseudotrochiscia =

Scientific classification
- Clade: Viridiplantae
- Division: Chlorophyta
- Class: Chlorophyceae
- Order: Chlamydomonadales
- Family: Chlorococcaceae
- Genus: Pseudotrochiscia; Vinatzer
- Species: P. areolata

Binomial name
- Pseudotrochiscia areolata Vinatzer, 1975

Genus of algae

Pseudotrochiscia is a genus of green algae, in the family Chlorococcaceae. It contains a single species, Pseudotrochiscia areolata. It has been recorded only once, from calcareous soil in the Tirolean Alps.
