= Emergosphaera =

Scientific classification
- Clade: Viridiplantae
- Division: Chlorophyta
- Class: Chlorophyceae
- Order: Chlamydomonadales
- Family: Chlorococcaceae
- Genus: Emergosphaera; W.W.Miller, 1921
- Species: E. superficialis

Binomial name
- Emergosphaera superficialis W.W.Miller

Genus of algae

Emergosphaera is a genus of green algae, in the family Chlorococcaceae. It contains a single species, Emergosphaera superficialis, recorded only once from Kursk, Russia. The vegetative cells of Emergosphaera are neustonic in freshwater and the zoospores are planktonic.
