= National Institute for Undersea Science and Technology =

Research organisation within NOAA

The National Institute for Undersea Science and Technology (NIUST) was established in 2002 within the National Oceanic and Atmospheric Administration (NOAA) to advance undersea research. NOAA's undersea research program is carried out through six regional research centers and a national institute based at academic institutions with established programs in marine science and technology.

== Background and activities ==
In 2001 NURP partnered with the University of Southern Mississippi and the University of Mississippi to form the National Institute for Undersea Science and Technology (NIUST).

NIUST is focused on national and global research issues, specifically on the development of new products from the sea and new technologies for exploring the sea's harsh and extreme environments. NIUST is composed of three Core Divisions: the Ocean Biotechnology Center & Repository (OBCR), established to create a national repository of marine organisms specifically for use by the biotechnology sector; the Seabed Technology Research Center (STRC), focused on the research and development of viable technologies for the operation and development of remote sensor and direct sampling technologies for the investigation of the deep sea; and the Undersea Vehicles Technology Center (UVTC), focused on the research and development of viable technologies for the operation and development of Remotely Operated Vehicles (ROVs) and Autonomous Underwater Vehicles (AUVs). Each NURC solicits proposals from the research community and awards funding only after the proposal has gone through a comprehensive peer review process and has been judged to be relevant to the mission of NURP and NOAA. The technology required to conduct the research is generally provided by NURP; however, it is often necessary to develop new technologies and methodologies. Scientific reviewers are often hesitant to provide research dollars for unproven concepts; so technology development is usually left to the larger institutions and research centers such as Woods Hole Oceanographic Institution, Monterey Bay Aquarium Research Institute, the Naval Underwater Warfare Fighting Center, and the Stennis Space Center.

== Autonomous Underwater Vehicles ==
The Eagle Ray AUV, an explorer class Autonomous Undersea Vehicle is owned and operated by NIUST out of Oxford, MS at the University of Mississippi Field Station.
