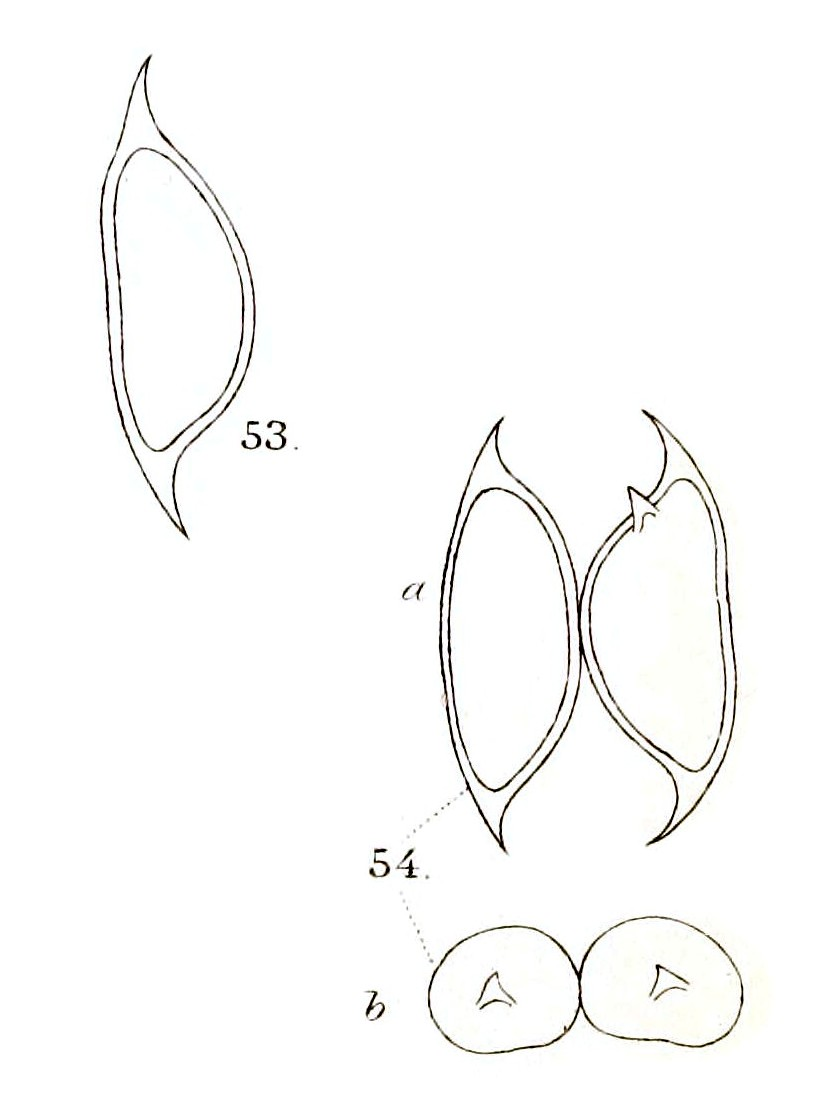
- Closteridium obesum

Scientific classification
- Clade: Viridiplantae
- Division: Chlorophyta
- Class: Chlorophyceae
- Order: Chlamydomonadales
- Family: Chlorococcaceae
- Genus: Closteridium; Reinsch, 1888

Type species
- Closteridium bengalicum

Species
- C. bengalicum

= Closteridium =

Genus of algae

Closteridium is a genus of green algae in the family Chlorococcaceae.
