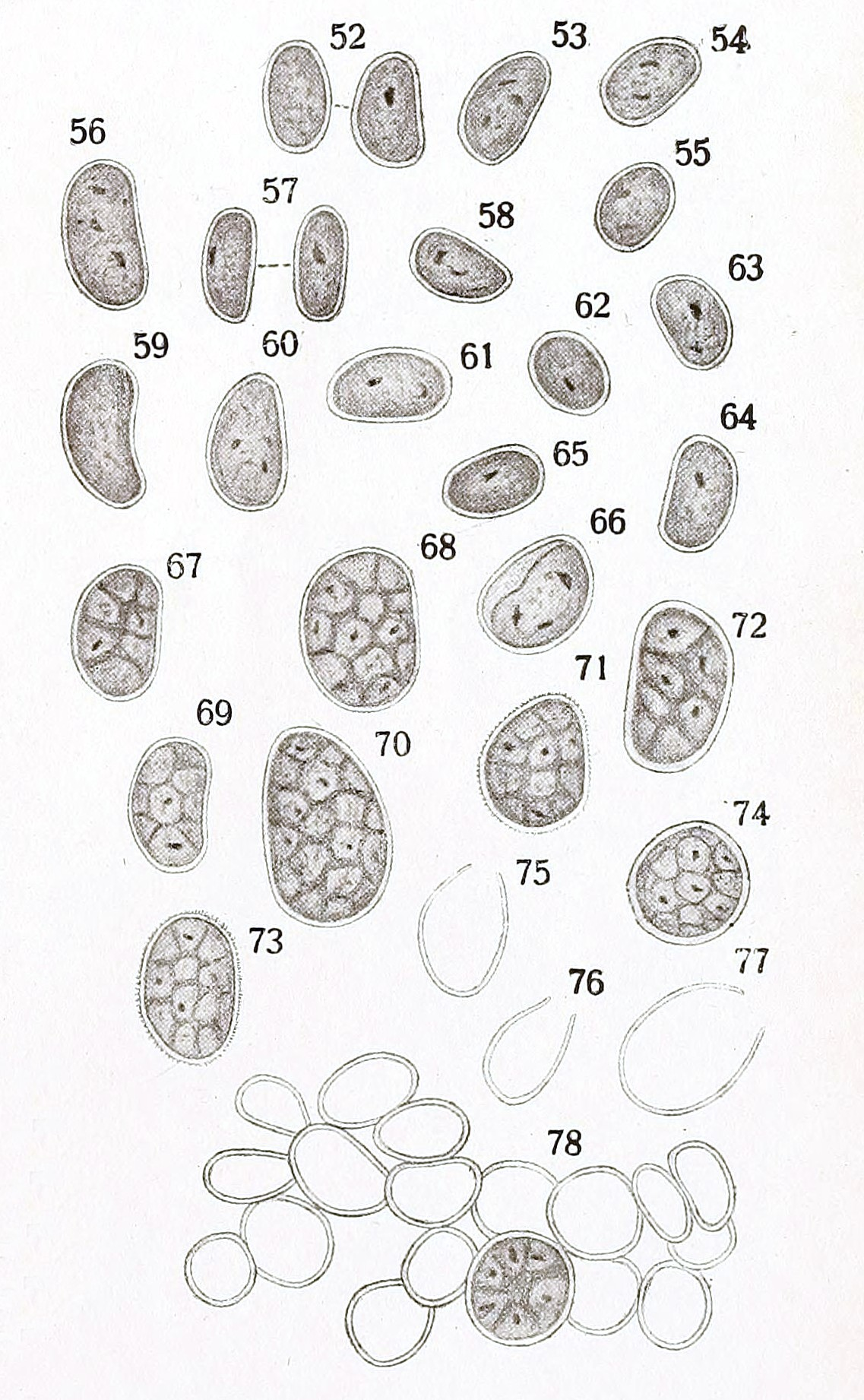

Scientific classification
- Kingdom: Plantae
- Division: Chlorophyta
- Class: Chlorophyceae
- Order: Chlamydomonadales
- Family: Chlorococcaceae
- Genus: Phaseolaria; Printz, 1921

Type species
- Phaseolaria obliqua

Species
- P. obliqua

= Phaseolaria =

Genus of algae

Phaseolaria is a genus of green algae, in the family Chlorococcaceae.
