= Neospongiococcum =

Scientific classification
- Clade: Viridiplantae
- Division: Chlorophyta
- Class: Chlorophyceae
- Order: Chlamydomonadales
- Family: Chlorococcaceae
- Genus: Neospongiococcum; Deason & E.R. Cox, 1971

Type species
- Neospongiococcum alabamense

Species
- N. alabamense; N. bipapillatum; N. commatiforme; N. concentricum; N. excentricum; N. gelatinosum; N. giganticum; N. macropyrenoidosum; N. mobile; N. munimentiferum; N. polymorphum; N. vacuolatum

Genus of algae

Neospongiococcum is a genus of green algae in the family Chlorococcaceae.
