= Pseudospongiococcum =

Scientific classification
- Clade: Viridiplantae
- Division: Chlorophyta
- Class: Chlorophyceae
- Order: Chlamydomonadales
- Family: Chlorococcaceae
- Genus: Pseudospongiococcum; Gromov & Mamkaeva
- Species: P. protococcoides

Binomial name
- Pseudospongiococcum protococcoides Gromov & Mamkaeva, 1974

Genus of algae

Pseudospongiococcum is a genus of green algae, in the family Chlorococcaceae, with the sole species Pseudospongiococcum protococcoides. It has been recorded only once, in soils in Crimea.
