= Chlorohippotes =

Scientific classification
- Clade: Viridiplantae
- Division: Chlorophyta
- Class: Chlorophyceae
- Order: Chlamydomonadales
- Family: Chlorococcaceae
- Genus: Chlorohippotes; R.H. Thompson ex R.H. Thompson et P. Timpano
- Species: C. tenax

Binomial name
- Chlorohippotes tenax R.H. Thompson ex R.H. Thompson et P. Timpano, 1984

Genus of algae

Chlorohippotes is a genus of green algae, in the family Chlorococcaceae. It contains a single species, Chlorohippotes tenax.

Chlorohippotes tenax is an obligate epiphyte on multicellular volvocalean algae, particularly Volvox and Eudorina.
