= Apodochloris =

Scientific classification
- Clade: Viridiplantae
- Division: Chlorophyta
- Class: Chlorophyceae
- Order: Chlamydomonadales
- Family: Chlorococcaceae
- Genus: Apodochloris; Komárek, 1959

Type species
- Apodochloris simplicissima

Species
- A. dinobryonis; A. polymorpha; A. simplicissima

Genus of algae

Apodochloris is a genus of green algae in the family Chlorococcaceae.
