= Ferricystis =

Scientific classification
- Clade: Viridiplantae
- Division: Chlorophyta
- Class: Chlorophyceae
- Order: Chlamydomonadales
- Family: Chlorococcaceae
- Genus: Ferricystis; F. Hindák 1988

Type species
- Ferricystis mucicola

Species
- F. mucicola

Genus of algae

Ferricystis is a genus of green algae in the family Chlorococcaceae.
