= Spongiochloris =

Scientific classification
- Clade: Viridiplantae
- Division: Chlorophyta
- Class: Chlorophyceae
- Order: Chlamydomonadales
- Family: Chlorococcaceae
- Genus: Spongiochloris; Starr, 1955

Species
- S. excentrica; S. gigantea; S. incrassata; S. lamellata; S. llanoensis; S. minor; S. spongiosa; S. typica

Genus of algae

Spongiochloris is a genus of green algae, in the family Chlorococcaceae.
