= Pseudoplanophila =

Scientific classification
- Clade: Viridiplantae
- Division: Chlorophyta
- Class: Chlorophyceae
- Order: Chlamydomonadales
- Family: Chlorococcaceae
- Genus: Pseudoplanophila; Ettl & Gärtner, 1987
- Species: P. sphagnothermalis

Binomial name
- Pseudoplanophila sphagnothermalis (Pascher) Ettl & Gärtner

Genus of algae

Pseudoplanophila is a genus of green algae, in the family Chlorococcaceae. It contains a single species, Pseudoplanophila sphagnothermalis.
