= Skujaster =

Scientific classification
- Clade: Viridiplantae
- Division: Chlorophyta
- Class: Chlorophyceae
- Order: Chlamydomonadales
- Family: Chlorococcaceae
- Genus: Skujaster; D.G.Vodenicarov, 1989
- Species: S. asteriferus

Binomial name
- Skujaster asteriferus (Fott) Vodenicarov, 1989

Synonyms
- Neglectella asterifera Fott; Oocystis asterifera Fott

Genus of algae

Skujaster is a genus of green algae, in the family Chlorococcaceae, containing a single species, Skujaster asteriferus.
