= Emergococcus =

Scientific classification
- Clade: Viridiplantae
- Division: Chlorophyta
- Class: Chlorophyceae
- Order: Chlamydomonadales
- Family: Chlorococcaceae
- Genus: Emergococcus; W.W.Miller, 1921
- Species: E. lucens

Binomial name
- Emergococcus lucens W.W.Miller

Genus of algae

Emergococcus is a genus of green algae, in the family Chlorococcaceae. It contains a single species, Emergococcus lucens. It is neustonic in fresh water.
