= Cystomonas =

Scientific classification
- Kingdom: Plantae
- Division: Chlorophyta
- Class: Chlorophyceae
- Order: Chlamydomonadales
- Family: Chlorococcaceae
- Genus: Cystomonas; H. Ettl & G. Gaertner, 1987

Type species
- Cystomonas actinosphaerii

Species
- C. actinosphaerii; C. indica; C. starrii

Genus of algae

Cystomonas is a genus of green algae in the family Chlorococcaceae.
