= Valkanoviella =

Scientific classification
- Clade: Viridiplantae
- Division: Chlorophyta
- Class: Chlorophyceae
- Order: Chlamydomonadales
- Family: Chlorococcaceae
- Genus: Valkanoviella; Bourrelly
- Species: V. vaucheriae

Binomial name
- Valkanoviella vaucheriae Bourrelly

Genus of algae

Valkanoviella is a monotypic genus of green algae, in the family Chlorococcaceae. It only contains one known species, Valkanoviella vaucheriae Bourrelly, 1965.

The genus was circumscribed by Pierre Paul Charles Bourrelly in Rev. Algol. ser.2, vol.8 on page 65 in 1965.

The genus name of Valkanoviella is in honour of Alexander Konstantinov Valkanov (1904–1971), who was a Bulgarian zoologist and Hydrobiologist (Mycology, Algology and Protistology). From 1942 - 196,3 he was a teacher at the Marine Biology Station in Varna, Bulgaria. Also in 1953, he was Professor at the Zoological Institute and Museum of the Bulgarian Academy of Sciences in Sofia.
