= Fasciculochloris =

Scientific classification
- Kingdom: Plantae
- Division: Chlorophyta
- Class: Chlorophyceae
- Order: Chlamydomonadales
- Family: Chlorococcaceae
- Genus: Fasciculochloris; R.J.McLean & Trainor, 1965

Species
- Fasciculochloris boldii; Fasciculochloris mexicana

Genus of algae

Fasciculochloris is a genus of green algae in the family Chlorococcaceae.

== Development and Division ==
Young vegetative cells begin oblong and oval shaped, but eventually become rounded and spherical after aging. Cell division has a chance of resulting in production of zoospores. If the cell is vegetative, division may result in the formation of packets, most likely four, but can get up to thirty-two cells in two/three planes.
