= Chlorococcum =

Scientific classification
- Kingdom: Plantae
- Division: Chlorophyta
- Class: Chlorophyceae
- Order: Chlamydomonadales
- Family: Chlorococcaceae
- Genus: Chlorococcum; Meneghini

Type species
- Chlorococcum infusionum (Schrank) Meneghini

Species
- See text.

Genus of algae

Chlorococcum is a genus of green algae, in the family Chlorococcaceae. The alga may be useful in the flocculation of lipids from wastewater. It can be found in fresh water, but is more commonly found in soil or subaerial habitats (such as growing on tree bark, wood, stones, or plaster).

Chlorococcum consists of spherical cells which are single or sometimes borne in small clusters; when colonial, there is sometimes a thin layer of mucilage. Cells contain a single cup-shaped, parietal chloroplast with one pyrenoid.

Chlorococcum reproduces by the formation of autospores or zoospores. The zoospores have two flagella of equal length. Chlorococcum was traditionally defined using morphological characteristics. However, using molecular phylogenetics, the genus was found to be polyphyletic. Therefore, the genus was revised, with several new genera split off (e.g. Alvikia).

== Species ==
As of February 2022, AlgaeBase accepted the following species:

- Chlorococcum acidum P.A.Archibald & Bold
- Chlorococcum aegyptiacum P.A.Archibald
- Chlorococcum aerium (R.M.Brown & Bold) Wanatabe & Lewis
- Chlorococcum africanum Reinsch
- Chlorococcum amblystomatis (F.D.Lambert ex N.Wille) N.Correia, J.Varela & Leonel Pereira
- Chlorococcum aquaticum P.A.Archibald
- Chlorococcum botryoides (Kützing) Rabenhorst
- Chlorococcum chlorococcoides (Korshikov) Philipose
- Chlorococcum choloepodis (J.Kühn) D.E.Wujek & P.Timpano
- Chlorococcum citriforme P.A.Archibald & Bold
- Chlorococcum costatozygotum Ettl & Gärtner
- Chlorococcum diplobionticum Herndon
- Chlorococcum echinozygotum R.C.Starr
- Chlorococcum elbense P.A.Archibald
- Chlorococcum elkhartiense P.A.Archibald & Bold
- Chlorococcum ellipsoideum Deason & Bold
- Chlorococcum endozoicum Collins
- Chlorococcum fissum P.A.Archibald & Bold
- Chlorococcum hypnosporum Starr
- Chlorococcum infusionum (Schrank) Meneghini
- Chlorococcum isabeliense P.A.Archibald & Bold
- Chlorococcum lobatum (Korshikov) F.E.Fritsch & R.P.John
- Chlorococcum macropyrenoidosum (Deason & Ed.R.Cox) Shin Watanabe & L.A.Lewis
- Chlorococcum macrostigmatum R.C.Starr
- Chlorococcum microstigmatum P.A.Archibald & Bold
- Chlorococcum minimum Ettl & Gärtner
- Chlorococcum minutum R.C.Starr
- Chlorococcum nivale P.A.Archibald
- Chlorococcum novae-angliae P.A.Archibald & Bold
- Chlorococcum oleofaciens Trainor & Bold
- Chlorococcum olivaceum (Rabenhorst) Rabenhorst
- Chlorococcum pamirum P.A.Archibald
- Chlorococcum papillatum Demczenko
- Chlorococcum pinguideum Arce & Bold
- Chlorococcum pleiopyrenigerum (L.Moewus) Ettl & Gärtner
- Chlorococcum pseudodictyosphaerium Metting
- Chlorococcum pyrenoidosum P.A.Archibald
- Chlorococcum rugosum P.A.Archibald & Bold
- Chlorococcum salinum Archibald
- Chlorococcum schizochlamys (Korshikov) Philipose
- Chlorococcum schwarzii Ettl & Gärtner
- Chlorococcum sphagni P.A.Dangeard
- Chlorococcum submarinum Ålvik
- Chlorococcum tatrense P.A.Archibald
- Chlorococcum turfosum (Shin Watanabe & L.A.Lewis) Nakada, Shin Watanabe & L.A.Lewis
- Chlorococcum vacuolatum R.C.Starr
- Chlorococcum vitiosum Printz
