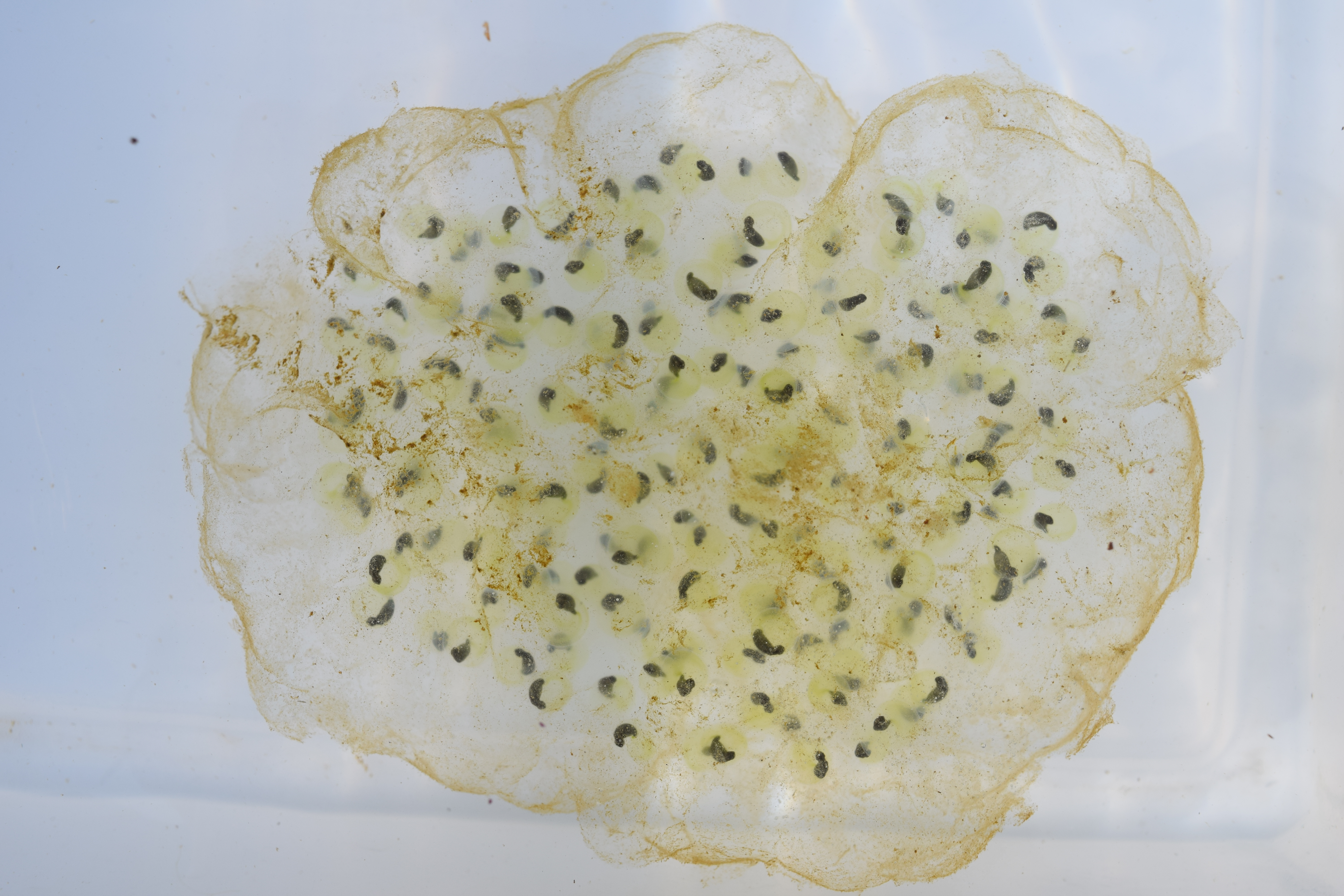
- Ambystoma maculatum egg mass at the University of Mississippi Field Station. Symbiotic Oophila amblystomatis algae (green) is visible surrounding each developing larva.

Scientific classification
- Kingdom: Plantae
- Division: Chlorophyta
- Class: Chlorophyceae
- Order: Chlamydomonadales
- Family: Chlorococcaceae; Blackman & Tansley, 1902

Genera
- See text.

= Chlorococcaceae =

Family of algae

Chlorococcaceae is a family of green algae, in the order Chlamydomonadales. They are mostly soil-dwelling algae. Many members of this group produce lipids and secondary carotenoids.

The Chlorococcaceae consists mostly of coccoid (single, nonmotile) cells with one parietal or central chloroplast and one or multiple nuclei. The chloroplast contains a single pyrenoid surrounded by a starch envelope. The cell envelope may thicken with age and develop into a mucilaginous stalk in some species. Reproduction consists of zoospores with a cell wall; after they stop swimming, the zoospores retain their shape.

The family Chlorococcaceae is currently under taxonomic revision. As currently circumscribed, the type genus Chlorococcum is polyphyletic. The type species, Chlorococcum infusionum, is a member of the clade Moewusinia.

== List of genera ==
- Apodochloris
- Athroocystis
- Axilococcus
- Borodinellopsis
- Chlorococcum
- Chlorohippotes
- Closteridium
- Cystococcus
- Cystomonas
- Emergococcus
- Emergosphaera
- Eubrownia
- Fasciculochloris
- Ferricystis
- Kentrosphaeropsis
- Lautosphaeria
- Nautococcus
- Neglectellopsis
- Neospongiococcum
- Octogoniella
- Phaseolaria
- Pseudodictyococcus
- Pseudoplanophila
- Pseudospongiococcum
- Pseudotrochiscia
- Radiosphaera
- Skujaster
- Spongiochloris
- Spongiococcum
- †Syndesmorion
- Tetracystis
- Torgia
- Ulotrichella
- Valeriella
- Valkanoviella
