= University of Mississippi Field Station =

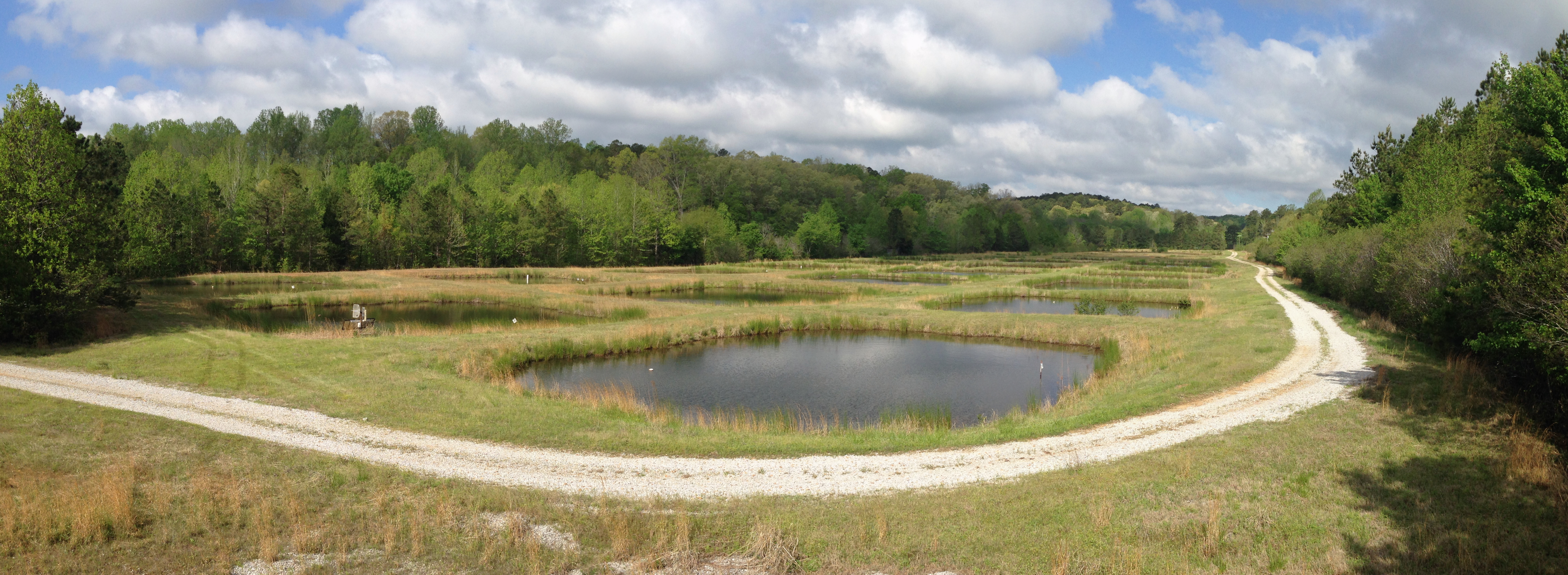

- Location within Mississippi
- Location: Lafayette County, Mississippi, United States
- Nearest city: Oxford, MS
- Coordinates: 34.4326°N 89.3905°W
- Area: 787 acres (318 ha)
- Established: May 1986
- Governing body: University of Mississippi
- Website: fieldstation.olemiss.edu

The University of Mississippi Field Station (UMFS) is a 787-acre (318 ha) off-campus research and education complex located in Lafayette County, Mississippi about 8 miles (13 km) northeast of downtown Oxford and operated by the University of Mississippi.

== History ==
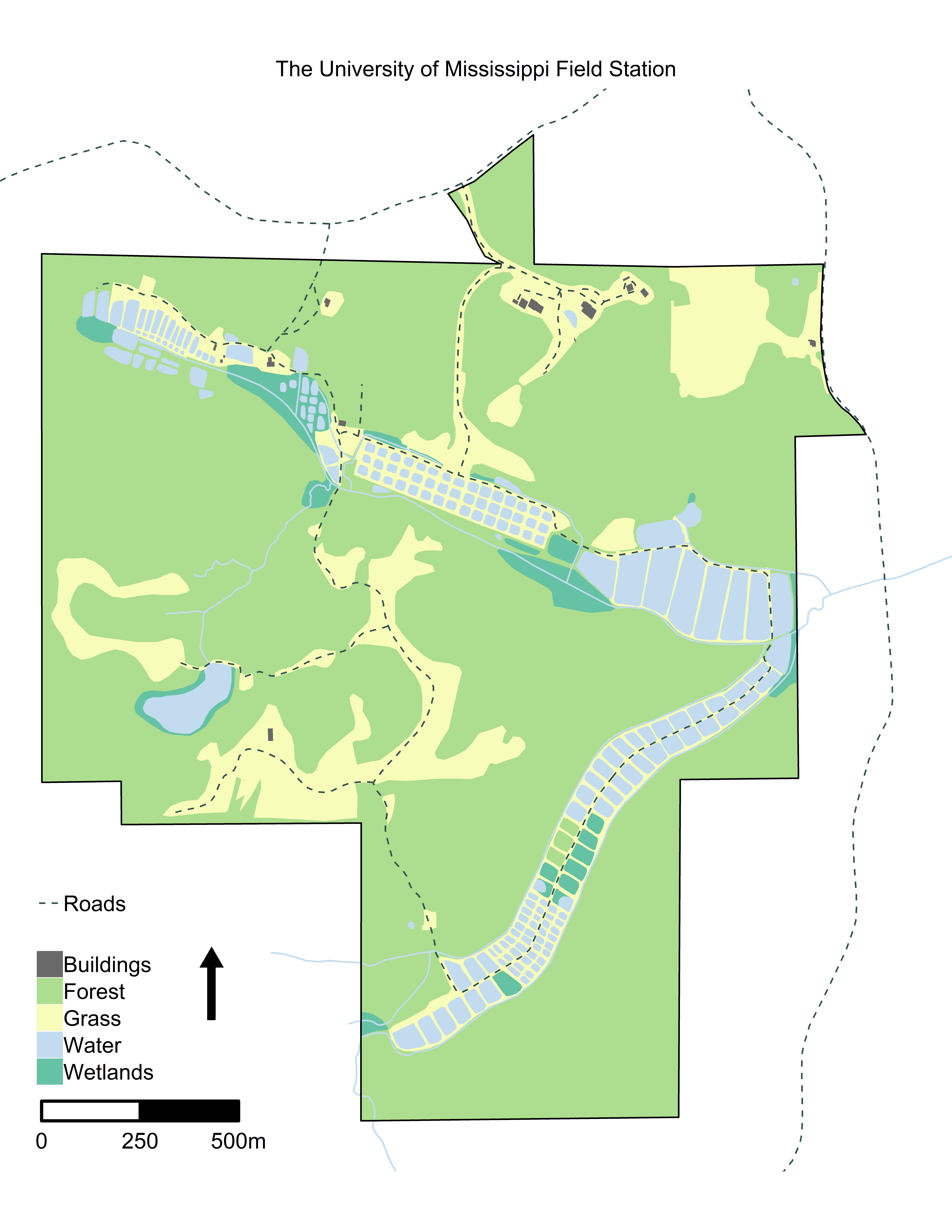
Map of UMFS

In July 1947, the area that is now the UMFS opened as Ole Miss Fisheries, Inc., a fish farm that later became Minnows Incorporated and operated by the Herbert Kohn Corporation. The fish farm comprised 165 acres (67 ha) of bottomland along the Bay Springs Branch of Puskus Creek that was purchased from the Hickey family. The original ponds were irregularly arranged, filled from springs through pipes in the levees, and emptied via standpipes in the corner of each pond. After the original ponds, newer ponds had concrete outlet structures for drainage, and most current ponds have PVC standpipes. At its peak, the fish farm produced three million to four million fish per year. Eighty percent of these fish were golden shiners, and the rest were goldfish. After the construction of the first set of ponds, the area alongside an unnamed stream stretching about 1 mile (1.6 km) southwest of Bay Springs Branch was dynamited for drainage and cleared of timber. An additional 65 ponds were constructed here in a double row and the stream rerouted so that it flowed in two channels on the sides of the valley. Attempts were made to raise trout, but these were not successful due to their low temperature requirements and the low levels dissolved substances in the water at UMFS. Additional attempts to raise American bullfrogs were also not successful, possibly due to predation on the tadpoles or the spread of disease in confined spaces. Grazing cattle, along with the fish farm's crew, maintained low levels of vegetation growth around the ponds.In the early 1980s, the farm ceased operations and was sold to Weyerhaeuser where it remained fallow for two to three years, during which time much of the area became overgrown with vegetation.

In 1985 the University of Mississippi acquired the property in a land trade with Weyerhaeuser and converted seven of the original ponds into 45 0.1 acres (0.040 ha) ponds with uniform surface areas and depths. On the southwestern side of the UMFS ten ponds were likewise converted to forty shallow, uniform ponds. The Natural Resources Conservation Service partially funded the construction of eight wetland cells at the western end of the field station. This construction resulted in 220 ponds covering with 90 acres (36 ha) of water at UMFS. However, today there are around 190 ponds, several of which are dry and some of which have been combined into a single pond due to beaver activity. The Mississippi National Guard Engineering Company C constructed the 45 0.1-acre (0.040 ha) ponds and a house for the field station's manager during two summer camps in 1990 and 1991. The UMFS was dedicated in May 1986 as the University of Mississippi Biological Field Station ("biological" was later dropped from the name) and encompassed approximately 500 acres (200 ha). An additional 220 acres (89 ha) encompassing what was known as the old Bramlett farm were purchased, and in April 1996 15 acres (6.1 ha) were acquired to provide access to new laboratory, office, and maintenance buildings that were completed in 1998. In 2013 41.36 acres (16.74 ha) were added to the field station to protect against encroachment.

Several agencies have or continue to support projects at the field station including the Mississippi Department of Wildlife, Fisheries and Parks, USDA Agricultural Research Service National Sedimentation Laboratory, Natural Resources Conservation Service, Peace Corps, Shell Development Corporation, Zoecon, ABC Laboratories, Mississippi Mineral Resources Institute, and Research Institute of Pharmaceutical Sciences.

== Geography and geology ==
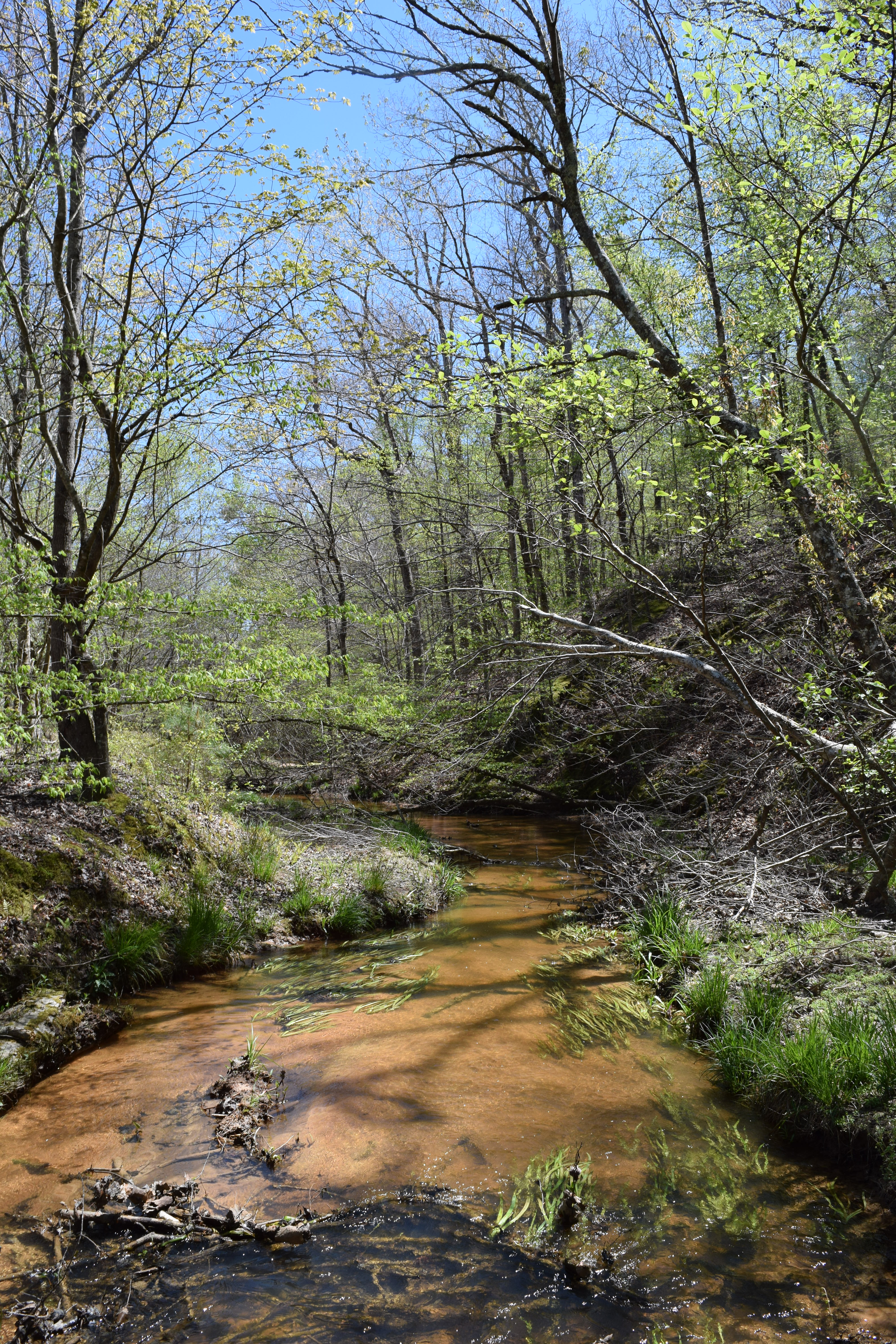
Bay Springs Branch

The UMFS encompasses 781 acres (316 ha) of the Eocene hills of the interior Gulf Coastal Plain along the headwater streams of the Little Tallahatchie River. The ponds at the field station are located within a v-shaped valley originally formed by two streams: Bay Springs Branch and an unnamed stream that flows into Bay Springs Branch. Just outside the field station's boundary, Bay Springs Branch flows into Puskus Creek, which flows into Puskus Lake before continuing on to the Little Tallahatchie River. Bay Springs Branch originally flowed along the north side of the valley, but after construction of the ponds it was rerouted to the south side, and now a smaller stream flows along part of the valley's north side. Likewise, the unnamed stream was also rerouted along with pond construction so that now there are two nearly identical streams along each side of the valley on the south side of the field station. Bay Springs Branch splits on the west side of the field station, with one fork flowing from the ponds around Bay Springs Baptist Church and another flowing from a single pond on the west-central side of the field station.

The UMFS is within the designated borders of Holly Springs National Forest, although none of the directly adjoining land is managed or owned by the U.S. Forest Service. The soils at the field station are primarily sandy and sandy-loam soils. The soils were originally primarily loess but were severely degraded from forest clearing and poor agricultural practices that occurred after European settlement in 1832. There are several springs in the area that provide a year-round supply of water to the field station's streams and ponds. Elevations range from just under 400 feet (120 m) above sea level along the lower section of Bay Springs Branch to over 540 feet (160 m) on the northern edge of the field station.

== Ecology ==
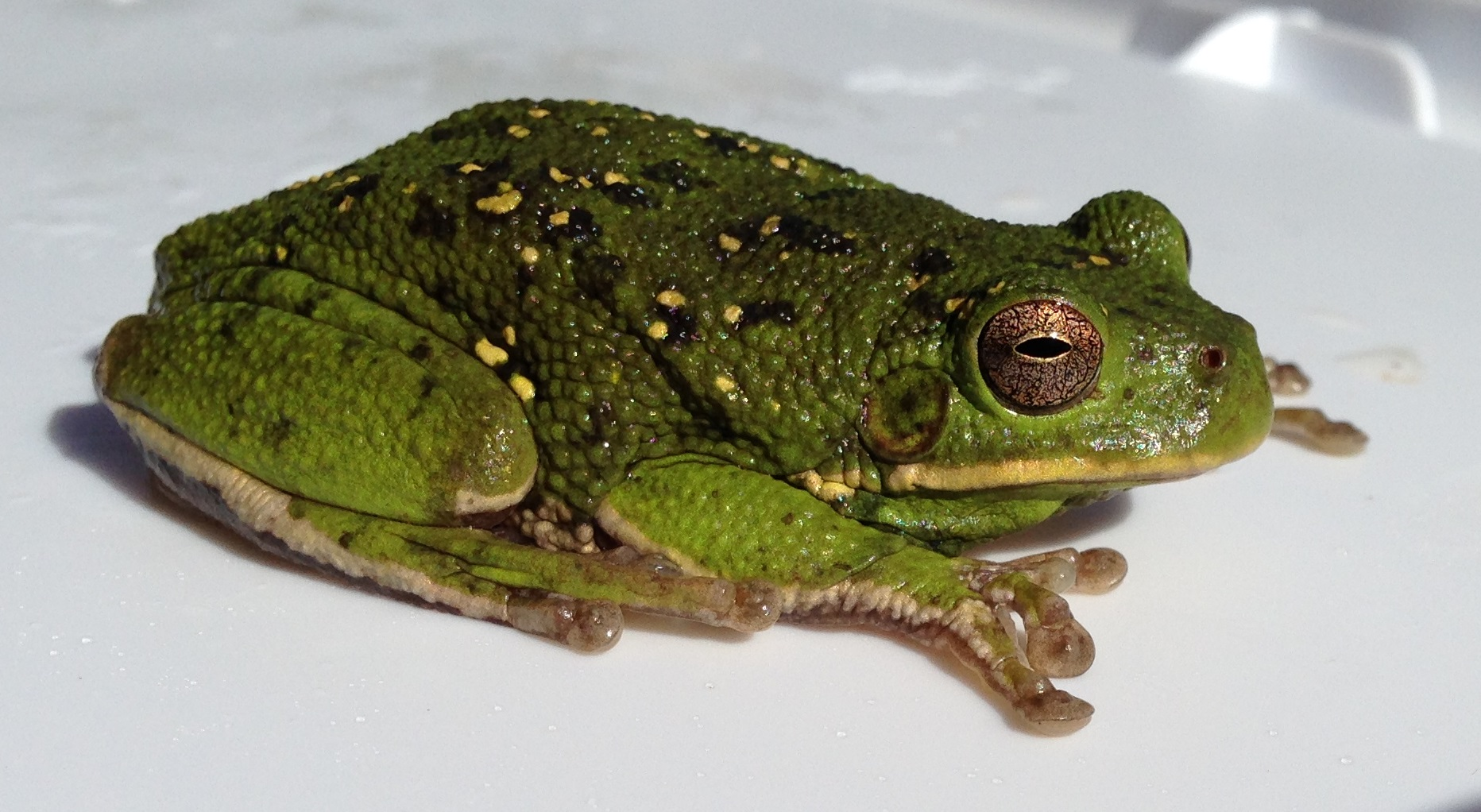
Adult male Hyla gratiosa at UMFS

The UMFS is in the Northern Hilly Gulf Coastal Plain level IV ecoregion, within the Southeastern Plains level III, Southeastern USA Plains level II, and Eastern Temperate Forests Level I ecoregions. In addition to ponds, habitats include wetlands, mowed fields, and closed canopy mixed forests. Long-term vegetation monitoring plots were established in 1996 following a severe ice storm in 1994 and a pine bark beetle infestation in 1995. There are 345 species of vascular plants, 132 aquatic beetles, 43 aquatic and semiaquatic Heteroptera, 16 frogs, 12 salamanders, 25 snakes, 10 turtles, 9 lizards, and 55 butterflies that have been observed at the field station.

The Yazoo darter (Etheostoma raneyi), a fish endemic to headwater streams of the Tallahatchie and Yocona river systems of north Mississippi, can be found at the field station. The cottonmouth is the most common snake, having been estimated as being fourteen times more common than the next most common snake species. American alligators have rarely been reported, although none of these reports have been verified with photographs or captured individuals.

== Research and education ==
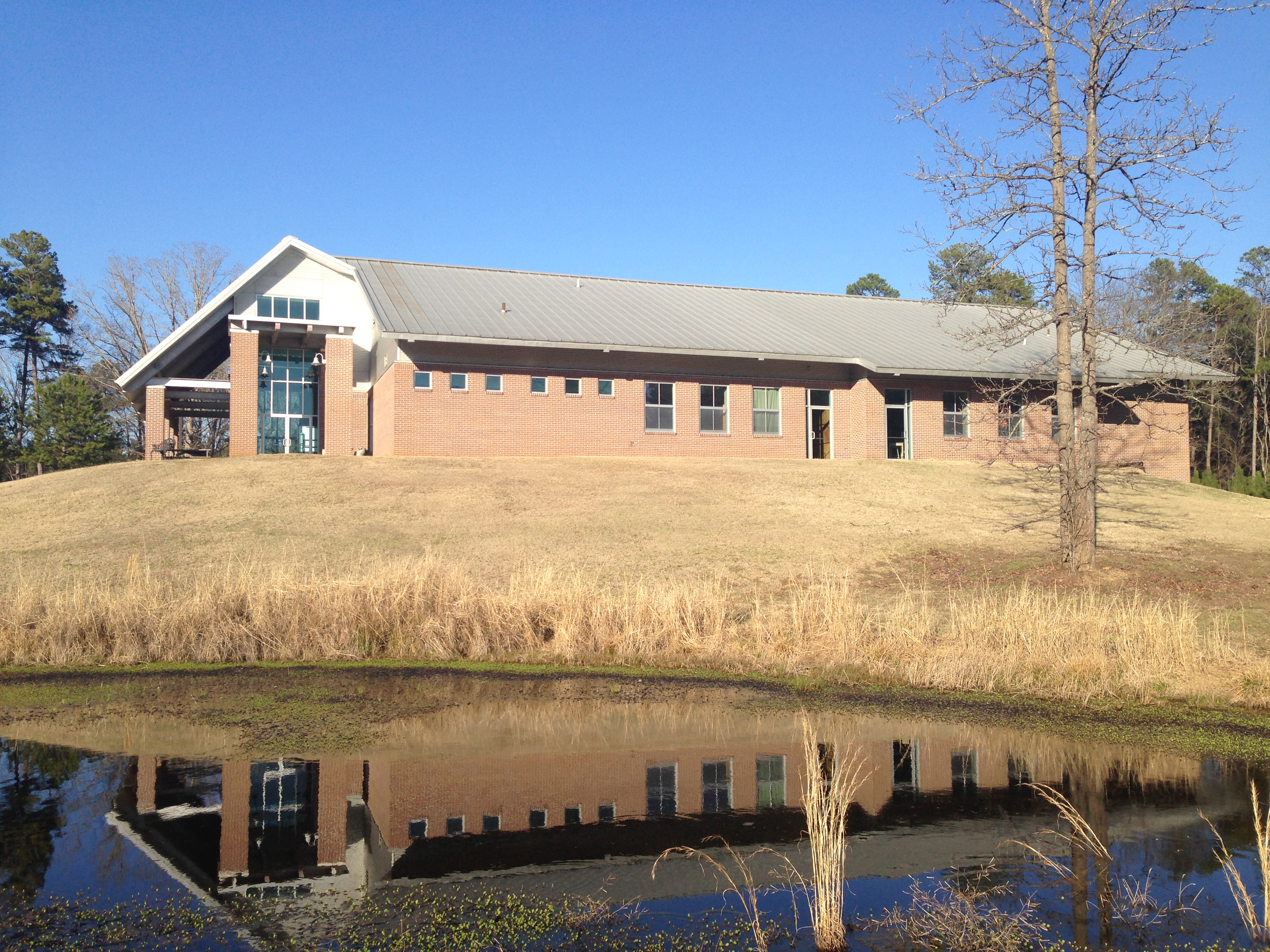
Education building at UMFS

Research and education facilities include two buildings with offices and laboratories, a greenhouse, a wild turkey aviary, an education building with an auditorium, teaching laboratories, and offices, and a cabin for visiting researchers. The field station hosts field trips for elementary through college courses, with about 2000 visitors per year, including an annual summer ecology day camp for children in grades 2-6. The UMFS is a member of the Organization of Biological Field Stations. Part of the National Institute for Undersea Science and Technology was based at the field station.
