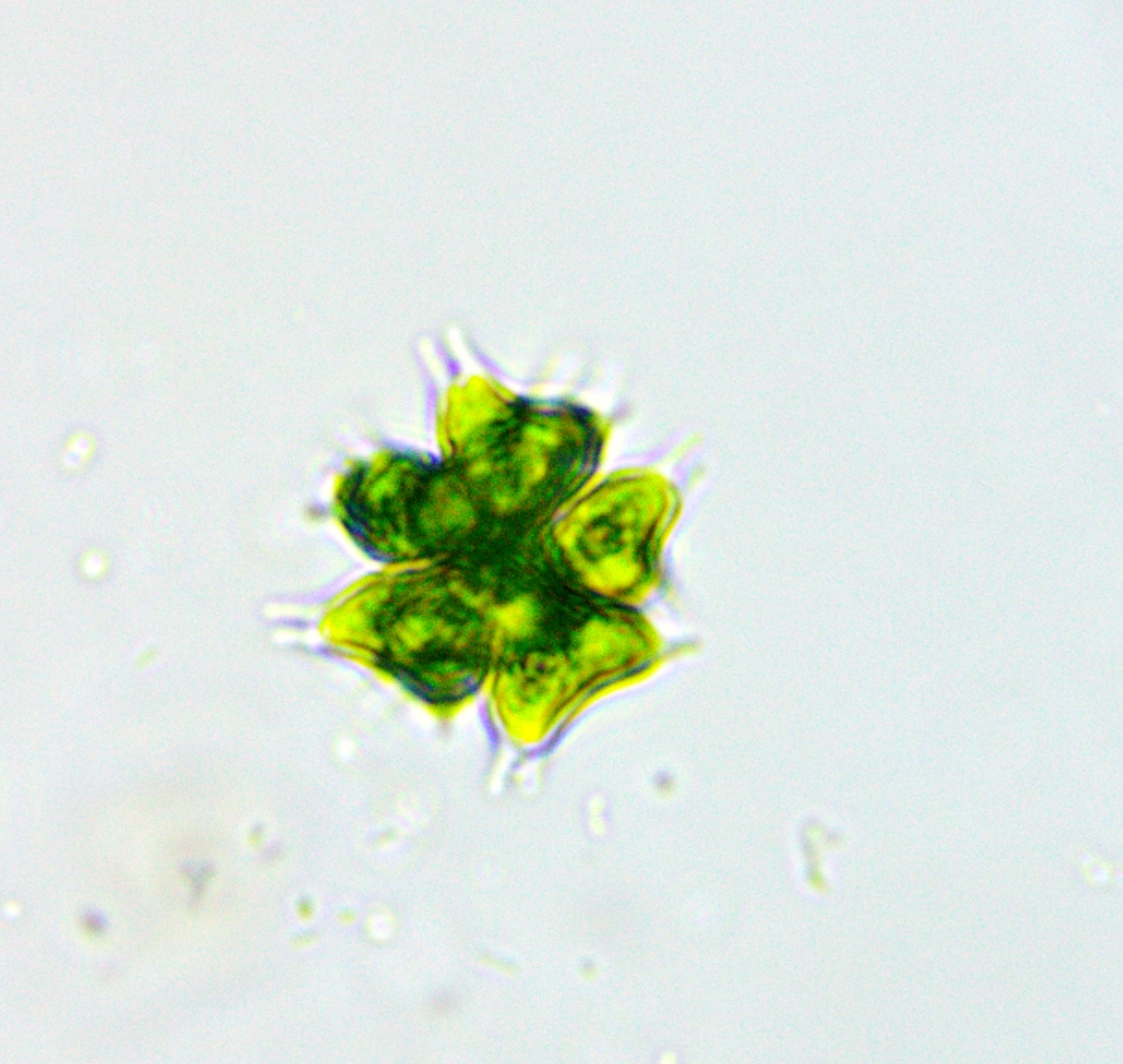
- Sorastrum spinulosum

Scientific classification
- Kingdom: Plantae
- Division: Chlorophyta
- Class: Chlorophyceae
- Order: Sphaeropleales
- Family: Hydrodictyaceae
- Genus: Sorastrum; Kützing

Type species
- Sorastrum echinatum (Meneghini) Kützing

Species
- Sorastrum spinulosum; Sorastrum americanum; Sorastrum sp. UTEX LB 785

= Sorastrum =

Genus of algae

Sorastrum is a genus of green algae in the family Hydrodictyaceae. It is a component of the phytoplankton of freshwater ponds, lakes, and ditches. Sorastrum is common in tropical to temperate regions of the world, but due to its small size it is often overlooked.

The genus was named by Friedrich Traugott Kützing and comes from the Ancient Greek terms σωρός (sōrós, "heap") and ἄστρον (astron, "star").

== Description ==
Sorastrum forms spherical colonies of 8 to 128 cells. Individual cells are kidney-shaped, pear-shaped, or wedge-shaped, or spherical (in Sorastrum sphericum) and attached to a central body of mucilage via gelatinous strands. On each cell there are two to four outwardly pointing spines. Each cell contains a single chloroplast with a one pyrenoid.

Identification of species depends on the size and shape of the cells, particularly the spines.

== Reproduction ==
Reproduction occurs asexually, by zoospores. Zoospores have two flagella each and are formed by the repeated division of the protoplast. Once divided, the zoospores are released from a tear in the mother cell wall. Sexual reproduction has not been observed in Sorastrum, but is presumed to be similar to that of Hydrodictyon and Pediastrum.
