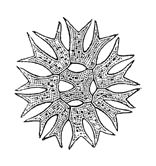

Scientific classification
- Kingdom: Plantae
- Division: Chlorophyta
- Class: Chlorophyceae
- Order: Sphaeropleales
- Family: Hydrodictyaceae
- Genus: Parapediastrum; E.Hegewald, 2005

Type species
- Parapediastrum biradiatum (Meyen) E.Hegewald

Species
- Parapediastrum biradiatum

= Parapediastrum =

Genus of algae

Parapediastrum is a genus of green algae in the family Hydrodictyaceae. It is fairly common in freshwater regions throughout the world.

Parapediastrum forms flat, disc-shaped colonies, termed coenobia, of cells in powers of two, usually four, eight, 16, or 32. Marginal cells are divided into two lobes, which are each further divided into two lobes, making four lobes total. This distinguishes it from Pediastrum and other genera, which have marginal cells with one or two lobes that are never subdivided further. Internal cells are two- or four-lobed. There are inter-cellular spaces between the cells. Cells have one chloroplast filling the cell, each with a single pyrenoid.

In 2005, molecular phylogenetic analyses showed that Pediastrum sensu lato was paraphyletic with respect to Hydrodictyon. Therefore, Pediastrum was split up into several genera, including Parapediastrum.
