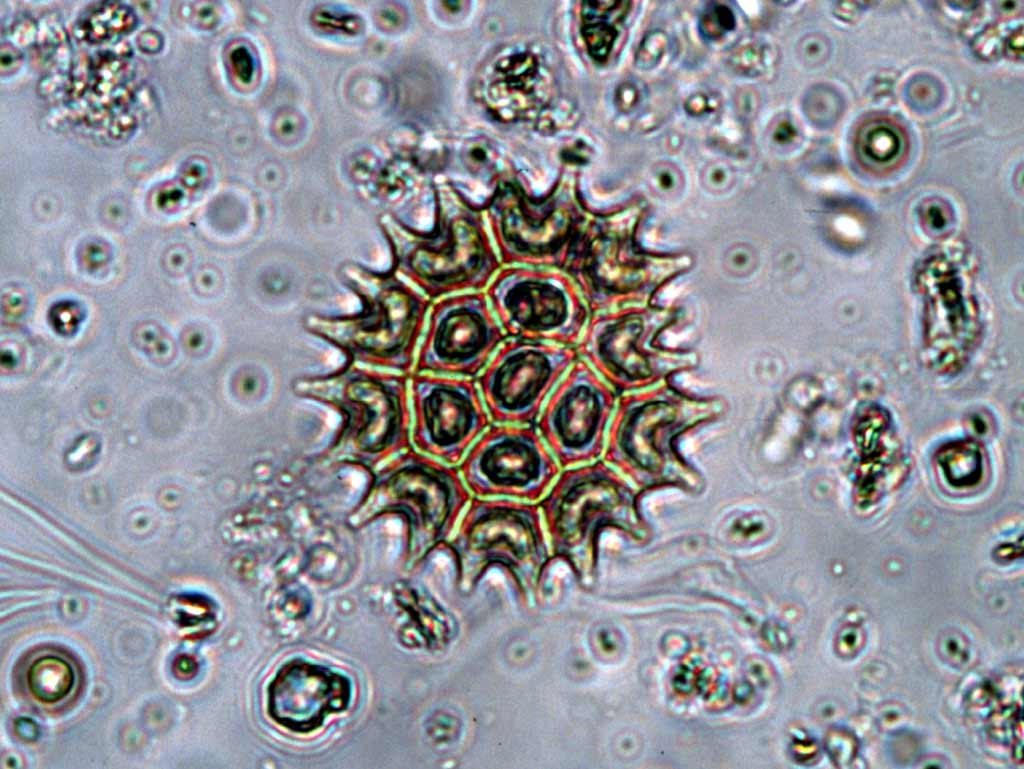
- Pseudopediastrum boryanum

Scientific classification
- Kingdom: Plantae
- Division: Chlorophyta
- Class: Chlorophyceae
- Order: Sphaeropleales
- Family: Hydrodictyaceae
- Genus: Pseudopediastrum
- Species: P. boryanum

Binomial name
- Pseudopediastrum boryanum (Turpin) E.Hegewald

Synonyms
- Helierella boryana Turpin; Pediastrum boryanum (Turpin) Meneghini

= Pseudopediastrum boryanum =

Species of green algae

Pseudopediastrum boryanum is a species of green algae in the family Hydrodictyaceae. It is a freshwater, microscopic alga with has a cosmopolitan distribution. It is most commonly found in eutrophic waters, but may also be found in brackish water or oligo- or mesotrophic mountain water bodies.

== Description ==
Pseudopediastrum boryanum consists of colonies of four, eight, 16, 32, or 64 cells (termed coenobia), which are arranged in a flat, star-like disc. Coenobia are typically 25–180 μm wide. The inner cells of the coenobium are polygonal, typically 6–20 μm and 5.7–22.5 μm. The marginal cells of the coenobium are typically 8–30 μm and 9–21 μm wide and are slightly to deeply notched, forming two projections; the two projections are up to as long as the rest of the cells and lie parallel to each other. The cell wall is reticulate and is covered in granules situated at the corners of a triangular mesh; it is highly resistant to decay due to the presence of sporopollenin.

Pseudopediastrum boryanum, like related species, typically reproduces asexually by forming zoospores within the parental cell wall; the zoospores then join to form new coenobia. Sexual reproduction occurs and is isogamous, but only occurs rarely.

== Taxonomy ==
Pseudopediastrum boryanum was first described in 1828 by Pierre Jean François Turpin, who named it Helierella boryana. Later in 1840, it was transferred to the genus Pediastrum by Giuseppe Giovanni Antonio Meneghini. In 2005, based on genetic data, Buchheim et al. found Pediastrum to be non-monophyletic and split the genus into several genera; Pediastrum boryanum was transferred to Pseudopediastrum.

Throughout its taxonomic history, Pseudopediastrum boryanum (as its synonym, Pediastrum boryanum) has had multiple infraspecific taxa; however, taxonomists differed widely in terms of the number of accepted varieties and relevant morphological features. In 2020, a study found that these varieties constituted a species complex with overlapping morphological characters; the most diagnostic features for distinguishing them are the shape of marginal cells and the density of granules on the cell walls.

== Fossil record ==
The cell walls of Pseudopediastrum boryanum are resistant to decay, and are therefore often found as subfossils in lake sediments. Although Pediastrum sensu lato species are often used as paleoecological indicators, P. boryanum is generally not useful as an indicator because it is very common and represents a species complex.
