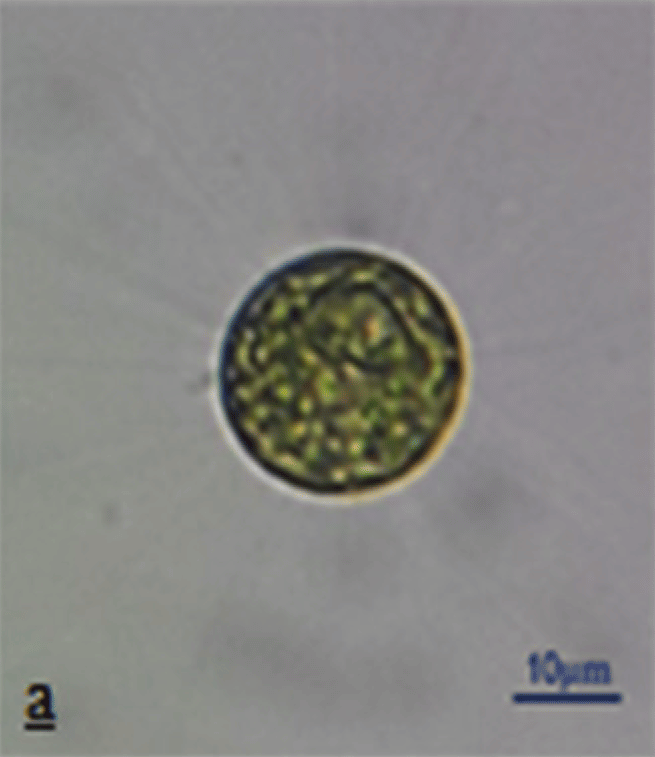
- Golenkinia radiata

Scientific classification
- Domain: Eukaryota
- Supergroup: Archaeplastida
- Clade: Viridiplantae
- Division: Chlorophyta
- Class: Chlorophyceae
- Order: Sphaeropleales
- Family: Neochloridaceae
- Genus: Golenkinia; Chodat, 1894

Type species
- Golenkinia radiata Chodat

Species
- Golenkinia aculeata; Golenkinia brevispina; Golenkinia longispicula; Golenkinia loricata; Golenkinia paucispina; Golenkinia radiata; Golenkinia viridis

= Golenkinia =

Genus of algae

Golenkinia is a genus of green algae first described in 1894 by Robert Chodat. The genus is named for the Russian phycologist Mikhail Iljitsch Golenkin. Golenkinia species live in fresh water (including bodies of black water such as Winyah Bay) and are found around the world.

== Description ==
Members of Golenkinia are spherical unicellular organisms with numerous radiating spines. They contain a single walled cup-shaped chloroplast, which in turn contains a pyrenoid in its base. The pyrenoid is typically sheathed in starch. The pyrenoid is usually reniform, which distinguishes them from members of the similar and taxonomically-confused genus Golenkiniopsis.

Species of Golenkinia are typically solitary and do not form colonies or coenobia except under laboratory conditions. Their slender spines may become entangled, creating the false impression that the algae have formed a colony.

== Taxonomic status ==
The precise taxonomic status of Golenkinia is somewhat unclear due to the large number of revisions it has undergone. It has traditionally been classed with other round, spine-bearing green algae, many of which are now assigned to the class Trebouxiophyceae.

In 1982, Hanuš Ettl and Jiří Komárek placed Golenkinia with Chlorotetraedron and Polyedriopsis in the family Neochloridaceae, under the order Sphaeropleales. In 1983, Komárek and Bohuslav Fott created the family Golenkiniaceae to contain unicellular algae with round cells that had spines on the cell wall. The genera Golenkinia and Polyedriopsis were placed within it.

Subsequent analysis of 18S rDNA in 2003 has found that Golenkinia and Polyedriopsis are not in fact closely related. The same research assigned Golenkinia to the order Chlamydomonadales.

Further analysis in 2015 found that Golenkinia was loosely related to Jenufa and Treubaria, all together possibly representing a branch in Chlamydomonadales that would be a sister clade to order Sphaeropleales. This proposed clade remains unnamed, and its taxonomy is still not completely clear, despite further rDNA analysis performed in 2017.

Because of the frequent changes to its classification, some databases still show Golenkinia belonging to Golenkiniaceae.
