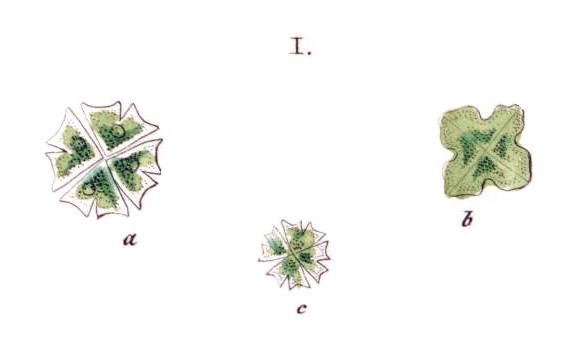
- Stauridium tetras

Scientific classification
- Kingdom: Plantae
- Division: Chlorophyta
- Class: Chlorophyceae
- Order: Sphaeropleales
- Family: Hydrodictyaceae
- Genus: Stauridium; Corda, 1839

Type species
- Stauridium tetras (Ehrenberg) E.Hegewald

Species
- Stauridium tetras; Stauridium privum

= Stauridium =

Genus of algae

Stauridium is a genus of green algae in the family Hydrodictyaceae. It is very common in freshwater regions throughout the world.

== Description ==
Stauridium forms flat colonies, termed coenobia, of cells in powers of two, usually four, eight, or 16. Coenobia are disc-shaped in outline, composed of cells laid contiguously next to each other with no spaces in between cells. The marginal cells are trapezoidal, with (in S. tetras) or without (in S. privum) a V-shaped incision in the middle. The cell wall is smooth or covered in granules, warts, or ridges. Cells have one chloroplast filling the cell, each with a single pyrenoid.

Species of Stauridium have thin cell walls, so they tend not to preserve well in sediments.

== Taxonomy ==
Although Stauridium was first described by August Carl Joseph Corda in 1839, for most of its history it was considered to be a synonym of Pediastrum. In 2005, molecular phylogenetic analyses showed that Pediastrum sensu lato was paraphyletic with respect to Hydrodictyon. Therefore, Pediastrum was split up into several genera, including Stauridium.
