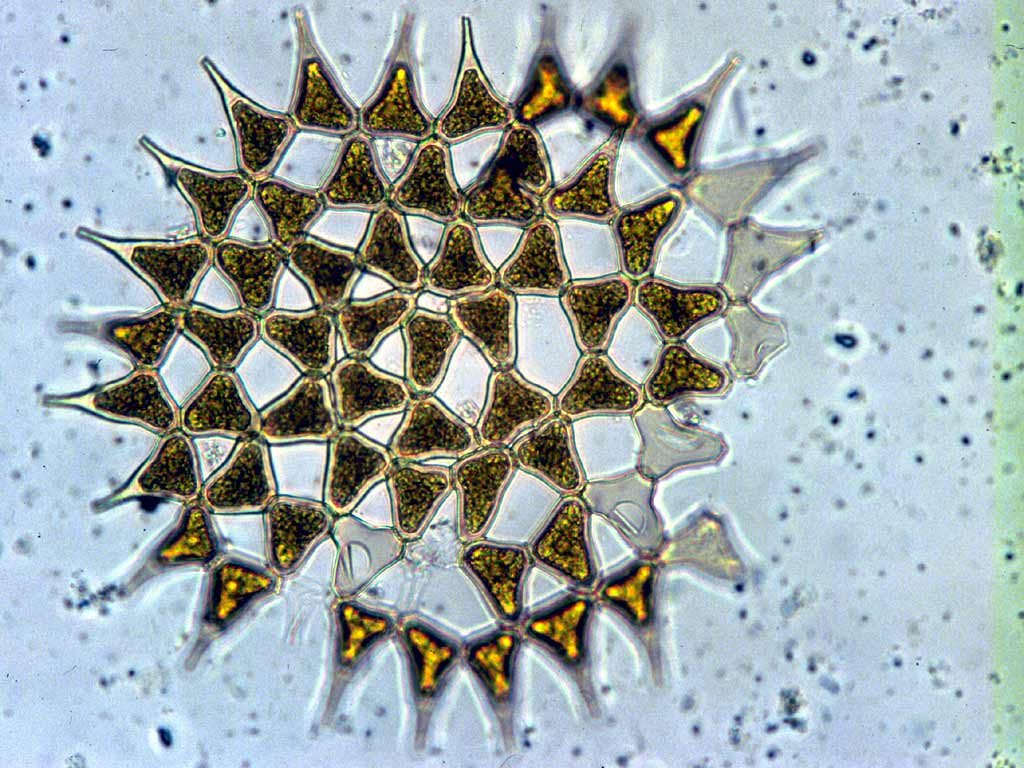
- Monactinus simplex

Scientific classification
- Kingdom: Plantae
- Division: Chlorophyta
- Class: Chlorophyceae
- Order: Sphaeropleales
- Family: Hydrodictyaceae
- Genus: Monactinus; Corda, 1839

Type species
- Monactinus simplex (Meyen) Corda

Species
- Monactinus asymmetricus; Monactinus simplex

= Monactinus =

Genus of algae

Monactinus is a genus of green algae in the family Hydrodictyaceae. It is very common in freshwater regions throughout the world.

== Description ==
Monactinus forms flat colonies, termed coenobia, of cells in powers of two, usually four, eight, or 16. Coenobia are disc-shaped in outline, and marginal cells are drawn out into one lobe or point. This distinguishes it from Pediastrum and closely related genera, which have marginal cells which are drawn out into two lobes or points. Monactinus shows a considerable amount of morphological diversity, with cells displaying different shapes, cell wall surface granulations, and inter-cellular gaps (or lack thereof). Cells have one chloroplast filling the cell, each with a single pyrenoid.

== Taxonomy ==
Although Monactinus was first described by August Carl Joseph Corda in 1839, for most of its history it was considered to be a synonym of Pediastrum. In 2005, molecular phylogenetic analyses showed that Pediastrum sensu lato was paraphyletic with respect to Hydrodictyon. Therefore, Pediastrum was split up into several genera, including Monactinus.
