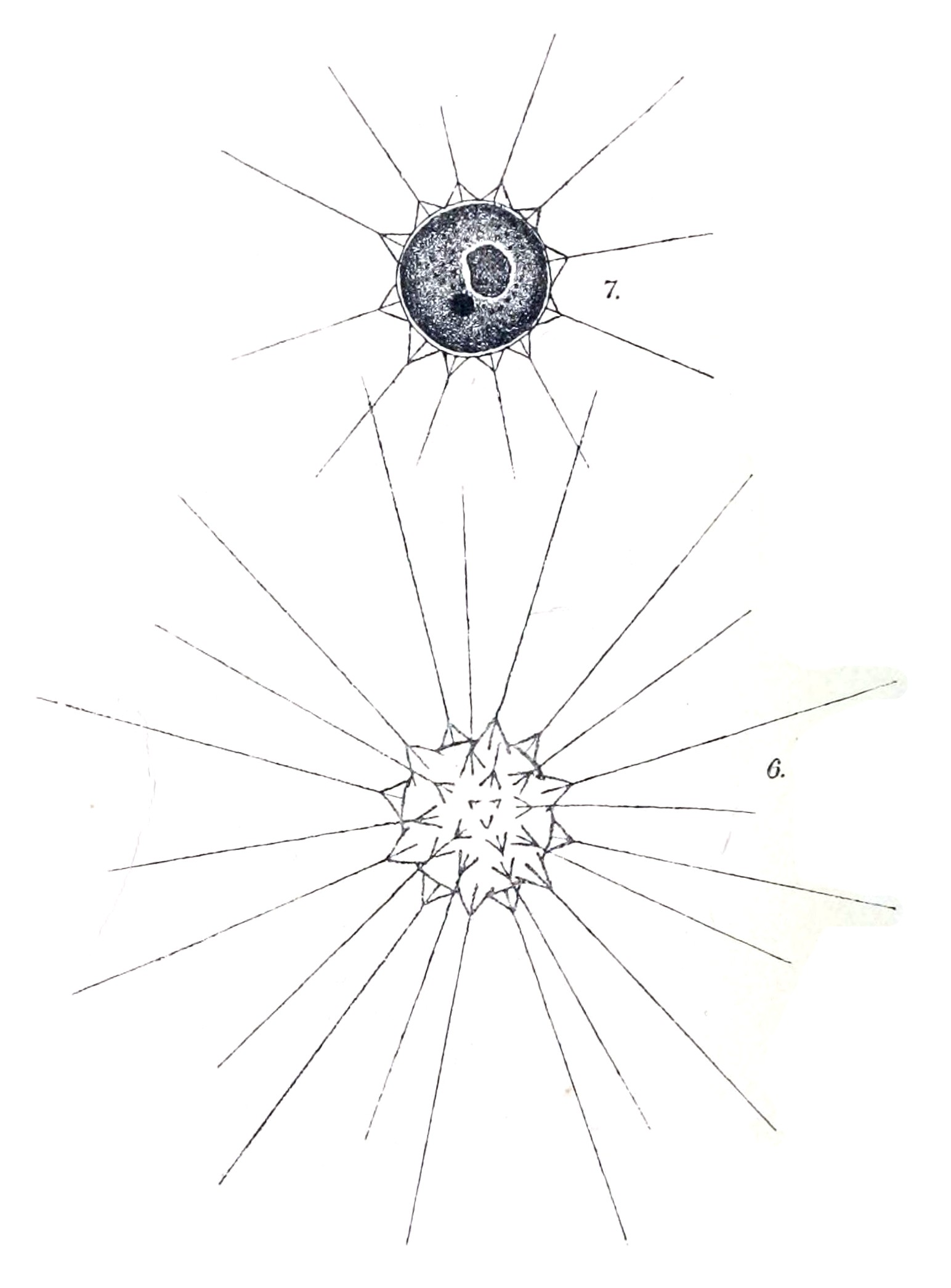

Scientific classification
- Kingdom: Plantae
- Division: Chlorophyta
- Class: Chlorophyceae
- Order: Sphaeropleales
- Family: Neochloridaceae
- Genus: Echinosphaeridium; Lemmermann

Type species
- Echinosphaeridium nordstedtii Lemmermann

Species
- Echinosphaeridium hexacantha; Echinosphaeridium nordstedtii; Echinosphaeridium pulchrum; Echinosphaeridium quadrisetum

= Echinosphaeridium =

Genus of algae

Echinosphaeridium is a genus of green algae in the family Neochloridaceae. It is found in freshwater habitats, but it is very rare. It has only been recorded a few times since its original discovery in Sweden.

== Description ==
Echinosphaeridium consists of solitary, spherical cells surrounded by thin spines. The spines are surrounded by a triangular structure at the base, which consist of three "wings" similar in form to the fletchings on arrows. Unlike the related genus Golenkinia, cells are not surrounded by a layer of mucilage. One chloroplast is present per cell, containing a pyrenoid.

Echinosphaeridium is similar to the genus Golenkinia, and several authors have considered it to be an anomalous form of the latter. However, Echinosphaeridium is distinguished by the structure of the spines (particularly at their bases), and the lack of mucilage surrounding the cells. Occasionally, the mucilage layer in Golenkinia may be draped around the spines, giving it a superficially similar appearance.
