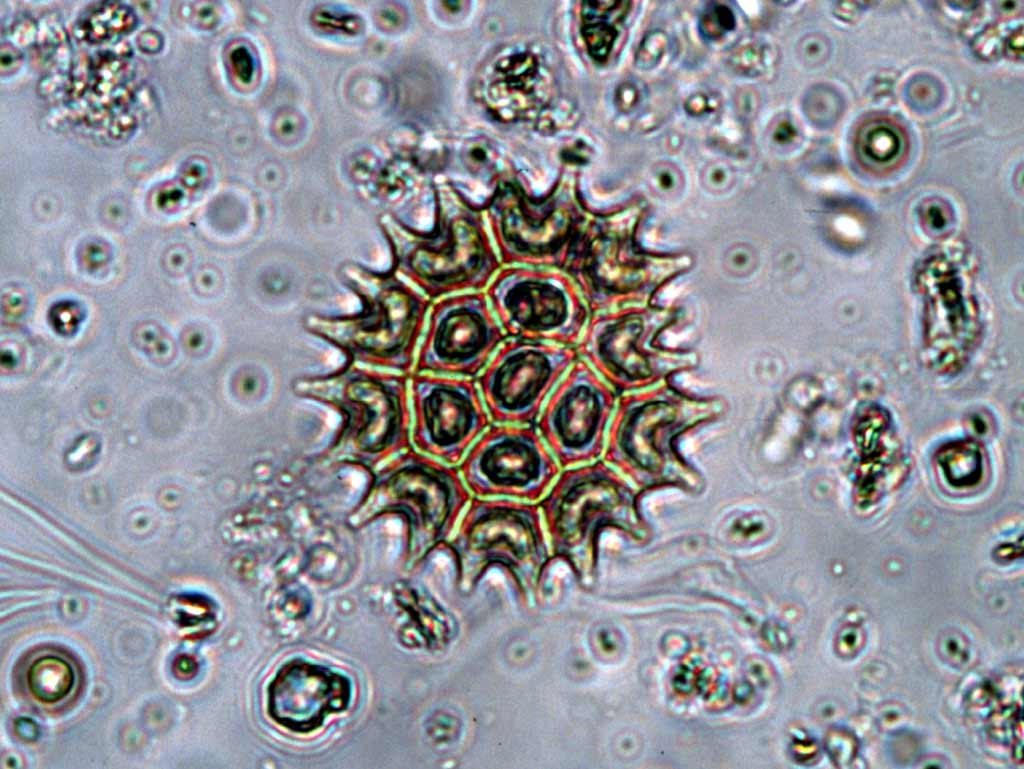
- Pseudopediastrum boryanum

Scientific classification
- Kingdom: Plantae
- Division: Chlorophyta
- Class: Chlorophyceae
- Order: Sphaeropleales
- Family: Hydrodictyaceae
- Genus: Pseudopediastrum; E.Hegewald, 2005

Type species
- Pseudopediastrum boryanum (Turp.) E.Hegewald

Species
- Pseudopediastrum boryanum; Pseudopediastrum kawraiskyi

= Pseudopediastrum =

Genus of algae

Pseudopediastrum is a genus of green algae in the family Hydrodictyaceae. It is very common in freshwater regions throughout the world.

== Description ==
Pseudopediastrum forms flat colonies, termed coenobia, of cells in powers of two, usually four, eight, 16, or 32. Coenobia are disc-shaped in outline, and marginal cells are drawn out into two lobes or points. Cells have one chloroplast filling the cell, each with a single pyrenoid. In most species, the cells are contiguous without gaps between them, but this is not always the case. Important identifying characteristics include cell shape and cell wall granulation.

== Taxonomy ==
In 2005, molecular phylogenetic analyses showed that Pediastrum sensu lato was paraphyletic with respect to Hydrodictyon. Therefore, Pediastrum was split up into several genera, including Pseudopediastrum. However, the genus Pseudopediastrum is still not monophyletic, in particular the morphologically diverse species Pseudopediastrum boryanum. Therefore, the genus is still in need of a revision.
