= Bracteacoccus helveticus =

Scientific classification
- Clade: Viridiplantae
- Division: Chlorophyta
- Class: Chlorophyceae
- Order: Sphaeropleales
- Family: Bracteacoccaceae
- Genus: Bracteacoccus
- Species: B. helveticus

Binomial name
- Bracteacoccus helveticus (Kol & F.Chodat) Starr

Synonyms
- Cryococcus helveticus Kol & F.Chodat

Species of algae

Bracteacoccus helveticus is a species of green algae, in the family Bracteacoccaceae. Under its synonym Cryococcus helveticus, it was the only species in the genus Cryococcus.
