= Tetrapedia =

Tetrapedia may refer to:

- Tetrapedia (alga), a genus of algae in the family Hydrodictyaceae
- Tetrapedia (bee), a genus of bees in the family Apidae
