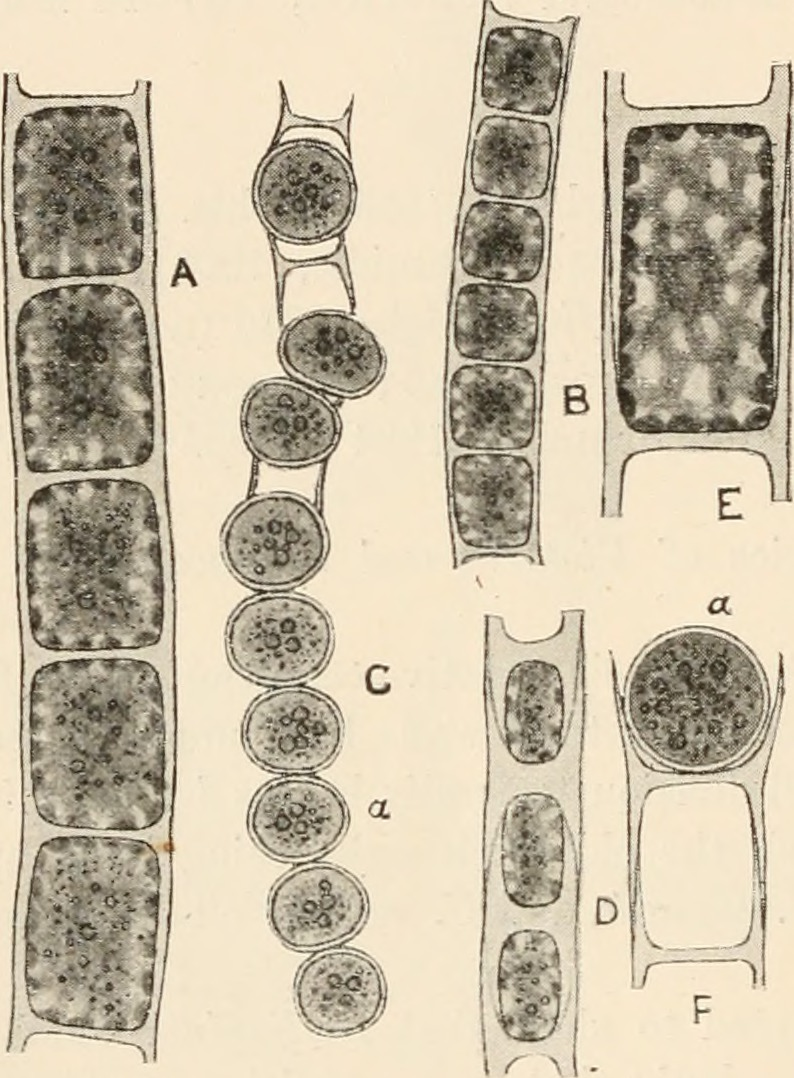
- A, Microspora amœna (Kütz.) Lagerh. B and C, ? M. abbreviata (Rabenh.) Lagerh.; B, vegetative filament; C, filament with aplanospores (a). D, M. pachyderma (Wille) Lagerh. E, single vegetative cell of M. amœna var. crassior Hansg., showing the reticulated chloroplast. The indistinct blur in the centre of the cell indicates the position of the nucleus. F, fragment of filament of M. amœna with aplanospore (a).

Scientific classification
- Kingdom: Plantae
- Division: Chlorophyta
- Class: Chlorophyceae
- Order: Sphaeropleales
- Family: Microsporaceae
- Genus: Microspora; Thuret, 1850

Type species
- Microspora floccosa (Vaucher) Thuret

Species
- Microspora stagnorum; Microspora sp. UTEX LB 472

= Microspora =

Genus of green algae

Microspora is a genus of green algae in the family Microsporaceae. Microspora was first named by Gustave Thuret in 1850. The name was used by Arthur Hill Hassall earlier in 1843, for another genus, but Thuret's genus has been conserved over Hassall's.

Microspora is a freshwater alga, found in still or flowing water. It is most common in the colder months of the year. One species, Microspora ficulinae, is an endosymbiont within marine sponges. It has a cosmopolitan distribution.

== Description ==
Microspora consists of uniseriate, unbranched filaments. Cells are cylindrical, quadrate or slightly swollen. The cell wall consists of two overlapping, "H-shaped" halves, often visible at the end of filaments where cells have broken off. The cell contains a single, parietal chloroplast which is perforated to form a fine or coarse net; the chloroplast has no pyrenoids.

Reproduction occurs asexually and sexually, via biflagellate zoospores or isogametes. Aplanospores and akinetes have also been observed.

Species of Microspora have traditionally been distinguished based on vegetative characters, such as the width of the filaments. However, these characters are known to be unreliable.

== Taxonomy ==
In phylogenetic analyses, Microspora forms a clade with Flintia (formerly Paralella), but the exact placement within Chlorophyceae is somewhat equivocal. No type material exists for Microspora.
