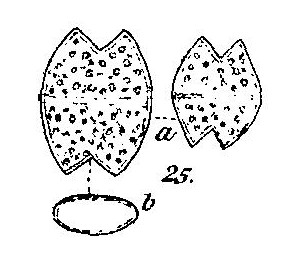
- Euastropsis richteri diagram

Scientific classification
- Clade: Viridiplantae
- Division: Chlorophyta
- Class: Chlorophyceae
- Order: Sphaeropleales
- Family: Hydrodictyaceae
- Genus: Euastropsis; Lagerheim
- Species: E. richteri

Binomial name
- Euastropsis richteri (Schmidle) Lagerheim, 1894

= Euastropsis =

Genus of algae

Euastropsis is a genus of algae belonging to the family Hydrodictyaceae, containing the single species Euastropsis richteri.
