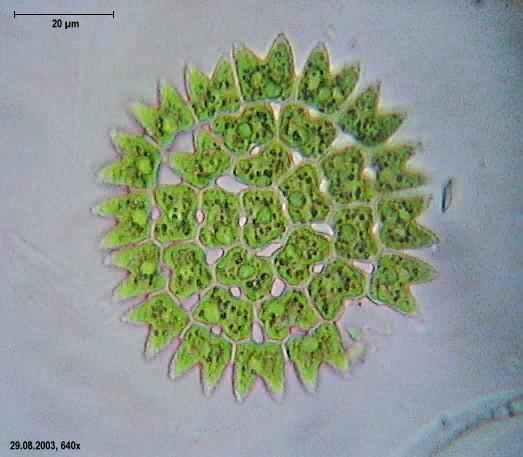
- Pediastrum duplex

Scientific classification
- Clade: Viridiplantae
- Division: Chlorophyta
- Class: Chlorophyceae
- Order: Sphaeropleales
- Family: Hydrodictyaceae
- Genus: Pediastrum
- Species: P. duplex

Binomial name
- Pediastrum duplex Meyen 1829

Synonyms
- Pediastrum napoleonis Ralfs; Pediastrum pertusum Kützing, 1845; Pediastrum selenaea Kützing, 1845

= Pediastrum duplex =

Species of alga

Pediastrum duplex is a species of fresh water green algae in the genus Pediastrum. It is the type species of the genus Pediastrum.

Pediastrum duplex forms nonmotile coenobia (colonies) with a fixed number of cells. These coenobia are flat and have a circular shape. The colonies usually contain 8 to 32 cells, with examples of 4, 64 or 128 occurring rarely. Colonies have holes between the cells; the holes are smaller in diameter than the cells. The cells are polygonal, distinctly rectangular in outline with concave sides. The outer cells of the coenobium have two triangular lobes that are longer than the cell body. At the tip of the lobes are very short rosettes that may also have fine bristles. The cell wall is usually smooth, but may sometimes have a distinct sculptured texture. It reproduces by forming autocolonies asexually, although sexual reproduction has also been observed.

Pediastrum duplex is a very common component of the freshwater phytoplankton, and has a cosmopolitan distribution. Because the cell wall is resistant to decay, the cell wall has been found in Holocene lake sediments.

== Infraspecies ==
Because Pediastrum duplex is very variable, many infraspecific taxa have been named. A partial list is included below:

Pediastrum duplex brachylobum
Pediastrum duplex clathratum
Pediastrum duplex cohaerens
Pediastrum duplex duplex
Pediastrum duplex f. denticulatum Isabella & R.J. Patel
Pediastrum duplex gracillimum
Pediastrum duplex regulosum
Pediastrum duplex reticulatum
Pediastrum duplex rotundatum
Pediastrum duplex var. asperum
Pediastrum duplex var. clathratum (A.Braun) Lagerheim, 1882
Pediastrum duplex var. convexum W. Krieger
Pediastrum duplex var. cornutum
Pediastrum duplex var. gracillimum W. West & G.S. West
Pediastrum duplex var. irregulare G.R. Hegde & K. Somanna
Pediastrum duplex var. longicorne W. Krieger
Pediastrum duplex var. reticulatum Lagerheim, 1882
Pediastrum duplex var. rugulosum Raciborski
Pediastrum duplex var. subgranulatum Raciborski

One variety, Pediastrum duplex var. gracillimum, has been shown to be not closely related to Pediastrum duplex sensu stricto. It differs by having cells with narrower lobes and comparatively larger gaps between cells in the colonies. This variety has been split off as a new genus, named Lacunastrum with Lacunastrum gracillimum as its sole species.
