= Schroederia =

Schroederia may refer to:

- Schroederia (alga), a genus of algae,
- Schroederia (bug), a genus of bugs in the tribe Mictini.
- Data related to Schroederia at Wikispecies
