= Poloidion =

Scientific classification
- Clade: Viridiplantae
- Division: Chlorophyta
- Class: Chlorophyceae
- Order: Sphaeropleales
- Family: Neochloridaceae
- Genus: Poloidion; Pascher, 1944
- Species: P. didymos

Binomial name
- Poloidion didymos Pascher, 1944

Genus of algae

Poloidion is a genus of green algae in the family Neochloridaceae, containing the single species Poloidion didymos. It is an extremely rare genus, which has only been recorded once on moist soil and rocks in Austria.

Poloidion consists of cells in groups of two, sometimes four or solitary. The cell wall is noticeably thickened on one side. Cells are ovoid, ellipsoidal or irregularly spherical. The chloroplast is cup-shaped, lacking a pyrenoid. Poloidion reproduces mainly by producing two autospores; it may also produce zoospores with two flagella.
