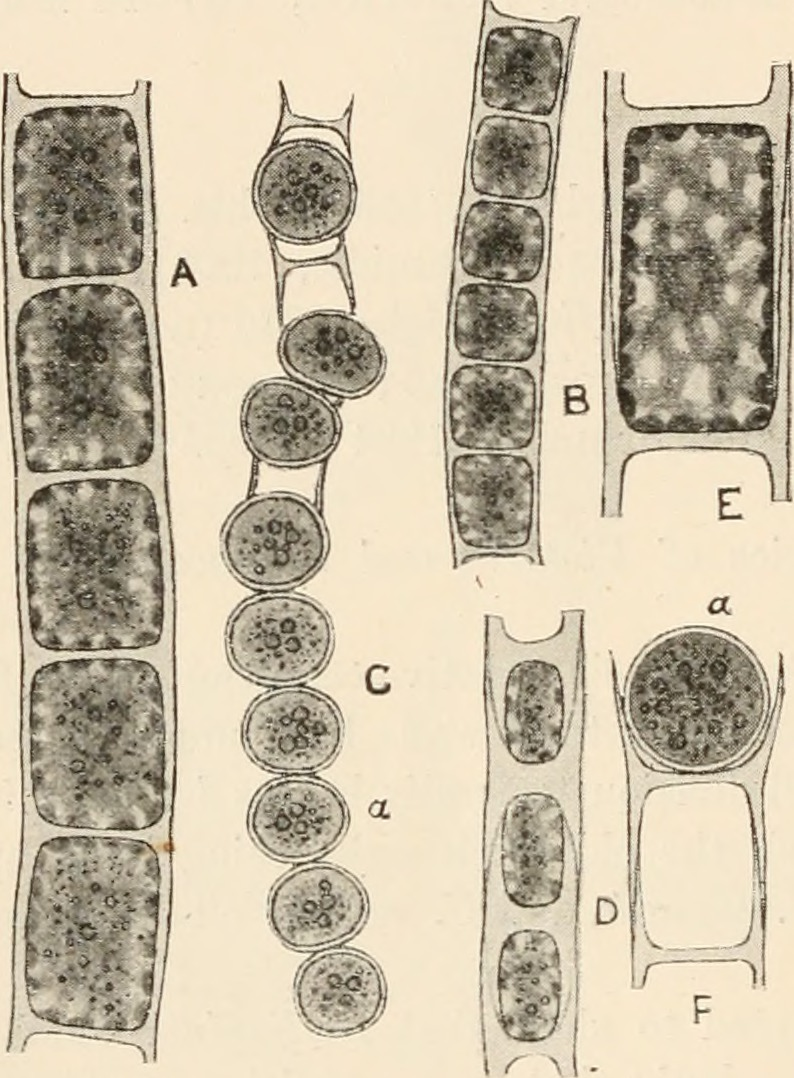
- A, Microspora amœna (Kütz.) Lagerh. B and C, ? M. abbreviata (Rabenh.) Lagerh.; B, vegetative filament; C, filament with aplanospores (a). D, M. pachyderma (Wille) Lagerh. E, single vegetative cell of M. amœna var. crassior Hansg., showing the reticulated chloroplast. The indistinct blur in the centre of the cell indicates the position of the nucleus. F, fragment of filament of M. amœna with aplanospore (a).

Scientific classification
- Kingdom: Plantae
- Division: Chlorophyta
- Class: Chlorophyceae
- Order: Sphaeropleales
- Family: Microsporaceae; Bohlin

Genera
- Flintia; Microspora

= Microsporaceae =

Family of algae

Microsporaceae are a family of green algae in the class Chlorophyceae.

The family Microsporaceae consists of two genera, Microspora and Flintia, which form a clade according to molecular data. Microspora is a filamentous genus, while Flintia is a coccoid organism.
