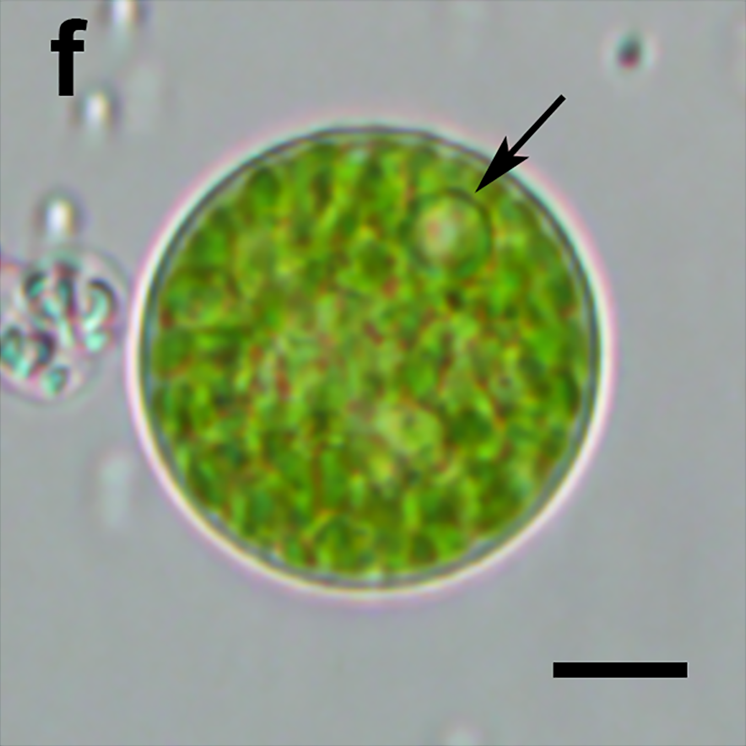
- Neochloris aquatica

Scientific classification
- Kingdom: Plantae
- Division: Chlorophyta
- Class: Chlorophyceae
- Order: Sphaeropleales
- Family: Neochloridaceae
- Genus: Neochloris; R.C.Starr, 1955

Type species
- Neochloris aquatica R.C.Starr

Species
- N. aquatica; N. conjuncta; N. dissecta; N. gelatinosa; N. pseudostigmata; N. pseudostigmatica; N. pyrenoidosa; N. vigensis; N. wimmeri

= Neochloris =

Genus of algae

Neochloris is a genus of green algae in the family Neochloridaceae. It is found in freshwater aquatic and terrestrial soil habitats.

== Description ==
Neochloris consists of spherical cells that are solitary or sometimes found in small clusters. The cell wall is thin and smooth. Cells are multinucleate (with multiple nuclei). Each cell has a single parietal chloroplast with one to several pyrenoids.

Neochloris reproduces asexually. Reproduction occurs via aplanospores or zoospores. Zoospores bear two flagella; upon spore germination, the zoospore loses its flagella and becomes spherical.

== Taxonomy ==
Neochloris was first described by Richard C. Starr in 1955 with a single species Neochloris aquatica, with more species being added by later authors. However, the genus in this circumscription was polyphyletic. Species once placed in Neochloris have now been placed in two segregate genera, Ettlia and Parietochloris.

Ettlia and Parietochloris differ from Neochloris in being uninucleate while Neochloris sensu stricto contains multinucleate cells. Additional features of the flagellar apparatus are visible in ultrastructure as well. The basal bodies of the zoospore flagella in Neochloris are arranged directly opposite to each other, those of Ettlia are arranged in a clockwise orientation, and those of Parietochloris are arranged in a counterclockwise orientation.

== Ecology ==
The species Neochloris aquatica may have potential as a biological control agent against mosquitoes, specifically Culex quinquefasciatus.
