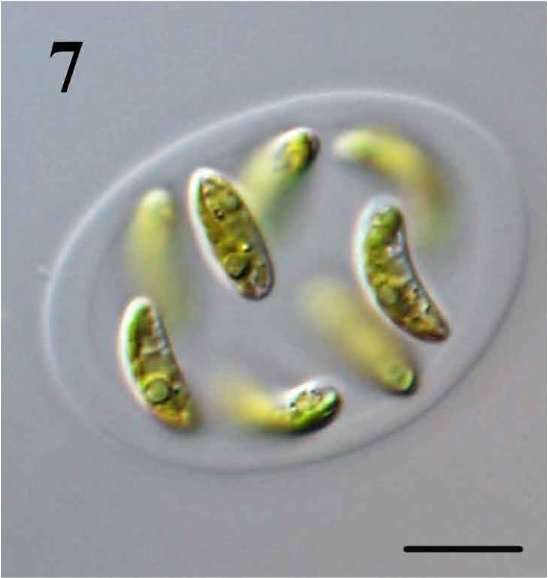
- Nephrocytium agardhianum

Scientific classification
- Clade: Viridiplantae
- Division: Chlorophyta
- Class: Chlorophyceae
- Order: Sphaeropleales
- Family: Nephrocytiaceae; T.S.Garcia, Bagatini & Štenclová
- Genus: Nephrocytium; Nägeli, 1849

Type species
- Nephrocytium agardhianum Nägeli, 1849

Species
- Nephrocytium agardhianum; Nephrocytium limneticum; Nephrocytium lunaris; Nephrocytium lunatum

= Nephrocytium =

Genus of algae

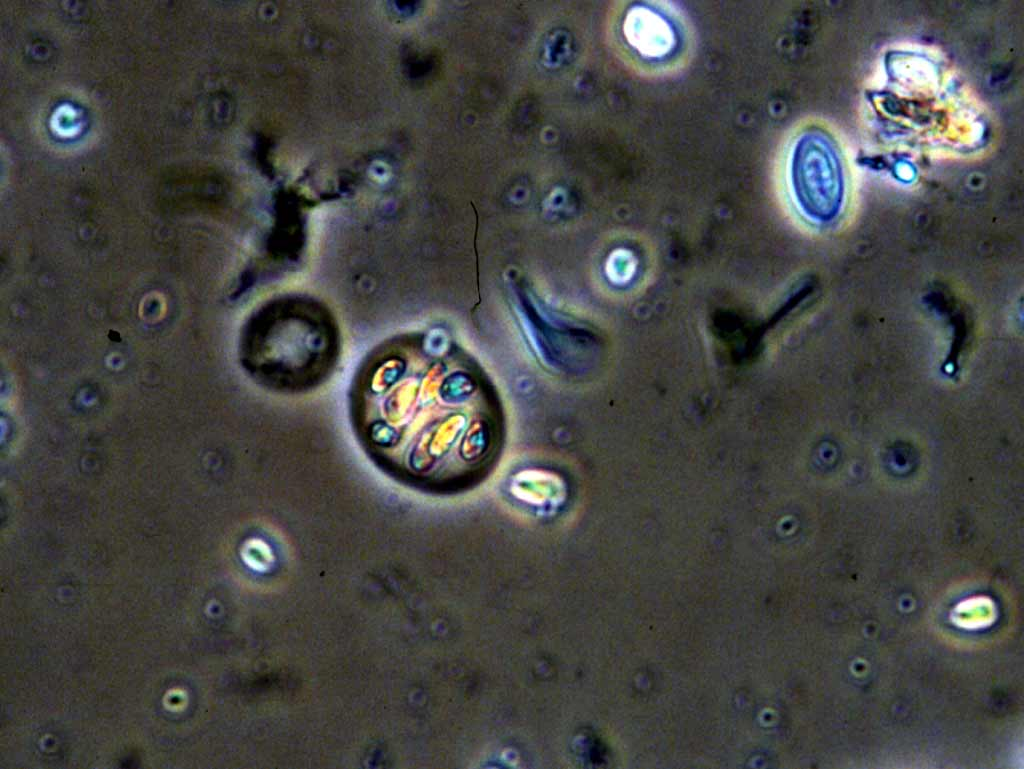

Nephrocytium is a genus of green algae in the class Chlorophyceae. Formerly placed in the family Oocystaceae, it is currently placed in its own family, Nephrocytiaceae.

The name Nephrocytium is derived from the Ancient Greek νεφρός (nephrós, "kidney") and κύτος (kytos, "vessel").

== Description ==
Nephrocytium consists of colonies of 4, 8, or 16 asymmetrical cells surrounded by a spherical to ovoid layer of mucilage, which is formed when the mother cell wall expands and gelatinizes. Individual cells are kidney-shaped to ovoid, containing one chloroplast lining the inside of the cell membrane, each with one pyrenoid.

Reproduction occurs asexually. It exclusively forms autospores, and does not appear to have a flagellated stage in its life cycle.

=== Identification ===
Similar genera include Nephrochlamys and Juranyiella; Nephrochlamys differs in having cells that lack pyrenoids, while Juranyiella has granules dotted on the cell wall surface.

Species are distinguished mainly by the shape of the cells (particularly at their apices), cell sizes, and length-to-width ratios. However, cells enlarge during their life cycle, which must be taken into account while identifying Nephrocytium species.
