= Bracteamorpha =

Scientific classification
- Clade: Viridiplantae
- Division: Chlorophyta
- Class: Chlorophyceae
- Order: Sphaeropleales
- Family: Bracteamorphaceae
- Genus: Bracteamorpha; Fuciková, P.O.Lewis & L.A.Lewis, 2014
- Species: B. trainorii

Binomial name
- Bracteamorpha trainorii Fuciková, P.O.Lewis & L.A.Lewis, 2014

Family of algae

Bracteamorpha is a genus of green algae in the order Sphaeropleales, and is the only genus in the family Bracteamorphaceae. It contains a single species, Bracteamorpha trainorii.

Bracteamorpha is a terrestrial alga that inhabits soils. It was first discovered in a biological soil crust from a desert in New Mexico, USA.

== Description ==
Bracteamorpha trainorii consists of solitary cells that are roughly spherical to ovoid, up to 24 μm long. When young, the cells have a single parietal lobed chloroplast; at maturity, cells have many small chloroplasts, both lining the outer wall (i.e. parietal) and deeper within the cell. Chloroplasts lack sheathed pyrenoids. Mature cells are multinucleate; that is, they have multiple nuclei. Old cells may be orange in color due to the presence of carotenoid pigments.

Bracteamorpha reproduces asexually and sexually. Asexual reproduction occurs by the formation of autospores, or zoospores. In autospore formation, 4 to 16 daughter cells are produced per mother cell. Zoospores have two flagella of slightly unequal length and an inconspicuous stigma. In sexual reproduction, the gametes are isogamous and are similar in morphology to the zoospores.
