= Tetrapedia (alga) =

Scientific classification
- Kingdom: Plantae
- Division: Chlorophyta
- Class: Chlorophyceae
- Order: Sphaeropleales
- Family: Hydrodictyaceae
- Genus: Tetrapedia; Reinsch, 1866

Species
- Tetrapedia gothica; Tetrapedia reinschiana

Genus of algae

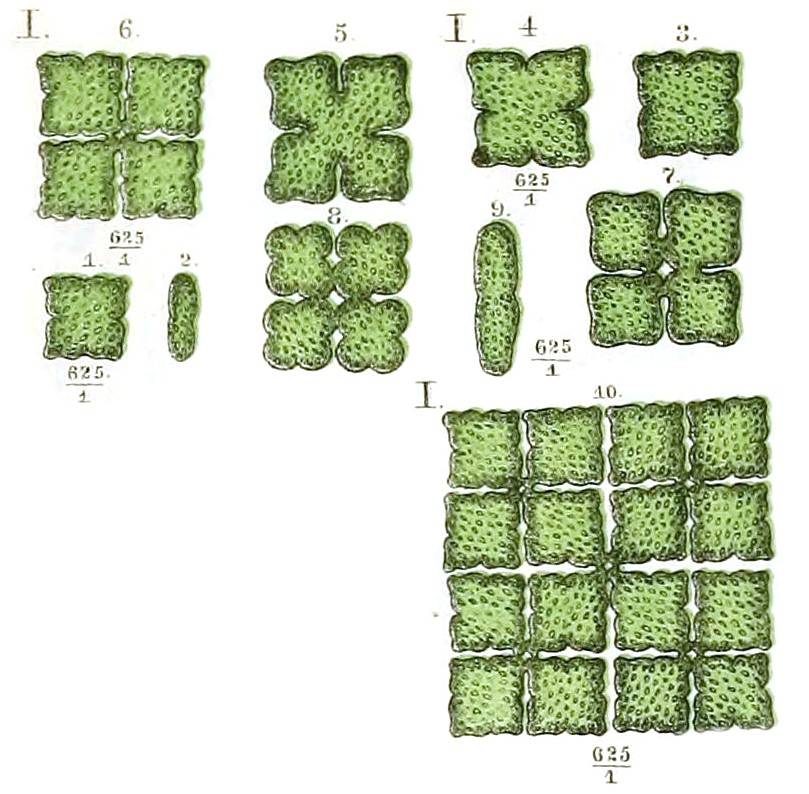
Tetrapedia gothica

Tetrapedia is a genus of green algae in the family Hydrodictyaceae.
