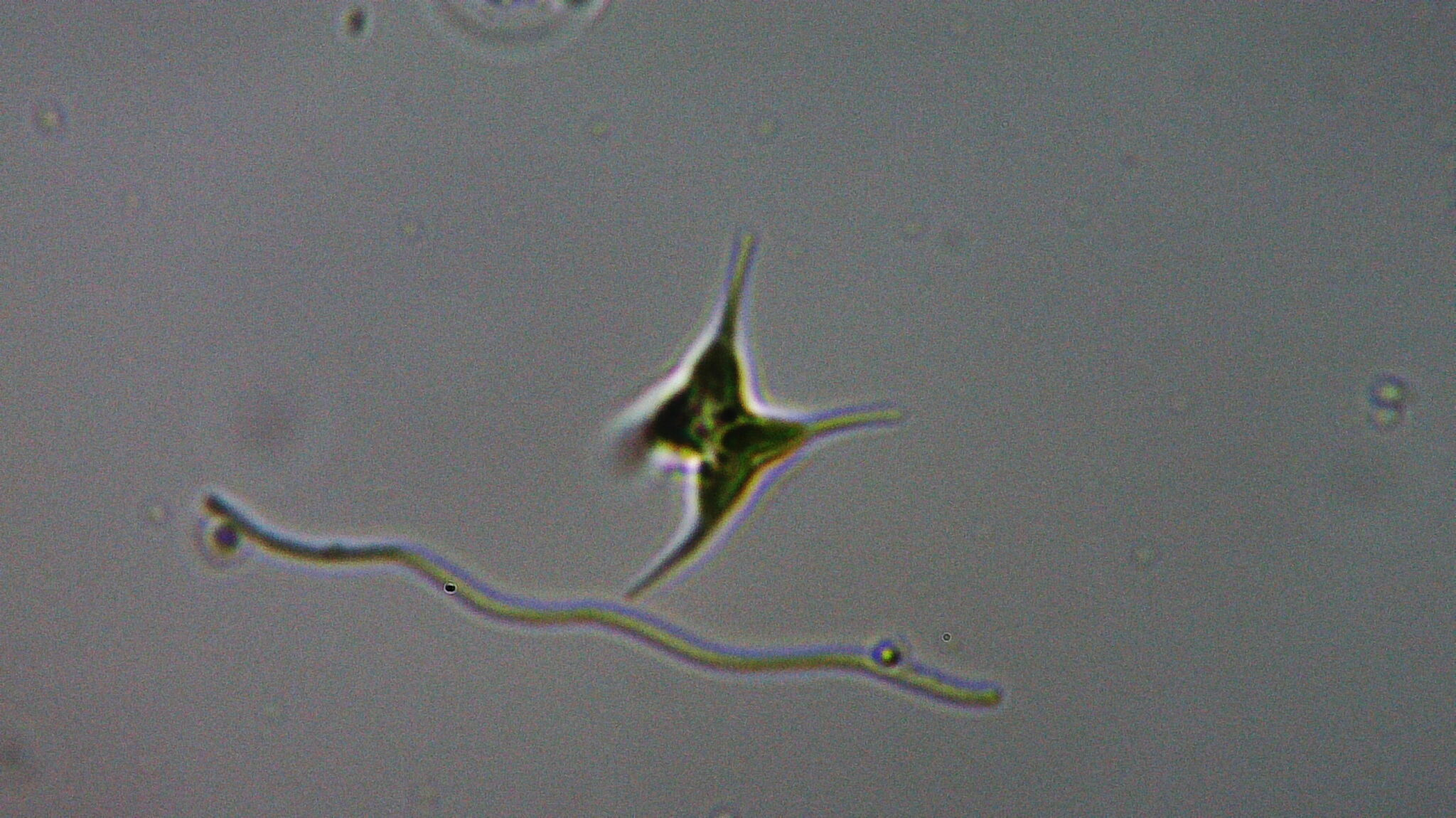
- Chlorotetraedron incus

Scientific classification
- Clade: Viridiplantae
- Division: Chlorophyta
- Class: Chlorophyceae
- Order: Sphaeropleales
- Family: Neochloridaceae
- Genus: Chlorotetraedron; F.J.MacEntee, H.C.Bold & P.A.Archibald, 1978

Type species
- Chlorotetraedron polymorphum F.J.MacEntee, H.C.Bold & P.A.Archibald

Species
- Chlorotetraedron bitridens; Chlorotetraedron incus; Chlorotetraedron polymorphum

= Chlorotetraedron =

Genus of algae

Chlorotetraedron is a genus of green algae, in the family Neochloridaceae. The name may also be written as Chlorotetraëdron. It is found as freshwater plankton or in soil.

The genus was first described under the name of Pseudotetraedron by Frank J. MacEntee in 1977; however, that name was taken by a genus of algae in the Xanthophyceae (the yellow-green algae). Therefore, the genus was renamed to Chlorotetraedron. Currently, three species are known.

== Description ==
Chlorotetraedron consists of cells up that are solitary or rarely found in irregular groups. They are microscopic, up to 100 μm in diameter, with a smooth cell wall. Cells are generally angular in shape, varying from tetrahedral to polyhedral. In cultivation, the cells may become nearly spherical, but the remnants of the angles are present as papillae. Cells contain one nucleus when young, later having multiple nuclei, and a single parietal chloroplast. Chloroplasts contain one or several pyrenoids.

Chlorotetraedron reproduces asexually by zoospores or aplanospores. Zoospores are naked and have two flagella. They eventually become spherical and tetrahedral upon germination.

The shape of the cells are similar to Tetraedron. However, Tetraedron has uninucleate cells (i.e. with a single nucleus at maturity), only produces autospores and not zoospores, and has a rough outer sporopollenin layer.
