= Pseudomuriella =

Scientific classification
- Clade: Viridiplantae
- Division: Chlorophyta
- Class: Chlorophyceae
- Order: Sphaeropleales
- Family: Pseudomuriellaceae; Fučíková, P.O.Lewis & L.A.Lewis
- Genus: Pseudomuriella; N.Hanagata, 1998

Type species
- Pseudomuriella aurantiaca (W.Vischer) N.Hanagata

Species
- P. aurantiaca (W.Vischer) N.Hanagata, 1998; P. cubensis K.Fuciková, J.C.Rada, A.Lukesová & L.A.Lewis, 2011; P. engadinensis (Kol & Chodat) Fuciková, Rada & L.A.Lewis, 2011; P. schumacherensis Fuciková, Rada & L.A.Lewis, 2011; P. sp. Itas 9/21 14-1d

Genus of algae

Pseudomuriella is a genus of green algae in the class Chlorophyceae. It is the sole genus of the family Pseudomuriellaceae. It is a terrestrial alga that inhabits soils.

== Description ==
Pseudomuriella consists of solitary, spheroidal cells surrounded by a smooth cell wall. Young cells have a single nucleus, but mature cells have nuclei (i.e. are multinucleate). Each cell has multiple chloroplasts lining the outside of the cell; each chloroplast is saucer-shaped when young and divided into multiple segments when older. Chloroplasts lack pyrenoids. Cells may have secondary carotenoids present, giving the cells an orange color especially when old. Pseudomuriella reproduces asexually, mainly by autospores, but sometimes by aplanospores or biflagellated zoospores as well.

Morphologically, the genus is essentially indistinguishable from Bracteacoccus and Chromochloris, although Pseudomuriella seems to reproduce mostly by autospores. Molecular data is necessary for a reliable identification.
