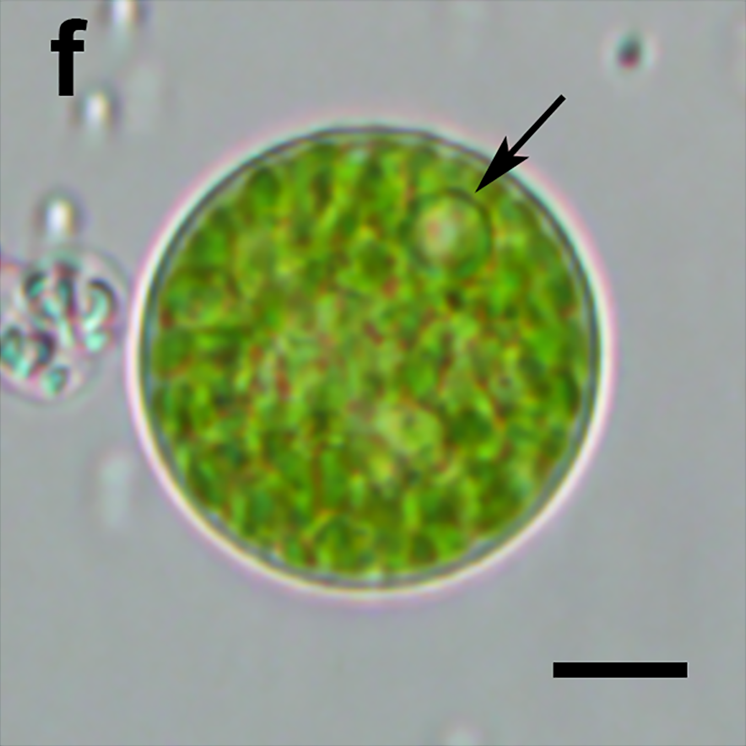
- Neochloris aquatica

Scientific classification
- Kingdom: Plantae
- Division: Chlorophyta
- Class: Chlorophyceae
- Order: Sphaeropleales
- Family: Neochloridaceae; Ettl & Komárek

Genera
- Botryosphaerella; Chlorotetraedron; Echinosphaeridium; Neochloris; Poloidion

= Neochloridaceae =

Family of algae

Neochloridaceae is a family of green algae in the order Sphaeropleales.

Neochloridaceae consists of aquatic, coccoid algae. The cells are spherical or with complex polyhedral shapes. Chloroplasts have pyrenoids that are surrounded by continuous starch sheaths. They reproduce via asexual reproduction, where the cell forms aplanospores or zoospores; the zoospores bear two flagella.

Phylogenetically, Neochloridaceae is sister to the family Hydrodictyaceae, a family which contains common and well-known algae such as Pediastrum.
