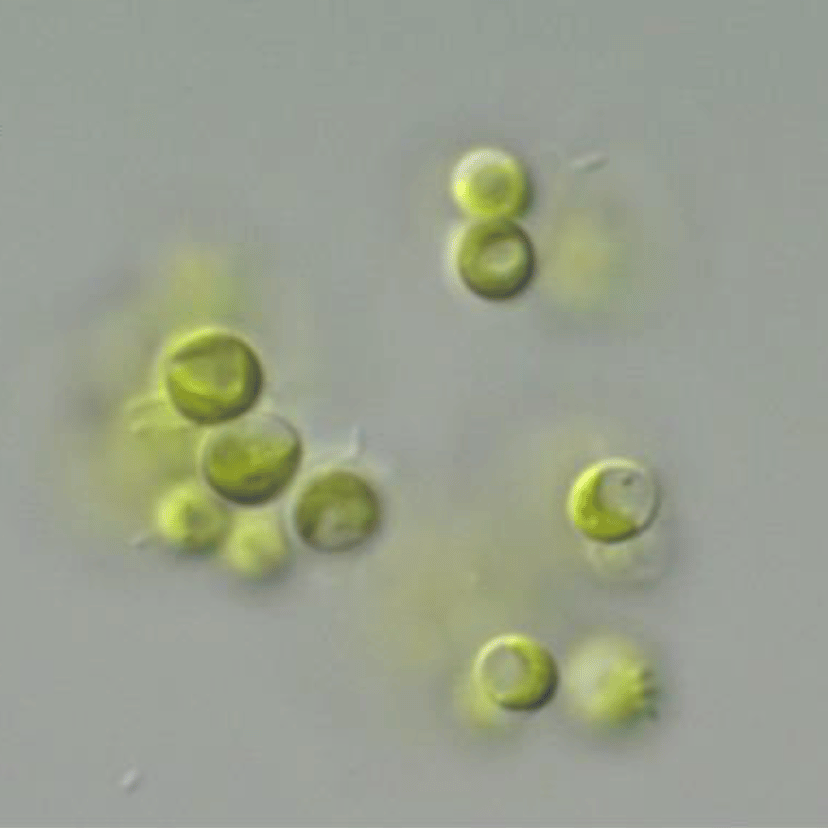
- Mychonastes hindakii

Scientific classification
- Clade: Viridiplantae
- Division: Chlorophyta
- Class: Chlorophyceae
- Order: Sphaeropleales
- Family: Mychonastaceae
- Genus: Mychonastes; P.D.Simpson & S.D.Van Valkenburg, 1978

Type species
- Mychonastes ruminatus P.D.Simpson & S.D.Van Valkenburg, 1978

Species
- See text

Synonyms
- Pseudodictyosphaerium Hindák, 1978

= Mychonastes =

Genus of algae

Mychonastes is a genus of green algae, specifically of the Chlorophyceae. It is the sole genus of the family Mychonastaceae.

Species of Mychonastes are found in plankton of freshwater or brackish waters, or found in soil. It is a very common genus, and is often dominant.

== Description ==
Mychonastes consists of solitary cells of groups of a few cells (rarely more than four). Cells are spherical or slightly ovate, uninucleate (with one nucleus) and a single parietal chloroplast without any pyrenoids. The cell wall is covered in an irregular network of ridges, only visible in (scanning electron microscopy). Cells are sometimes connected together by irregular, mucilaginous strands. These mucilaginous strands are formed from the mother cell wall after autospore release.

Mychonastes reproduces asexually via autospores. Usually 2 or 4 (sometimes up to 64) are produced per cell. They are released through a tear in the cell wall.

Species are differentiated from each other by the shape of the cells and their attachment to the strands, cell size, strand morphology, and colony characteristics. However, some species are cryptic and can only be distinguished through DNA barcoding. Additionally, the genus itself is difficult to distinguish from other single small-celled genera such as Choricystis, Meyerella and Nannochloris; therefore, molecular data appear to be the only reliable way to identify species of Mychonastes.

== Taxonomy ==
In 2011, Krienitz et al. proposed that Pseudodictyosphaerium be combined with Mychonastes into a single genus; since the latter genus was published earlier in 1978, its name has priority, therefore making Pseudodictyosphaerium a synonym of Mychonastes. Pseudodictyosphaerium was differentiated from Mychonastes in having colonies of cells. However, most strains can form both single cells and colonies, prompting the merger of the two genera.

== Species ==
- M. afer Krienitz, C.Bock, Dadheech & Proschold, 2011
- M. anomalus (Korshikov) Krienitz, C.Bock, Dadheech & Proschold, 2011
- M. botrytella (Komárek & Perman) Krienitz, C.Bock, Dadheech & Proschold, 2011
- M. densus (Hindák) Krienitz, C.Bock, Dadheech & Proschold, 2011
- M. desiccatus S.W.Brown, 1988
- M. elegans (Bachmann) Krienitz, C.Bock, Dadheech & Proschold, 2011
- M. fluviatilis (Hindák) Krienitz, C.Bock, Dadheech & Proschold, 2011
- M. hindakii Martynenko, E.Gusev, D.Kapustin & M.Kulikovskiy 2022
- M. homosphaera (Skuja) Kalina & Puncochárová, 1987
- M. huancayensis Krienitz, C.Bock, Dadheech & Proschold, 2011
- M. jurisii (Hindák) Krienitz, C.Bock, Dadheech & Proschold, 2011
- M. lacunaris (Hindák) Krienitz, C.Bock, Dadheech & Proschold, 2011
- M. minusculus (Hindák) Krienitz, C.Bock, Dadheech & Proschold, 2011
- M. ovahimbae Krienitz, C.Bock, Dadheech & Proschold, 2011
- M. pushpae Krienitz, C.Bock, Dadheech & Proschold, 2011
- M. pusillus Krienitz, C.Bock, Dadheech & Proschold, 2011
- M. racemosus Krienitz, C.Bock, Dadheech & Proschold, 2011
- M. rotundus Krienitz, C.Bock, Dadheech & Proschold, 2011
- M. ruminatus P.D.Simpson & S.D.Van Valkenburg, 1978
- M. scoticus (Hindák) Krienitz, C.Bock, Dadheech & Proschold, 2011
- M. timauensis Krienitz, C.Bock, Dadheech & Proschold, 2011
- M. sp. 5C3
- M. sp. 2C1
- M. sp. 6A3
- M. sp. 5C5
- M. sp. AN 2/29-3
- M. sp. AS 7-9
- M. sp. JL 1/12-12
- M. sp. Tow 6/3 P-1w
- M. sp. YHL/S/PLANKTON10

== Genome ==
The whole genome of Mychonastes homosphaera has been sequenced. Among species in the order Sphaeropleales that have been sequenced, it has the most compact, with a nuclear genome of 24.23 kB. Harboring 6,649 protein-coding genes, the genome is heavily streamlined. Mychonastes appears to be adapted for rapidly changing freshwater environments such as varying light conditions, nutrient concentrations, and temperatures.
