= Golenkiniopsis =

Scientific classification
- Kingdom: Plantae
- Division: Chlorophyta
- Class: Trebouxiophyceae
- Order: Chlorellales
- Family: Chlorellaceae
- Genus: Golenkiniopsis; Korshikov, 1953

Species
- Golenkiniopsis chlorelloides; Golenkiniopsis longispina; Golenkiniopsis parvula; Golenkiniopsis solitaria

Genus of algae

Golenkiniopsis is a genus of green algae in the family Chlorellaceae. It is found in freshwater plankton worldwide, but is rare.

== Description ==
Golenkiniopsis consists of spherical to somewhat ovoid cells that are covered in spines. Cells are typically solitary, but rarely the spines may become tangled with each other and create a colony-like appearance. The spines are thickened at the base and taper towards the tip. Cells contain a single parietal, cup-shaped chloroplast with one spherical to ellipsoidal pyrenoid.

The genus is very similar to Golenkinia, and is taxonomically confused. The original author Korshikov separated the two genera on the basis that Golenkinia has mucilage surrounding the spines, an urceolate chloroplast and reniform pyrenoid, whereas Golenkiniopsis has no mucilage around the spines, a poculiform chloroplast and a non-reniform pyrenoid.
