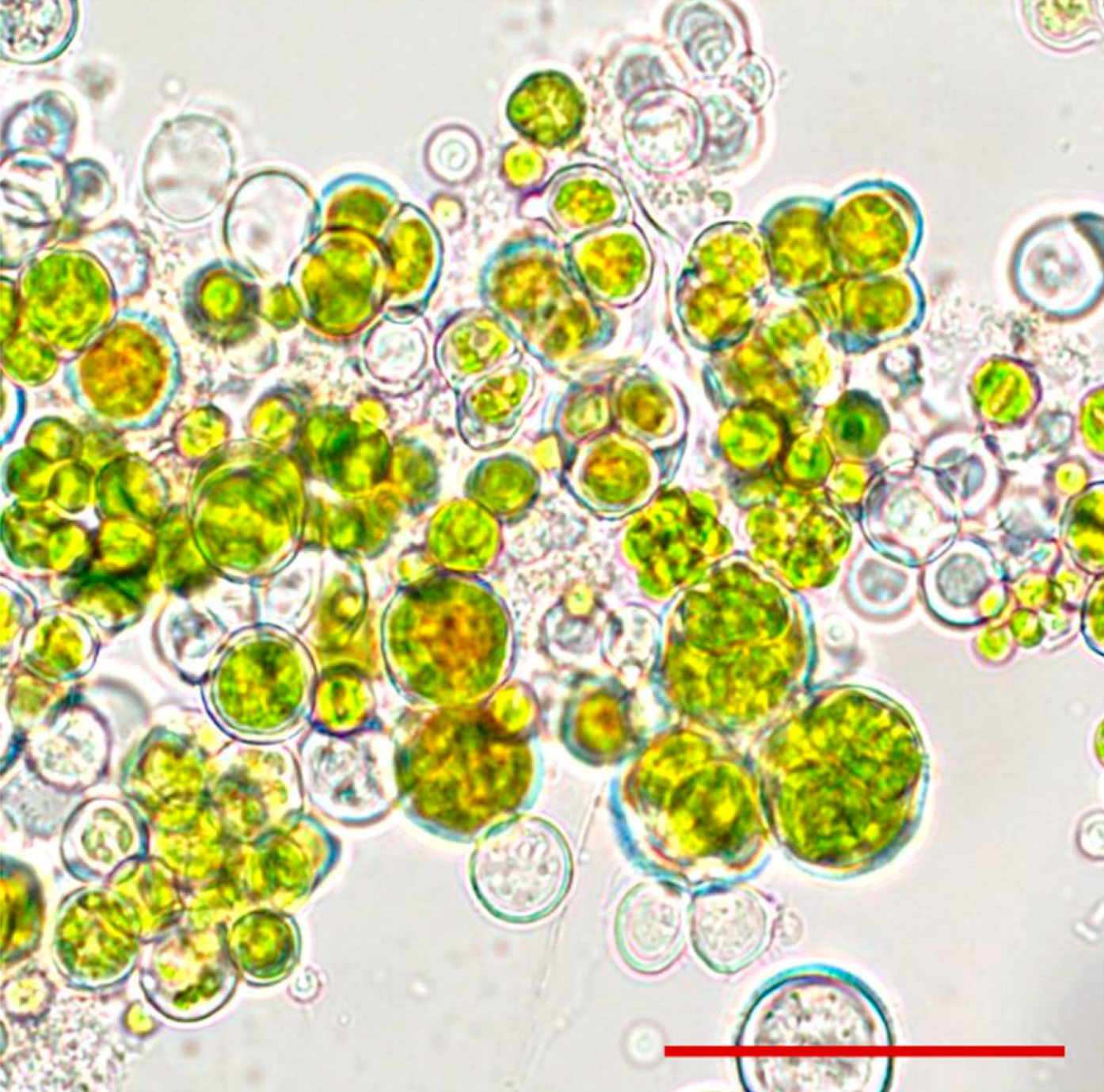
- Bracteacoccus aggregatus

Scientific classification
- Clade: Viridiplantae
- Division: Chlorophyta
- Class: Chlorophyceae
- Order: Sphaeropleales
- Family: Bracteacoccaceae; P.M.Tsarenko
- Genus: Bracteacoccus; Tereg, 1922

Type species
- Bracteacoccus aggregatus Tereg

Species
- See text

= Bracteacoccus =

Genus of algae

Bracteacoccus is a genus of green algae, the sole genus of the family Bracteacoccaceae. It is a terrestrial alga commonly found in soils, from the tropics to the poles.

== History ==
Bracteacoccus was described by E. Tereg in 1922, based on the species Bracteacoccus aggregatus. The name comes from the Latin term bractea, meaning a thin metal plate, and Greek kokkos, meaning berry. Later it was synonymized with the genus Dictyococcus, until Richard C. Starr reestablished the genus.

== Description ==
Bracteacoccus consists of solitary, typically spherical cells from 4 to 110 μm in diameter. Mature cells have multiple nuclei (i.e. are multinucleate). Each cell has multiple chloroplasts lining the outer wall of the cell; each chloroplast is angular in shape and lacks pyrenoids.

Bracteacoccus reproduces asexually by producing zoospores. The zoospores have two flagella which are slightly unequal in length. Bracteacoccus may also reproduce by producing non-motile aplanospores.

Morphologically, the genus is essentially indistinguishable from Pseudomuriella and Chromochloris, except for the fact that the latter two genera do not take up fluorescent dyes as easily. The three genera are phylogenetically distinct. It is also similar to the genus Dictyococcus, but Dictyococcus has chloroplasts which are inflected inwards.

== Genera ==
As of February 2022, AlgaeBase accepted the following species:

- Bracteacoccus aerius H.W.Bischoff & Bold
- Bracteacoccus aggregatus Tereg
- Bracteacoccus anomalus (E.J.James) R.C.Starr
- Bracteacoccus bohemiensis Fuciková, Flechtner & L.A.Lewis
- Bracteacoccus bullatus Fuciková, Flechtner & L.A.Lewis
- Bracteacoccus deserticola Fuciková, Flechtner & L.A.Lewis
- Bracteacoccus giganteus H.W.Bischoff & Bold
- Bracteacoccus glacialis Fuciková, Flechtner & L.A.Lewis
- Bracteacoccus grandis H.W.Bischoff & Bold
- Bracteacoccus medionucleatus H.W.Bischoff & Bold
- Bracteacoccus minor (Schmidle ex Chodat) Petrová
- Bracteacoccus occidentalis Fuciková, Flechtner & L.A.Lewis
- Bracteacoccus polaris Fuciková, Flechtner & L.A.Lewis
- Bracteacoccus pseudominor H.W.Bischoff & Bold
- Bracteacoccus ruber Novis & Visnovsky
- Bracteacoccus xerophilus Fuciková, Flechtner & L.A.Lewis

A further species, Bracteacoccus helveticus (Kol & F.Chodat) Starr, was regarded as of "uncertain taxonomic status".
