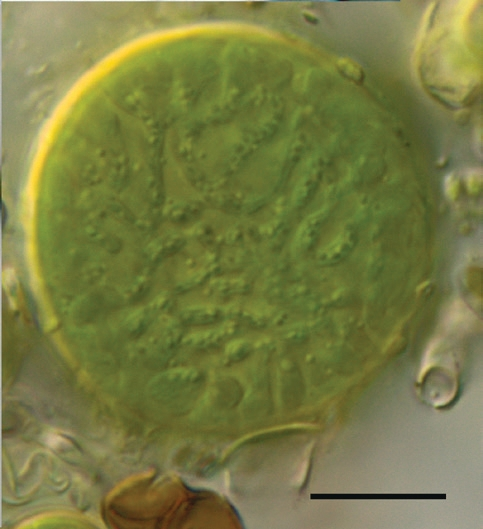
- Dictyochloropsis splendida

Scientific classification
- Kingdom: Plantae
- Division: Chlorophyta
- Class: Trebouxiophyceae
- Order: Trebouxiales
- Family: Trebouxiaceae
- Genus: Dictyochloropsis; Geitler (1966)

Species
- Dictyochloropsis reticulata; Dictyochloropsis splendida; "Dictyochloropsis asterochloroides"

= Dictyochloropsis =

Genus of algae

Dictyochloropsis is a genus of unicellular green alga of the phylum Chlorophyta. This genus consists of free-living algae which have a reticulate (net-like) chloroplast that varies slightly in morphology between species, and that when mature always lacks a pyrenoid. Dictyochloropsis is asexual and reproduces using autospores.

Previously, many species of the morphologically similar genus Symbiochloris were incorrectly classified to this taxon. These species were recently reclassified on the basis of molecular DNA analyses.

Dictyochloropsis is found in terrestrial environments all over the world, but can live and grow in freshwater environments as well. Recently, there has been promising research towards growing Dictyocloropsis in culture for the production of biofuels.

== Etymology ==
The name of Dictyochloropsis comes from the Greek language, and references the similar algal genus Dictyochloris. The suffix “-opsis” comes from “ὄψις” or “opsis”, roughly translating to “appearance,” “sight” or “view”. Therefore, “Dictyochloropsis” when translated from its Greek roots means “Dictyochloris-like”. In turn, the prefix “dictyo” is derived from the Greek word “δίκτυο” or “díktyo” meaning “network”, which is in reference to the net-like chloroplast present in this genus and Dictyochloropsis. The medial “-chloro-” is from “χλωρός” or “chloros” meaning “the colour green” because of the green pigment, chlorophyll, which colours the algae.

== History of knowledge ==
Dictyochloropsis was first identified as a genus in 1966 by Lothar Geitler, who defined it as a unicellular green algae with a complex chloroplast that reproduces using autospores. Geitler’s observations were not complete, he was unsure if he had correctly defined the new genus, and he requested supplementary observations from other scientists to attempt at further defining the taxon.

In the early 1980s, Elisabeth Tschermak-Woess used Geitler’s definition to classify several species of lichenized green algae under the same taxon. However, some of these algae reproduce with zoospores or aplanospores, which does not agree with Geitler’s observations.

In 2014, Francesco Dal Grande used microsatellite markers to discover that Dictyochloropsis as previously defined was polyphyletic, forming two distinct clades. The first clade is composed exclusively of free-living algae which reproduce using autospores. The second clade included lichenized as well as free-living algae that reproduce using zoospores or aplanospores. Organisms in both clades have similar morphologies and life cycles, and this is why they were initially classified in this polyphyletic genus.

In 2016, Pavel Skaloud et al. moved the Dictyochloropsis lichenized species to the genus Symbiochloris based on data from phylogenetic analysis of the 18S rRNA gene. As a result Dictyochloropsis was redefined to its current monophyletic meaning.

== Habitat and ecology ==
Dictyochloropsis is an ecologically important algae most commonly found living as an epiphyte or in soil. Although species in the phylum Chlorophyta mainly live in freshwater habitats, Dictyochloropsis is usually found in terrestrial environments. This algae does not feed, it uses photosynthesis to create its energy, and thus it only lives in habitats with access to light.

Species have been found and cultured from places all over the world, including the Czech Republic, Malaysia, Austria, Germany, Japan, Pakistan, Ukraine and Indonesia. Habitats which Dictyochloropsis has been cultured from include soil, tree bark, and hard surfaces such as rocks and concrete.

Dictyochloropsis is also able to survive and grow in freshwater environments. When isolated, Dictyochloropsis cultures are typically grown in nutrient-rich freshwater environments.

== Description ==
=== Morphology ===
Members of Dictyochloropsis are free-living, unicellular green algae. Their cells lack flagella and are globular at all life cycle stages. In this genus, young cells from autospores can be as small as 6 μm in diameter, and the largest species grow up to 50 μm in diameter before reproducing. The cell is often surrounded by a thick envelope of mucilage when mature. Their chloroplast gives Dictyochloropsis cells their characteristic green colour.

Their large, reticulate chloroplast is a key character used to identify this genus. At some ontogenetic stages, the chloroplast forms lobes in a parallel arrangement. When mature, the chloroplast lacks a pyrenoid. Chloroplast morphology can vary between members of Dictyochloropsis at the same life cycle stage, and is often used to identify specific species within this genus. For example, young D. splendida cells have parietal chloroplasts, while young D. asterochlorodies cells have asteroid chloroplasts.

Dictyochloropsis cells are uninucleate. Their nucleus is positioned centrally in the cell, and often the chloroplast approaches and surrounds it. As cells grow and produce chlorophyll, the nucleus is often difficult to see through the large chloroplast. Nevertheless, when high portions of the cell lumen fill with clear cytoplasm, the nucleus is revealed.

=== Life cycle ===
Dictyochloropsis reproduces asexually exclusively by means of autospores, which largely resemble the parent cell. Different species produce anywhere between 4 and 16 autospores each time they reproduce. Reproduction by autospores is one of the main ways in differentiating Dictyochloropsis from the morphologically similar Symbiochloris taxon.

When Dictyochloropsis cells are preparing to reproduce, the nucleus may first divide intracellularly depending on the number of autospores that will be produced. The number of nuclear divisions prior to cell division dictates the number of spores which will be produced, this can vary even between individuals in the same species. Next, autospores are produced inside the mother cell’s mucilage forming an autosporangium. When the spores are formed, the autosporangium decays by rupturing or dissolving, depending on the species.

As Dictyochloropsis cells prepare to divide, several intracellular changes happen to the chloroplast. The chloroplast's lobes widen, becoming denser and lighter in colour at the edges of the cell, and looser and darker at the center. This change indicates that thylakoids are grouping within the lumen. Lastly, the chloroplast’s lobes fuse into a single, more compact, granular structure surrounding the nucleus and divides into two parts. As the mother cell divides into autospores, several chloroplasts are produced for the resulting cells.

During reproduction, the chloroplast briefly becomes unilayered. As the cell then grows, the chloroplast undergoes longitudinal division producing the characteristic layered lobes.

== Practical importance ==
Culturing algae is one of the most promising fields for generating biofuels, due to their rapid growth rate and minimal nutrition requirements. Dictyochloropsis has been considered as a potential candidate to be farmed for the production of biofuels such as biodiesel, bioethanol and biohydrogen. When cultured under optimal conditions (20-30 °C in BG11 growth medium), Dictyochloropsis produces 21.8% biodiesel per gram of biomass, 175 μmol biohydrogen (mg chl a h−1)−1), and 0.236 g L−1 h−1 bioethanol. Interestingly, Dictyochloropsis produces more biohydrogen when incubated without glucose, rather than with it.
