= Dictyochloris =

Scientific classification
- Kingdom: Plantae
- Division: Chlorophyta
- Class: Chlorophyceae
- Order: Sphaeropleales
- Family: Dictyochloridaceae; Fučíková, P.O.Lewis & L.A.Lewis
- Genus: Dictyochloris; Vischer, 1945

Type species
- Dictyochloris fragrans Vischer

Species
- Dictyochloris fragrans; Dictyochloris pulchra

Genus of algae

Dictyochloris is a genus of green algae in the class Chlorophyceae. It is the sole genus of the family Dictyochloridaceae. It is commonly found in terrestrial and subaerial habitats.

The genus Dictyochloris was first described by Wilhelm Vischer in 1945. Later, it was re-investigated by Richard C. Starr in 1955. It is not to be confused with Dictyochloris Korshikov, which is a later (and thus illegitimate) homonym because it was described after Vischer used the name Dictyochloris. Because it is illegitimate, that genus was renamed to Dictyochlorella.

== Etymology ==
The scientific name Dictyochloris has roots in the Greek language. The prefix “dictyo” is derived from the Greek word “δίκτυο” or “díktyo” meaning “network”, which is in reference to the net-like chloroplast present in this genus. The medial “-chloro-” is from “χλωρός” or “chloros” meaning “the colour green” because of the green pigment, chlorophyll, which colors the algae.

== Description ==
Dictyochloris consists of solitary, spherical cells surrounded by a thin cell wall. Cells are coenocytic, i.e. have multiple nuclei. The chloroplast is net-like, parietal when young, developing into an irregular three-dimensional network. Chloroplasts lack pyrenoids.

Dictyochloris reproduces asexually via zoospores or aplanospores, which are produced when the mother cell's contents repeatedly undergo binary fission. Zoospores bear an eyespot and two flagella, one of which is slightly longer than the other.

The genus is morphologically similar to Dictyochloropsis, which also has chloroplasts in the form of an irregular, three-dimensional network of strands. However, Dictyochloropsis has one nucleus at maturity while Dictyochloris has multiple nuclei. Some Dictyochloropsis species have been transferred to a new genus, Symbiochloris.
