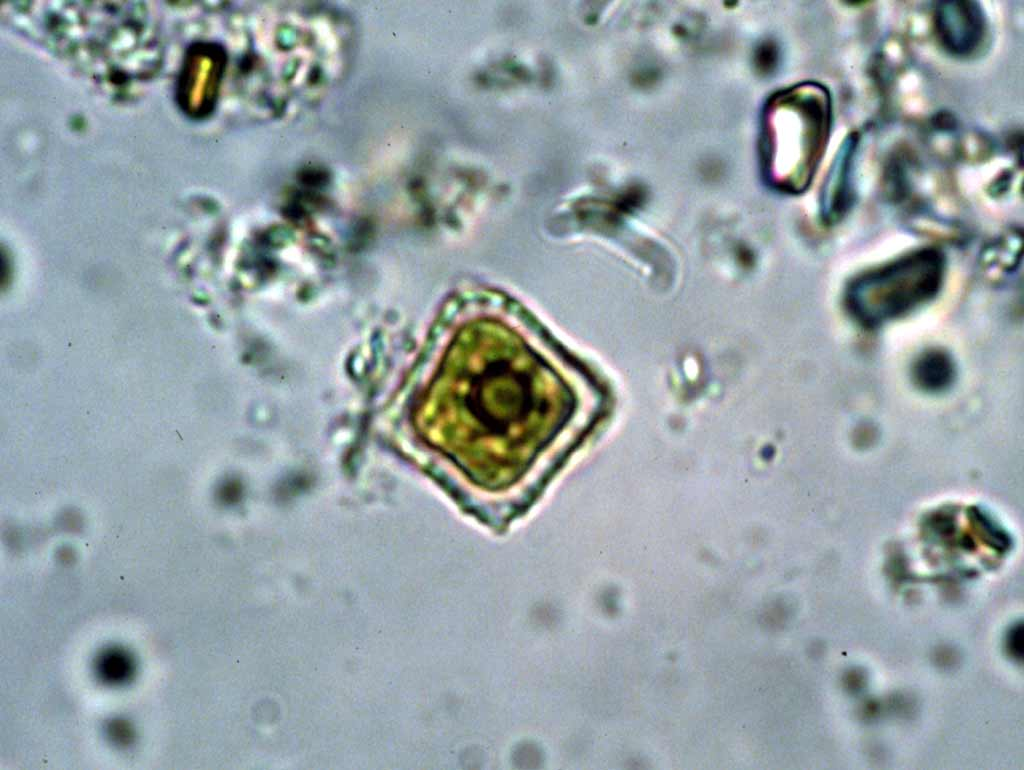

Scientific classification
- Clade: Viridiplantae
- Division: Chlorophyta
- Class: Chlorophyceae
- Order: Sphaeropleales
- Family: Hydrodictyaceae
- Genus: Tetraedron; Kützing, 1845

Type species
- Tetraedron regulare Kützing

Species
- See text

= Tetraedron =

Genus of algae

Tetraedron is a genus of green algae in the family Hydrodictyaceae. It may also be spelled as Tetraëdron.

== Description ==
Tetraedron consists of single, free-floating cells, making them phytoplankton. They are flattened, triangular, quadrangular, or irregularly polygonal in shape; old cells are nearly spherical. The cell wall is finely granulated when viewed with a light microscope. Cells contain a single nucleus and a single chloroplast which fills the cell; the chloroplast has a single pyrenoid with a starch sheath.

Tetraedron reproduces asexually by autospores; two, four, or eight autospores are formed in the mother cell and are released by rupture of the parent cell wall. Zoospores and sexual reproduction are unknown.

== Taxonomy ==
Tetraedron is currently placed in the family Hydrodictyaceae. Many species have been placed in this genera, on the basis of their polygonal shapes; however, many have been transferred to other genera. Among the green algae, the genus Chlorotetraedron appears similar, but differs from Tetraedron in its ability to produce zoospores.

Many species formerly included within the genus Tetraedron are now understood to be xanthophyte or eustigmatophyte algae, groups which are unrelated to Tetraedron. Segregate genera include Pseudostaurastrum, Goniochloris, Isthmochloron, Tetraedriella, Tetraplektron, and others.

Most species of Tetraedron are poorly characterized; only a few are well-defined.

- T. acutidens
- T. acutum
- T. arthrodesmiforme
- T. asymmetricum
- T. bifidum
- T. bifurcatum
- T. caudatum
- T. conicum
- T. constrictum
- T. crassidens
- T. crassispinum
- T. cruciatum
- T. cruciforme
- T. decussatum
- T. duospinum
- T. floridense
- T. gracile
- T. granulosum
- T. hemisphaericum
- T. hexacornicum
- T. horridum
- T. hortense
- T. lunula
- T. mainensis
- T. mediocris
- T. minimum
- T. minutissimum
- T. multispinosum
- T. obtusum
- T. octaedricum
- T. pachydermum
- T. paraincus
- T. pentaedricum
- T. proteiforme
- T. pulvinus
- T. pusillum
- T. quadricuspidatum
- T. rectangulare
- T. roldanii
- T. sexconicum
- T. simmeri
- T. smithii
- T. spiniferum
- T. staurastroides
- T. striatum
- T. triangulare
- T. trigonum
- T. trilobulatum
- T. tumidulum
- T. valdezii
- T. victoriae
- T. vulgare
- T. wasteneysii
