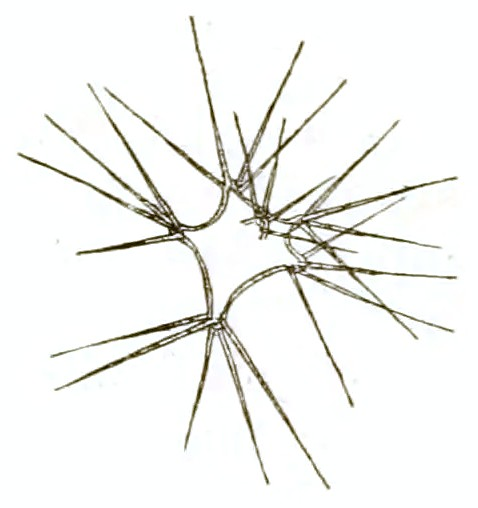
- Polyedriopsis spinulosa

Scientific classification
- Kingdom: Plantae
- Division: Chlorophyta
- Class: Chlorophyceae
- Order: Sphaeropleales
- Family: incertae sedis
- Genus: Polyedriopsis; Schmidle
- Species: P. spinulosa

Binomial name
- Polyedriopsis spinulosa (Schmidle) Schmidle

= Polyedriopsis =

Genus of algae

Polyedriopsis is a genus of green algae in the order Sphaeropleales. As of February 2022, it contained a single species, Polyedriopsis spinulosa. It is found worldwide in freshwater habitats as phytoplankton, but is rare.

Polyedriopsis spinulosa consists of solitary or sometimes clustered cells, 12–25 μm in diameter. They are four- or five-sided with concave sides; the corners are rounded off and bear a tuft of 3-10 thin tapering spines, 25–50 μm long. Cells are uninuclate (with one nucleus and contain a single parietal chloroplast with one pyrenoid.

Polyedriopsis spinulosa reproduces asexually via the formation of zoospores, of which 4 to 8 are produced per cell. Zoospores are ovate, with two flagella and a stigma.
