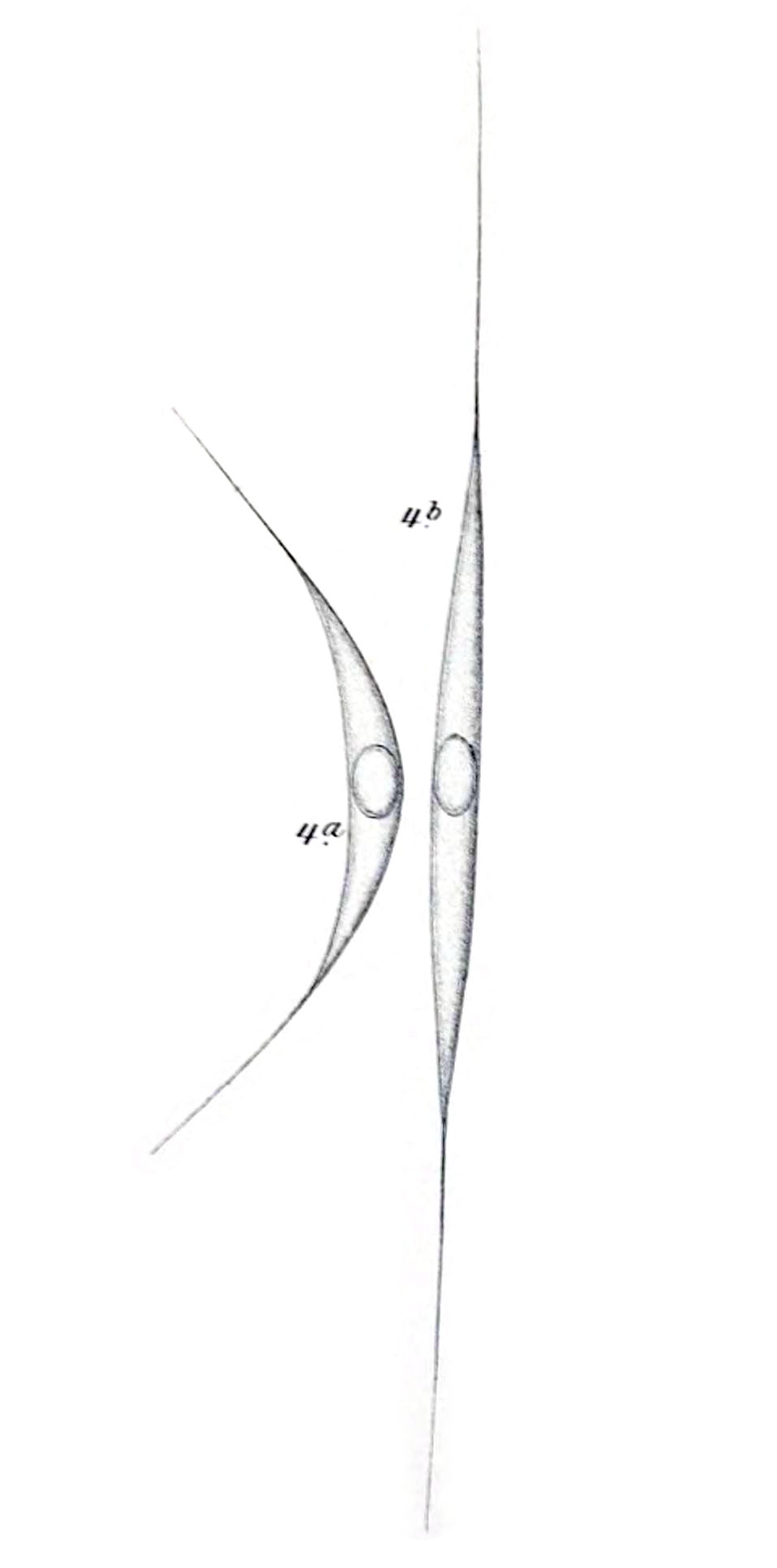
- Schroederia setigera

Scientific classification
- Clade: Viridiplantae
- Division: Chlorophyta
- Class: Chlorophyceae
- Order: Sphaeropleales
- Family: Schroederiaceae
- Genus: Schroederia; Lemmermann, 1898

Type species
- Schroederia setigera (Schröder) Lemmermann

= Schroederia (alga) =

Genus of algae

Schroederia is a genus of green algae in the family Schroederiaceae. Schroederiaceae is a monotypic taxon; Schroederia is its only genus.

The genus was circumscribed by Ernst Johann Lemmermann in Hedwigia vol.37 on page 311 in 1898. The genus name of Schroederia is in honour of Ludwig Julius Bruno Schröder (1867–1928), who was a German teacher, botanist (Algology and Bryology), also Hydrobiologist and Zoologist. He worked as a deputy head teacher in Breslau.

== Description ==
Schroederia consists of solitary cells that are needle- or spindle-shaped. They may be straight or curved. The cells end in long spines; at one end the spine may be bifurcated. Cells contain a single parietal chloroplast and one or several pyrenoids. As the cell matures, it develops multiple parietal chloroplasts along its long axis. Cells have one nucleus (uninucleate) when young but may become multinucleate.

Species are distinguished from one another by their overall shape and size.

== Reproduction ==
Schroederia reproduces exclusively by asexual means. Schroederia produces zoospores with two flagella, which are released when the mother cell's wall tears open. Zoospores contain a single contractile vacuole and a cup-shaped chloroplast with a single pyrenoid.

== Distribution ==
Schroederia is commonly found in as phytoplankton in freshwater habitats. It has an essentially cosmopolitan distribution, being found in tropical and temperate habitats worldwide.

== Species ==
As accepted by AlgaeBase;

- Schroederia ecsediensis Hortobágyi, 1960
- Schroederia indica Philipose, 1967
- Schroederia nitzschioides (G.S.West) Korschikov, 1953
- Schroederia planctonica (Skuja) Philipose, 1967
- Schroederia setigera (Schröder) Lemmermann, 1898
- Schroederia spiralis (Printz) Korshikov, 1953

Former species;

- S. ancora (G.M.Smith) G.M.Smith, 1933 accepted as Ankyra ancora (G.M.Smith) Fott, 1957 (synonym)
- S. antillarum Komárek, 1983 accepted as Pseudoschroederia antillarum (Komárek) Hegewald & Schnepf, 1986 (synonym)
- S. belonophora Schmidle, 1900 as Centritractus belenophorus (Schmidle) Lemmermann, 1900 (synonym)
- S. judayi G.M.Smith, 1916 accepted as Ankyra judayi (G.M.Smith) Fott, 1957
- S. robusta Korshikov, 1953 accepted as Pseudoschroederia robusta (Korshikov) E.Hegewald & E.Schnepf, 1986 (synonym)
