= Anton Hansgirg =

Austrian phycologist

Anton Hansgirg (June 16, 1854, in Prague – February 15, 1917, in Vienna) was a Bohemian-born Austrian phycologist who described several new species of red algae, green algae, and cryptophytes, in Austria-Hungary between 1880 and 1905.

Hansgirg studied from 1872 to 1876 at Charles University and passed in 1876 the teaching examination for secondary schools. In 1879 he received his doctorate. He taught at secondary schools in Prague from 1876 to 1877, in Königgrätz from 1877 to 1881, and then again in Prague. In 1885 he habilitated in botany at Charles University, where he taught as a Privatdozent and in 1893 was appointed a titular ausserordentlicher professor (an außerplanmäßiger appointment). In 1895 he went on a study trip to Buitenzorg in the Dutch East Indies. In 1903 he retired and moved to Vienna. His most important research is in phycology, in which he described many new species and published many valuable insights.

== Selected publications ==
- Prodromus der Algenflora von Böhmen. Erster Theil enthaltend die Rhodophyceen, Phaeophyceen und Chlorophyceen. Archiv für naturwissenschaftlichen Landesdurchforschung von Böhmen. Vol. Band 5, Nro. 6. Prague: Commissions-verlag von Fr. Řivnáč. 1888; 291 pp.
- Prodromus der Algenflora von Böhmen. Zweiter Theil, welcher die blaugrünen Algen (Myxophyceen, Cyanophyceen), nebst Nachträgen zum ersten Theile. Archiv für naturwissenschaftlichen Landesdurchforschung von Böhmen. Vol. Band 8, Nro. 4. Prague: Commissions-verlag von Fr. Řivnáč. 1892; 266 pp.
