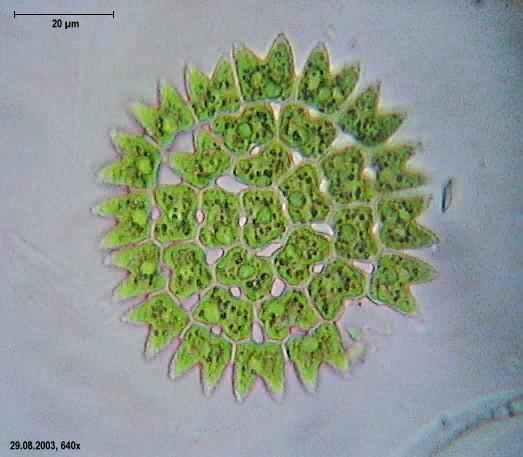
- Pediastrum duplex

Scientific classification
- Domain: Eukaryota
- Clade: Archaeplastida
- Clade: Viridiplantae
- Division: Chlorophyta
- Class: Chlorophyceae
- Order: Sphaeropleales
- Family: Hydrodictyaceae
- Genus: Pediastrum; Meyen, 1829

Type species
- Pediastrum duplex Meyen

Species
- Pediastrum angulatum; Pediastrum angulosum; Pediastrum aniae; Pediastrum argentinense; Pediastrum bareilliense; Pediastrum berolinense; Pediastrum bisnupurense; Pediastrum biwae; Pediastrum braunii; Pediastrum compactum; Pediastrum compactum; Pediastrum contiguum; Pediastrum diffusum; Pediastrum duplex; Pediastrum ellipticum; Pediastrum inconspicuum; Pediastrum indicum; Pediastrum janaktalense; Pediastrum lehense; Pediastrum leonensis; Pediastrum longicorne; Pediastrum magnum; Pediastrum marvillense; Pediastrum musterii; Pediastrum obtusum; Pediastrum orbitale; Pediastrum ovatum; Pediastrum pallidum; Pediastrum patagonicum; Pediastrum quadricornutum; Pediastrum sarmae; Pediastrum schroeteri; Pediastrum sculptatum; Pediastrum spinosum; Pediastrum taylorii; Pediastrum tetrapodum; Pediastrum tricuspidatum; Pediastrum tricyclium; Pediastrum triplex; Pediastrum wilsonii; Pediastrum wintonense

= Pediastrum =

Genus of green algae

Pediastrum is a genus of green algae, in the family Hydrodictyaceae. It is a photoautotrophic, nonmotile coenobial green alga that inhabits freshwater environments. The name Pediastrum comes from the Greek root words pedion, meaning "plane", and astron, meaning "star", referring to its overall shape.

== Morphology ==
Pediastrum develops colonies with a fixed number of cells, termed coenobia. In this case, the coenobia are composed of between 2^{2} and 2^{7} cells, which are orderly arranged in a flat disk. The diameter of a single coenobium ranges from 20 to 80 μm, making them microalgae. Cells in Pediastrum are dimorphic, consisting of interior cells and peripheral cells, distinguished by their position in the colony and by their shape. Some species have inter-cellular spaces between their interior cells. The peripheral cells surround the interior cells, and they usually possess bristles, V-like cutting edges, or wavy projections.

Pediastrum shows lots of morphological diversity, both between and within species. Although most species produce flat, circular coenobia, others produce coenobia that are more oval-shaped, or curved and bowl-shaped. For species identification, the shape of the cells (particularly marginal ones), presence or absence of intercellular gaps, and ornamentation of the cell wall are all important distinguishing characteristics.

== Phylogeny ==
The genus of Pediastrum belongs to the Hydrodictyaceae family, along with Pseudopediastrum, Tetraedron, Hydrodictyon and so on. Pediastrum spp. on the phylogenetic tree can be divided into Group I, Group II, Group III. Group I, which includes Pediastrum duplex, are mainly distributed in North America and Europe. Group II is mostly from Australia, containing among others P. angulosum and P. alternans. Group I, Group II form a monophyletic group (clade) in the phylogenetic tree together with Hydrodictyon spp. lastly, Group III forms a sister group with Monactinus spp.

For the morphological characteristics of these groups, Group I has intracellular spaces and V-like incisions in the cells along the outside, while some species in Group II lack intercellular spaces, and their peripheral cells are wavy. Although there are significant differences between the appearance of Pediastrum and Hydrodictyon, it is still related more closely to it than several genera that look more alike, such as Pseudopediastrum, Monactinus and Stauridium.

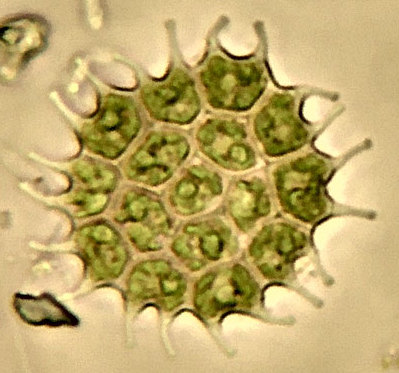
Pediastrum

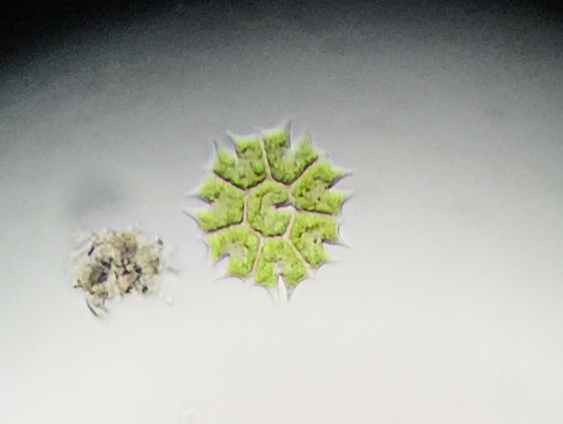
Stauridium tetras

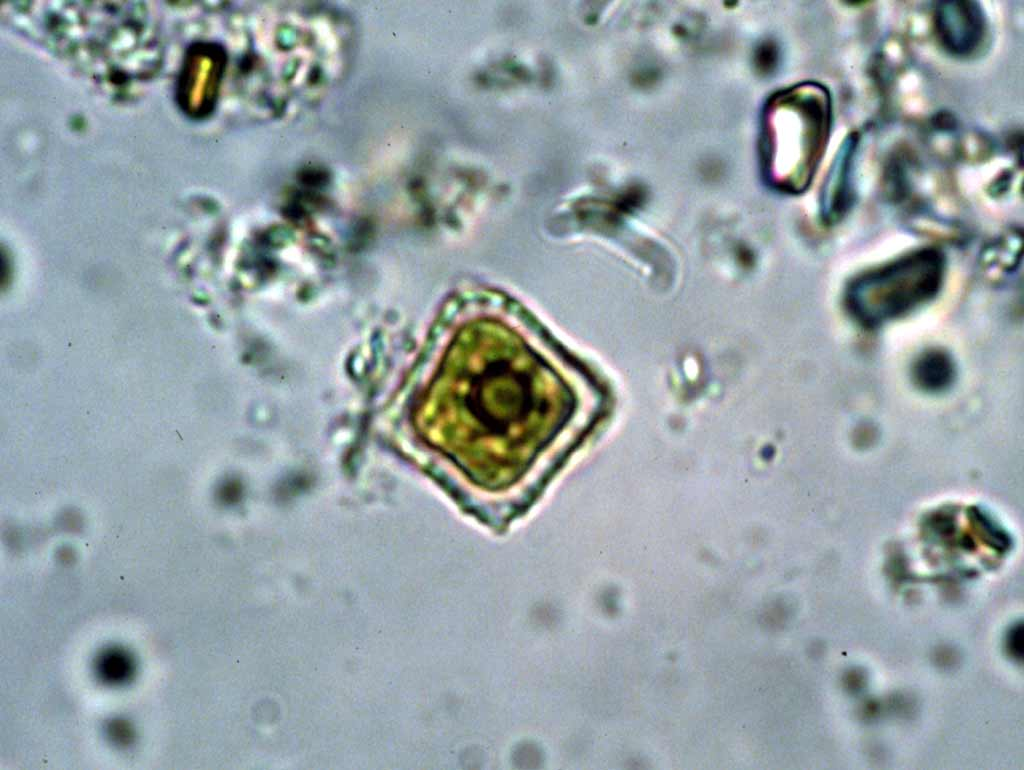
Tetraedron

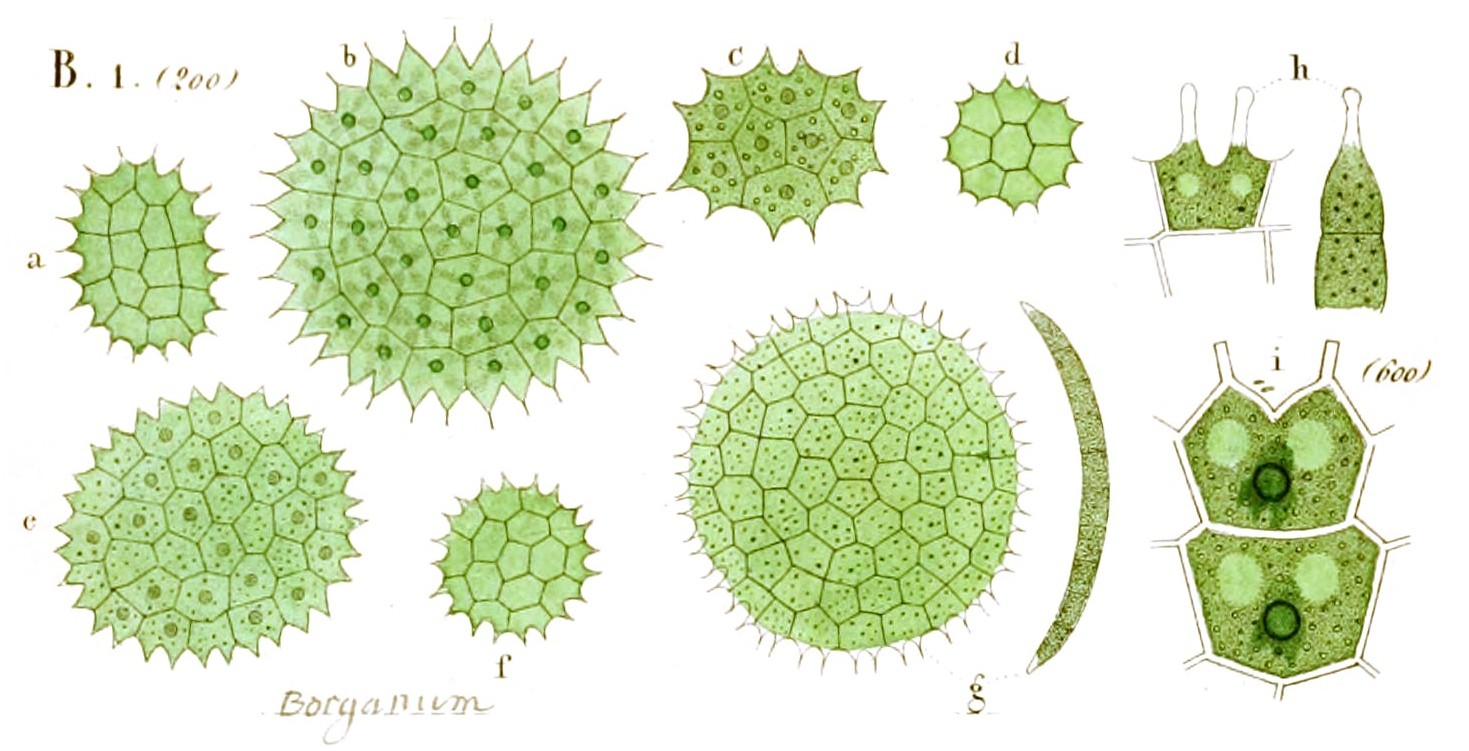
Pseudopediastrum boryanum

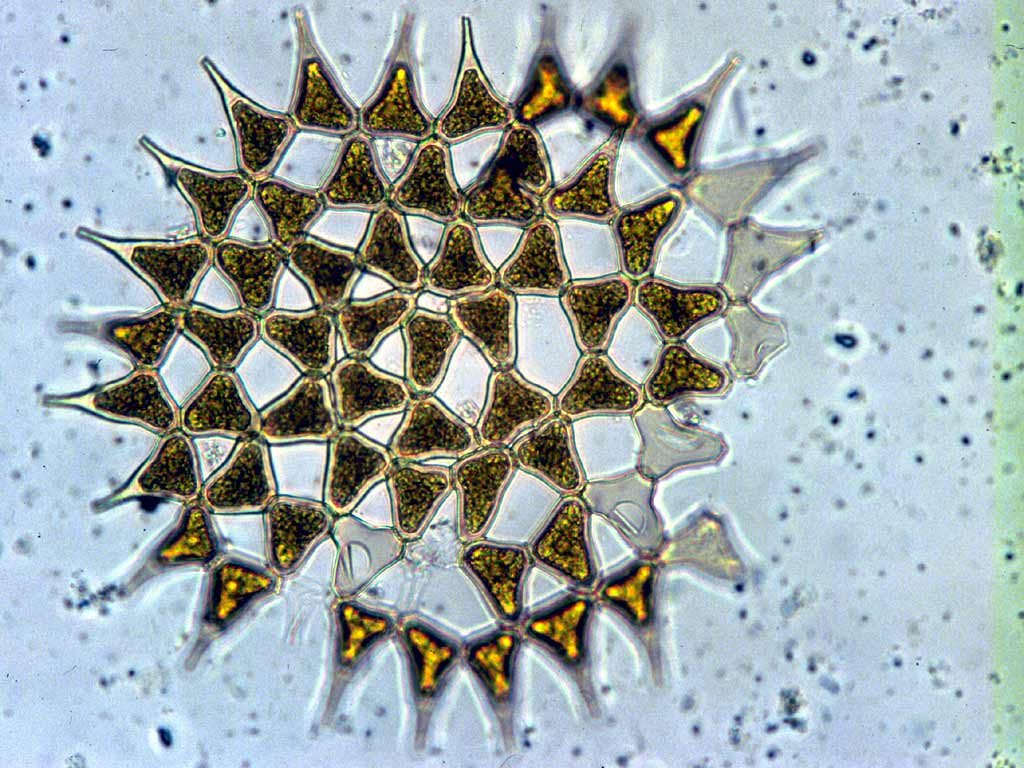
Monactinus simplex

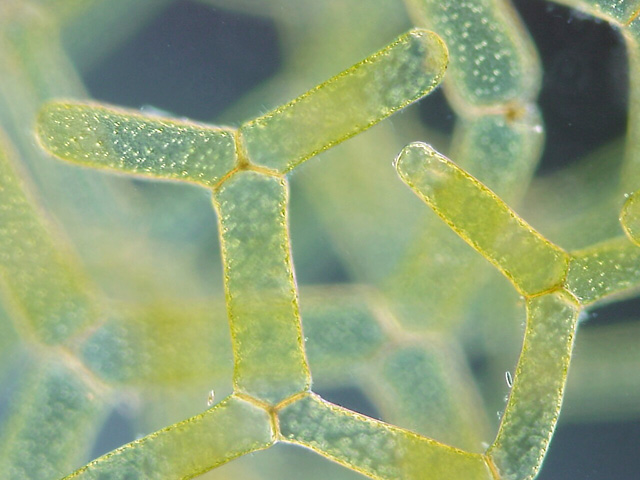
Hydrodictyon reticulatum

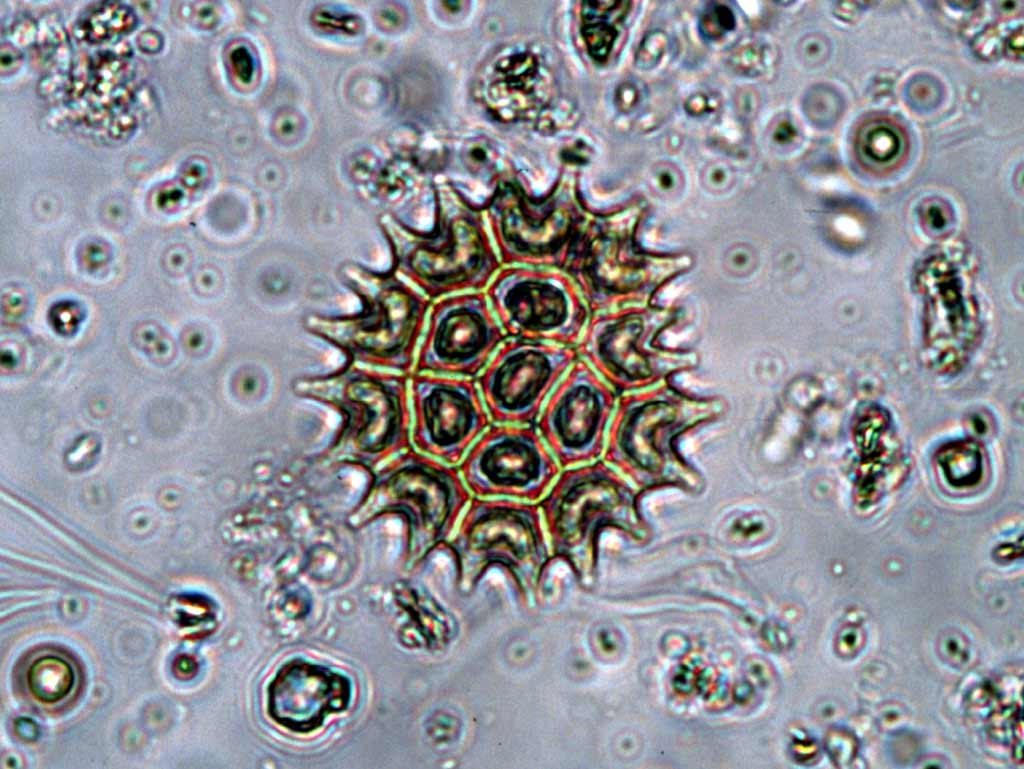
Pediastrum boryanum

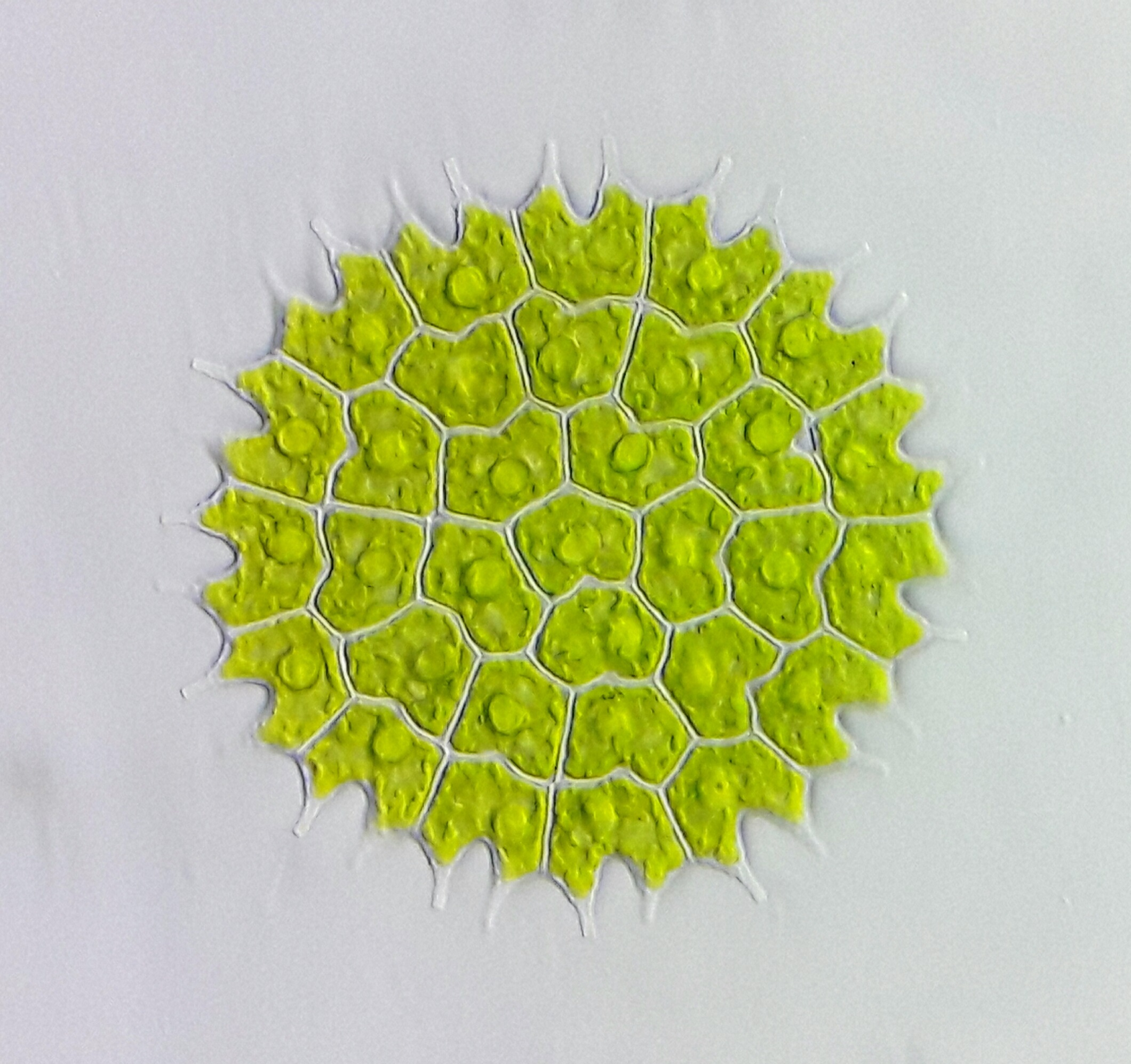
Colony of Pediastrum algae

Colony of Pediastrum algae surrounded by debris

== Fossil record ==
Cell walls of Pediastrum form a "globular network" with interconnected nodes. These walls are difficult to break down due to the presence of sporopollenin and silica, which the algae uses to defend itself against infection. This also coincidentally makes it very resistant to diagenesis. Because of this, Pediastrum is known to have existed since the Early Cretaceous. In 2005, several studies on the fossil record of Pediastrum were compiled, and 10 species in the genus are now recognized between the Late Cretaceous and the Quaternary in southern South America alone.

== Use as a bioindicator ==
The genus Pediastrum is present all around the world, and they are usually found in sediments of freshwater lakes or wetlands. The strong cell walls of Pediastrum make them preserve very well in sediments. The cell clusters retain their morphology, some organelles inside, and genetic materials for thousands of years. The cell walls can survive the harsh chemical treatments used to prepare samples in palynology, allowing them to still be identified to a species level in pollen samples, which is uncommon in that field of study. These special characteristics make Pediastrum useful as a bioindicator. Therefore, Pediastrum is very useful in the fields of paleoecology and paleolimnology. For example, Pediastrum is absent or decreased when less aquatic plants are present, allowing one to determine the health of an aquatic ecosystem even when no direct information about aquatic plant life is present in a sample. Dissolved organic carbon (DOC) and pH value are the main environmental variables that affect the distribution of Pediastrum. Because of this, sediment-preserved Pediastrum spp. helps correlate community changes and nutrient availability, and can be a useful indicator for the reconstruction of paleoenvironments.

== Life cycle ==
Pediastrum possesses a haplontic life cycle, and can be divided into three types. The most commonly seen is the first kind of asexual life cycle (ALC1), which generates autocolonies. In ALC1 the zoospores aggregate into an orderly flat disk, with concentric rings (central cell, six cells, and then nine cells.) Afterwards, the peripheral cells grow in one or two spines from the external wall. The second asexual life cycle (ALC2,) is a single celled version of the former. The vesicle that contains the zoospores breaks down immediately after formation, and individual cells grow until maturity, forming motile zoospores. Each cell can then go on to generate a daughter colony with exactly the same number and arrangement of cells as the parent colony. As for the Sexual life cycle in Pediastrum, the cell forms two bi-flagellate gametes (isogamy), these then fuse into a zygote and develop further through the asexual lifecycle as described before.

The second asexual and sexual life cycles are rarely observed in Pediastrum, and only occur in very bright conditions or in high temperatures.
