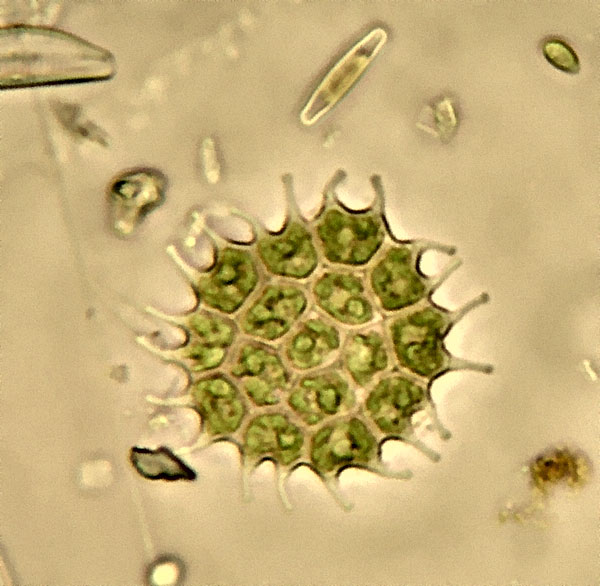
- Pediastrum

Scientific classification
- Kingdom: Plantae
- Division: Chlorophyta
- Class: Chlorophyceae
- Order: Sphaeropleales
- Family: Hydrodictyaceae; Dumortier, 1829

Genera
- See text

= Hydrodictyaceae =

Family of algae

Hydrodictyaceae is a family of green algae in the order Sphaeropleales. They are found in freshwater habitats worldwide.

Members of this family are either unicellular or colonial. Cells are cylindrical, polyhedral, spherical, or sometimes nearly spherical. Cells contain a single parietal, chloroplast with a pyrenoid. The cell wall may be smooth or covered in warts, ribs or other ornamentation.

Reproduction can occur asexually or sexually. In asexual reproduction, the mother cell becomes a number of zoospores and swim inside the enlarged mother cell wall, until they attach to each other and become a new colony. In Tetraedron, the cells do not produce zoospores but produce autospores within the enlarged mother cell wall. Sexual reproduction, when observed, occurs via isogamous gametes.

Because the cell wall of some Hydrodictyaceae contain sporopollenin, they decay very slowly and thus last long in the fossil record.

== Genera ==
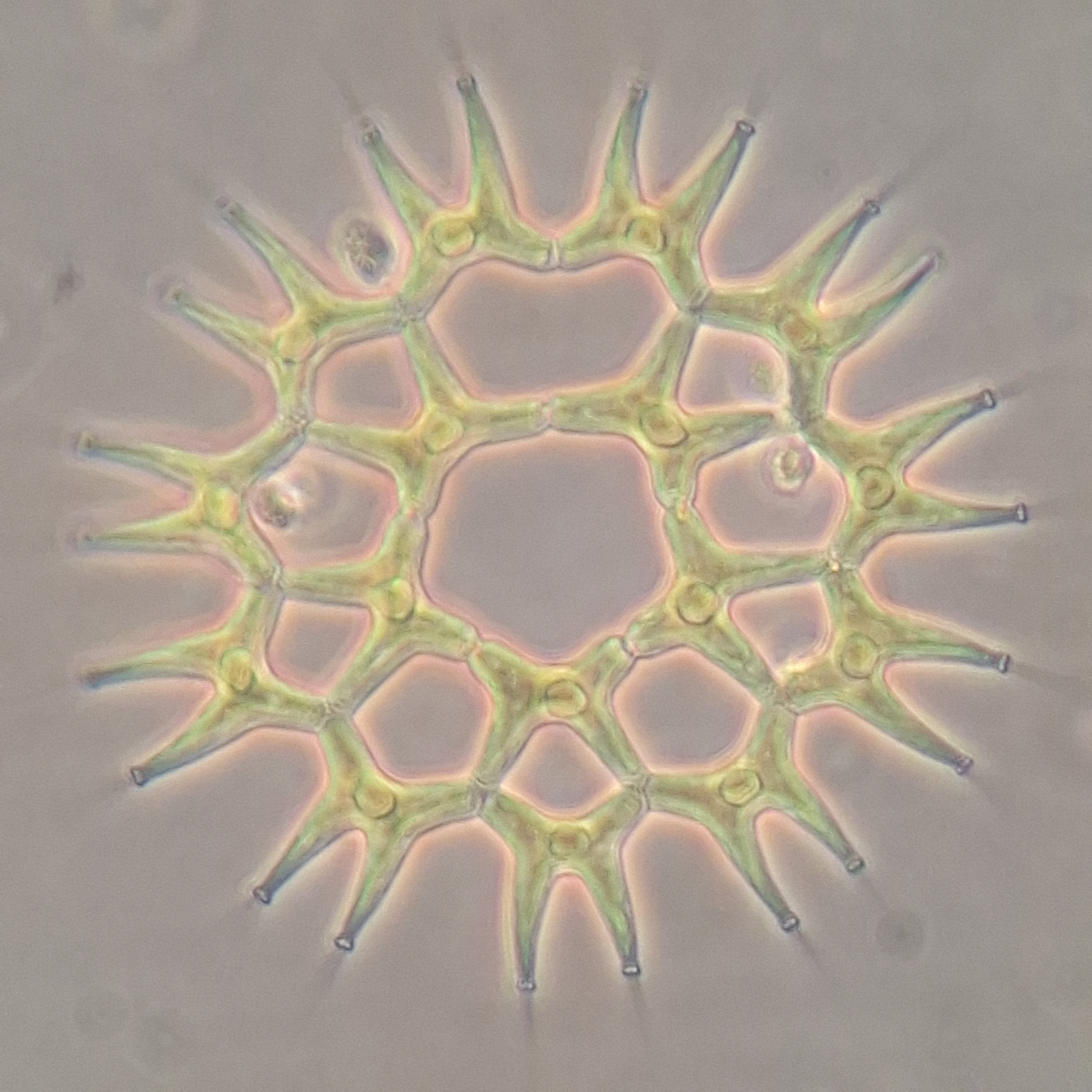
Lacunastrum gracilimum, a species of the family.

The family Hydrodictyaceae includes the following genera:

- Euastropsis
- Helierella
- Hydrodictyon
- †Hydrodictyopsis
- Lacunastrum
- Monactinus
- Parapediastrum
- †Pediastrites
- Pediastrum
- Pseudopediastrum
- Sorastrum
- Sphaerastrum
- Stauridium
- Tetraedroides
- Tetraedron
- Tetrapedia

Traditionally, the genus Tetraedron was excluded and placed within the Chlorellaceae, because of autospore formation. However, the genus produces autospores within an enlarged cell wall, similar to Pediastrum, and molecular phylogenetic evidence shows that they are related.

Molecular phylogenetic studies suggest the following relationships:

- Hydrodictyaceae
  - - - - - Pediastrum
          - Hydrodictyon
        - Pseudopediastrum
      - - Monactinus
        - Lacunastrum
    - - Stauridium
      - Euastropsis
    - Parapediastrum
    - Sorastrum
  - Tetraedron
- Neochloridaceae (outgroup)
