= Water net =

Scientific classification
- Kingdom: Plantae
- Division: Chlorophyta
- Class: Chlorophyceae
- Order: Sphaeropleales
- Family: Hydrodictyaceae
- Genus: Hydrodictyon; Roth

Type species
- Hydrodictyon reticulatum (Linnaeus) Bory

Species
- Hydrodictyon africanum; Hydrodictyon indicum; Hydrodictyon patenaeforme; Hydrodictyon reticulatum

Genus of algae

The water net (genus Hydrodictyon) is a taxon of freshwater green algae in the family Hydrodictyaceae. Hydrodictyon does well in clean, eutrophic water, and has become a nuisance in New Zealand, where it has been recently introduced. The name water net comes from the mesh structure of their colonies, which can extend several decimeters; the scientific name also means "water net" in Greek.

Hydrodictyon consists of colonies of cylindrical cells that are joined end-to-end to form a net-like structure. The cells usually form pentagonal or hexagonal subgroups. Cells contain a parietal chloroplast with many small pyrenoids.

== Reproduction ==
Algae in the genus can reproduce asexually or sexually. Asexual reproduction takes place by biflagellated (having two flagella) zoospores formed by the thousands inside a cell. However, the zoospores hardly move, as they are packed very densely. The zoospores form a cell wall, become cylindrical in shape, and arrange themselves in a hexagonal pattern, much like the mature tissue. The mother cell disintegrates, releasing the microscopic daughter net.

During sexual reproduction, which takes place by iso-gametes (gametes of the same size) even smaller than the zoospores, the iso-gametes escape through a hole in the cell wall of the mother cell. Two gametes fuse, forming a zygote, which then develops a thick cell wall and becomes angular in shape. After a rest period, 2-5 zoospores, which are bigger than the ones formed by asexual reproduction, are produced. The zoospores then enlarge into polygonal cells. The cytoplasm of the cells then divide into new zoospores which lose their flagella and form a new net by lying against each other.
