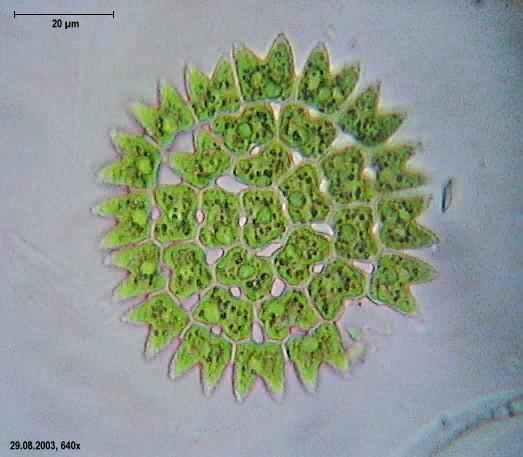
- Pediastrum duplex, an algae within the order Sphaeropleales

Scientific classification
- Domain: Eukaryota
- Supergroup: Archaeplastida
- Clade: Viridiplantae
- Division: Chlorophyta
- Class: Chlorophyceae
- Order: Sphaeropleales; Luerssen

Families
- Bracteacoccaceae; Bracteamorphaceae; Characiaceae; Chromochloridaceae; Cylindrocapsaceae; Dictyochloridaceae; Dictyococcaceae; Hydrodictyaceae; Microsporaceae; Mychonastaceae; Neochloridaceae; Nephrocytiaceae; Pseudomuriellaceae; Radiococcaceae; Rotundellaceae; Scenedesmaceae; Schizochlamydaceae; Schroederiaceae; Selenastraceae; Sphaeropleaceae; Treubariaceae; Tumidellaceae; incertae sedis: Polyedriopsis

= Sphaeropleales =

Order of algae

Sphaeropleales is an order of green algae that used to be called Chlorococcales. The order includes some of the most common freshwater planktonic algae such as Scenedesmus and Pediastrum. The Sphaeropleales includes vegetatively non-motile unicellular, colonial, or filamentous taxa. They have biflagellate zoospores with flagella that are directly opposed in direction (the DO arrangement): Sphaeroplea, Atractomorpha, Neochloris, Hydrodictyon, and Pediastrum. All of these taxa have basal body core connections. Motile cells generally lack cell walls or have only a very fine layer surrounding the cell membrane. Other common characteristics include a robust vegetative cell wall, cup-shaped chloroplasts with large pyrenoids, and relatively large nuclei.

With an increase in the number of taxa for which sequence data are available, there is evidence of an expanded DO clade that includes additional zoosporic (Bracteacoccus, Schroederia) and some strictly autosporic genera such as Ankistrodesmus, Scenedesmus, Selenastrum, and Monoraphidium. The filamentous Microspora has been allied with the coccoid genus Bracteacoccus based on molecular data.

Monophyly of the DO clade is supported by phylogenetic analysis of multi-gene data.

== Phylogeny ==
Modern molecular phylogenetics suggest the following relationships (not all families are included):

- Sphaeropleales
  - - - - - - - - - - Schizochlamydaceae
                    - - Tumidellaceae
                      - Bracteamorphaceae
                  - - Pseudomuriellaceae
                    - Radiococcaceae
                - Bracteacoccaceae
              - - Nephrocytiaceae
                - Chromochloridaceae
            - Schroederiaceae
          - - Neochloridaceae
            - Hydrodictyaceae
        - - - Selenastraceae
            - Dictyococcaceae
          - - Rotundellaceae
            - Scenedesmaceae
      - Mychonastaceae
    - Dictyochloridaceae
  - Sphaeropleaceae

Taxonomists have had difficulties classifying Characiaceae and Microsporaceae using molecular genetics, because the taxonomic affiliations of the type species are unclear. At least some of their taxa are known to related to genera within Sphaeropleales, but others are not. Additionally, the placement of the type family, Sphaeropleaceae, is problematic because some phylogenetic analyses find the family to be unrelated to the rest of the order.
