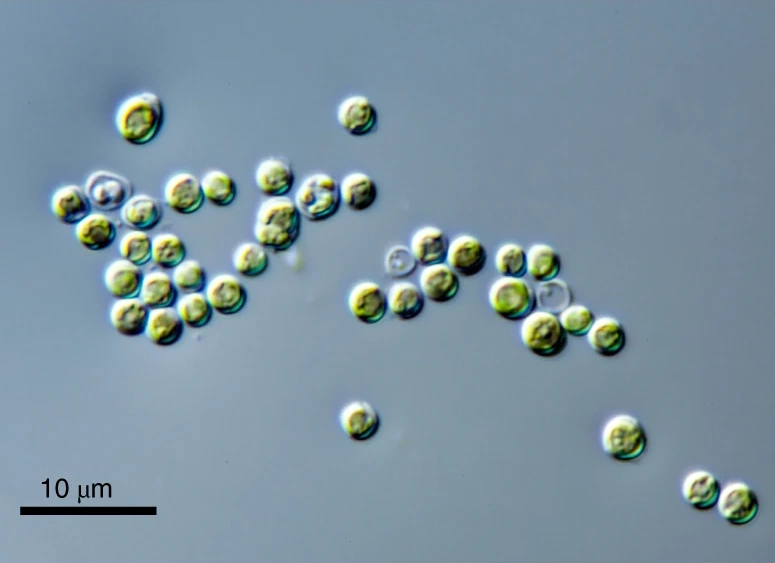
- Prasinoderma under light microscopy

Scientific classification
- Domain: Eukaryota
- Clade: Archaeplastida
- Clade: Viridiplantae
- Division: Prasinodermophyta; Marin & Melkonian in Li et al. 2020

Classes
- Prasinodermophyceae; Palmophyllophyceae

Synonyms
- Palmophyllophyta; Prasinodermatophyta Marin & Melkonian in Li et al. 2020

= Prasinodermophyta =

Phylum of green algae

The Prasinodermophyta are a proposed basal division of marine algae from the green algae clade Viridiplantae, sister to the much larger clades Chlorophyta and Streptophyta, the latter of which gave rise to all land plants (embryophytes). It consists of two classes Prasinodermophyceae and Palmophyllophyceae, and is informally called prasinodermophytes. They were previously considered to be a basal Chlorophyta clade, or part of the "prasinophytes".

- Viridiplantae/ green algae
  - Prasinodermophyta
    - Palmophyllophyceae (prasinophyte clade VI)
    - Prasinodermophyceae
  - - Chlorophyta
    - Streptophyta/ Charophyta
      - Mesostigmatophyceae
        - Mesostigma viride
        - - Spirotaenia
          - Chlorokybophyceae
      - - Streptofilum
        - - Klebsormidiophyceae
          - Phragmoplastophyta
            - Charophyceae
            - - Coleochaetophyceae
              - - Zygnematophyceae
                - Embryophytes (land plants)
