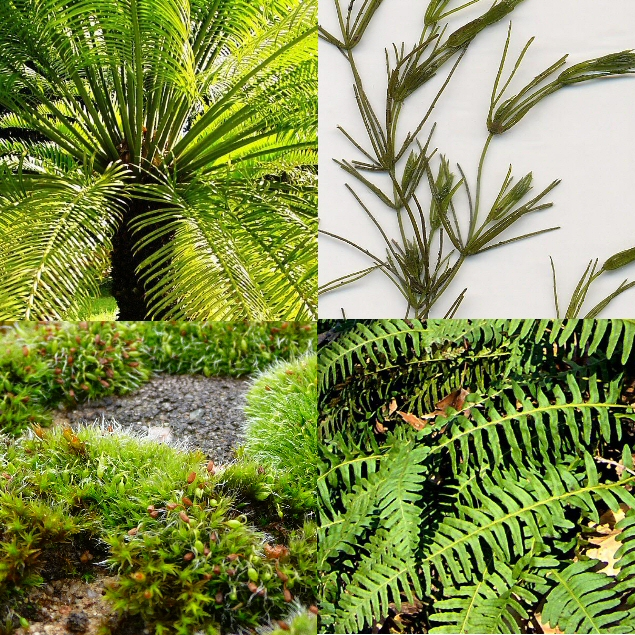
- Examples of phragmoplastophytes: top left, Cycas circinalis; top right, Chara globularis; bottom left, various mosses; bottom right, Polypodium virginianum

Scientific classification
- Domain: Eukaryota
- Supergroup: Archaeplastida
- Clade: Viridiplantae
- Clade: Streptophyta
- Clade: Phragmoplastophyta; Lecointre & Guyader 2006

Subclades
- Charophyceae; Coleochaetophyceae; Zygnematophyceae; Embryophyta (land plants)

= Phragmoplastophyta =

Clade of plants

The Phragmoplastophyta (Lecointre & Guyader 2006) are a sister clade of the Klebsormidiaceae in the Streptophyte/Charophyte clade. The Phragmoplastophyta consist of the Charophyceae and another unnamed clade which contains the Coleochaetophyceae, Zygnematophyceae, Mesotaeniaceae, and Embryophytes (land plants). It is an important step in the emergence of land plants within the green algae. It is equivalent to the ZCC clade/grade, cladistically granting the Embryophyta.

The mitosis of Phragmoplastophyta takes place via a phragmoplast.

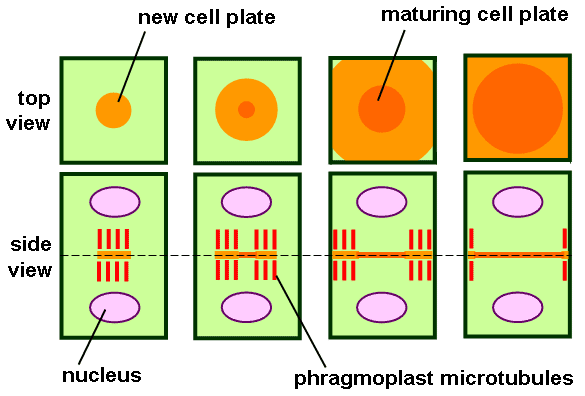
Phragmoplast and cell plate formation in a plant cell during cytokinesis. Left side: Phragmoplast forms and cell plate starts to assemble in the center of the cell. Towards the right: Phragmoplast enlarges in a donut-shape towards the outside of the cell, leaving behind mature cell plate in the center. The cell plate will transform into the new cell wall once cytokinesis is complete.

Another synapomorphy of this clade is the synthesis of cellulose microfibrils by a complex of octameric cellulose synthetases. This complex crosses the plasma membrane and polymerizes molecules from the cytoplasm into cellulose microfibrils, which, together with each other, form fibrils, necessary in the formation of the wall. The Phragmoplastophyte wall is also formed of phenolic compounds.

It is within Phragmoplastophyta we find the three clades of charophyte/streptophyte algae with true multicellular organization with differentiated cell types; Charophyceae, Coleochaetophyceae and land plants. The other charophyte algae are either unicellular, colonial, sarcinoid (three-dimensional packets of cells) or unbranched filamentous.

Below is a consensus reconstruction of green algal relationships, mainly based on molecular data.

- Viridiplantae
  - Prasinodermophyta
    - Palmophyllophyceae (prasinophyte clade VI)
    - Prasinodermophyceae
  - - Chlorophyta
    - Streptophyta
      - - Mesostigmatophyceae
        - - Spirotaenia
          - Chlorokybophyceae
      - - Streptofilum
        - - Klebsormidiophyceae
          - Phragmoplastophyta
            - Charophyceae
            - - Coleochaetophyceae
              - - Zygnematophyceae
                - Embryophytes (land plants)
