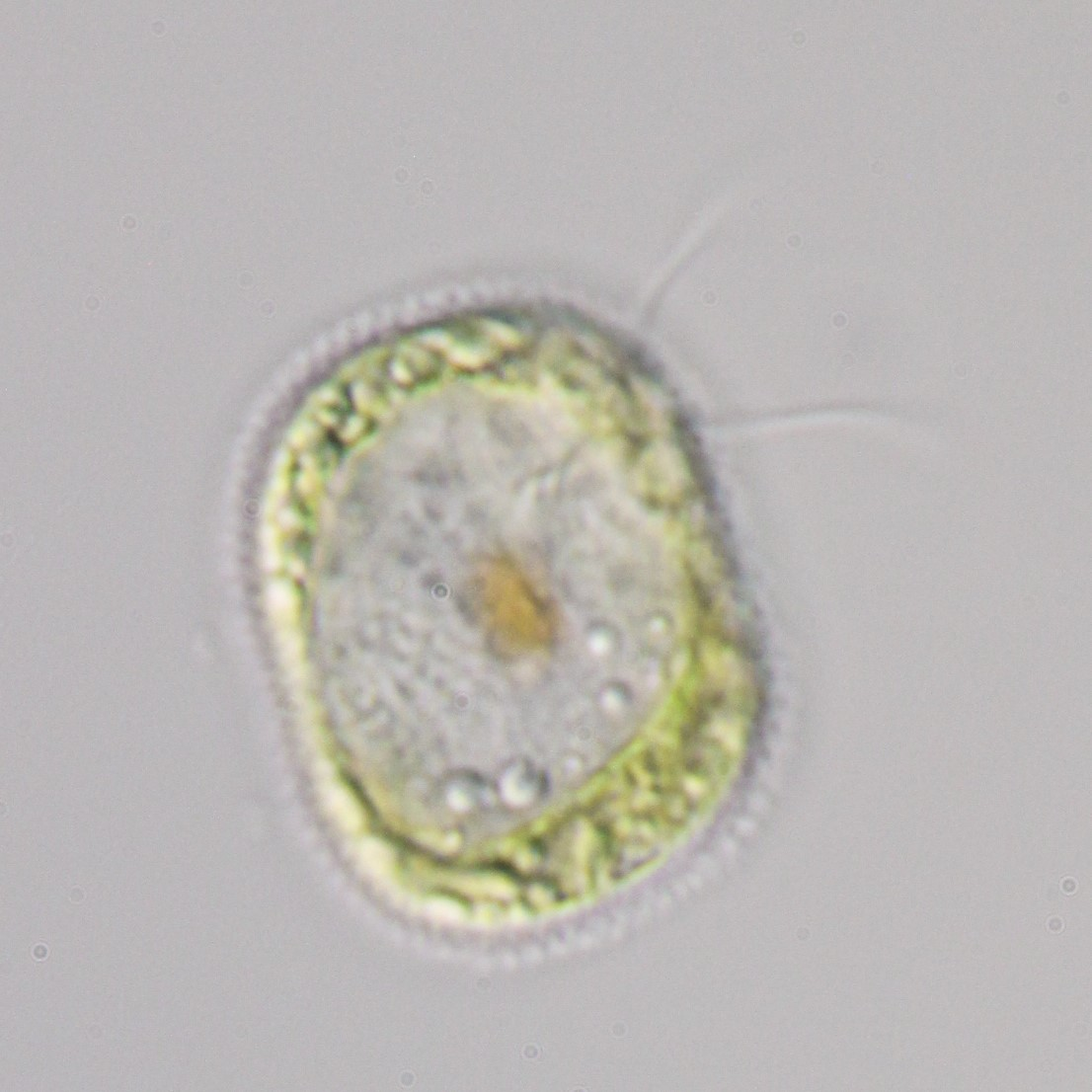

Scientific classification
- Kingdom: Plantae
- Class: Mesostigmatophyceae
- Order: Mesostigmatales; Marin & Melkonian
- Family: Mesostigmataceae; Marin & Melkonian
- Genus: Mesostigma; Lauterborn
- Species: M. viride

Binomial name
- Mesostigma viride Lauterborn

= Mesostigma =

Mesostigma viride

Genus of algae

Mesostigma is a genus of unicellular biflagellate freshwater green algae, with a single species Mesostigma viride, covered by an outer layer of basket‐like scales instead of a cell wall. It is the only known genus in the class Mesostigmatophyceae (and thus, the only genus in the family Mesostigmataceae and the order Mesostigmatales).

Earlier studies were unable to resolve the position of the species, and it was often placed as a sister to all other green algae, as one of the basal members of the Streptophyta, close to Chaetosphaeridium. More recent studies agree that Mesostigma and Chlorokybus form a clade, being the earliest diverging of the green plants, specifically within Charophytes.
