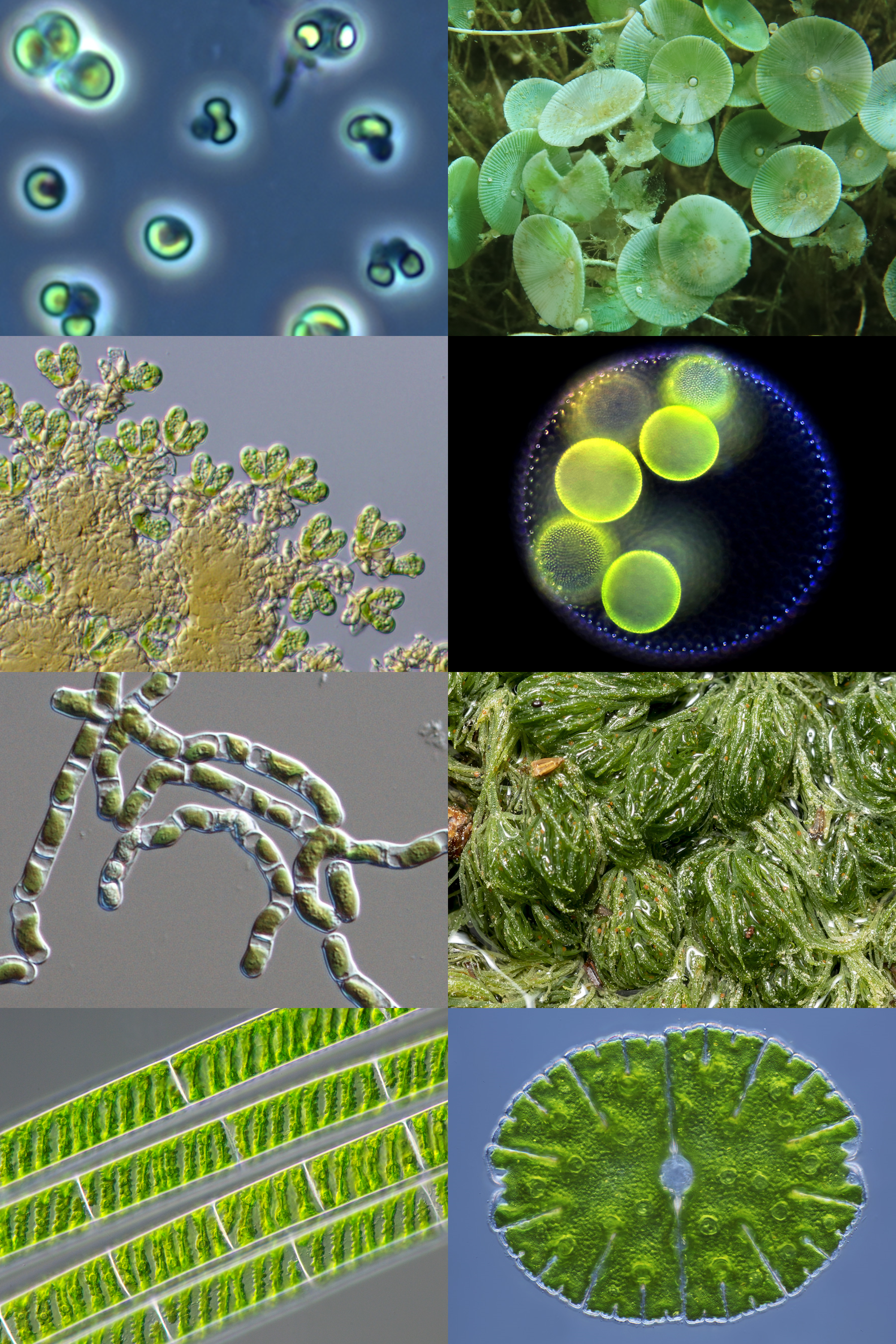
- Green algal diversity. From top left corner: Picocystis (Picocystophyceae), Acetabularia (Ulvophyceae), Botryococcus (Trebouxiophyceae), Volvox (Chlorophyceae), Klebsormidium (Klebsormidiophyceae), Chara (Charophyceae), Spirogyra and Micrasterias (Zygnematophyceae)

Scientific classification
- Domain: Eukaryota
- Clade: Archaeplastida
- Clade: Viridiplantae

Groups included
- Prasinodermophyta; Chlorophyta; Mesostigmatophyceae; Klebsormidiophyceae; Chlorokybophyceae; Coleochaetophyceae; Charophyceae; Zygnematophyceae; Phragmoplastophyta; Streptofilum

Excluded (but cladistically included)
- Embryophyta

= Green algae =

Paraphyletic group of eukaryotes

The green algae (sing.: green alga) are a group of chlorophyll-containing autotrophic algae consisting of the phylum Prasinodermophyta and its unnamed sister group that contains the Chlorophyta and Charophyta/Streptophyta. The land plants (Embryophyta) have emerged deep within the charophytes as a sister of the Zygnematophyceae. Since the realization that the Embryophyta emerged within the green algae, some authors are starting to include them. The completed clade that includes both green algae and embryophytes is monophyletic and is referred to as the clade Viridiplantae and as the kingdom Plantae. The green algae include unicellular and colonial flagellates, most with two flagella per cell, as well as various colonial, coccoid (spherical), and filamentous forms, and macroscopic, multicellular seaweeds. There are about 22,000 species of green algae, many of which live most of their lives as single cells, while other species form coenobia (colonies), long filaments, or highly differentiated macroscopic seaweeds.

A few other organisms rely on green algae to conduct photosynthesis for them. The chloroplasts in dinoflagellates of the genus Lepidodinium, euglenids and chlorarachniophytes were acquired from ingested endosymbiont green algae, and in the latter retain a nucleomorph (vestigial nucleus). Green algae are also found symbiotically in the ciliate Paramecium, and in Hydra viridissima and in flatworms. Some species of green algae, particularly of genera Trebouxia of the class Trebouxiophyceae and Trentepohlia (class Ulvophyceae), can be found in symbiotic associations with fungi to form lichens. In general, the fungal species that partner in lichens cannot live on their own, while the algal species is often found living in nature without the fungus. Trentepohlia is a filamentous green alga that can live independently on humid soil, rocks or tree bark or form the photosymbiont in lichens of the family Graphidaceae. Also the macroalga Prasiola calophylla (Trebouxiophyceae) is terrestrial, and Prasiola crispa, which live in the supralittoral zone, is terrestrial and can in the Antarctic form large carpets on humid soil, especially near bird colonies.

== Cellular structure ==
Green algae have chloroplasts that contain chlorophyll a and b, giving them a bright green color, as well as the accessory pigments beta carotene (red-orange) and xanthophylls (yellow) in stacked thylakoids. A few exceptions are the lineages Polytomella, Polytoma, Helicosporidium and Prototheca, which have lost their chlorophyll. The cell walls of green algae usually contain cellulose, and they store carbohydrate in the form of starch.

All green algae have mitochondria with flat cristae. When present, paired flagella are used to move the cell. They are anchored by a cross-shaped system of microtubules and fibrous strands. Flagella are only present in the motile male gametes of charophytes, bryophytes, pteridophytes, cycads and Ginkgo, but are absent from the gametes of Pinophyta and flowering plants.

Members of the class Chlorophyceae undergo closed mitosis in the most common form of cell division among the green algae, which occurs via a phycoplast. By contrast, charophyte green algae and land plants (embryophytes) undergo open mitosis without centrioles. Instead, a 'raft' of microtubules, the phragmoplast, is formed from the mitotic spindle and cell division involves the use of this phragmoplast in the production of a cell plate.

== Origins ==
Photosynthetic eukaryotes originated following a primary endosymbiotic event, where a heterotrophic eukaryotic cell engulfed a photosynthetic cyanobacterium-like prokaryote that became stably integrated and eventually evolved into a membrane-bound organelle: the plastid. This primary endosymbiosis event gave rise to three autotrophic clades with primary plastids: the (green) plants (with chloroplasts), the red algae (with rhodoplasts), and the glaucophytes (with muroplasts).

== Evolution and classification ==
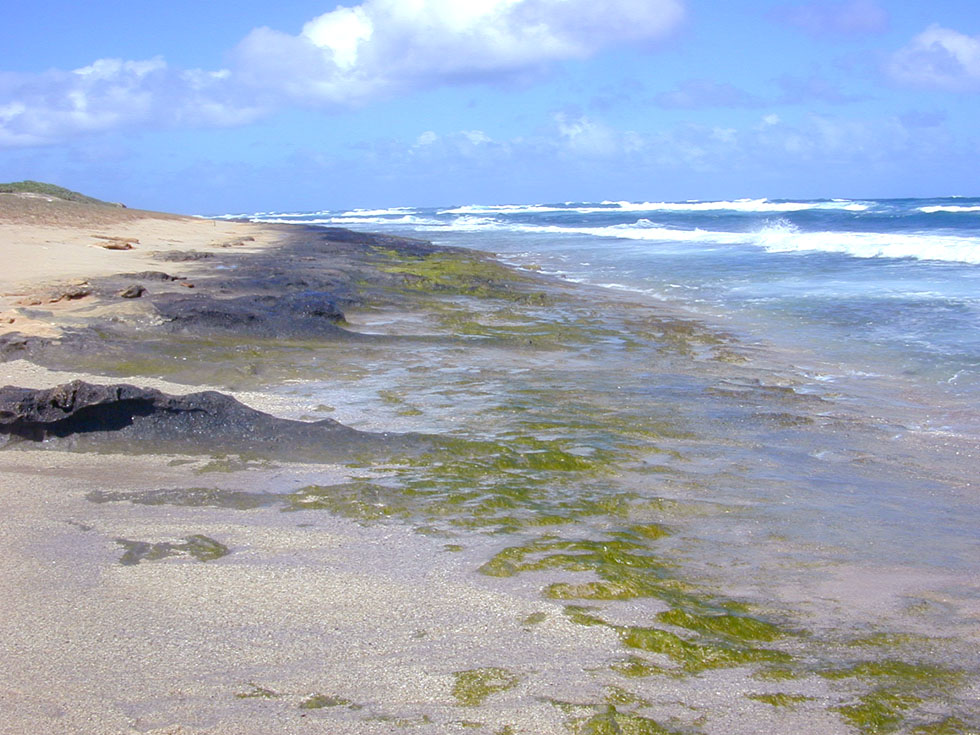
A growth of the green seaweed Ulva on rock substratum at the ocean shore; some green seaweeds like Ulva are quick to utilize inorganic nutrients from land runoff, and thus can be indicators of nutrient pollution

Green algae are often classified with their embryophyte descendants in the green plant clade Viridiplantae (or Chlorobionta). Viridiplantae, together with red algae and glaucophyte algae, form the supergroup Primoplantae, also known as Archaeplastida or Plantae sensu lato. The ancestral green alga was a unicellular flagellate.

The Viridiplantae diverged into two clades. The Chlorophyta include the early diverging prasinophyte lineages and the core Chlorophyta, which contain the majority of described species of green algae. The Streptophyta include charophytes and land plants. Below is a consensus reconstruction of green algal relationships, mainly based on molecular data.

- Viridiplantae
  - Prasinodermophyta
    - Palmophyllophyceae (prasinophyte clade VI)
    - Prasinodermophyceae
  - - Chlorophyta
      - - - - core Chlorophyta
              - Chlorophytina
                - - - Ulvophyceae
                    - Chlorophyceae
                  - Trebouxiophyceae
                - Chlorodendrophyceae
              - Pedinophyceae
            - Prasinophytes Clade VIIA
          - - Prasinophytes Clade VIIC
            - Pycnococcaceae
        - Nephroselmidophyceae
      - - Mamiellophyceae
        - Pyramimonadales
    - Streptophyta/ Charophyta
      - - Mesostigmatophyceae
        - - Spirotaenia
          - Chlorokybophyceae
      - - Streptofilum
        - - Klebsormidiophyceae
          - Phragmoplastophyta
            - Charophyceae
            - - Coleochaetophyceae
              - - - Zygnematophyceae
                  - Mesotaeniaceae s.s.
                - Embryophyta (land plants)

The basal character of the Mesostigmatophyceae, Chlorokybophyceae and spirotaenia are only more conventionally basal Streptophytes.

The algae of this paraphyletic group "Charophyta" were previously included in Chlorophyta, so green algae and Chlorophyta in this definition were synonyms. As the green algae clades get further resolved, the embryophytes, which are a deep charophyte branch, are included in "algae", "green algae" and "Charophytes", or these terms are replaced by cladistic terminology such as Archaeplastida, Plantae/Viridiplantae, and streptophytes, respectively.

== Reproduction ==
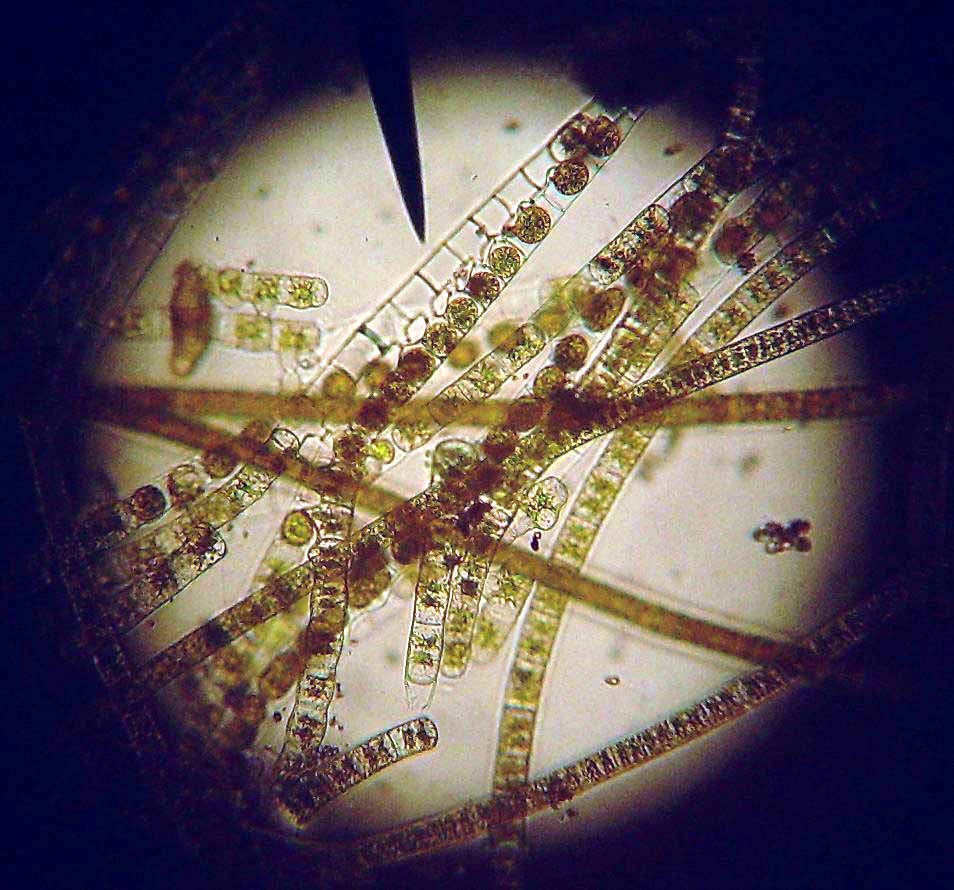
Green algae conjugating

Green algae are a group of photosynthetic, eukaryotic organisms that include species with haplobiontic and diplobiontic life cycles. The diplobiontic species, such as Ulva, follow a reproductive cycle called alternation of generations in which two multicellular forms, haploid and diploid, alternate, and these may or may not be isomorphic (having the same morphology). In haplobiontic species only the haploid generation, the gametophyte is multicellular. The fertilized egg cell, the diploid zygote, undergoes meiosis, giving rise to haploid cells which will become new gametophytes. The diplobiontic forms, which evolved from haplobiontic ancestors, have both a multicellular haploid generation and a multicellular diploid generation. Here the zygote divides repeatedly by mitosis and grows into a multicellular diploid sporophyte. The sporophyte produces haploid spores by meiosis that germinate to produce a multicellular gametophyte. All land plants have a diplobiontic common ancestor, and diplobiontic forms have also evolved independently within Ulvophyceae more than once (as has also occurred in the red and brown algae).

Diplobiontic green algae include isomorphic and heteromorphic forms. In isomorphic algae, the morphology is identical in the haploid and diploid generations. In heteromorphic algae, the morphology and size are different in the gametophyte and sporophyte.

Reproduction varies from fusion of identical cells (isogamy) to fertilization of a large non-motile cell by a smaller motile one (oogamy). However, these traits show some variation, most notably among the basal green algae called prasinophytes.

Haploid algal cells (containing only one copy of their DNA) can fuse with other haploid cells to form diploid zygotes. When filamentous algae do this, they form bridges between cells, and leave empty cell walls behind that can be easily distinguished under the light microscope. This process is called conjugation and occurs for example in Spirogyra.

=== Sex pheromone ===
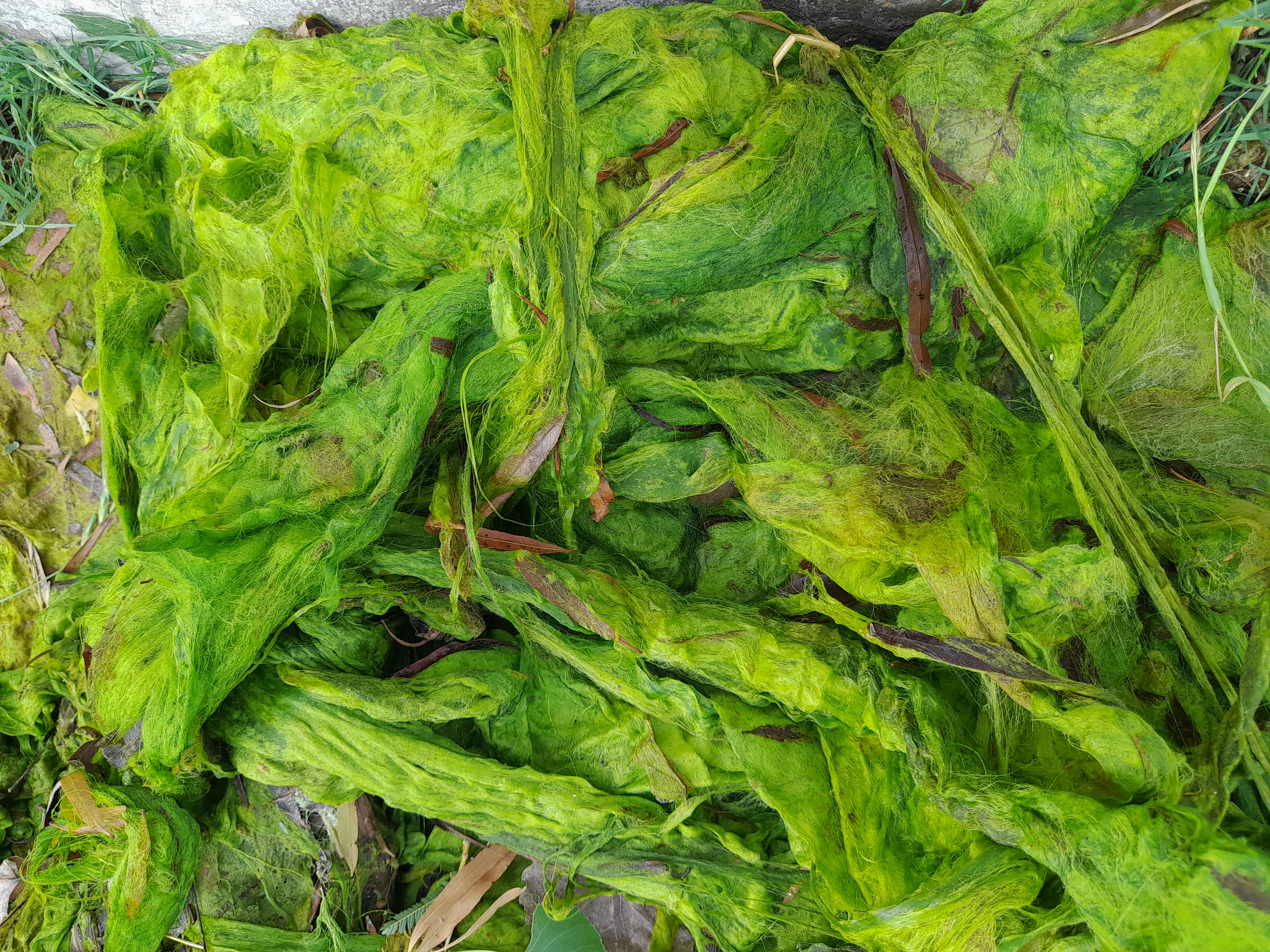
Freshly harvested algae

Sex pheromone production is likely a common feature of green algae, although only studied in detail in a few model organisms. Volvox is a genus of chlorophytes. Different species form spherical colonies of up to 50,000 cells. One well-studied species, Volvox carteri (2,000 – 6,000 cells) occupies temporary pools of water that tend to dry out in the heat of late summer. As their environment dries out, asexual V. carteri quickly die. However, they are able to escape death by switching, shortly before drying is complete, to the sexual phase of their life cycle that leads to production of dormant desiccation-resistant zygotes. Sexual development is initiated by a glycoprotein pheromone (Hallmann et al., 1998). This pheromone is one of the most potent known biological effector molecules. It can trigger sexual development at concentrations as low as 10^{−16}M. Kirk and Kirk showed that sex-inducing pheromone production can be triggered experimentally in somatic cells by heat shock. Thus heat shock may be a condition that ordinarily triggers sex-inducing pheromone in nature.

The Closterium peracerosum-strigosum-littorale (C. psl) complex is a unicellular, isogamous charophycean alga group that is the closest unicellular relative to land plants. Heterothallic strains of different mating type can conjugate to form zygospores. Sex pheromones termed protoplast-release inducing proteins (glycopolypeptides) produced by mating-type (-) and mating-type (+) cells facilitate this process.

== Physiology ==
The green algae, including the characean algae, have served as model experimental organisms to understand the mechanisms of the ionic and water permeability of membranes, osmoregulation, turgor regulation, salt tolerance, cytoplasmic streaming, and the generation of action potentials.
