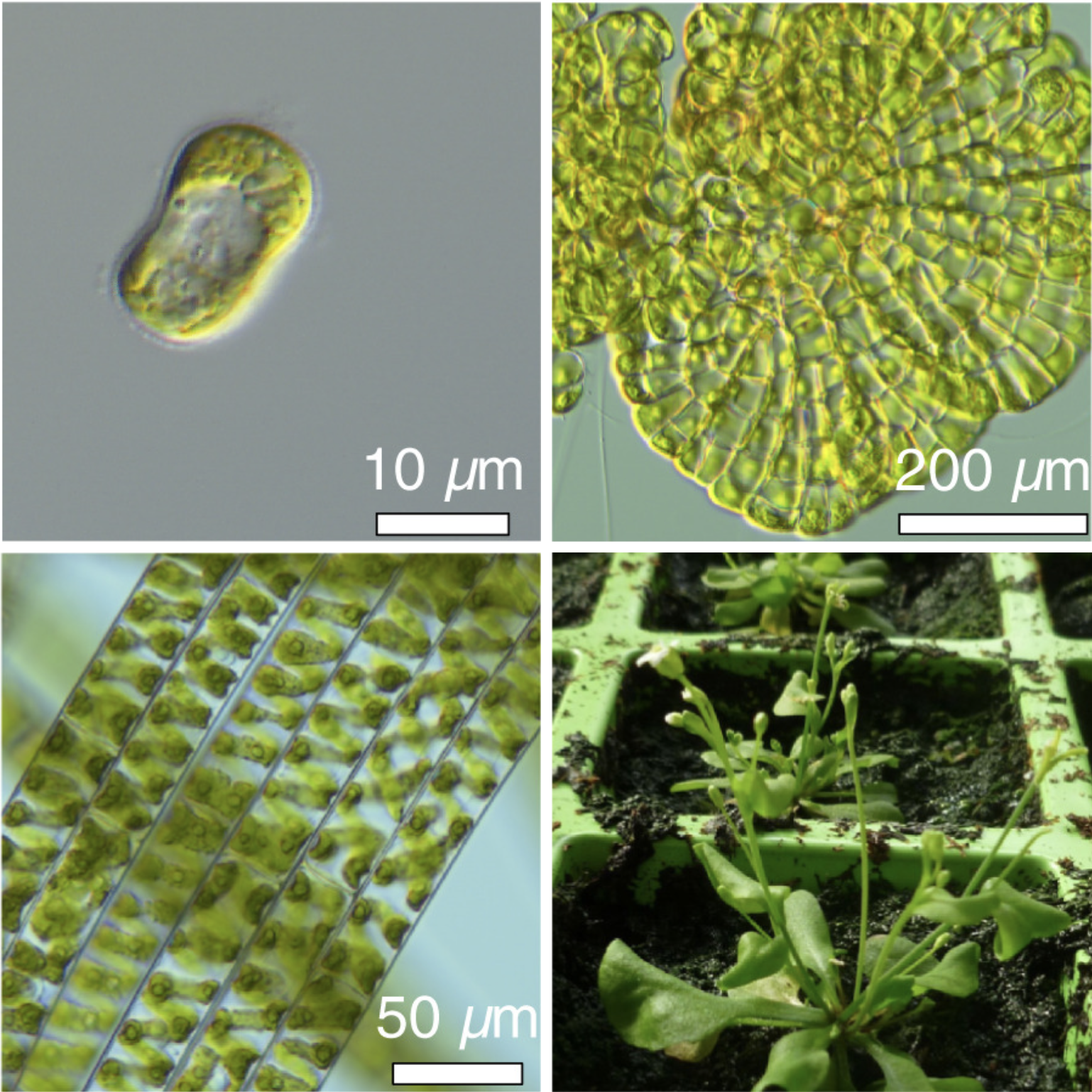
- Diversity of streptophytes

Scientific classification
- Domain: Eukaryota
- Clade: Archaeplastida
- Clade: Viridiplantae
- Clade: Streptophyta; Jeffrey 1967, sensu Leliaert et al. 2012

Subdivisions
- Mesostigmatophyceae; Chlorokybophyceae; Klebsormidiophyceae; Phragmoplastophyta; Charophyceae; Coleochaetophyceae; Zygnematophyceae; Embryophyta

Synonyms
- Anthocerotophyta Sluiman 1985; Charophyta Migula 1897 sensu Lewis & McCourt 2004; Karol et al. 2009; Streptobionta Kenrick & Crane 1997

= Streptophyta =

Clade consisting of the charophyte algae and land plants

Streptophyta (/strɛpˈtɒfɪtə, ˈstrɛptoʊfaɪtə/), informally the streptophytes (/ˈstrɛptəfaɪts/, from the Greek strepto 'twisted', for the morphology of the sperm of some members), is a clade of plants. The composition of the clade varies considerably between authors, but the definition employed here includes land plants and all green algae except the Chlorophyta and the more basal Prasinodermophyta.

== Classifications ==
The composition of Streptophyta and similar groups (Streptophytina, Charophyta) varies in each classification. Some authors include only the Charales and Embryophyta (e.g., Streptophyta, Streptophytina); others include more groups (e.g., Charophyta, Streptophyta, Streptobionta); some authors use this broader definition, but exclude the Embryophyta (e.g., Charophyta, Charophyceae, Streptophycophytes).

The clade Streptophyta includes both unicellular and multicellular organisms. Streptophyta contains the freshwater charophyte green algae and all land plants that reproduce sexually by conjugation. Mesostigma viride, a unicellular green flagellate alga may be a basal Streptophyte.

These earlier classifications have not taken into account that the Coleochaetophyceae and the Zygnemophyceae appear to have emerged in the Charophyceae + Embryophyta clade, resulting in the synonymy of the Phragmoplastophyta and Streptophytina/Streptophyta sensu stricto (a.k.a. Adl et al., 2012) nomenclature.

=== Jeffrey, 1967 ===
- Streptophyta
  - Charales
  - Embryophyta

=== Lewis & McCourt 2004 ===
- Division Charophyta (charophyte algae and embryophytes)
  - Class Mesostigmatophyceae (mesostigmatophytes)
  - Class Chlorokybophyceae (chlorokybophytes)
  - Class Klebsormidiophyceae (klebsormidiophytes)
  - Class Zygnemophyceae (conjugates)
    - Order Zygnematales (filamentous conjugates and saccoderm desmids)
    - Order Desmidiales (placoderm desmids)
  - Class Coleochaetophyceae (coleochaetophytes)
    - Order Coleochaetales
  - Subdivision Streptophytina
    - Class Charophyceae (same as the Smith system, 1938)
      - Order Charales (charophytes sensu stricto)
    - Class Embryophyceae (embryophytes)

=== Leliaert et al. 2012 ===
- Streptophyta
  - charophytes
    - Mesostigmatophyceae
    - Chlorokybophyceae
    - Klebsormidiophyceae
    - Charophyceae
    - Zygnematophyceae
    - Coleochaetophyceae
  - Embryophyta (land plants)

=== Adl et al. 2012 ===
- Archaeplastida Adl et al. 2005
  - Chloroplastida Adl et al. 2005 (Viridiplantae Cavalier-Smith 1981)
    - Chlorophyta Pascher 1914, emend. Lewis & McCourt 2004
    - Charophyta Migula 1897, emend. Karol et al. 2009 (Charophyceae Smith 1938, Mattox & Stewart 1984)
      - Chlorokybus Geitler 1942
      - Mesostigma Lauterborn 1894
      - Klebsormidiophyceae van den Hoek et al. 1995
      - Phragmoplastophyta Lecointre & Guyander 2006
        - Zygnematophyceae van den Hoek et al. 1995, emend. Hall et al. 2009
        - Coleochaetophyceae Jeffrey 1982
        - Streptophyta Jeffrey 1967
          - Charophyceae Smith 1938, emend. Karol et al. 2009 (Charales Lindley 1836; Charophytae Engler 1887)
          - Embryophyta Engler 1886, emend. Lewis & McCourt 2004 (Cormophyta Endlicher 1836; Plantae Haeckel 1866)

=== Adl et al. 2019 ===
- Archaeplastida Adl et al. 2005
  - Chloroplastida Adl et al. 2005 (Viridiplantae Cavalier-Smith 1981)
    - Phylum Streptophyta [Charophyta]
      - Chlorokybus atmophyticus
      - Mesostigma viride
      - Family Klebsormidiophyceae
      - Class Phragmoplastophyta
        - Family Zygnemataceae
        - Order Coleochaetophyceae
        - Family Characeae
        - Kingdom Embryophyta

== Phylogeny ==
Below is a reconstruction of Streptophyta relationships, based on genomic data.

- Streptophyta/ charophyta
  - Mesostigmatophyceae s.l.
    - Mesostigma viride (Mesostigmatophyceae s.s.)
    - - Spirotaenia
      - Chlorokybophyceae
  - - Klebsormidiophyceae
    - Phragmoplastophyta
      - Charophyceae (Stoneworts & musk grasses)
      - - Coleochaetophyceae
        - - Zygnematophyceae (desmids, water silk etc.)
          - Embryophytes
            - Bryophytes
              - Anthocerotophyta (hornworts)
              - Setaphyta
                - Marchantiophyta (Liverworts)
                - Bryophyta (Mosses)
            - Polysporangiomorpha
              - †Horneophytopsida
              - Tracheophyta

Streptofilum, described in 2018, appears to bring in a new branching.

- Streptophyta/ charophyta
  - Mesostigmatophyceae
  - - Chlorokybophyceae
    - - Streptofilum
      - - Klebsormidiophyceae
        - Phragmoplastophyta
          - Charophyceae (Stoneworts & musk grasses)
          - - Zygnematophyceae (desmids, water silk etc.)
            - - Coleochaetophyceae
              - Embryophytes
