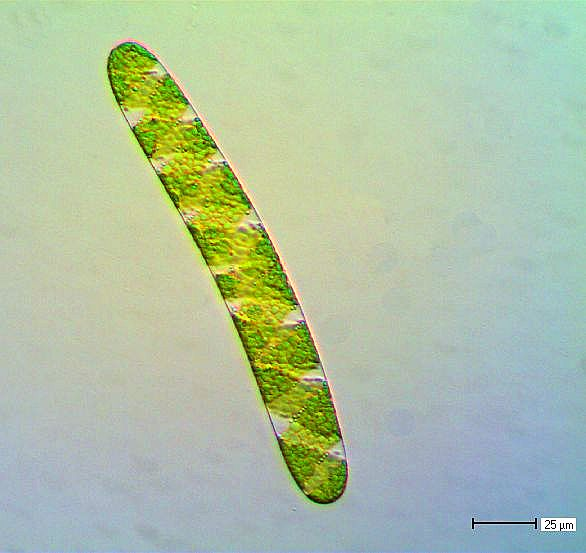
- Spirotaenia condensata

Scientific classification
- Domain: Eukaryota
- Clade: Archaeplastida
- Clade: Viridiplantae
- Clade: Streptophyta
- Genus: Spirotaenia; Brébisson 1848

Type species
- Spirotaenia condensata Brébisson 1848

Synonyms
- Entospira Kuntze 1898; Endospira Brébisson 1850

= Spirotaenia =

Genus of algae

Spirotaenia is a genus of basal unicellular green algae that may be sister to the Chlorokybophyceae. It was previously considered to be part of the Zygnemataceae. It is sexually conjugating, a mode of reproduction that was previously only known in the Zygnemataceae/Mesotaeniaceae, the sister groups to the land plants. This is surprising, as Spirotaenia is much more basal. The conjugating process is substantially aberrant. Spirotaenia may actually be more than one distinct lineage which may not be closely related.

== Phylogeny ==
- Viridiplantae Plantae
  - Prasinodermophyta
    - Palmophyllophyceae (prasinophyte clade VI)
    - Prasinodermophyceae
  - - Chlorophyta
    - Streptophytes
      - - Mesostigmatophyta:
          Mesostigmatophyceae
        - - Chlorokybophyceae
          - Spirotaenia
      - - Klebsormidiophyceae
        - - Charophyceae
          - - Coleochaetophyceae
            - - Zygnematophyceae
              - Embryophytes
