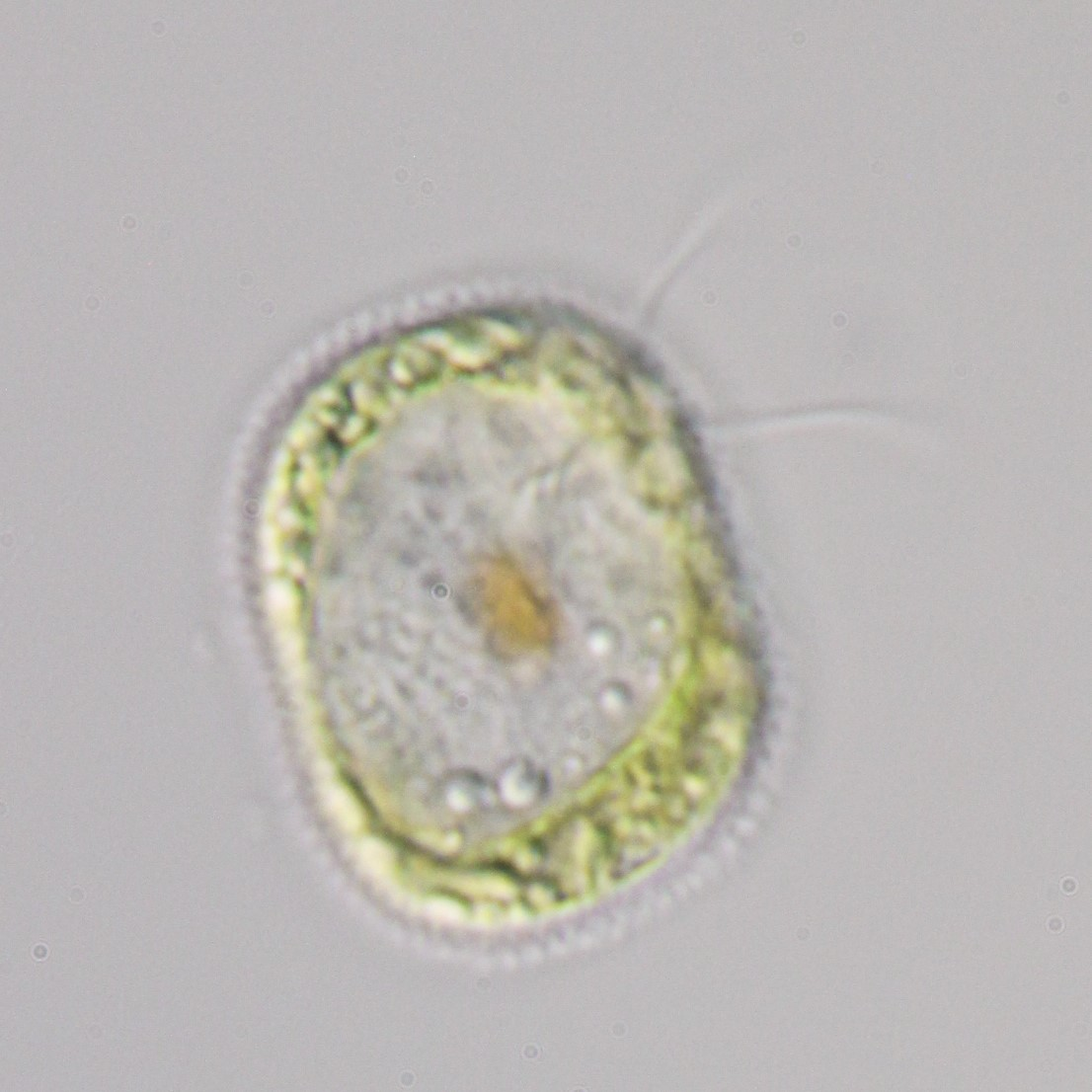
- Mesostigma viride

Scientific classification
- Kingdom: Plantae
- Clade: Streptophyta
- Class: Mesostigmatophyceae; Marin & Melkonian, 1999

= Mesostigmatophyceae =

Single-genus class of basal green algae

The Mesostigmatophyceae are a class of basal green algae found in freshwater. In a narrow circumscription, the class contains a single genus, Mesostigma. AlgaeBase then places the class within its circumscription of Charophyta. A clade containing Chlorokybus and Spirotaenia may either be added, or treated as a sister, with Chlorokybus placed in a separate class, Chlorokybophyceae. When broadly circumscribed, Mesostigmatophyceae may be placed as sister to all other green algae, or as sister to all Streptophyta.
