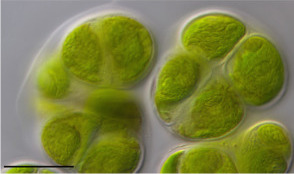
- Chlorokybus atmophyticus

Scientific classification
- Kingdom: Plantae
- Clade: Streptophyta
- Class: Chlorokybophyceae; Irisarri & al.
- Order: Chlorokybales; Irisarri & al.
- Family: Chlorokybaceae; Irisarri & al.
- Genus: Chlorokybus; Geitler

Type species
- Chlorokybus atmophyticus Geitler

Species
- Chlorokybus atmophyticus Geitler; Chlorokybus bremeri Irisarri et al.; Chlorokybus cerffii Irisarri et al.; Chlorokybus melkonianii Irisarri et al.; Chlorokybus riethii Irisarri et al.

= Chlorokybus =

Genus of basal green algae

Chlorokybus is a multicellular (sarcinoid) genus of basal green algae or charophyte. It has been classified as the sole member of the family Chlorokybaceae, which is the sole member of the order Chlorokybales, in turn the sole member of the class Chlorokybophyceae. It grows on soil and rock surfaces, and is rare.

== Description ==
Chlorokybus is a microalga forming sarcinoid, cubical packets of two to eight cells. Each cell contains a single chloroplast which contains a central pyrenoid surrounded by grains of starch, as well as another pyrenoid (called the pseudopyrenoid) near the edge of the chloroplast which lacks starch grains. Mature packets produce a layer of mucilage surrounding the cells.

Chlorokybus reproduces asexually by forming autospores. The autospores can also differentiate into zoospores, which have two flagella. Zoospores can form groups of up to 32 cells. Zoospores swim to a new location and then settle, retracting their flagella and creating a new vegetative cell.

== Taxonomy ==
Chlorokybus atmophyticus was once thought to be the only species in the genus. In 2021, a study showed that there were at least four other species, morphologically indistinguishable, but with deep genomic differences, suggesting divergences possibly about 76 million years ago. Chlorokybus has been found in Eurasia, Central and South America.

Chlorokybus was placed in a new class, order and family. The new class Chlorokybophyceae was basal within the charophytes.

- - - Mesostigmatophyceae
    - - Spirotaenia
      - Chlorokybophyceae
  - - Klebsormidiophyceae
    - - Charophyceae
      - - Coleochaetophyceae
        - - Zygnematophyceae
          - Embryophyta

Within the genus, the species were related as shown in the cladogram:

- Chlorokybus
  - C. cerffii
  - - C. riethii
    - - C. bremeri
      - - C. atmophyticus
        - C. melkonianii
