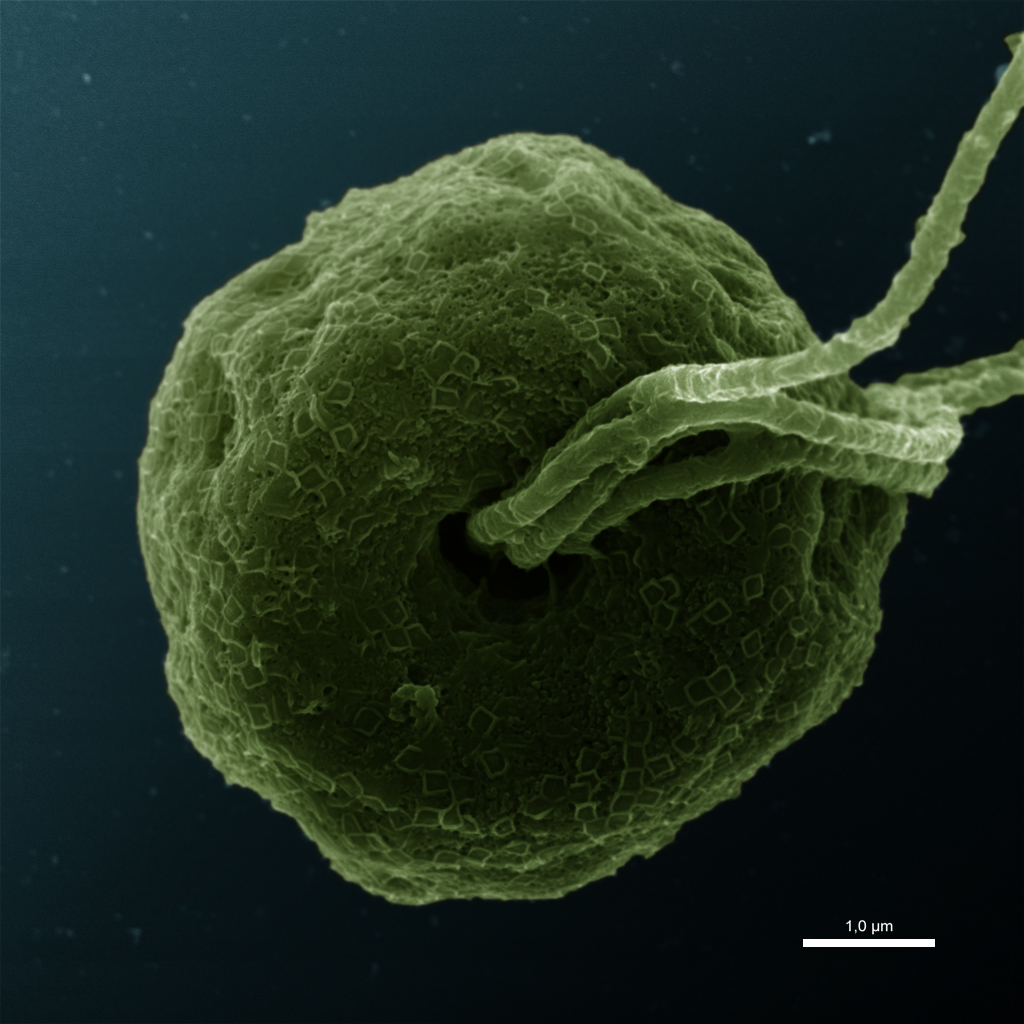
- Pyramimonas sp.

Scientific classification
- Kingdom: Plantae
- Division: Chlorophyta
- Informal group: Prasinophyte

Included classes
- Palmophyllophyceae (=Prasinophyceae s.s.); Prasinodermophyta; Pyramimonadophyceae; Mamiellophyceae; Nephroselmidophyceae (=Nephrophyceae); Chloropicophyceae; Pseudoscourfieldiophyceae; Picocystophyceae; Chlorodendrophyceae

Excluded classes (i.e. chlorophytes not considered prasinophytes)
- Pedinophyceae; Ulvophyceae; Trebouxiophyceae; Chlorophyceae

= Prasinophyte =

Prasinophyte Paraphyletic group of chlorophytes

Class of algae

The prasinophytes are a group of unicellular green algae. Prasinophytes mainly include marine planktonic species, as well as some freshwater representatives. The prasinophytes are morphologically diverse, including flagellates with one to eight flagella and non-motile (coccoid) unicells, as well as dormant or cyst stage phycoma. The cells of many species are covered with organic body scales; others are naked. Well studied genera include Ostreococcus, considered to be the smallest (ca. 0.95 μm) free-living eukaryote, and Micromonas, both of which are found in marine waters worldwide. Prasinophytes have simple cellular structures, containing a single chloroplast and a single mitochondrion. The genomes are relatively small compared to other eukaryotes (about 12 Mbp for Ostreococcus and 21 Mbp for Micromonas). At least one species, the Antarctic form Pyramimonas gelidicola, is capable of phagocytosis and is therefore a mixotrophic algae.

Some authors treat the prasinophytes as a polyphyletic grouping of green algae from different clades. As the Tetraphytina emerged in the Prasinophytes, recently authors include it, rendering it monophyletic, and equivalent to chlorophyta.

== Morphology ==
Representation of a Prasinophyte: 1. Flagellum; 2. Flagellar hairs; 3. Flagellar scales; 4. Pit, for communication or fluid exchange; 5. Contractile vacuole, regulates the quantity of water inside a cell; 6. Vacuole; 7. Basal body; 8. Rhizoplast, a striated, fibrous root; 9. Golgi apparatus, modifies proteins and sends them out of the cell; 10. Endoplasmic reticulum, the transport network for molecules going to specific parts of the cell; 11. Endosome, sorts material; 12. Nucleolus; 13. Nucleus; 14. Eyespot, photoreceptor used to sense light direction and intensity; 15. Plastid membranes (2, primary); 16. Pyrenoid, center of carbon fixation; 17. Starch granule; 18. Cytoplasmic channel; 19. Thylakoids, site of the light-dependent reactions of photosynthesis; 20. Glycoprotein theca; 21. Mitochondrion, creates ATP (energy) for the cell (flat cristae)

== Ecology ==
A study of photosynthetic gene-sequence diversity (rbcL) in the Gulf of Mexico indicated that Prasinophytes are particularly prevalent at the Subsurface Chlorophyll Maximum (SCM) and several different ecotypes of Ostreococcus have been detected in the environment. These ecotypes were thought to be distinguished in the environment by their adaptation to light intensities. O. lucimarinus was isolated from a high-light environment and observed year-round in the coastal North Pacific Ocean. RCC141 was considered low-light, because it was isolated from the lower euphotic zone. These strains, or ecotypes, were later shown to live in different habitats (open-ocean or mesotrophic) and their distributions do not appear to be connected to light availability. O. tauri was isolated from a coastal lagoon and appears to be light-polyvalent. Genetic data indicates that distinct molecular differences exist between the different ecotypes that have been detected.

Prasinophytes are subject to infection by large double-stranded DNA viruses belonging to the genus Prasinovirus in the family Phycodnaviridae, as well as a Reovirus. It has been estimated that from 2 to 10% of the Micromonas pusilla population is lysed per day by viruses.

== Phylogeny ==
Recent studies agree that the prasinophytes are not a natural group, being highly paraphyletic. Relationships among the groups making up the Chlorophyta are not fully resolved. The cladogram produced by Leliaert et al. 2011 and some modification according to Silar 2016, Leliaert 2016 and Lopes dos Santos et al. 2017 is shown below. The blue shaded groups are or have traditionally been placed in the Prasinophyceae). The species Mesostigma viride has been shown to be a member of a basal clade inside Streptophyta. The others are members of the Chlorophyta.

- Green Algae
  - Chlorophyta/ Prasinophyta
    - Palmophyllophyceae
      - Prasinococcales ("prasinophyte clade VI")
      - Palmophyllales
    - - - Pyramimonadophyceae ("prasinophyte clade I")
        - Mamiellophyceae ("prasinophyte clade II")
          - Monomastigales
          - - Dolichomastigales
            - Mamiellales
      - - Nephroselmidophyceae
          Nephroselmidales ("prasinophyte clade III")
        - - ?Pycnococcaceae ("prasinophyte clade V")
          - Picocystophyceae ("prasinophyte clade VII C")
          - - Chloropicophyceae ("prasinophyte clade VII A/B")
            - Tetraphytina
              - Pedinophyceae
              - Chlorophytina
                - Chlorodendrophyceae ("prasinophyte clade IV")
                - - Trebouxiophyceae
                  - - Ulvophyceae
                    - Chlorophyceae
  - Streptophyta
    - - Chlorokybophyceae
      - Mesostigmatophyceae
    - - Klebsormidiophyceae
      - - Charophyceae
        - - Zygnematophyceae
          - Coleochaetophyceae
          - Land plants

A 2020 study placed the Palmophyllophyceae (prasinophyte clade VI) in a new phylum outside of the Chlorophyta and Streptophyta, the Prasinodermophyta, as shown below. However, a subsequent genomic study recovered Prasinodermophyta as sister to the revised Chlorophyta and questioned the need for the third division or phylum.

- Viridiplantae
  - Prasinodermophyta
    - Prasinodermophyceae
    - Palmophyllophyceae
  - - Chlorophyta
    - Streptophyta

== See also ==
- Smallest organisms
