= Chloropicon sieburthii =

Scientific classification
- Domain: Eukaryota
- Supergroup: Archaeplastida
- Clade: Viridiplantae
- Division: Chlorophyta
- Class: Chloropicophyceae
- Order: Chloropicales
- Family: Chloropicaceae
- Genus: Chloropicon
- Species: C. sieburthii

Binomial name
- Chloropicon sieburthii Lopes dos Santos & Eikrem, 2017

Species of algae

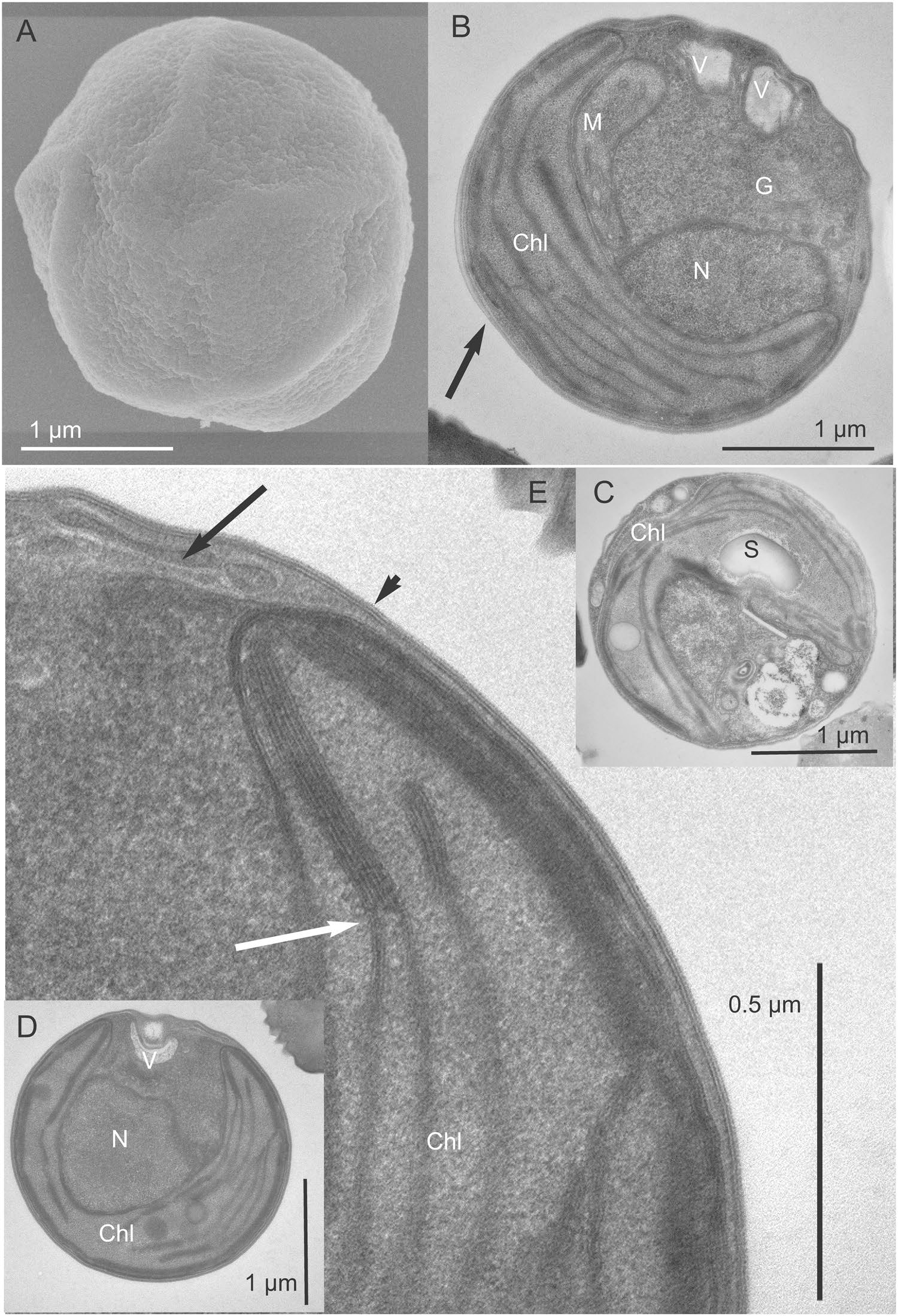
Holotype of Chloropicon sieburthii cells embedded in resin block deposited at the Natural History Museum, University of Oslo

Chloropicon sieburthii is a species of marine chlorophyte algae, and is the type species of Chloropicon.

== Discovery ==
Chloropicon sieburthii was described in 2017, alongside a number of closely related Chloropicon species and Chloroparvula species. It was discovered in the equatorial Pacific Ocean at a depth of 120 meters. It was named in honor of John Sieburth for his work on electron microscopy of marine picoeukaryotes.

== Description ==
Chloropicon sieburthii is unicellular, with a slightly irregular coccoid shape, a smooth cell surface, and a diameter ranging between 2–4 μm. Cells contain one mitochondria and one crescent-shaped chloroplast. No flagellum is present. Thylakoids have been seen alone or in stacks of three.

== Ecology ==
Chloropicon sieburthii has been recorded as a prey species of the Northern Pacific seastar. In addition to its discovery in the open ocean, it has been observed in kelp forests off the coast of California, in the Chumash Heritage National Marine Sanctuary.

== Phylogeny ==
Chloropicon sieburthii is believed to be most closely related to Chloropicon roscoffensis and Chloropicon primus based on similarities of their genomes, plastomes, and mitogenomes.
