= Marsupiomonas =

Scientific classification
- Kingdom: Plantae
- Division: Chlorophyta
- Class: Pedinophyceae
- Order: Marsupiomonadales
- Family: Marsupiomonadaceae
- Genus: Marsupiomonas; Marin
- Species: M. pelliculata

Binomial name
- Marsupiomonas pelliculata H.L.J.Jones, Leadbeater & J.C.Green

Genus of algae

Marsupiomonas is a genus of green algae, containing a single species Marsupiomonas pelliculata.

Marsupiomonas pelliculata is a single-celled organism with one emergent flagellum. Cells are rounded and flattened, with the flagellum emerging out of a pit along the edge. When stationary, the flagellum curves around the cell body, when moving, the flagellum trails behind the cell. The flagellum is covered in stiff hairs. In addition to the flagellum, there is an additional basal body. The cell is partially surrounded by a theca. One chloroplast is present, with a single pyrenoid. On the side of the cell opposite the flagellum, there is a single eyespot. Golgi bodies, mitochondria, and the nucleus are situated between the chloroplast and the basal bodies.

Marsupiomonas was first isolated from a salt marsh in the Tamar Estuary, Cornwall, England, and can tolerate a wide range of salinities.
