= Pycnococcus =

Scientific classification
- Kingdom: Plantae
- Division: Chlorophyta
- Class: Pseudoscourfieldiophyceae
- Order: Pseudoscourfieldiales
- Family: Pycnococcaceae
- Genus: Pycnococcus; R.R.L.Guillard

Species
- Pycnococcus guillardii; Pycnococcus provasolii

Genus of algae

Pycnococcus is a genus of green algae in the family Pycnococcaceae. It contains the species Pycnococcus provasolii. This spieces is the type species (holotype) of the genus Pycnococcus.
