= Pseudoscourfieldia =

Scientific classification
- Kingdom: Plantae
- Division: Chlorophyta
- Class: Pyramimonadophyceae
- Order: Pseudoscourfieldiales
- Family: Pycnococcaceae
- Genus: Pseudoscourfieldia; I.Manton

Genus of algae

Pseudoscourfieldia is a genus of green algae in the family Pycnococcaceae.

The genus name of Scourfieldia is in honour of David Joseph Scourfield FLS FRMS ISO (1866–1949), who was a British civil servant and biologist known as an authority on the Cladocera.

== Species ==
- Pseudoscourfieldia marina (J.Throndsen) Manton, 1975

Also Pseudoscourfieldia longifilis (Butcher) R.E.Norris, 1980 now accepted as Nephroselmis pyriformis (N.Carter) Ettl, 1982
