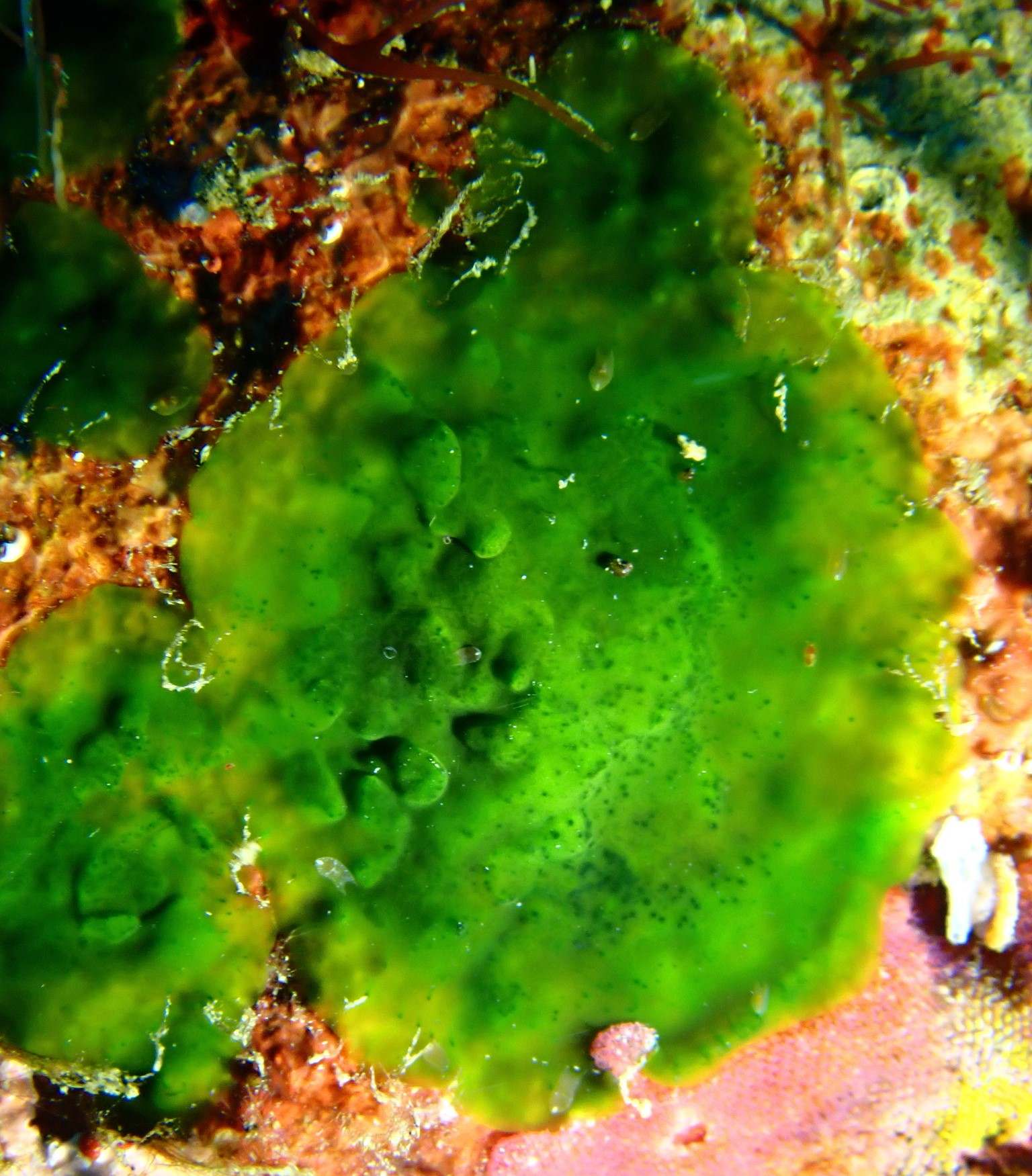

Scientific classification
- Domain: Eukaryota
- Clade: Archaeplastida
- Clade: Viridiplantae
- Division: Prasinodermophyta
- Class: Palmophyllophyceae
- Order: Palmophyllales
- Family: Palmophyllaceae
- Genus: Palmophyllum
- Species: P. umbracola

Binomial name
- Palmophyllum umbracola W.A.Nelson & K.G.Ryan, 1986

= Palmophyllum umbracola =

Species of alga

Palmophyllum umbracola is a species of algae. It is found in New Zealand waters particularly the Kermadec and Three Kings Islands, the northeastern part of the North Island of New Zealand, and the West coast of North America.

Palmophyllum umbracola grows in the form of thalli attached to substrates such as rocks and algae. The thalli are formed from spherical green cells in a gelatinous matrix. Its habitat is subtidal on rock in shallow waters extending to more than 70 meters deep.

The holotype is held at the Museum of New Zealand Te Papa Tongarewa.
