= Pedinomonadaceae =

Scientific classification
- Kingdom: Plantae
- Division: Chlorophyta
- Class: Pedinophyceae
- Order: Pedinomonadales; Moestrup
- Family: Pedinomonadaceae; Korshikov

Genera
- Anisomonas; Chlorochytridion; Dioriticamonas; Pedinomonas; Resultor

Family of algae

Pedinomonadaceae is a family of green algae. They are small (less than 3 μm) single-celled algae. Each cell has a single flagellum. Molecular data has provided evidence for an independent class Pedinophyceae (including the Pedinomonadaceae), sister to all phycoplast-containing core Chlorophyta (Chlorodendrophyceae, Trebouxiophyceae, Ulvophyceae and Chlorophyceae).
