= Resultomonadaceae =

Scientific classification
- Domain: Eukaryota
- Clade: Archaeplastida
- Clade: Viridiplantae
- Division: Chlorophyta
- Class: Pedinophyceae
- Order: Marsupiomonadales
- Family: Resultomonadaceae; Marin

Genera
- Akinorimonas; Oistococcus; Resultomonas

Family of algae

Resultomonadaceae is a family of green algae in the class Pedinophyceae.
