= Pedinomonas =

Scientific classification
- Kingdom: Plantae
- Division: Chlorophyta
- Class: Pedinophyceae
- Order: Pedinomonadales
- Family: Pedinomonadaceae
- Genus: Pedinomonas; Korshikov

Species
- Pedinomonas minor; Pedinomonas tuberculata

Synonyms
- Pedinomonas Korshikov 1923

Genus of algae

Pedinomonas is a genus of green algae in the family Pedinomonadaceae.

The genus has also had species classified in Micromonas.

== Species of Pedinomonas ==
- Pedinomonas minor
- Pedinomonas tuberculata
