= Marsupiomonadaceae =

Scientific classification
- Clade: Viridiplantae
- Division: Chlorophyta
- Class: Pedinophyceae
- Order: Marsupiomonadales
- Family: Marsupiomonadaceae; Marin

Genera
- Marsupiomonas; Protoeuglena

Family of algae

Marsupiomonadaceae is a family of green algae in the class Pedinophyceae.
