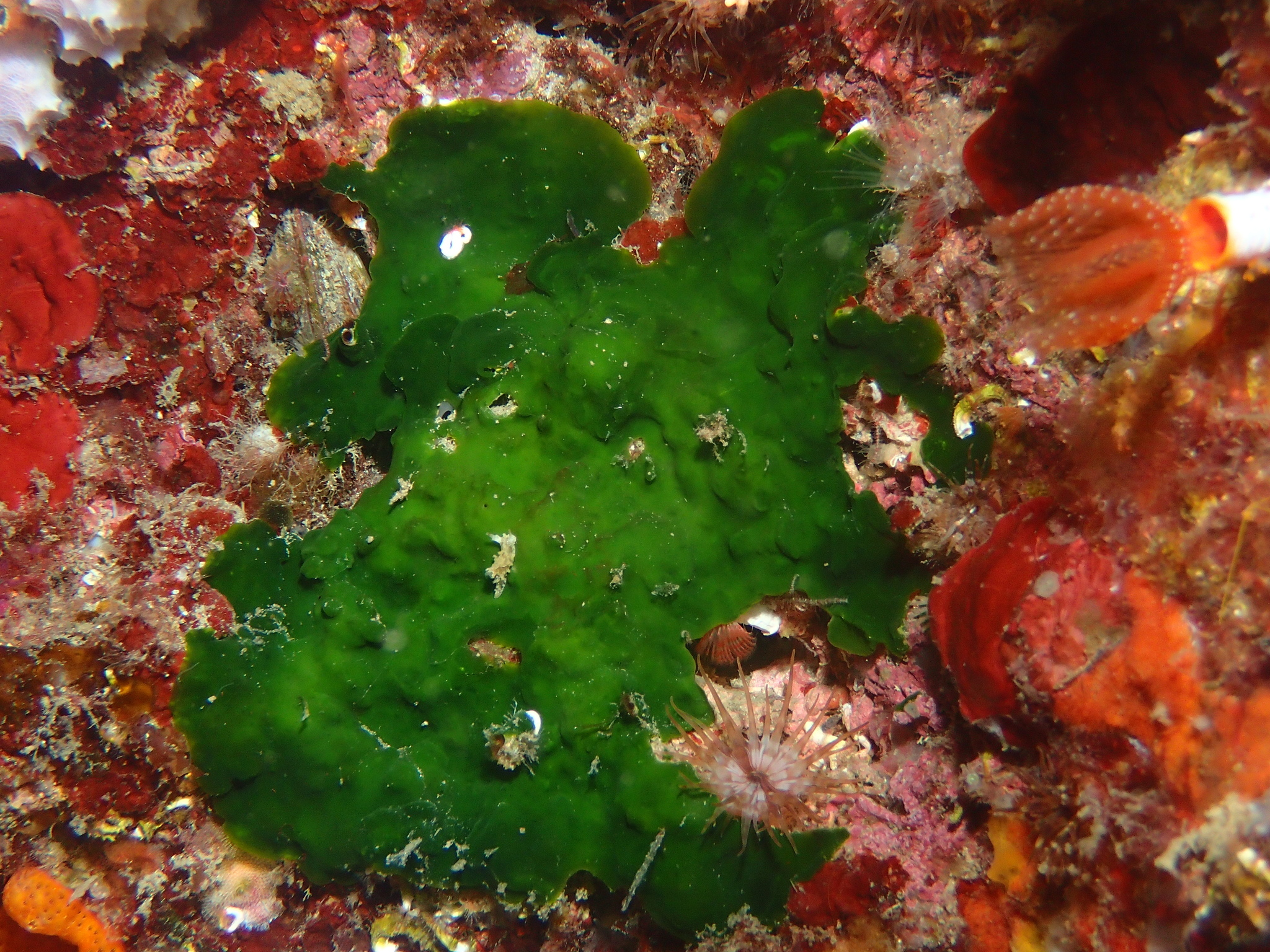

Scientific classification
- Domain: Eukaryota
- Clade: Archaeplastida
- Clade: Viridiplantae
- Division: Prasinodermophyta
- Class: Palmophyllophyceae
- Order: Palmophyllales
- Family: Palmophyllaceae
- Genus: Palmophyllum
- Species: P. crassum

Binomial name
- Palmophyllum crassum (Naccari 1828) Rabenhorst 1868

Synonyms
- Palmella crassa Naccari, 1828; Chlorochytrium crassum(Naccari, 1828) Rabenhorst; Palmophyllum flabellatum Kützing 1845; Palmophyllum gestroi Piccone 1879; Palmophyllum orbiculare Bornet ex Ardissone 1887; Palmophyllum crassum var. orbiculare (Bornet ex Ardissone 1887) Feldmann 1937; Palmophyllum crassum var. typicum Feldmann 1937; Palmophyllum crassum f. gestroi (Piccone 1879) Giaccone 1965

= Palmophyllum crassum =

Species of alga

Palmophyllum crassum is a species of algae. It has a cosmopolitan distribution in deep seawater habitats. It grows in the subtidal zone of oceans, between 8 to 30 m in depth.

Palmophyllum crassum grows in the form of thalli attached to substrates such as rocks and algae. The thallus is up to 25 cm wide, bright to dark green. The thallus is formed from spherical green cells embedded in a gelatinous matrix, with cells more densely embedded near the surface.
