= Resultomonas =

Scientific classification
- Domain: Eukaryota
- Supergroup: Archaeplastida
- Clade: Viridiplantae
- Division: Chlorophyta
- Class: Pedinophyceae
- Order: Marsupiomonadales
- Family: Resultomonadaceae
- Genus: Resultomonas; B.Marin
- Species: R. moestrupii

Binomial name
- Resultomonas moestrupii B.Marin

Genus of algae

Resultomonas is a genus of green algae, containing the single species Resultomonas moestrupii.
