= Sieburth =

Sieburth is a surname. Notable people with the surname include:

- Richard Sieburth (born 1949), American translator
- John Sieburth (1927–2006), Canadian biologist
- Scott Sieburth, American chemist, son of John
