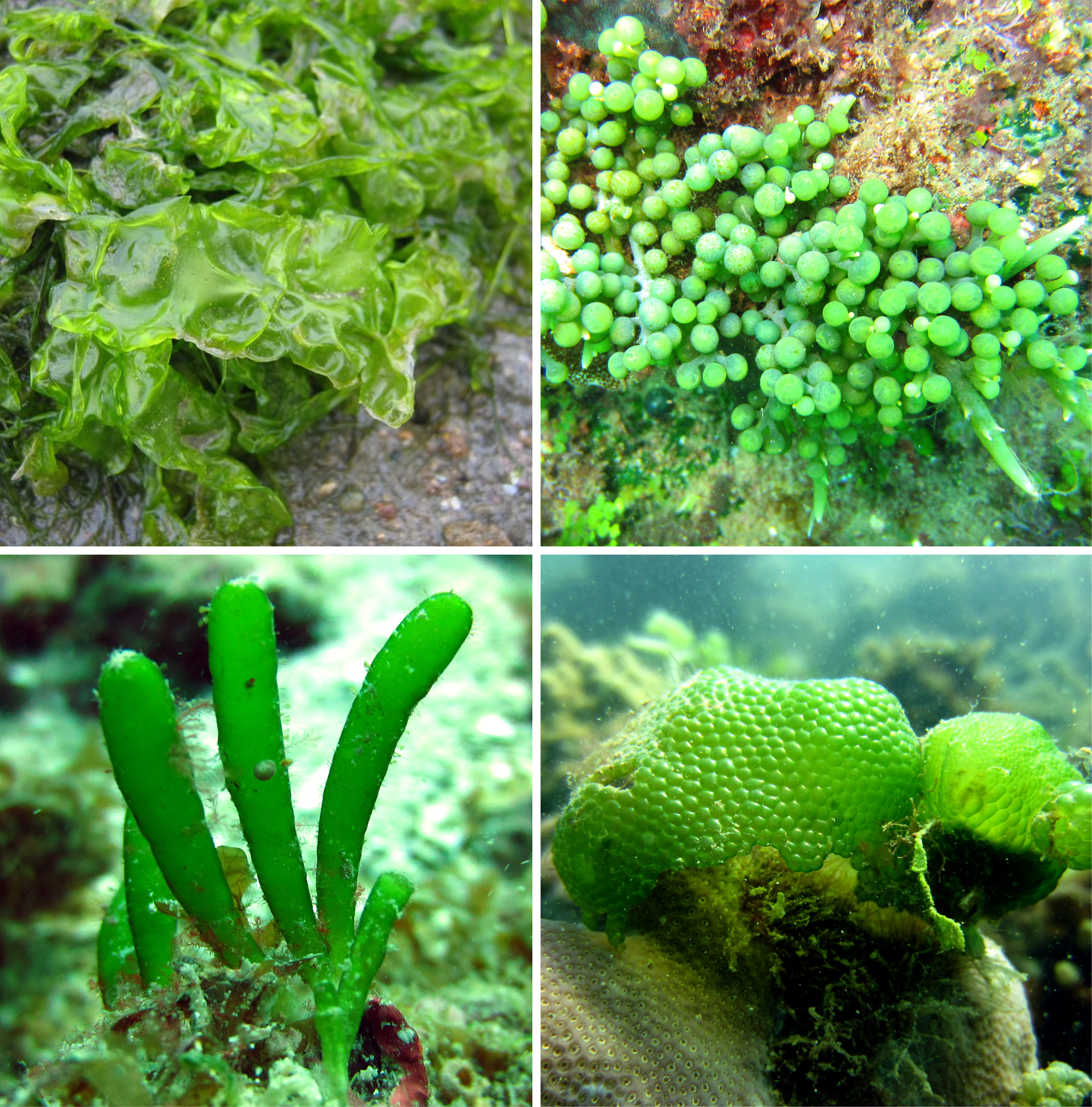
- Composite image to illustrate the diversity of Chlorophytina. Top left: Ulva. Top right: Caulerpa. Bottom left: Bornetella. Bottom right: Dictyosphaeria.

Scientific classification
- Kingdom: Plantae
- Division: Chlorophyta
- Subdivision: Chlorophytina

Classes
- Chlorodendrophyceae Massjuk 2006; Chlorophyceae Wille; Trebouxiophyceae Friedl 1995; Ulvophyceae K.R.Mattox & K.D.Stewart 1984; Pedinophyceae

= Chlorophytina =

Clade of algae

Chlorophytina is a subphylum within Chlorophyta and includes five classes. It contains the more well-known green algae and is characterized by the presence of phycoplasts.

== Taxonomy ==
Below is a consensus reconstruction of green algal relationships, mainly based on molecular data. Molecular phylogenies do not always agree on the position of species within Pedinophyceae.

- Viridiplantae (green algae and land plants)
  - - - Chlorophyta
        - - - - - Chlorophytina
                  - - - - Ulvophyceae Mattox & Stewart 1984
                        - Chlorophyceae Christensen 1994
                      - Trebouxiophyceae Friedl 1995
                    - Chlorodendrophyceae Massjuk 2006
                  - Pedinophyceae Moestrup 1991
                - Chloropicophyceae
              - - Picocystis
                - Pycnococcaceae
            - Nephroselmidophyceae
          - - Mamiellophyceae Marin & Melkonian 2010
            - Pyramimonadales
      - Streptophyta = Charophyta (incl. Embryophyta)
  - Prasinodermophyta
