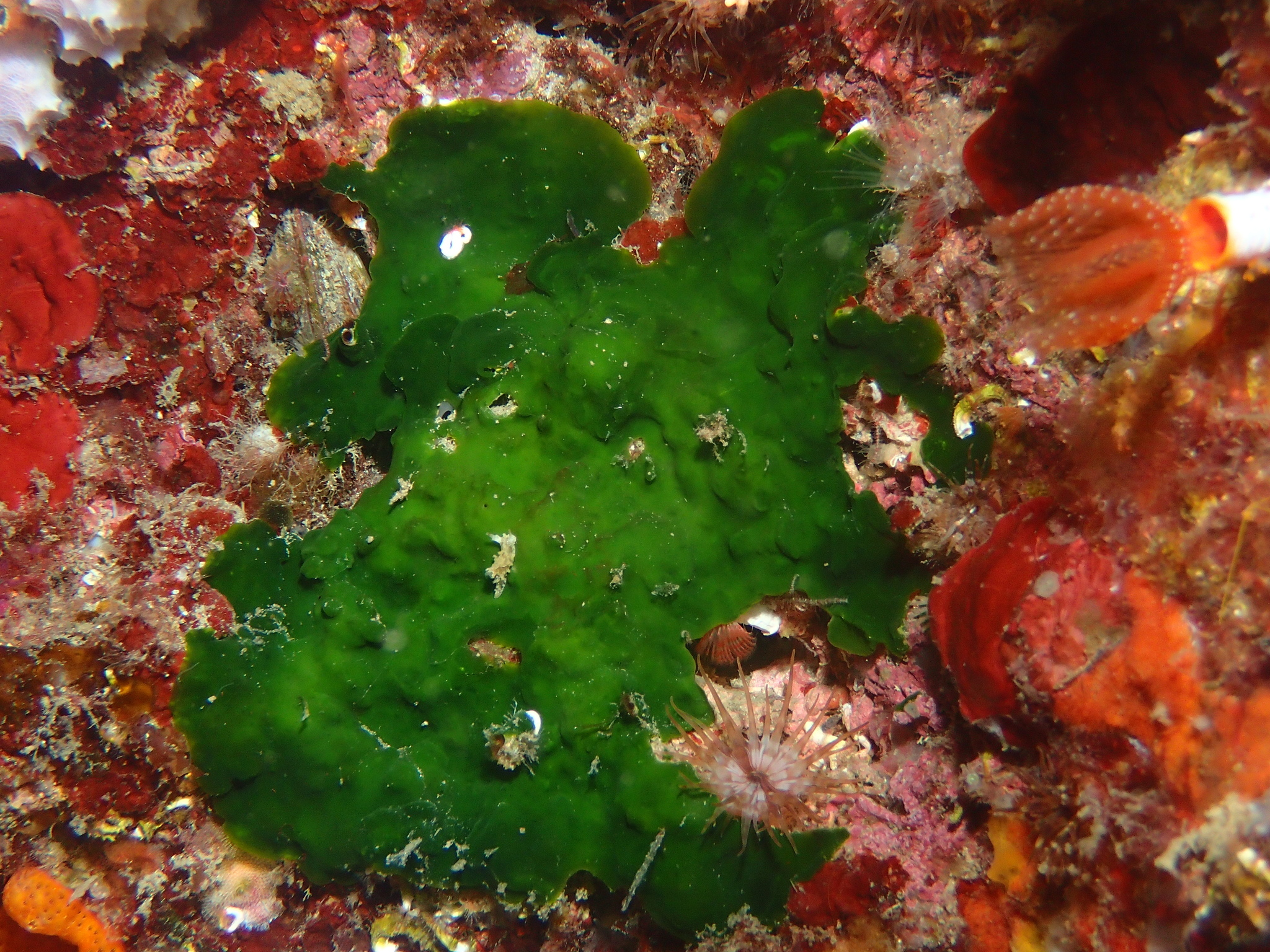
- Palmophyllum crassum

Scientific classification
- Domain: Eukaryota
- Clade: Archaeplastida
- Clade: Viridiplantae
- Division: Prasinodermophyta
- Class: Palmophyllophyceae
- Order: Palmophyllales
- Family: Palmophyllaceae
- Genus: Palmophyllum; Kutzing, 1847

Type species
- Palmophyllum flabellatum Kützing

= Palmophyllum =

Genus of algae

Palmophyllum is a genus of alga. This genus is known to grow in low light conditions and at depth. The known distribution of this genus is being extended as deeper waters are explored.

Palmophyllum grows on substrates such as corals and rocks.

The thalli of Palmophyllum are green or olivaceous, consisting of thousands of cells embedded in a mucilaginous matrix growing up to 50 cm wide and 1-3 mm thick. Cells are dispersed throughout the matrix, more numerous near the margin, and often in groups of two or four. Some species have conspicuous striations or fibrous structures within the mucilaginous matrix. Cells are spherical, 5 to 15 μm in diameter, with thin cell walls. The cell is uninuclate (with one nucleus) and contains a parietal cup-shaped chloroplast with no pyrenoid or stigma.

== Species ==
- Palmophyllum crassum (Naccari 1828) Rabenhorst 1868
- Palmophyllum foliaceum West 1907
- Palmophyllum umbracola Nelson & Ryan 1986
