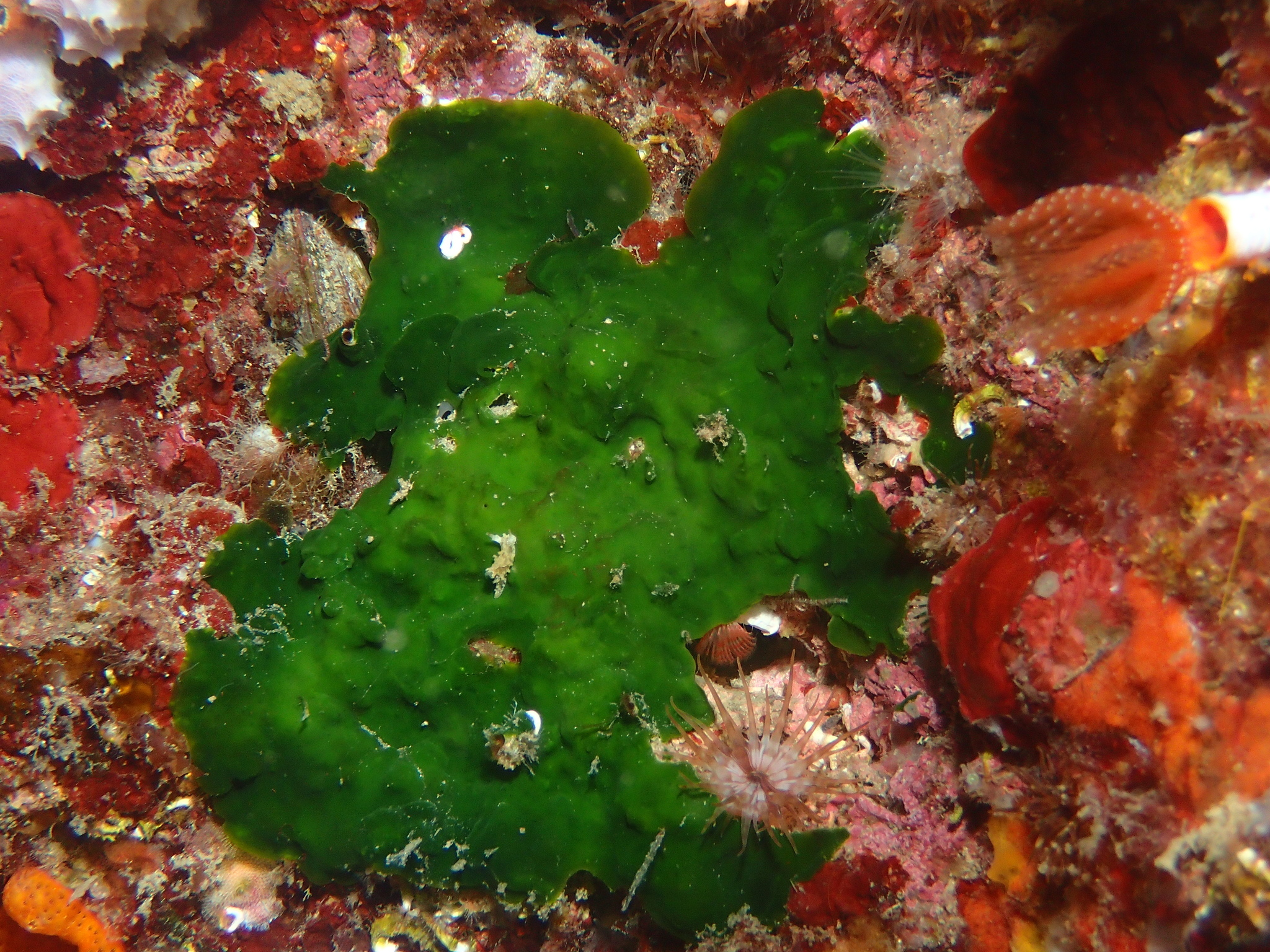
- Palmophyllum crassum

Scientific classification
- Domain: Eukaryota
- Clade: Archaeplastida
- Clade: Viridiplantae
- Division: Prasinodermophyta
- Class: Palmophyllophyceae; Leliaert et al. 2016

Orders
- Palmophyllales Zechman et al. 2010; Prasinococcales Guillou et al.

Synonyms
- Prasinophyceae Christensen 1962

= Palmophyllophyceae =

Clade of algae

The Palmophyllophyceae are a class of green algae consisting of the Palmophyllales and Prasinococcales.

Palmophyllophyceae consists of planktonic, single cells or colonies of cells, or cells embedded in a gelatinous, macroscopic matrix. Cells are spherical or subspherical, surrounded by a cell wall. The cell contains a single cup-shaped chloroplast enclosing a mitochondrion, nucleus, and large Golgi body. The chloroplast has two membranes and may have a pyrenoid. The chloroplast contains chlorophyll a and b.

It belongs to Prasinodermophyta, a group that – according to Li et al.'s phylogenetic analyses – is basal to the rest of the Viridiplantae (that is, the group of all green algae, from which land plants evolved, also known as "green plants").

- Viridiplantae
  - Prasinodermophyta
    - Prasinodermophyceae
    - Palmophyllophyceae
      - Palmophyllales
      - Prasinococcales
  - - Chlorophyta
      - - - - - core Chlorophyta
                - Chlorophytina
                  - - - Ulvophyceae
                      - Chlorophyceae
                    - Trebouxiophyceae
                  - Chlorodendrophyceae
                - Pedinophyceae
              - Prasinophytes Clade VIIA
            - - Prasinophytes Clade VIIC
              - Pycnococcaceae
          - Nephroselmidophyceae
        - - Mamiellophyceae
          - Pyramimonadales
    - Streptophyta
      - - Mesostigmatophyceae
        - Chlorokybophyceae
      - 'filamentous' Streptophyta
        - Klebsormidiophyceae
        - phragmoplastophyta
          - Charophyceae
          - - - Zygnematophyceae
              - Embryophytes (land plants)
            - Coleochaetophyceae
