= D. J. Scourfield =

British biologist and carcinologist

David Joseph Scourfield ISO FLS FRMS (October 20, 1866 – October 3, 1949) was a British civil servant and biologist known as an authority on the Cladocera. He served as president of the Quekett Microscopical Club and vice president of the Royal Microscopical Society. Born in Bow, London, he was hired by the Royal Mint at age 20 and worked there until his retirement in 1926, when he was awarded the Imperial Service Order for his services. His scientific career primarily took place after retirement from civil service, publishing on fossil and living freshwater crustaceans. He died at his home in Leytonstone at the age of 83.

He has been honoured in the names of two types of marine taxa, in 1912, botanist George Stephen West published Scourfieldia, which is a genus of green algae in the family Scourfieldiaceae. Then in 1975, I.Manton published Pseudoscourfieldia (in the Pycnococcaceae family).
