= Hiemalomonas =

Scientific classification
- Kingdom: Plantae
- Division: Chlorophyta
- Class: Nephrophyceae
- Order: Nephroselmidales
- Family: Nephroselmidaceae
- Genus: Hiemalomonas; B. V. Skvortzov, 1971

Genus of algae

Heimalomonas is a genus of green algae. Heimalomonas belongs to the Nephroselmidaceae family.
