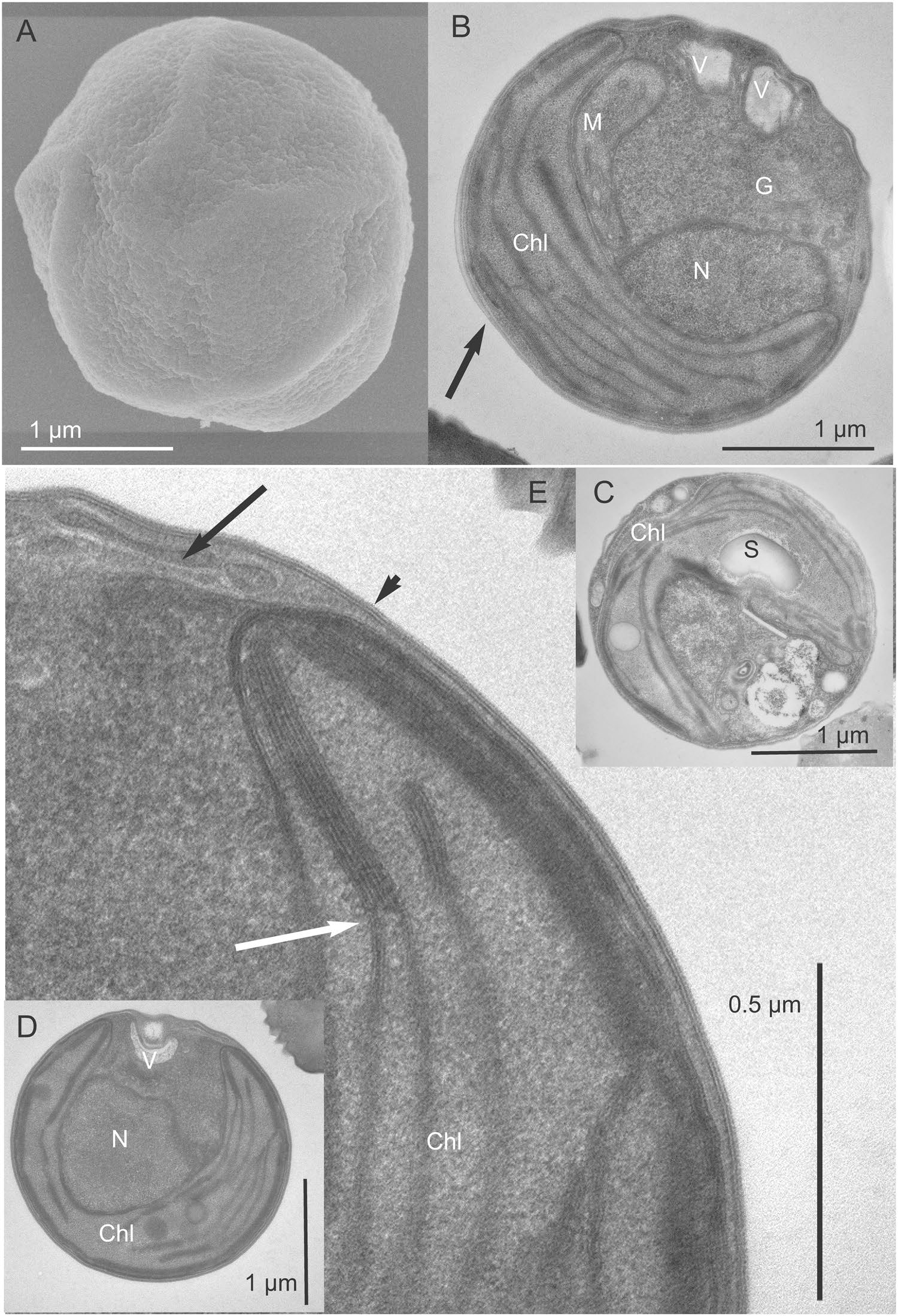
- Chloropicon sieburthii, type species

Scientific classification
- Kingdom: Plantae
- Division: Chlorophyta
- Class: Chloropicophyceae
- Order: Chloropicales
- Family: Chloropicaceae
- Genus: Chloropicon; Lopes dos Santos & Eikrem 2017

Type species
- Chloropicon sieburthii Lopes dos Santos & Eikrem 2017

Species
- See text.

= Chloropicon =

Genus of green algae

Chloropicon is a genus of green algae in the class Chloropicophyceae.

== Description ==
Members of this genus are coccoid cells measuring 2–4 μm, characterized by having one green, often crescent-shaped chloroplast shaped with a starch grain, thylakoids that occur singly and in stacks of three, one central nucleus, one mitochondrion located between the nucleus and the chloroplast, 1–2 vacuoles present at the cell periphery that may contain particles, and a smooth surface of the cell wall.

== Taxonomy ==
The name Chloropicon references both its green color (chloro-) and its small size (-picon). There are 6 species in the genus:

- Chloropicon sieburthii Lopes dos Santos & Eikrem 2017 (type species)
- Chloropicon primus Lopes dos Santos & Eikrem sp. 2017
- Chloropicon roscoffensis Lopes dos Santos & Eikrem 2017
- Chloropicon mariensis Lopes dos Santos & Eikrem 2017
- Chloropicon laureae Lopes dos Santos & Eikrem 2017
- Chloropicon maureeniae Lopes dos Santos & Eikrem 2017
