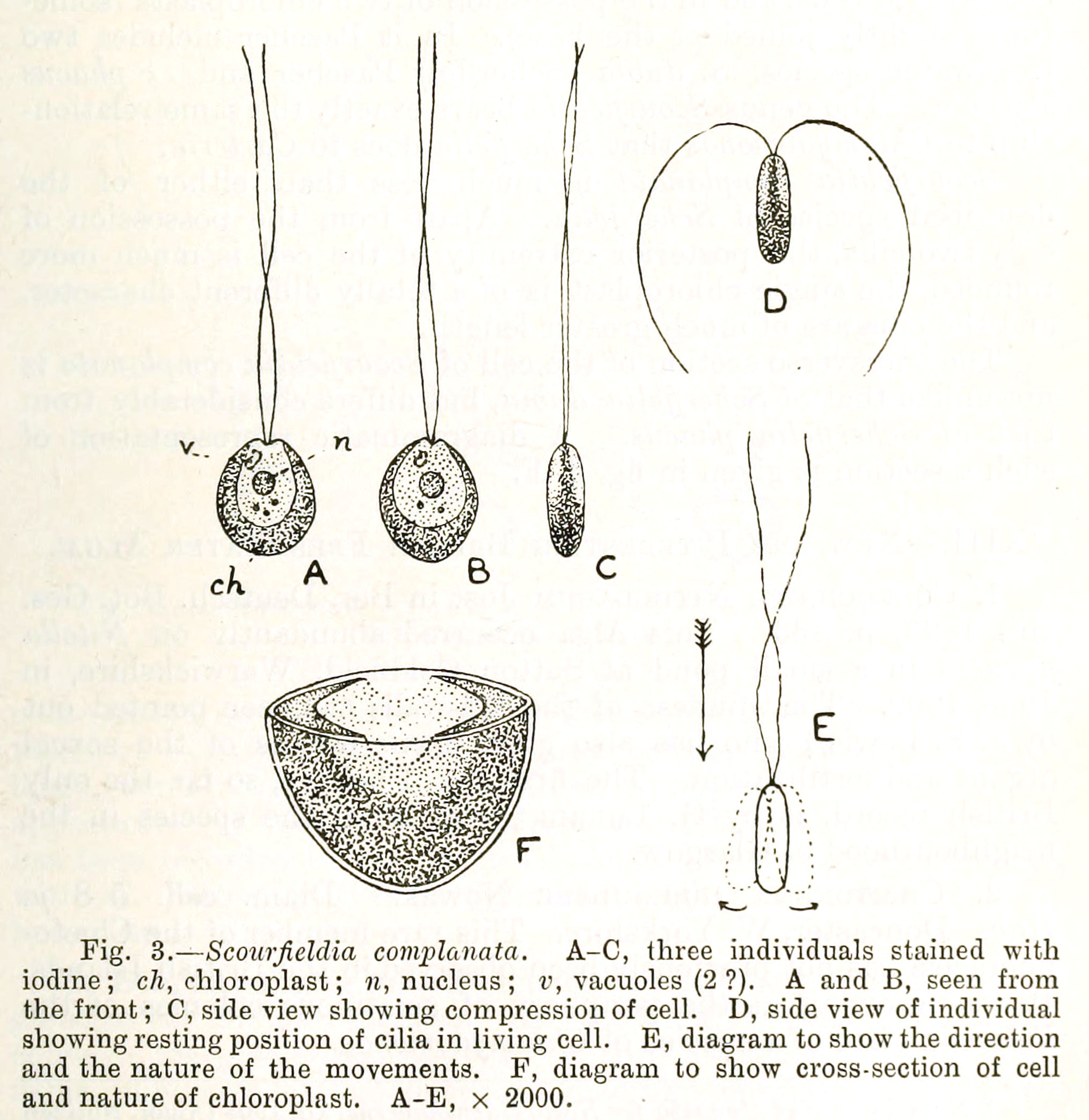
- Scourfeldia complanata

Scientific classification
- Kingdom: Plantae
- Division: Chlorophyta
- Class: Pedinophyceae
- Order: Scourfieldiales; Moestrup
- Family: Scourfieldiaceae; Moestrup
- Genus: Scourfieldia; G.S.West

Species
- See text

= Scourfieldia =

Genus of algae

Scourfieldia is a genus of green algae in the family Scourfieldiaceae. Cardiomonas Korshikov is an invalid synonym.

The genus was circumscribed by George Stephen West in J. Bot. vol.50 on page 326 in 1912.

The genus name of Scourfieldia is in honour of David Joseph Scourfield FLS FRMS ISO (1866–1949), who was a British civil servant and biologist known as an authority on the Cladocera.

== Species ==
Scourfieldia contains the following species:

- Scourfieldia caeca (Korshikov) J.H.Belcher & Swale, 1963
- Scourfieldia complanata G. S. West, 1912
- Scourfieldia cordiformis Takeda, 1916

WoRMS also accepts;

- Scourfieldia chlorolateralis A.G.Caljon, 2005
- Scourfieldia conica Schiller, 1954
- Scourfieldia ovata Kufferath, 1956
- Scourfieldia quadrata Pascher, 1927

Former species;

- Scourfieldia magnopyrenoidea Huber-Pestalozzi, 1961 accepted as (synonym of) Scourfieldia caeca
- Scourfieldia marina J.Throndsen, 1969 accepted as (synonym of) Pseudoscourfieldia marina (J.Throndsen) Manton, 1975
