= Prasinoderma coloniale =

Scientific classification
- Domain: Eukaryota
- Clade: Archaeplastida
- Clade: Viridiplantae
- Division: Prasinodermophyta
- Class: Prasinodermophyceae
- Order: Prasinodermatales
- Family: Prasinodermataceae
- Genus: Prasinoderma
- Species: P. coloniale

Binomial name
- Prasinoderma coloniale Hasegawa & Chihara, 1996

Species of algae

Prasinoderma coloniale is a species of green algae in the genus Prasinoderma, and the phylum Prasinodermophyta. It played a key role in the discovery of a third major phylum of green plants, Prasinodermophyta, distinct from Chlorophyta and Streptophyta. It is found in the Western Pacific Ocean.

== Characteristics ==
Prasinoderma coloniale forms loose, sticky colonies, unlike its solitary cousin P. singularis, the cells are spherical and non-flagellated. it is also shaped in a coccoid-like shape.

== Genomic features ==
Prasinoderma coloniale has an unusually high guanine-cytosine content of 69.8%. It also has a low rate of mutations through their genes. Their mitochondrial genome spans 54,546 bp and contains two trans-spliced group I introns in the large subunit rRNA gene, which is a rare feature among eukaryotes.

== History ==
It was discovered in the year 1996 by researchers T.Hasegawa and M. Chihara. It was first described as a new pelagic coccoid prasinophyte. In 2020, a study revealed that P. coloniale belonged to a separate phylum of green plants, the phylum diverged before the split between Chlorophyta and Streptophyta, making it extremely important for early plant evolution.

== Significance ==
Research has found that P. coloniale has unique adaptations for nutrient poor environments and has a rare form of C4 like photosynthesis and carbon-concentrating mechanisms.
