= Louis Fensterbank =

French molecular chemist

Louis Fensterbank FRSC
- Born: December 22, 1967 (age 58); Poitiers
- Education: Stony Brook University; École Supérieure de Chimie Physique Électronique de Lyon
- Awards: CNRS Silver Medal
- Scientific career
- Fields: Chemistry
- Workplaces: Sorbonne University (since 2004); French National Centre for Scientific Research (1995-2004)
- Doctoral advisor: Scott Sieburth
- Website: www.ipcm.fr/fensterbank-louis-787

Louis Fensterbank is a French scientist specialized in molecular chemistry. Professor at Sorbonne University and Senior Member of Institut Universitaire de France, he has been the director of the Institut Parisien de Chimie Moléculaire since 2017.

== Biography ==
In 1990, Fensterbank graduated as chemical engineer from Ecole Supérieure de Chimie Industrielle de Lyon, now École Supérieure de Chimie Physique Électronique de Lyon. He obtained his PhD in 1993 at the State University of New York at Stony Brook under the guidance of Scott Sieburth. Following a lecturer position at the Pierre and Marie Curie University (UPMC), he was appointed in 1995 by the French National Centre for Scientific Research as a chargé de recherche with Max Malacria. In 2004, he became professor at UPMC, now Sorbonne Université.

== Research ==
Louis Fensterbank's research objectives deal with the invention of synthetic methods by means of three interconnected themes: radical chemistry, organometallic catalysis and organosilicon chemistry. He developed original radical processes using new partners that lead to complex molecular systems. In the context of a "greener" radical chemistry, new radical promotors have been invented. These studies have also stimulated the development of new redox systems based on the oxidation of anions (enolates, trifluoroborates and silicates). Photoredox versions of these processes have been devised.

His contribution in organometallic catalysis has focused on the electrophilic activation of π-systems by gold or platinum complexes, which allows expedient access to polycyclic systems from polyunsaturated substrates and can be applied to the total synthesis of complex terpenes. Mechanistic studies, as well as the development of enantioselective versions of these reactions have accompanied these works. His group is now involved in the photoactivation of gold-catalyzed processes, notably via photosensitization

His third active field of investigation concerns the development of organosilicon Lewis acids and their use in synthesis or as precursors of hypercoordinated silicon species of interest.

He is co-author of more than 250 publications and book chapters.

== Awards ==
In 2008, Louis Fensterbank was nominated junior member of Institut Universitaire de France, of which he became a senior member in 2021. He was awarded the Clavel Lespiau Prize of the French Academy of Sciences in 2014, the Prize of the Division de Chimie Organique of the Société chimique de France in 2016, and the Silver Medal of the French National Centre for Scientific Research in 2017. He has been a fellow of the Royal Society of Chemistry since 2017.

Fensterbank was a visiting scientist at the Australian National University in 2009 and invited professor at the Osaka Prefecture University in 2017 and at Okayama University in 2019.
