= Palmoclathrus =

Scientific classification
- Domain: Eukaryota
- Clade: Archaeplastida
- Clade: Viridiplantae
- Division: Prasinodermophyta
- Class: Palmophyllophyceae
- Order: Palmophyllales
- Family: Palmophyllaceae
- Genus: Palmoclathrus; Womersley, 1971
- Species: P. stipitatus

Binomial name
- Palmoclathrus stipitatus Womersley, 1971

Genus of algae

Palmoclathrus is a monotypic genus of alga. The only species in the genus is Palmoclathrus stipitatus.

Palmoclathrus is rare and has only been reported from the marine waters of southern Australia. It grows attached to rock surfaces at a depth of 7 to 60 m.

The thalli of Palmoclathrus consist of dark green blades attached to a terete stipe that is 8 cm high and 5-10 mm in diameter. The blade has a peltate base that grows up to 2 cm long; the upper portion of the blade grows up to 15 cm, and is highly perforate (with many holes). The blade consists of a mucilaginous matrix with cells embedded in it; the cells are interspersed throughout the matrix, not connected to each other, forming a more dense layer underneath the blade surface. Cells are 8-10 μm in diameter and have one nucleus and a single cup-shaped chloroplast without pyrenoids. Eyespots and contractile vacuoles are lacking.
