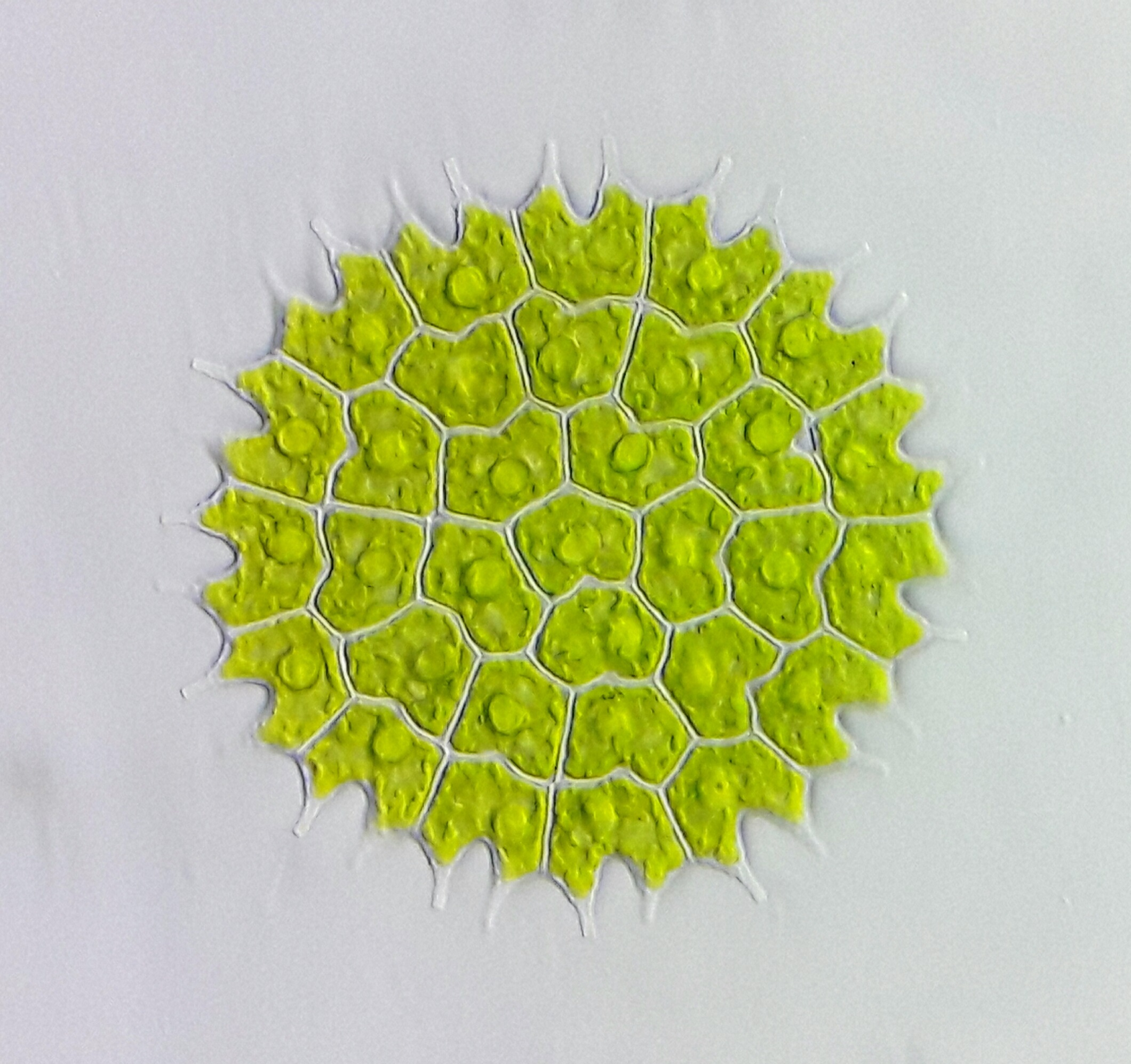
- Pediastrum sp.

Scientific classification
- Kingdom: Plantae
- Division: Chlorophyta
- Clade: UTC clade Fučiková et al. 2014

= UTC clade =

The UTC clade is a grouping of Chlorophyta.

It consists of Ulvophyceae, Trebouxiophyceae and Chlorophyceae.
