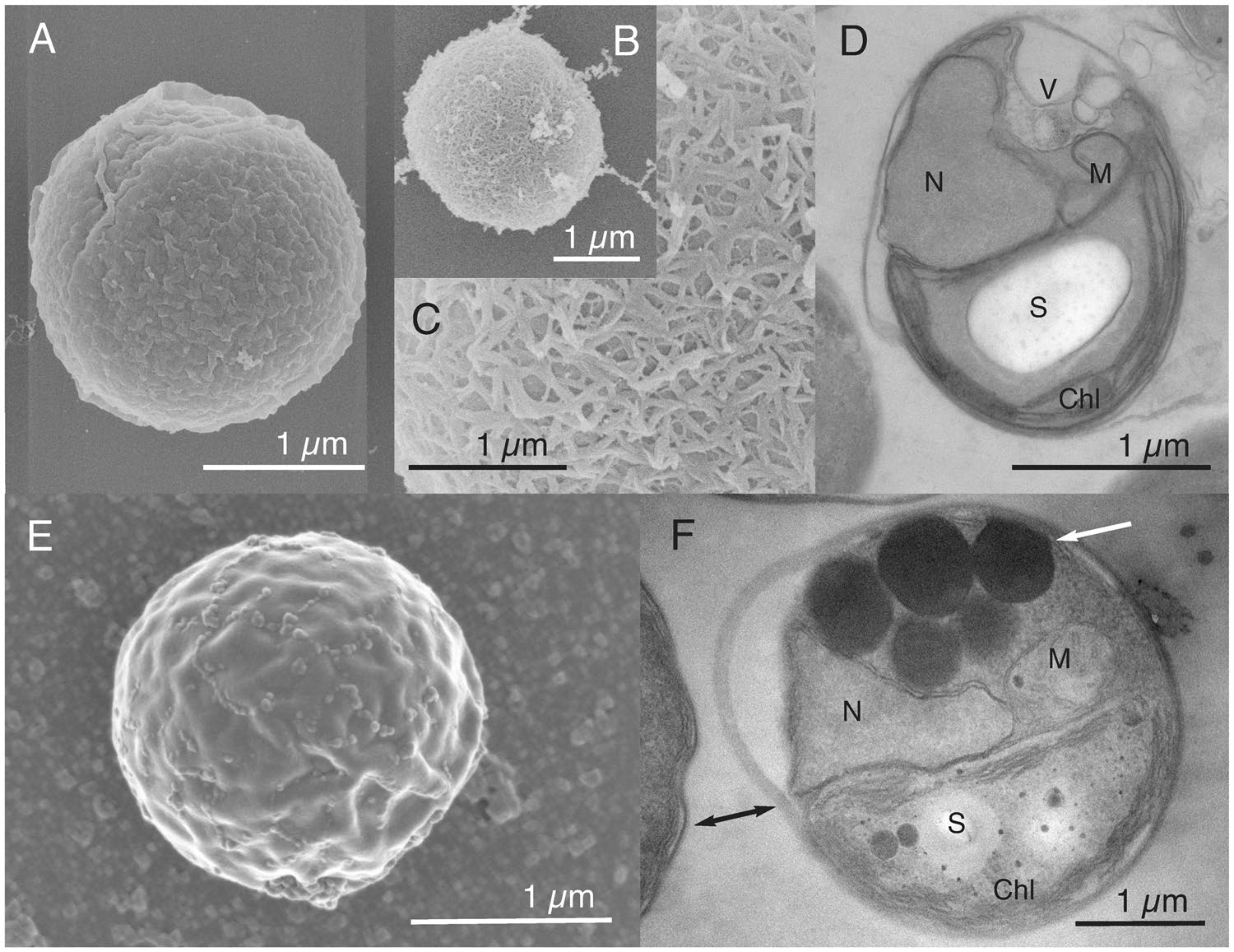
- Chloroparvula japonica (A-D) and Chloroparvula pacifica (E-F)

Scientific classification
- Kingdom: Plantae
- Division: Chlorophyta
- Class: Chloropicophyceae
- Order: Chloropicales
- Family: Chloropicaceae
- Genus: Chloroparvula; Lopes dos Santos & Eikrem 2017

Type species
- Chloroparvula pacifica Lopes dos Santos & Eikrem 2017

Species
- Chloroparvula pacifica; Chloroparvula japonica

= Chloroparvula =

Genus of green algae

Chloroparvula is a genus of green algae in the class Chloropicophyceae.

== Description ==
Members of this genus are distinguished from other species of Chloropicophyceae by having a thick and smooth wall, sometimes with fibrils, and a string-like ornamentation.

== Taxonomy ==
The name Chloroparvula references both its green color (chloro-) and its small size (-parvula). There are two species in the genus:

- Chloroparvula pacifica Lopes dos Santos & Eikrem 2017 (type species)
- Chloroparvula japonica Lopes dos Santos & Eikrem 2017
