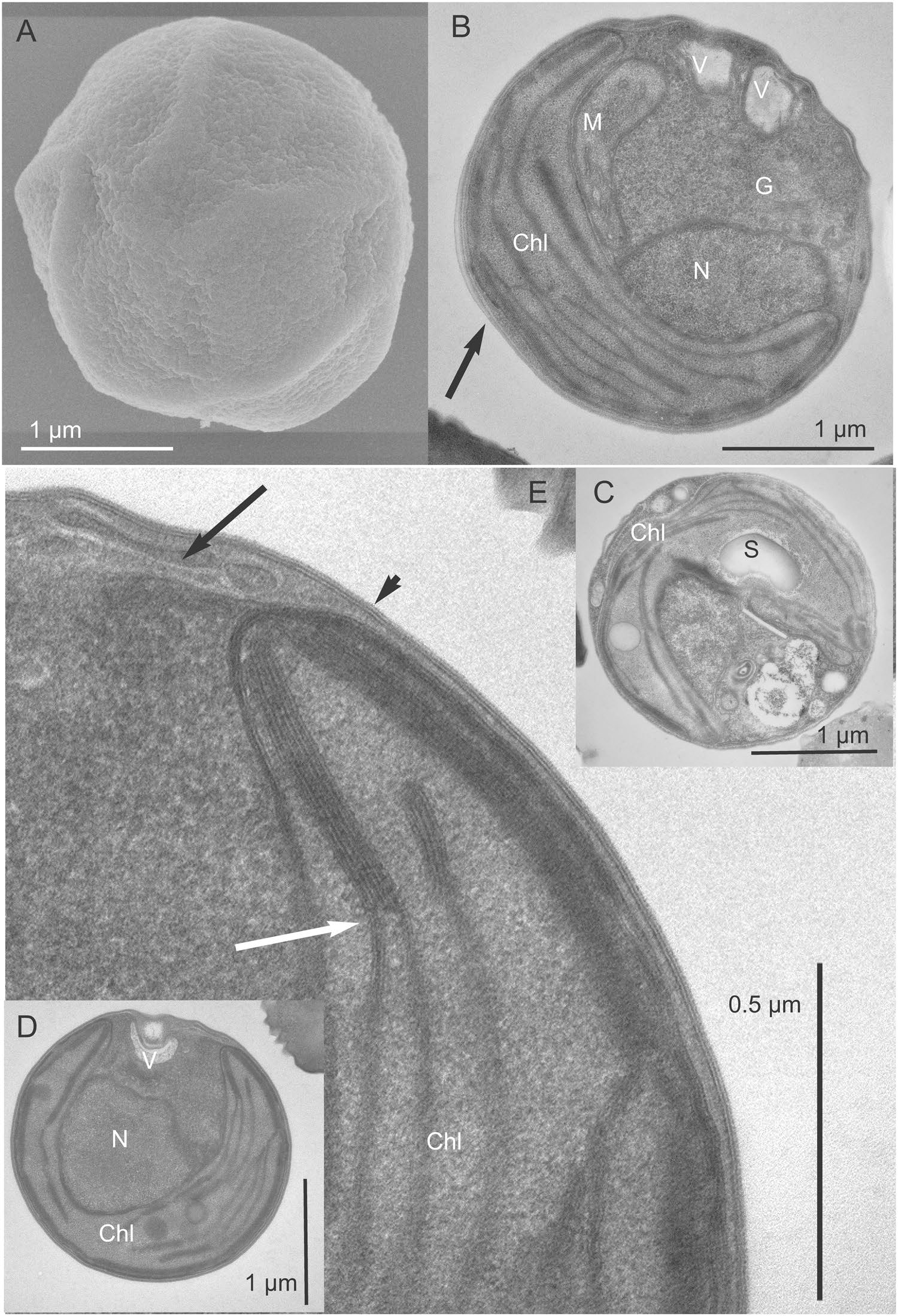
- Chloropicon sieburthii, type species

Scientific classification
- Kingdom: Plantae
- Division: Chlorophyta
- Class: Chloropicophyceae; Lopes dos Santos & Eikrem 2017
- Order: Chloropicales; Lopes dos Santos & Eikrem 2017
- Family: Chloropicaceae; Lopes dos Santos & Eikrem 2017

Genera
- Chloropicon; Chloroparvula

= Chloropicaceae =

Class of green algae

Chloropicophyceae is a class of green algae in the division Chlorophyta that, along with Picocystophyceae, coincides with the traditional "prasinophyte clade VII". Chloropicophyceae has a single order, Chloropicales with a single family, Chloropicaceae.

== Description ==
Members of this class are coccoid green cells, with a diameter of 1.5–4 μm, found in marine waters, with one nucleus, one mitochondrion, and one chloroplast surrounded by two membranes, containing starch grain; their single chloroplast has chlorophylls a and b; they lack pyrenoid and flagella; and they have a layered cell wall. Their sexual reproduction is unknown.

== Taxonomy ==
In total, this class contains eight newly described species, belonging to two genera. The taxonomy goes as follows:

- Division Chlorophyta Reichenbach 1834
  - Class Chloropicophyceae Lopes dos Santos & Eikrem 2017
    - Order Chloropicales Lopes dos Santos & Eikrem 2017
      - Family Chloropicaceae Lopes dos Santos & Eikrem 2017
        - Genus Chloropicon Lopes dos Santos & Eikrem 2017
          - Chloropicon sieburthii Lopes dos Santos & Eikrem 2017 (type species)
          - Chloropicon primus Lopes dos Santos & Eikrem 2017
          - Chloropicon roscoffensis Lopes dos Santos & Eikrem 2017
          - Chloropicon mariensis Lopes dos Santos & Eikrem 2017
          - Chloropicon laureae Lopes dos Santos & Eikrem 2017
          - Chloropicon maureeniae Lopes dos Santos & Eikrem 2017
        - Genus Chloroparvula Lopes dos Santos & Eikrem 2017
          - Chloroparvula pacifica Lopes dos Santos & Eikrem 2017 (type species)
          - Chloroparvula japonica Lopes dos Santos & Eikrem 2017

== Phylogeny ==
In the 2017 article where the new class is described, it is shown as the sister clade of the class Picocystophyceae. The internal relationships are shown in the tree below, which is a simplified version of the phylogenetic tree elaborated in the research:

- Chlorokybus atmophyticus (outgroup)
- - core Chlorophytes
  - clade VII
    - Picocystophyceae
      Picocystis salinarum
    - Chloropicophyceae
      - - Chloroparvula pacifica
        - Chloroparvula japonica
      - - Chloropicon maureeniae
        - - Chloropicon mariensis
          - - Chloropicon laureae
            - - Chloropicon primus
              - - Chloropicon sieburthii
                - Chloropicon roscoffensis
