= Rhizoplast =

Root-like fiber below the flagella of some eukaryotes

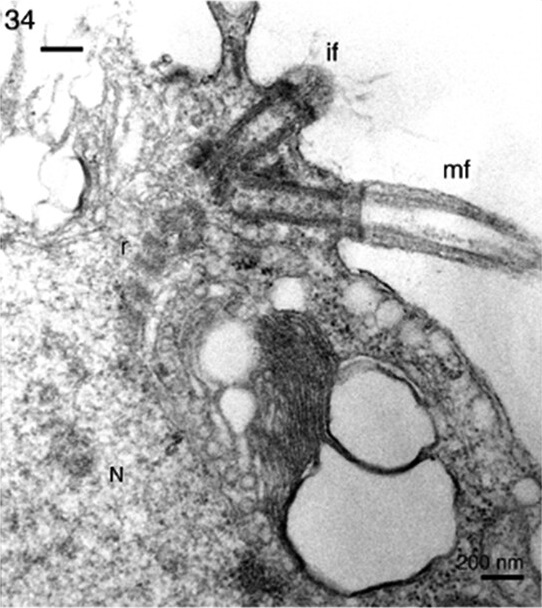
Longitudinal section of the pelagophyte Plocamiomonas psychrophila under transmission electron microscopy showing system II fibre or rhizoplast (r) positioned at the base of the basal bodies and continuing parallel to the nucleus (N). The mature (mf) and immature (if) flagella are also visible.

The rhizoplast (also known as internal flagellar root, fibrous root or cross-banded root) is an organelle present in a variety of flagellates, including ochrophyte and chlorophyte algae and some fungi. This term is used for a variety of striated, fibrous root-like structures that attach to the basal bodies (kinetosome) of the flagella and end in some other organelle. In the strictest sense, the term refers specifically to a type of root (known as system II fiber) that is composed of contractile microfibrils of centrin and connects directly to the surface of the cell nucleus.

== Description ==
Rhizoplasts are organelles that display a great diversity of structure and composition. They are components of the cytoskeleton as flagellar roots, closely related to the flagellar apparatus in many single-celled eukaryotic organisms that bear flagella (i.e., flagellates). There are two types of flagellar roots, both arising from the base of the flagella: the superficial root (also known as the microtubular root), which underlies the cell membrane, and the internal flagellar root or rhizoplast (also known as the fibrous root), which projects into the cell.

Rhizoplasts appear as striated, fibrous roots that are attached to the basal bodies (the structures from which flagella arise) at their proximal end, and develop in the direction of the cell nucleus. They are composed of protein microfibrils organized in rootlets, but their exact proteic composition and structure varies from one group of organisms to another. This great diversity is not known to be homologous; it is simply a synonym for any structure that appears as cross-banded or striated flagellar roots, which are commonly seen in flagellates.

In the strictest sense, the term 'rhizoplast' only refers to those internal flagellar roots which connect directly to the surface of the nucleus. These are alternatively known as basal body-nucleus connectors or system II fibers, and are found in some chlorophytes and most chromophyte families. These are composed of centrin proteins that assemble in contractile bundles of microfibrils, similar to muscle fibers; these are capable of contraction modulated by calcium ions. In contrast, system I fibers, also commonly referred to as rhizoplasts, are composed of the non-contractile protein assemblin.

== Origin ==
The term 'rhizoplast' was first introduced by botanist Pierre Augustin Dangeard in 1901 through his comparative studies on zoospores and spermatozoids. He used the term to refer to a filamentous structure that connected the basal bodies and the cell nucleus, which he observed via light microscopy on the chloroplast-lacking alga Polytoma uvella. During the early 20th century, this observation lead to the popularized assumption that the flagellar apparatus was functionally connected to the nucleus in most flagellate cells. However, in the second half of the century this relationship was disproven for many species via electron microscopy studies: very often they end in some other unrelated structure, such as the pyrenoid or the cell membrane. Only some select groups, such as some chlorophytes and many ochrophytes, maintain rhizoplasts as complex connectors between the nucleus and the basal bodies.

== Occurrence ==
=== Fungi ===
Rhizoplasts are present in some zoospores of fungi. The chytrid genus Rhizophlyctis is characterized by the presence of a fibrous rhizoplast that directly links the nucleus with the kinetosome. It may play a role as a hinge during the redirection of movement. The aphelid species Aphelidium collabens has a striated rhizoplast that covers the anterior end of the kinetosome and ends near the posterior end of the nucleus.

== Function ==
There are many theories and speculations on the functionality of this union between the nucleus and the flagellar apparatus given by rhizoplasts, including:

- Anchoring for the flagella. The rhizoplasts are firmly attached to the flagellar apparatus; if a cell bursts, both structures remain together as a unit. For this reason, they are thought to have a role in the positioning of the basal bodies.
- Formation and positioning of the mitotic spindle. During mitosis (specifically prophase) in cells of Ochromonas and Poteriochromonas, the rhizoplast replicates and migrates attached to one of the two pairs of flagella. The opposite end of the two rhizoplasts attaches to the centrosome at each pole of the cell and begins forming the spindle. This ensures that the flagella are equally distributed among daughter cells.
- Transmission of intracellular stimuli. The flagella are used in some cells as sensory transducers for rapid responses, including cellular responses upon contact between two chlorophyte gametes. It is speculated that the rhizoplast serves some role in the fertilization process, but its participation is still poorly understood. An association between a flagellar root and the eyespot apparatus in both chlorophytes and ochrophytes has also been suggested, but only the superficial or microtubular root seems to participate.
