= Marsupiomonadales =

Scientific classification
- Clade: Viridiplantae
- Division: Chlorophyta
- Class: Pedinophyceae
- Order: Marsupiomonadales; Marin

Families
- Marsupiomonadaceae; Resultomonadaceae

Order of algae

Marsupiomonadales is an order of green algae in the class Pedinophyceae.
