= Algaenan =

Resistant biopolymer in the cell walls of green algae

Algaenan is the resistant biopolymer in the cell walls of unrelated groups of green algae, and facilitates their preservation in the fossil record.
