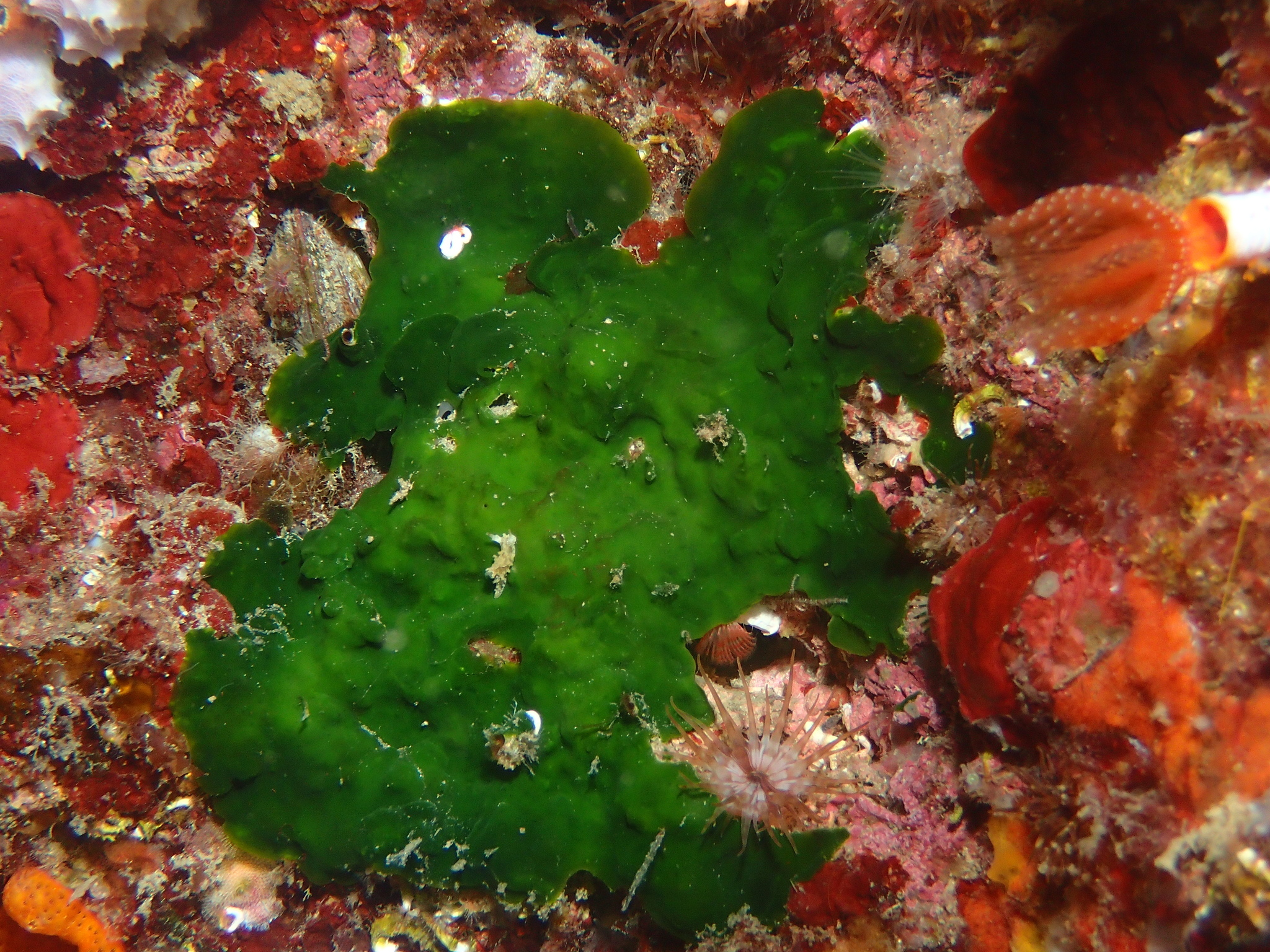
- Palmophyllum crassum

Scientific classification
- Clade: Viridiplantae
- Phylum: Prasinodermophyta
- Class: Palmophyllophyceae
- Order: Palmophyllales
- Family: Palmophyllaceae; Zechman et al., 2010

Genera
- see text

= Palmophyllaceae =

Order of algae

The Palmophyllales are a deep-branching order of thalloid green alga, containing the single family Palmophyllaceae. They possibly form a sister group to the Chlorophyta. They survive today in deep waters, and can be found at 210 meters below the surface, where predation pressure is reduced. The group contains the genera Palmophyllum, Verdigellas and Palmoclathrus. The morphology of Palmophyllales is unusual in that they are composed of cells in a gelatinous matrix, so they are multicellular, but not in a conventional way.

== Genera ==
- Palmoclathrus Womersley 1971
- Palmophyllum Kützing 1845 non Conwentz 1886
- Verdigellas Ballantine & Norris 1994
