= John Sieburth =

John McNeill Sieburth (2 September 1927 – 7 December 2006) was a Canadian-born biologist. Sieburth spent his early career studying birds, then turned his attention to marine microorganisms.

Sieburth was born on 2 September 1927 in Calgary, Alberta, and was raised in Vancouver, British Columbia. He graduated from University of British Columbia in 1949, subsequently earning a master's degree from Washington State University two years later, followed by a doctorate at the University of Minnesota in 1955, after which he began his teaching career at Virginia Tech within the school's veterinary department. In completing his Ph.D., Sieburth studied turkeys. His research interest later turned to penguins, then microorganisms. Sieburth left Virginia Tech in 1960 to accept a professorship in oceanography and microbiology at the University of Rhode Island, where he retired in 1991.

Sieburth met Janice Fae Boston while she was studying nutrition at Washington State. The couple married in 1950 and had five children, including chemist Scott Sieburth. John Sieburth died on 7 December 2006 in West Kingston, Rhode Island, from dementia complications. Janice Sieburth earned a master's in library science from the University of Rhode Island in 1972, and worked at the Pell Marine Sciences Library at the Narragansett Bay Campus from 1987 to 1996. She authored Online Search Services in the Academic Library in 1988. She died in 2019.

== Selected publications ==
- Sieburth, John McNeill (1975). Microbial Seascapes. A Pictorial Essay on Marine Microorganisms and Their Environment. University Park Press. ISBN 9780839108023.
- Sieburth, John McNeill (1979). Sea Microbes. Oxford University Press. ISBN 9780195024197.
