= Scott Sieburth =

American chemist

Scott McNeill Sieburth is an American chemist.

Sieburth's parents were the librarian Janice Fae Boston and the biologist John McNeill Sieburth.

Sieburth completed a Bachelor of Science degree at Worcester Polytechnic Institute in 1977, and obtained a doctorate from Harvard University in 1983. He is a professor at Temple University. He was elected a fellow of the American Chemical Society in 2010.
