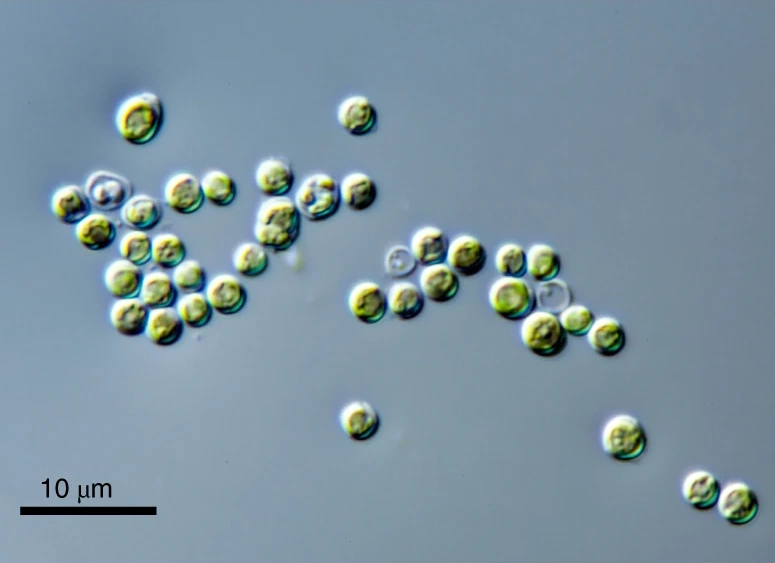
- P. coloniale under light microscopy

Scientific classification
- Clade: Viridiplantae
- Division: Prasinodermophyta
- Class: Prasinodermophyceae; B. Marin & Melkonian in Li et al., 2020
- Order: Prasinodermatales; B. Marin & Melkonian in Li et al., 2020
- Family: Prasinodermataceae; B. Marin & Melkonian in Li et al., 2020
- Genus: Prasinoderma; Hasegawa & Chihara 1996

Type species
- Prasinoderma coloniale Hasegawa & Chihara 1996

Species
- P. coloniale; P. singularis

Diversity
- 2 species

= Prasinoderma =

Genus of algae

Prasinoderma is a genus of green algae in the phylum Prasinodermophyta. Both species in the genus are unicellular, but P. coloniale forms loose sticky colonies.

== Classification ==
The genus contains two species:

- Prasinoderma coloniale Hasegawa & Chihara 1996
- Prasinoderma singularis Jouenne 2011
