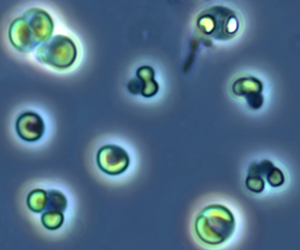
- Picocystis salinarum

Scientific classification
- Kingdom: Plantae
- Division: Chlorophyta
- Class: Picocystophyceae; Eikrem & Lopes dos Santos
- Order: Picocystales; Eikrem & Lopes dos Santos
- Family: Picocystaceae; Eikrem & Lopes dos Santos
- Genus: Picocystis; R.A.Lewin 2001 emend. Eikrem & Lopes dos Santos 2017
- Species: P. salinarum

Binomial name
- Picocystis salinarum R.A.Lewin 2001

= Picocystis =

Genus of algae

Picocystis is a monotypic genus of green algae, the sole species is Picocystis salinarum. It is placed within its own class, Picocystophyceae in the division Chlorophyta.

== Structure ==
Picocystis salinarum cells under normal conditions have a spherical or oval shape. Their size ranges from 2 to 3 μm in diameter. Under conditions of nutrient depletion they appear to form a trillobe shape. This trillobe shape gives it the nickname Mickey Mouse, due to its appearance to the famous character's head. The general appearance resembles that of a standard green alga.

The pigments are composed mainly from chlorophyll a and b and the carotenoids violaxanthin, alloxanthin, monadoxanthin, neoxanthin, lutein, diatoxanthin and zeaxanthin.

The cell wall is mainly composed of polymers of the monosaccharide arabinose, polyarabinose.

== Habitat ==
The species have been found in saline or hypersaline alkaline environments.

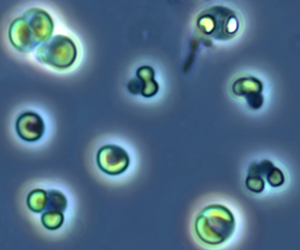
Picocystis is one of the smallest green algae. Picocystis salinarum occurs in vast numbers in Mono Lake, where it is also referred to as Mickey Mouse (see bottom left).
