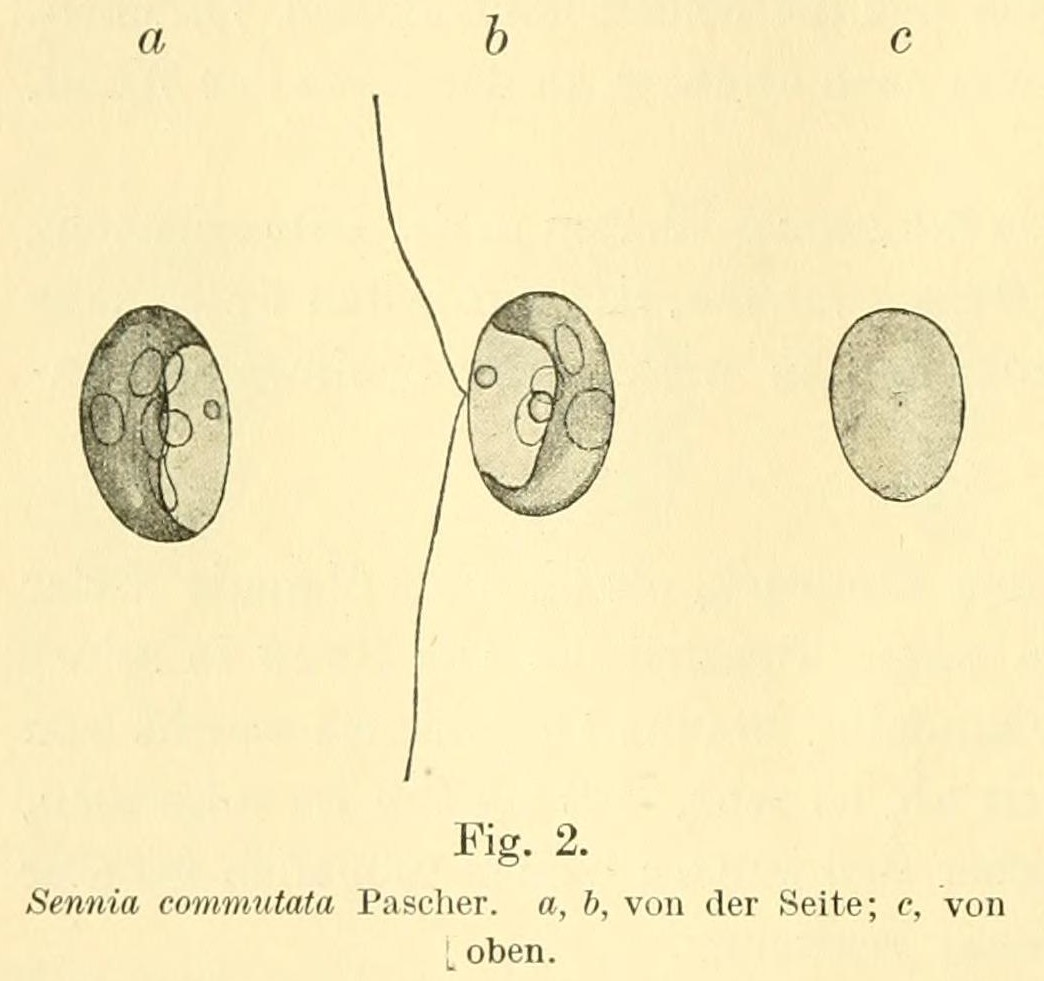
- Nephroselmis olivacea, formerly Sennia commutata

Scientific classification
- Kingdom: Plantae
- Division: Chlorophyta
- Class: Nephrophyceae; Cavalier-Smith
- Order: Nephroselmidales; Nakayama, Suda, Kawachi & Inouye
- Family: Nephroselmidaceae; Skuja ex P.C.Silva

Genera
- Anticomonas; Argillamonas; Bipedinomonas; Fluitomonas; Hiemalomonas; Myochloris; Nephroselmis; Prototractomonas; Pseudopedinomonas; Sennia; Sinamonas

= Nephroselmidaceae =

Family of algae

Nephroselmidaceae is a family of green algae, the only family in the order Nephroselmidales and the class Nephrophyceae within the division Chlorophyta.

Nephroselmidaceae consists of unicelullar organisms with two unequal flagella. The cell is covered with a periplast of scales. One or multiple chloroplasts are present in each cell.
