= Pseudoscourfieldiales =

Scientific classification
- Kingdom: Plantae
- Division: Chlorophyta
- Class: Pseudoscourfieldiophyceae; Crépeault, C.Otis, Pombert, Turmel & Lemieux
- Order: Pseudoscourfieldiales; Melkonian ex Crépeault, C.Otis, Pombert, Turmel & Lemieux

Family
- Pseudoscourfieldiaceae; Tasmanitaceae

Order of algae

Pseudoscourfieldiales is an order of green algae, the sole order in the class Pseudoscourfieldiophyceae.
