= Pseudoscourfieldiaceae =

Scientific classification
- Kingdom: Plantae
- Division: Chlorophyta
- Class: Pseudoscourfieldiophyceae
- Order: Pseudoscourfieldiales
- Family: Pseudoscourfieldiaceae; Crépeault et al. 2024

Genera
- Crassosphaera; Pseudoscourfieldia

Family of algae

Pseudoscourfieldiaceae, formerly Pycnococcaceae is a family of green algae in the order Pseudoscourfieldiales. The defining features of this family include the single invagination of the pyrenoid where the mitochondrial membrane fits into it and the "decapore" - a ring of 10 pores through the thick cell wall.

The family was renamed to Pseudoscourfieldiaceae in 2024 by Crépeault et al., who also determined via ptDNA and mtDNA analyses, that Pycnococcus provasolii is a junior synonym of Pseudoscourfieldia marina.
