= Pedinophyceae =

Scientific classification
- Clade: Viridiplantae
- Division: Chlorophyta
- Subphylum: Chlorophytina
- Class: Pedinophyceae; Moestrup

Orders
- Marsupiomonadales; Pedinomonadales; Scourfieldiales

Class of algae

Pedinophyceae is a class of green algae in the division Chlorophyta.
