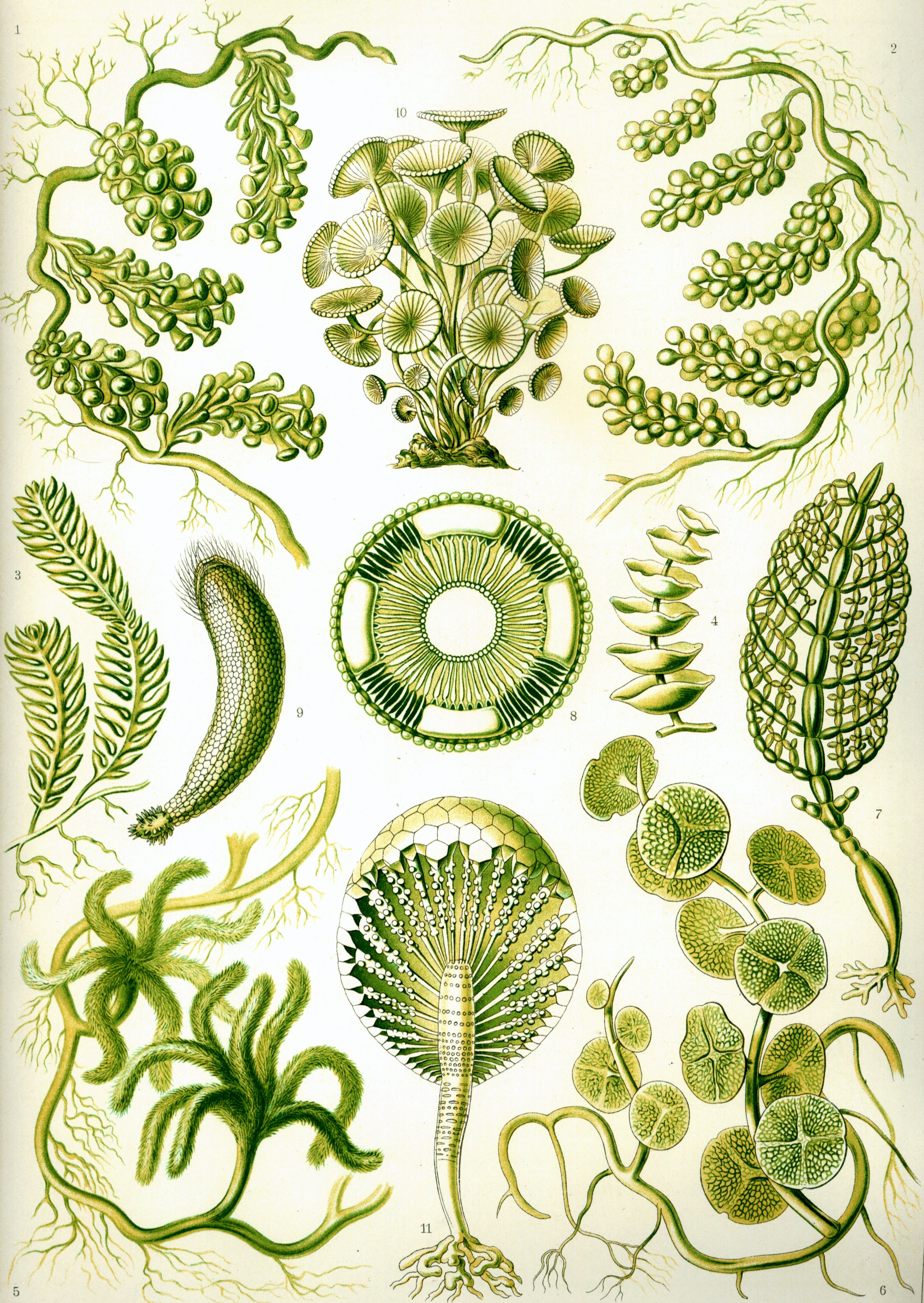
- "Siphoneae" from Ernst Haeckel's Kunstformen der Natur, 1904

Scientific classification
- Kingdom: Plantae
- Division: Chlorophyta; Pascher 1914, emend. Lewis & McCourt 2004

Classes
- Chloropicophyceae; †Chuariophyceae; Mamiellophyceae; Nephroselmidophyceae; Picocystophyceae; Pyramimonadophyceae; Chlorophytina; Chlorodendrophyceae; Pedinophyceae; Ulvophyceae; Trebouxiophyceae; Chlorophyceae

Diversity
- 7,934 species (6,851 living, 1,083 fossil)

Synonyms
- Chlorophycophyta Papenfuss 1946; Chlorophycota; Chlorophytina; Chlorophyllophyceae; Isokontae; Stephanokontae

= Chlorophyta =

Chlorophyta Temporal range: 1000–0 Ma

Phylum of green algae

Chlorophyta (Note: from Greek χλωρός chlōros 'pale green' and φυτόν phyton 'plant') or chlorophytes is a major division of green algae, and is sister taxon to the other major division Charophyta (a paraphyletic group of predominantly freshwater green algae, which form the monophyletic clade Streptophyta after including all land plants) as well as the proposed basal clade Prasinodermophyta, together with whom they form the major primary algae clade Viridiplantae (Plantae sensu stricto).

== Description ==
Chlorophytes are eukaryotic organisms composed of cells with a variety of coverings or walls, and usually a single green chloroplast in each cell. They are structurally diverse: most groups of chlorophytes are unicellular, such as the earliest-diverging prasinophytes, but in two major classes (Chlorophyceae and Ulvophyceae) there is an evolutionary trend toward various types of complex colonies and even multicellularity.

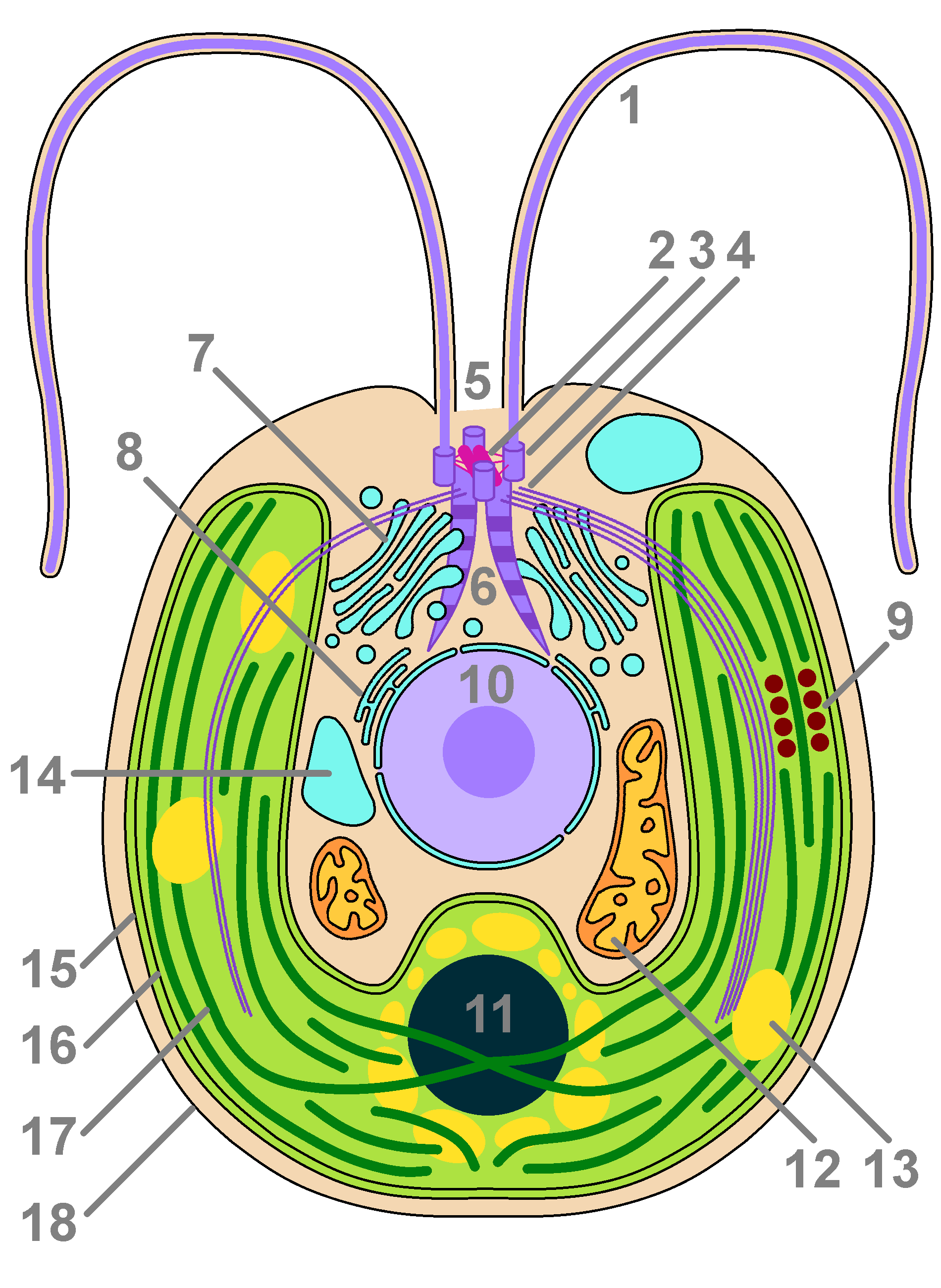
Simplified diagram of a chlorophyte cell combining structures seen across the phylum: 1) flagellum; 2) synistosome with fibers adhering to a pair of basal bodies; 3) basal body; 4) microtubular rootlet belonging to the "X-2-X-2" arrangement, in this case 4-2-4-2 (only front-facing rootlets are shown); 5) flagellar pit (only two of four flagella are shown); 6) rhizoplasts; 7) Golgi apparatus; 8) endoplasmic reticulum and nuclear envelope; 9) eyespot apparatus; 10) nucleus with nucleolus; 11) pyrenoid; 12) mitochondrion; 13) starch granule; 14) vacuole; 15) outer chloroplast membrane; 16) inner chloroplast membrane; 17) thylakoid; 18) cell membrane.

=== Chloroplasts ===
Chlorophyte cells contain green chloroplasts surrounded by a double-membrane envelope. These contain chlorophylls a and b, and the carotenoids carotin, lutein, zeaxanthin, antheraxanthin, violaxanthin, and neoxanthin, which are also present in the leaves of land plants. Some special carotenoids are present in certain groups, or are synthesized under specific environmental factors, such as siphonaxanthin, prasinoxanthin, echinenone, canthaxanthin, loroxanthin, and astaxanthin. They accumulate carotenoids under nitrogen deficiency, high irradiance of sunlight, or high salinity. In addition, they store starch inside the chloroplast as carbohydrate reserves. The thylakoids can appear single or in stacks. In contrast to other divisions of algae such as Ochrophyta, chlorophytes lack a chloroplast endoplasmic reticulum.

=== Flagellar apparatus ===
Chlorophytes often form flagellate cells that generally have two or four flagella of equal length, although in prasinophytes heteromorphic (i.e. differently shaped) flagella are common because different stages of flagellar maturation are displayed in the same cell. Flagella have been independently lost in some groups, such as the Chlorococcales. Flagellate chlorophyte cells have symmetrical cross-shaped ('cruciate') root systems, in which ciliary rootlets with a variable high number of microtubules alternate with rootlets composed of just two microtubules; this forms an arrangement known as the "X-2-X-2" arrangement, unique to chlorophytes. They are also distinguished from streptophytes by the place where their flagella are inserted: directly at the cell apex, whereas streptophyte flagella are inserted at the sides of the cell apex (sub-apically).

Below the flagellar apparatus of prasinophytes are rhizoplasts, contractile muscle-like structures that sometimes connect with the chloroplast or the cell membrane. In core chlorophytes, this structure connects directly with the surface of the nucleus.

The surface of flagella lacks microtubular hairs, but some genera present scales or fibrillar hairs. The earliest-branching groups have flagella often covered in at least one layer of scales, if not naked.

=== Metabolism ===
Chlorophytes and streptophytes differ in the enzymes and organelles involved in photorespiration. Chlorophyte algae use a dehydrogenase inside the mitochondria to process glycolate during photorespiration. In contrast, streptophytes (including land plants) use peroxisomes that contain glycolate oxidase, which converts glycolate to glycoxylate, and the hydrogen peroxide created as a subproduct is reduced by catalases located in the same organelles.

=== Reproduction and life cycle ===
Asexual reproduction is widely observed in chlorophytes. Among core chlorophytes, both unicellular groups can reproduce asexually through autospores, wall-less zoospores, fragmentation, plain cell division, and exceptionally budding. Multicellular thalli can reproduce asexually through motile zoospores, non-motile aplanospores, autospores, filament fragmentation, differentiated resting cells, and even unmated gametes. Colonial groups can reproduce asexually through the formation of autocolonies, where each cell divides to form a colony with the same number and arrangement of cells as the parent colony.

Many chlorophytes exclusively conduct asexual reproduction, but some display sexual reproduction, which may be isogamous (i.e., gametes of both sexes are identical), anisogamous (gametes are different) or oogamous (gametes are sperm and egg cells), with an evolutionary tendency towards oogamy. Their gametes are usually specialized cells differentiated from vegetative cells, although in unicellular Volvocales the vegetative cells can function simultaneously as gametes. Most chlorophytes have a diplontic life cycle (also known as zygotic), where the gametes fuse into a zygote which germinates, grows and eventually undergoes meiosis to produce haploid spores (gametes), similarly to ochrophytes and animals. Some exceptions display a haplodiplontic life cycle, where there is an alternation of generations, similarly to land plants. These generations can be isomorphic (i.e., of similar shape and size) or heteromorphic. The formation of reproductive cells usually does not occur in specialized cells, but some Ulvophyceae have specialized reproductive structures: gametangia, to produce gametes, and sporangia, to produce spores.

The earliest-diverging unicellular chlorophytes (prasinophytes) produce walled resistant stages called cysts or 'phycoma' stages before reproduction; in some groups the cysts are as large as 230 μm in diameter. To develop them, the flagellate cells form an inner wall by discharging mucilage vesicles to the outside, increase the level of lipids in the cytoplasm to enhance buoyancy, and finally develop an outer wall. Inside the cysts, the nucleus and cytoplasm undergo division into numerous flagellate cells that are released by rupturing the wall. In some species these daughter cells have been confirmed to be gametes; otherwise, sexual reproduction is unknown in prasinophytes.

== Ecology ==
=== Free-living ===
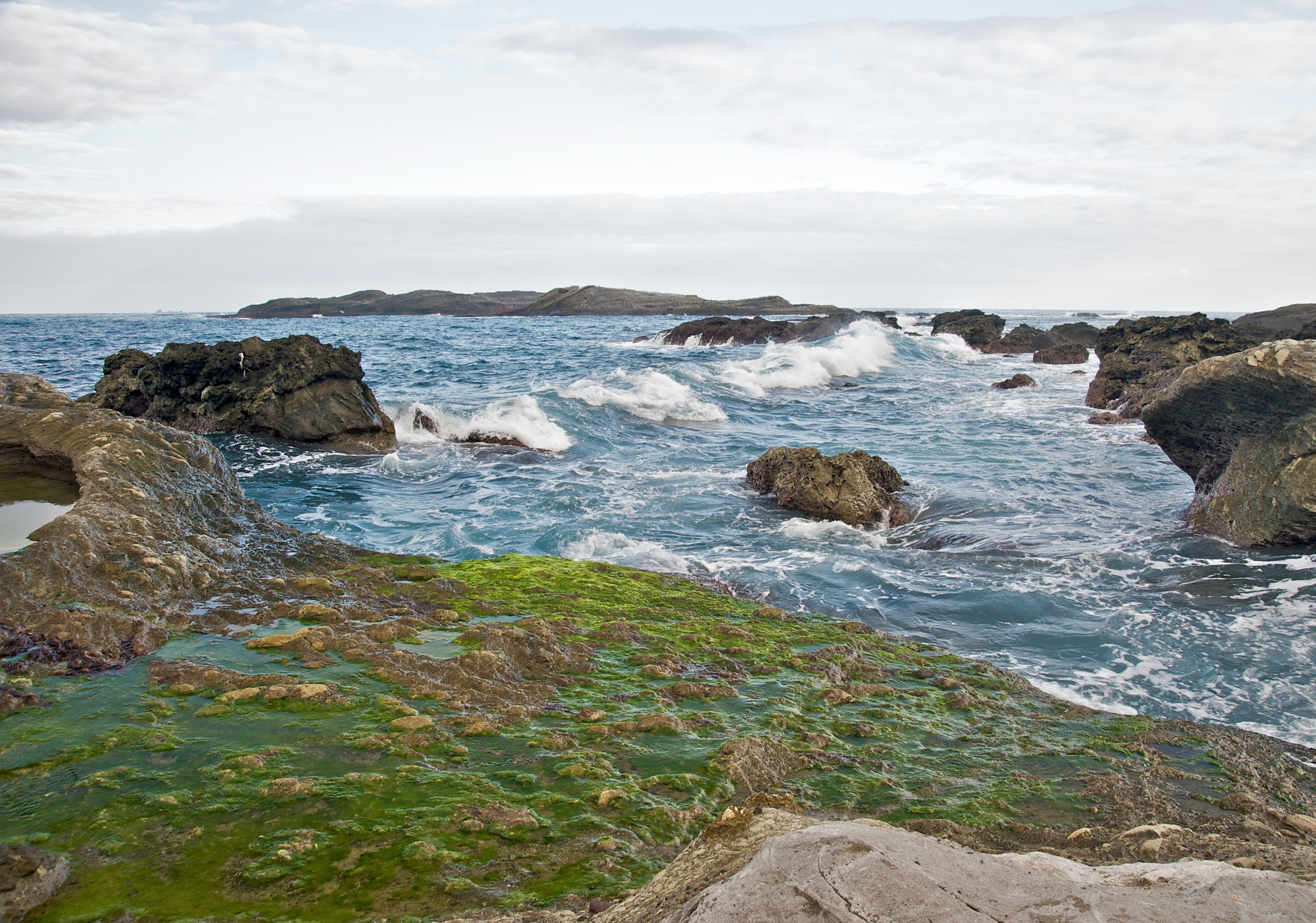
Green algae on coastal rocks at Shihtiping in Taiwan

Chlorophytes are an important portion of the phytoplankton in both freshwater and marine habitats, fixating more than a billion tons of carbon every year. They also live as multicellular macroalgae, or seaweeds, settled along rocky ocean shores. Most species of Chlorophyta are aquatic, prevalent in both marine and freshwater environments. About 90% of all known species live in freshwater. Some species have adapted to a wide range of terrestrial environments. For example, Chlamydomonas nivalis lives on summer alpine snowfields, and Trentepohlia species, live attached to rocks or woody parts of trees. Several species have adapted to specialised and extreme environments, such as deserts, arctic environments, hypersaline habitats, marine deep waters, deep-sea hydrothermal vents and habitats that experience extreme changes in temperature, light and salinity. Some groups, such as the Trentepohliales, are exclusively found on land.

=== Symbionts ===
Several species of Chlorophyta live in symbiosis with a diverse range of eukaryotes, including fungi (to form lichens), ciliates, forams, cnidarians and molluscs. Some species of Chlorophyta are heterotrophic, either free-living or parasitic. Others are mixotrophic bacterivores through phagocytosis. Two common species of the heterotrophic green alga Prototheca are pathogenic and can cause the disease protothecosis in humans and animals.

With the exception of the three classes Ulvophyceae, Trebouxiophyceae and Chlorophyceae in the UTC clade, which show various degrees of multicellularity, all the Chlorophyta lineages are unicellular. Some members of the group form symbiotic relationships with protozoa, sponges, and cnidarians. Others form symbiotic relationships with fungi to form lichens, but the majority of species are free-living. All members of the clade have motile flagellated swimming cells. Monostroma kuroshiense, an edible green alga cultivated worldwide and most expensive among green algae, belongs to this group.

== Systematics ==
=== Taxonomic history ===
The first mention of Chlorophyta belongs to German botanist Heinrich Gottlieb Ludwig Reichenbach in his 1828 work Conspectus regni vegetabilis. Under this name, he grouped all algae, mosses ('musci') and ferns ('filices'), as well as some seed plants (Zamia and Cycas). This usage did not gain popularity. In 1914, Bohemian botanist Adolf Pascher modified the name to encompass exclusively green algae, that is, algae which contain chlorophylls a and b and store starch in their chloroplasts. Pascher established a scheme where Chlorophyta was composed of two groups: Chlorophyceae, which included algae now known as Chlorophyta, and Conjugatae, which are now known as Zygnematales and belong to the Streptophyta clade from which land plants evolved.

During the 20th century, many different classification schemes for the Chlorophyta arose. The Smith system, published in 1938 by American botanist Gilbert Morgan Smith, distinguished two classes: Chlorophyceae, which contained all green algae (unicellular and multicellular) that did not grow through an apical cell; and Charophyceae, which contained only multicellular green algae that grew via an apical cell and had special sterile envelopes to protect the sex organs.

With the advent of electron microscopy studies, botanists published various classification proposals based on finer cellular structures and phenomena, such as mitosis, cytokinesis, cytoskeleton, flagella and cell wall polysaccharides. British botanist Frank Eric Round proposed in 1971 a scheme which distinguishes Chlorophyta from other green algal divisions Charophyta, Prasinophyta and Euglenophyta. He included four classes of chlorophytes: Zygnemaphyceae, Oedogoniophyceae, Chlorophyceae and Bryopsidophyceae. Other proposals retained the Chlorophyta as containing all green algae, and varied from one another in the number of classes. For example, the 1984 proposal by Mattox & Stewart included five classes, while the 1985 proposal by Bold & Wynne included only two, and the 1995 proposal by Christiaan van den Hoek and coauthors included up to eleven classes.

The modern usage of the name 'Chlorophyta' was established in 2004, when phycologists Lewis & McCourt firmly separated the chlorophytes from the streptophytes on the basis of molecular phylogenetics. All green algae that were more closely related to land plants than to chlorophytes were grouped as a paraphyletic division Charophyta.

Within the green algae, the earliest-branching lineages were grouped under the informal name of "prasinophytes", and they were all believed to belong to the Chlorophyta clade. However, in 2020 a study recovered a new clade and division known as Prasinodermophyta, which contains two prasinophyte lineages previously considered chlorophytes. Below is a cladogram representing the current state of green algal classification:

- Viridiplantae
  - - Prasinodermophyta
      - Prasinodermophyceae
      - Palmophyllophyceae
  - - Chlorophyta
      - - Pyramimonadophyceae
        - Mamiellophyceae
      - - Nephroselmidophyceae
        - - Pseudoscourfieldiales
          - - Picocystophyceae
            - - Chloropicophyceae
              - - core clade
                  - - Chlorodendrophyceae
                    - - UTC
                        - Trebouxiophyceae
                        - - Chlorophyceae
                          - Ulvophyceae
                  - Pedinophyceae
    - Streptophyta
      - - Mesostigmatophyceae
        - Chlorokybophyceae
      - - Klebsormidiophyceae
        - - Charophyceae
          - - Coleochaetophyceae
            - - Zygnematophyceae
              - Embryophyta (land plants)

=== Classification ===
Representatives of all living classes of chlorophytes

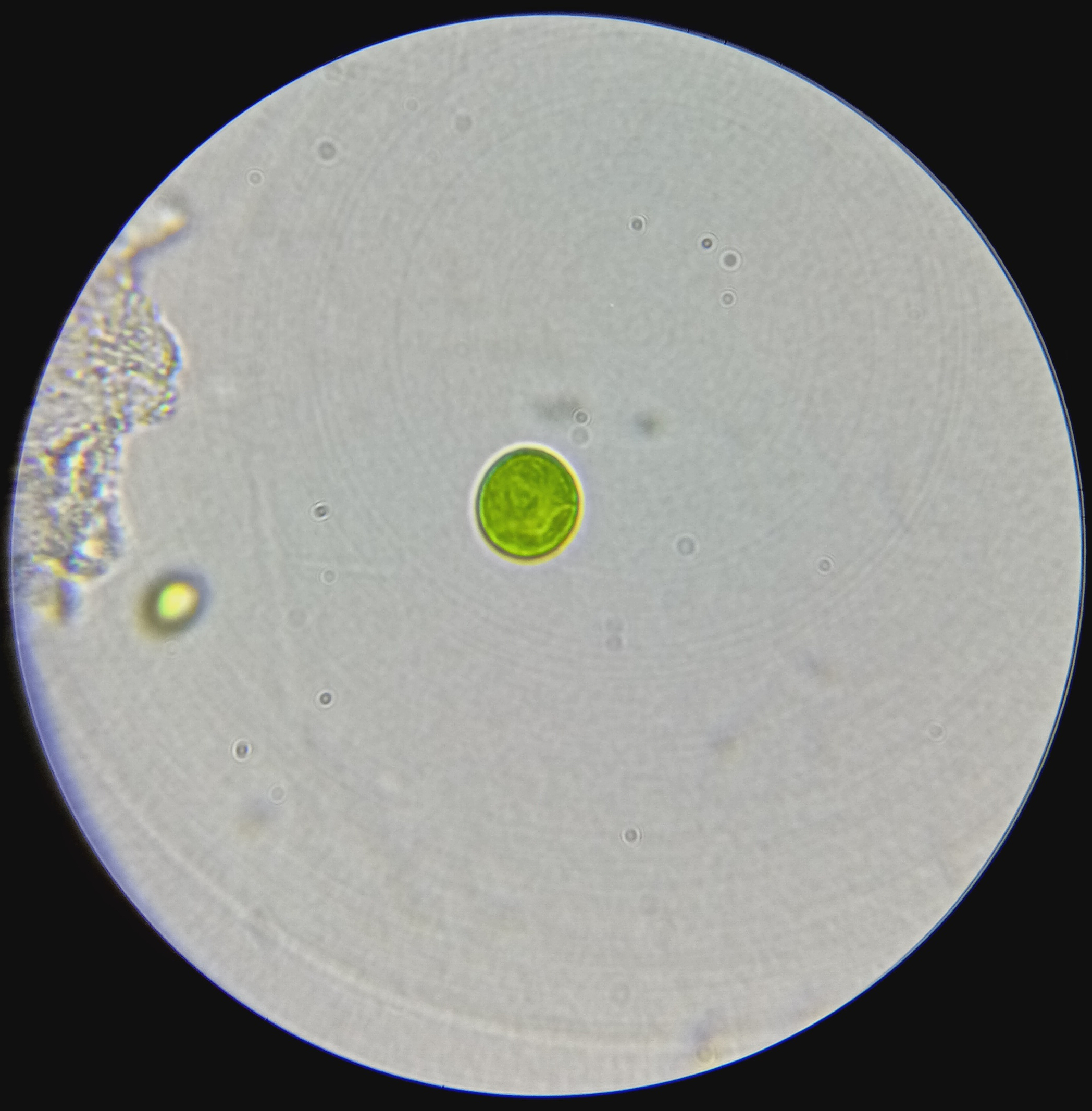
Tetraselmis suecica (Chlorodendrophyceae)

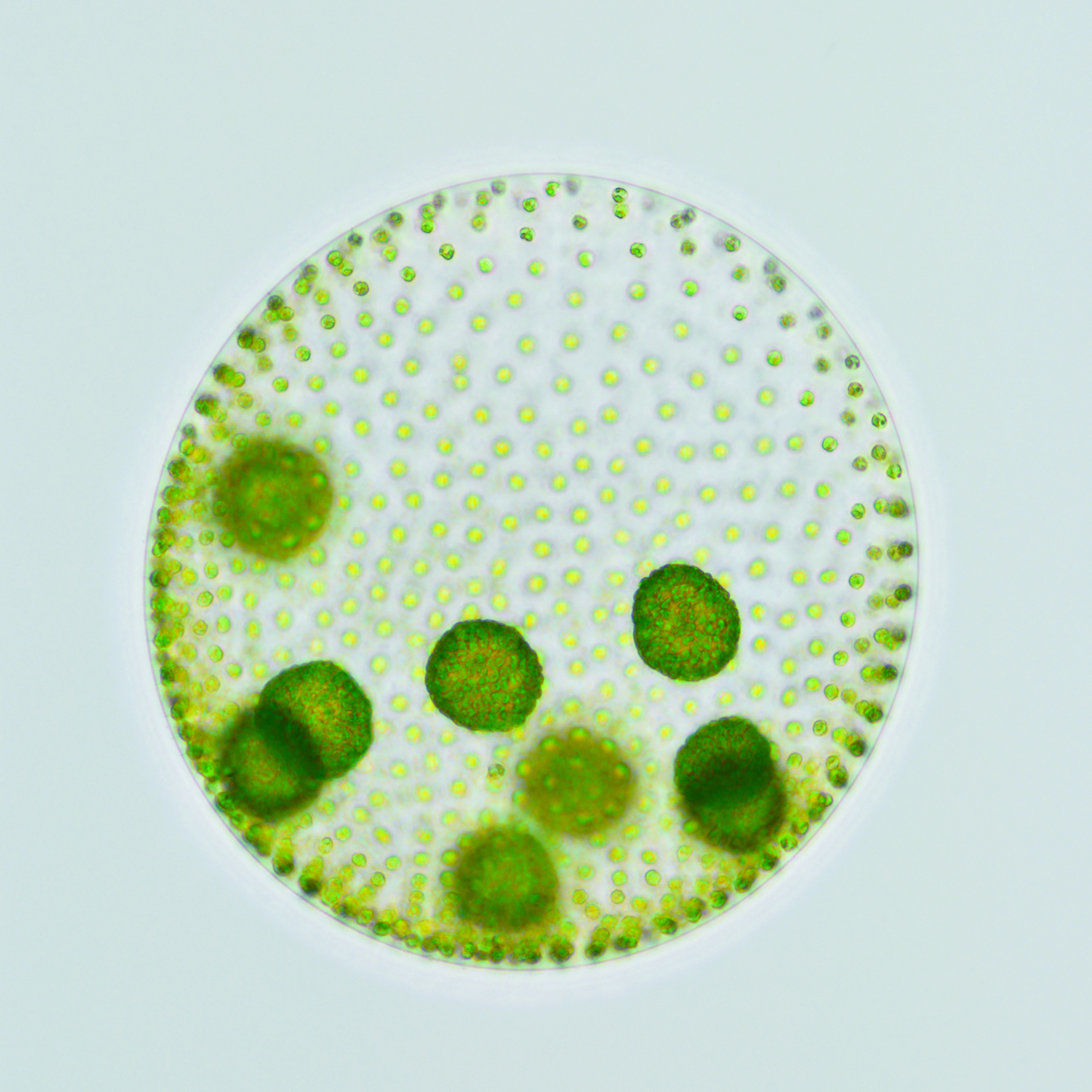
Volvox aureus (Chlorophyceae)

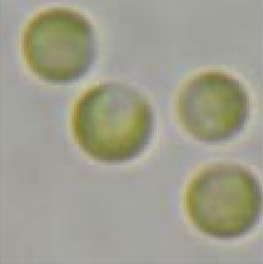
Chloropicon sieburthii (Chloropicophyceae)

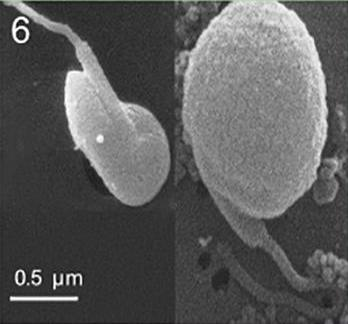
Micromonas pusilla (Mamiellophyceae)

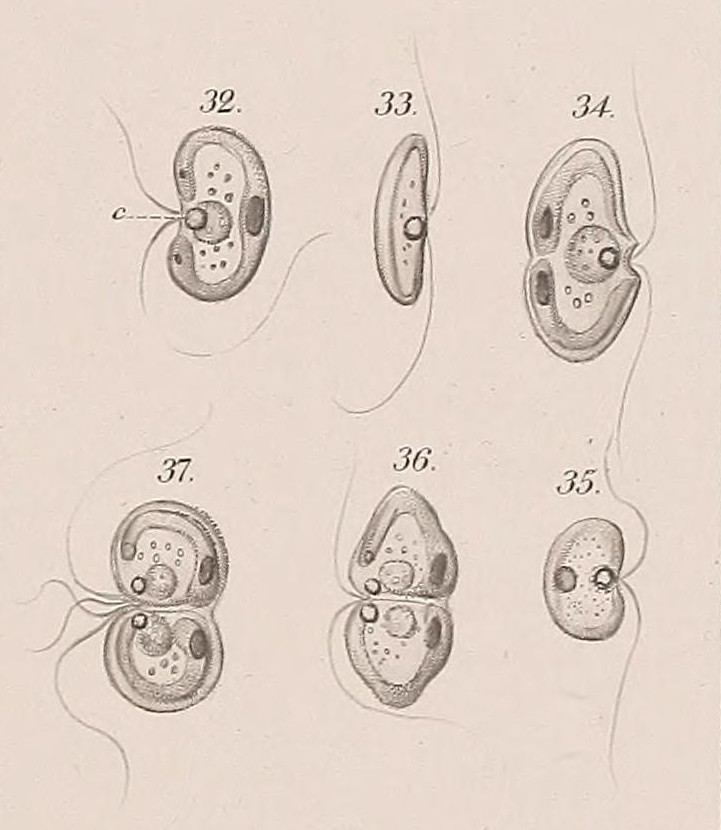
Nephroselmis olivacea (Nephroselmidophyceae)

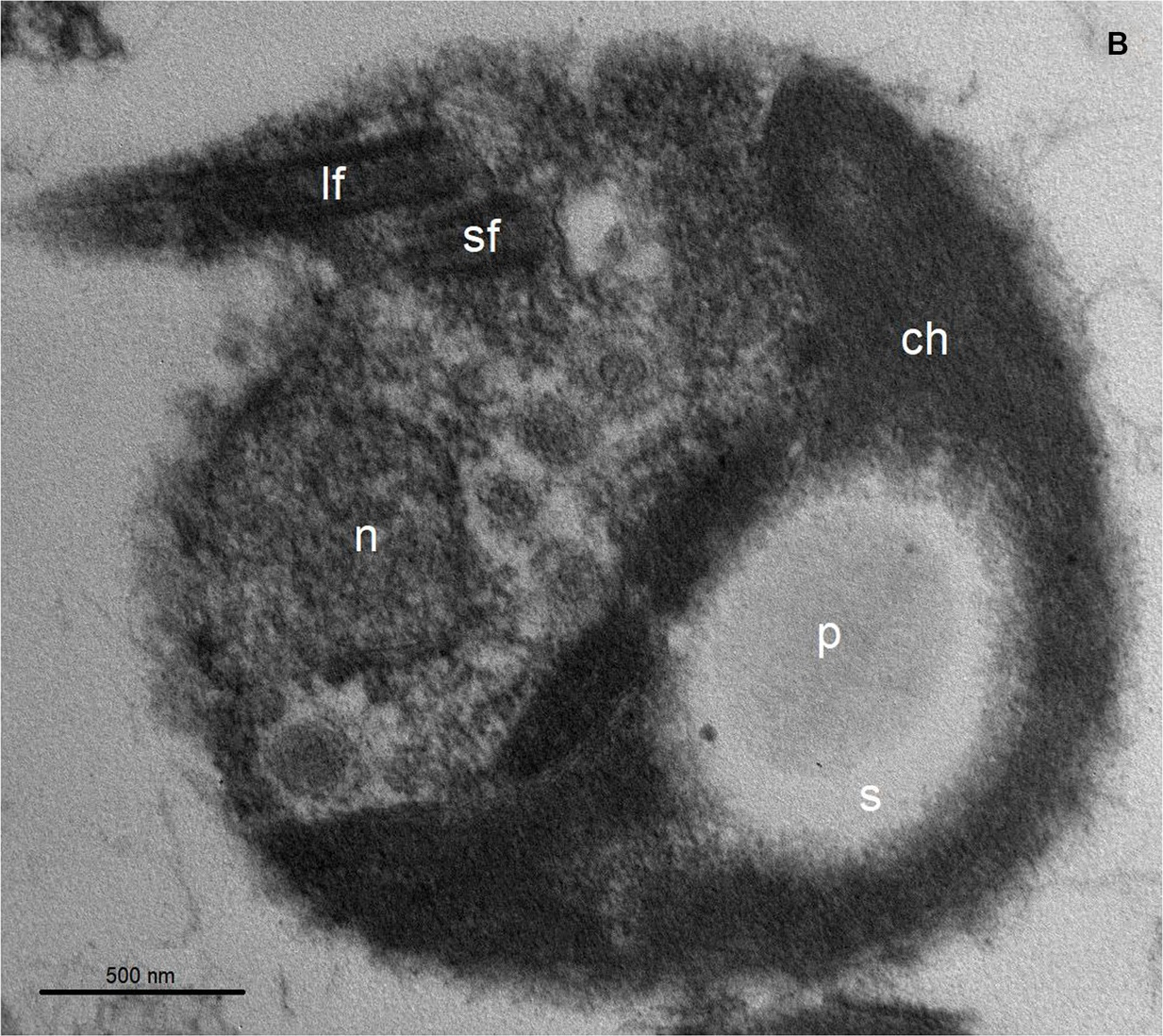
Mantoniella tinhauana (Pedinophyceae)

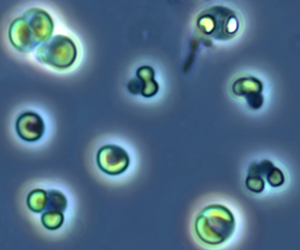
Picocystis salinarum (Picocystophyceae)

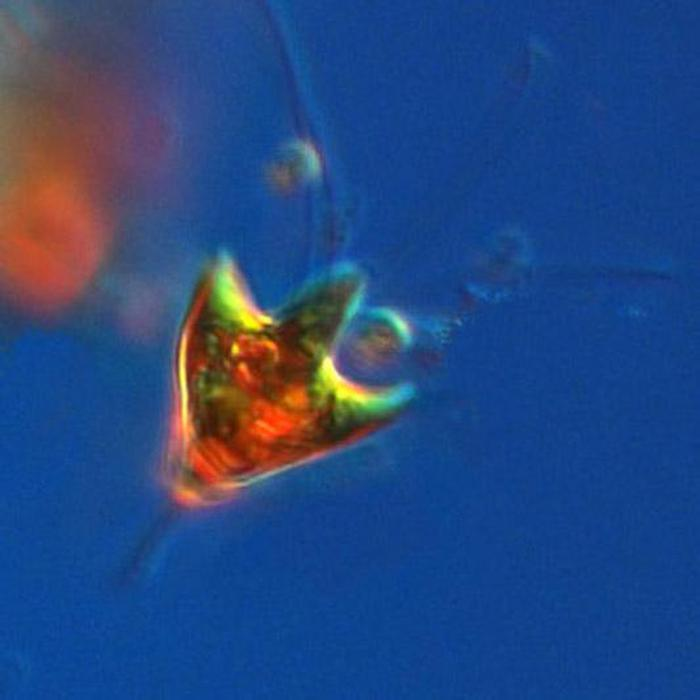
Pyramimonas longicauda (Pyramimonadophyceae)

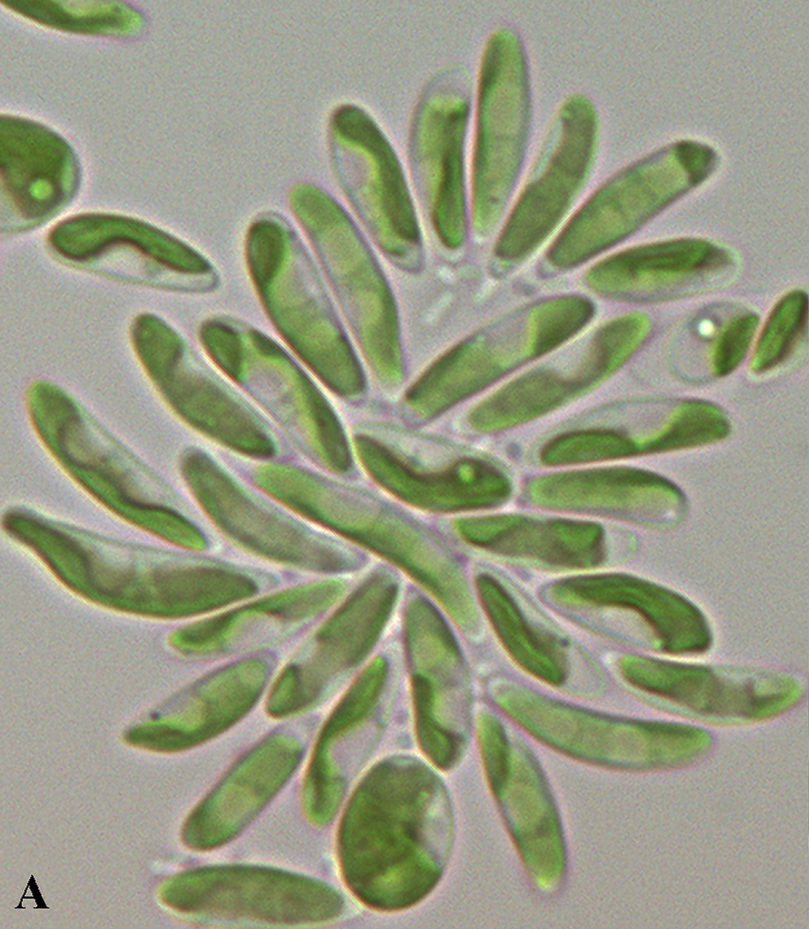
Coccomyxa polymorpha (Trebouxiophyceae)

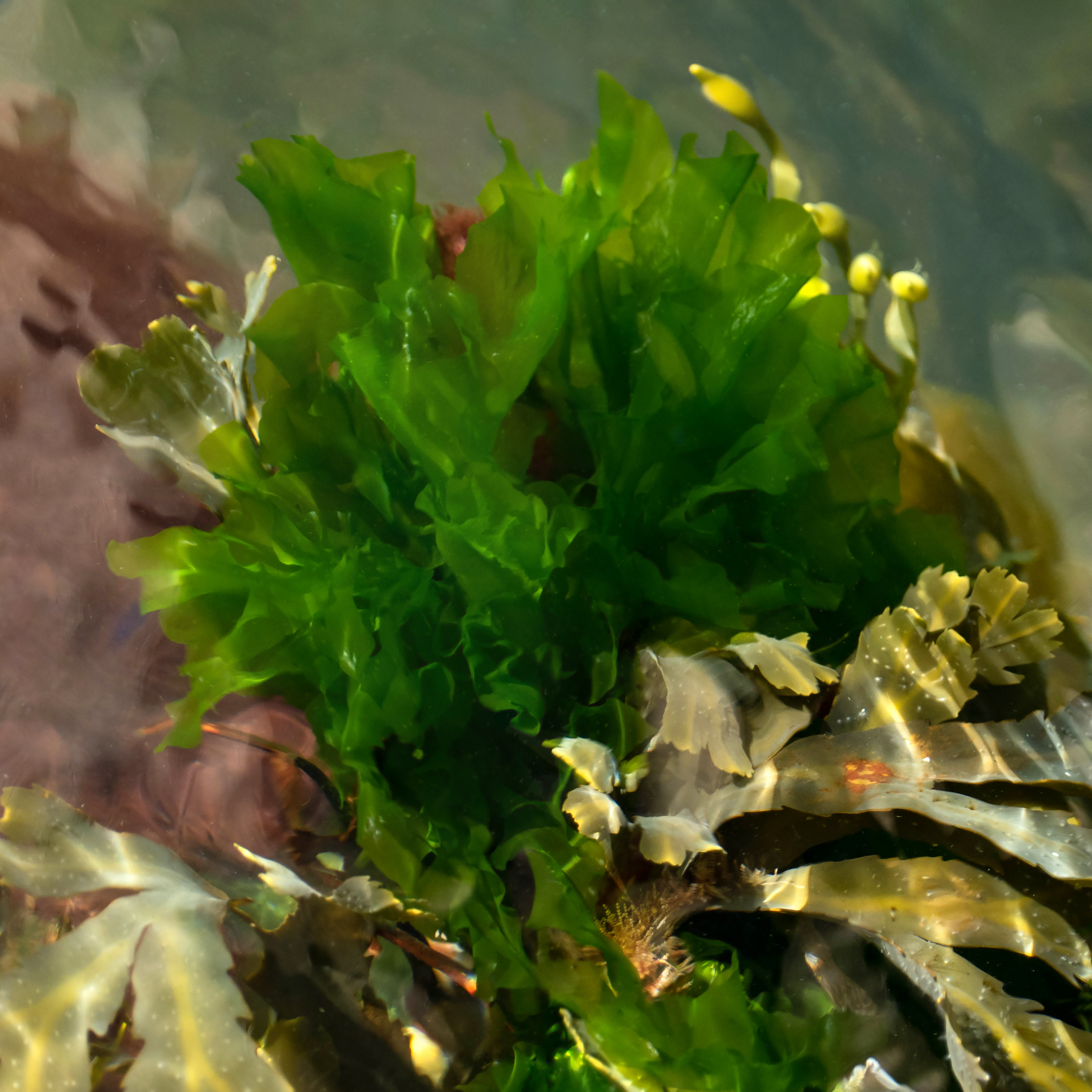
Ulva lactuca
(Ulvophyceae)

Currently eleven chlorophyte classes are accepted, here presented in alphabetical order with some of their characteristics and biodiversity:

- Chlorodendrophyceae (60 species, 15 extinct): unicellular flagellates (monadoids) surrounded by an outer cell covering or theca of organic extracellular scales composed of proteins and ketosugars. Some of these scales make up hair-like structures. Capable of asexual reproduction through cell division inside the theca. No sexual reproduction has been described. Each cell contains a single chloroplast and exhibits two flagella. Present in marine and freshwater habitats.
- Chlorophyceae (3,974 species): either unicellular monadoids (flagellated) or coccoids (without flagella) living solitary or in varied colonial forms (including coenobial), or multicellular filamentous (branch-like) thalli that may be ramified, or foliose (leaf-like) thalli. Cells are surrounded by a crystalline covering composed of glycoproteins abundant in glycine and hydroxyproline, as well as pectins, arabinogalactan proteins, and extensin. They exhibit a haplontic life cycle with isogamy, anisogamy or oogamy. They are capable of asexual reproduction through flagellated zoospores, aplanospores, or autospores. Each cell contains a single chloroplast, a variable number of pyrenoids (including lack thereof), and from one to hundreds of flagella without mastigonemes. Present in marine, freshwater and terrestrial habitats.
- Chloropicophyceae (8 species): unicellular solitary coccoids. Cells are surrounded by a multi-layered cell wall. No sexual or asexual reproduction has been described. Each cell contains a single chloroplast with astaxanthin and loroxanthin, and lacks pyrenoids or flagella. They are exclusively marine.
- Chuariophyceae (3 extinct species): exclusively fossil group containing carbonaceous megafossils found in Ediacaran rocks, such as Tawuia.
- Mamiellophyceae (25 species): unicellular solitary monadoids. Cells are naked or covered by one or two layers of flat scales, mainly with spiderweb-like or reticulate ornamentation. Each cell contains one or rarely two chloroplasts, almost always with prasinoxanthin; two equal or unequal flagella, or just one flagellum, or lacking any flagella. If flagella are present, they can be either smooth or covered in scales in the same manner as the cells. Present in marine and freshwater habitats.
- Nephroselmidophyceae (29 species): unicellular monadoids. Cells are covered by scales. They are capable of sexual reproduction through hologamy (fusion of entire cells), and of asexual reproduction through binary fission. Each cell contains a single chloroplast, a pyrenoid, and two flagella covered by scales. Present in marine and freshwater habitats.
- Pedinophyceae (24 species): unicellular asymmetrical monadoids that undergo a coccoid palmelloid phase covered by mucilage. Cells lack extracellular scales, but in rare cases are covered on the posterior side by a theca. Each cell contains a single chloroplast, a pyrenoid, and a single flagellum usually covered in mastigonemes. Present in marine, freshwater and terrestrial habitats.
- Picocystophyceae (1 species): unicellular coccoids, ovoid and trilobed in shape. Cells are surrounded by a multi-layered cell wall of poly-arabinose, mannose, galactose and glucose. No sexual reproduction has been described. They are capable of asexual reproduction through autosporulation, resulting in two or rarely four daughter cells. Each cell contains a single bilobed chloroplast with diatoxanthin and monadoxanthin, without any pyrenoid or flagella. Present in saline lakes.
- Pyramimonadophyceae (166 species, 59 extinct): unicellular monadoids or coccoids. Cells are covered by two or more layers of organic scales. No sexual reproduction has been described, but some cells with only one flagellum have been interpreted as potential gametes. Asexual reproduction has only been observed in the coccoid forms, via zoospores. Each cell contains a single chloroplast, a pyrenoid, and between 4 and 16 flagella. The flagella are covered in at least two layers of organic scales: a bottom layer of pentagonal scales organized in 24 rows, and a top layer of limuloid scales distributed in 11 rows. They are exclusively marine.
- Trebouxiophyceae (926 species, 1 extinct): unicellular monadoids occasionally without flagella, or colonial, or ramified filamentous thalli, or living as the photobionts of lichen. Cells are covered by a cell wall of cellulose, algaenans, and β-galactofuranane. No sexual reproduction has been described with the exception of some observations of gamete fusion and presence of meiotic genes. They are capable of asexual reproduction through autospores or zoospores. Each cell contains a single chloroplast, a pyrenoid, and one or two pairs of smooth flagella. They are present in marine, freshwater and terrestrial habitats.
- Ulvophyceae (2,695 species, 990 extinct): macroscopic thalli, either filamentous (which may be ramified) or foliose (composed of monostromatic or distromatic layers) or even compact tubular forms, generally multinucleate. Cells surrounded by a cell wall that may be calcified, composed of cellulose, β-manane, β-xilane, sulphated or piruvilated polysaccharides or sulphated ramnogalacturonanes, arabinogalactan proteins, and extensin. They exhibit a haplodiplontic life cycle where the alternating generations can be isomorphic or heteromorphic. They reproduce asexually via zoospores that may be covered in scales. Each cell contains a single chloroplast, and one or two pairs of flagella without mastigonemes but covered in scales. They are present in marine, freshwater and terrestrial habitats.

== Evolution ==
In February 2020, the fossilized remains of a green alga, named Proterocladus antiquus were discovered in the northern province of Liaoning, China. At around a billion years old, it is believed to be one of the oldest examples of a multicellular chlorophyte. It is currently classified as a member of order Siphonocladales, class Ulvophyceae. In 2023, a study calculated the molecular age of green algae as calibrated by this fossil. The study estimated the origin of Chlorophyta within the Mesoproterozoic era, at around 2.04–1.23 billion years ago.

== Usage ==
=== Model organisms ===
Among chlorophytes, a small group known as the volvocine green algae is being researched to understand the origins of cell differentiation and multicellularity. In particular, the unicellular flagellate Chlamydomonas reinhardtii and the colonial organism Volvox carteri are object of interest due to sharing homologous genes that in Volvox are directly involved in the development of two different cell types with full division of labor between swimming and reproduction, whereas in Chlamydomonas only one cell type exists that can function as a gamete. Other volvocine species, with intermediate characters between these two, are studied to further understand the transition towards the cellular division of labor, namely Gonium pectorale, Pandorina morum, Eudorina elegans and Pleodorina starrii.

=== Industrial uses ===
Chlorophyte microalgae are a valuable source of biofuel and various chemicals and products in industrial amounts, such as carotenoids, vitamins and unsaturated fatty acids. The genus Botryococcus is an efficient producer of hydrocarbons, which are converted into biodiesel. Various genera (Chlorella, Scenedesmus, Haematococcus, Dunaliella and Tetraselmis) are used as cellular factories of biomass, lipids and different vitamins for either human or animal consumption, and even for usage as pharmaceuticals. Some of their pigments are employed for cosmetics.
