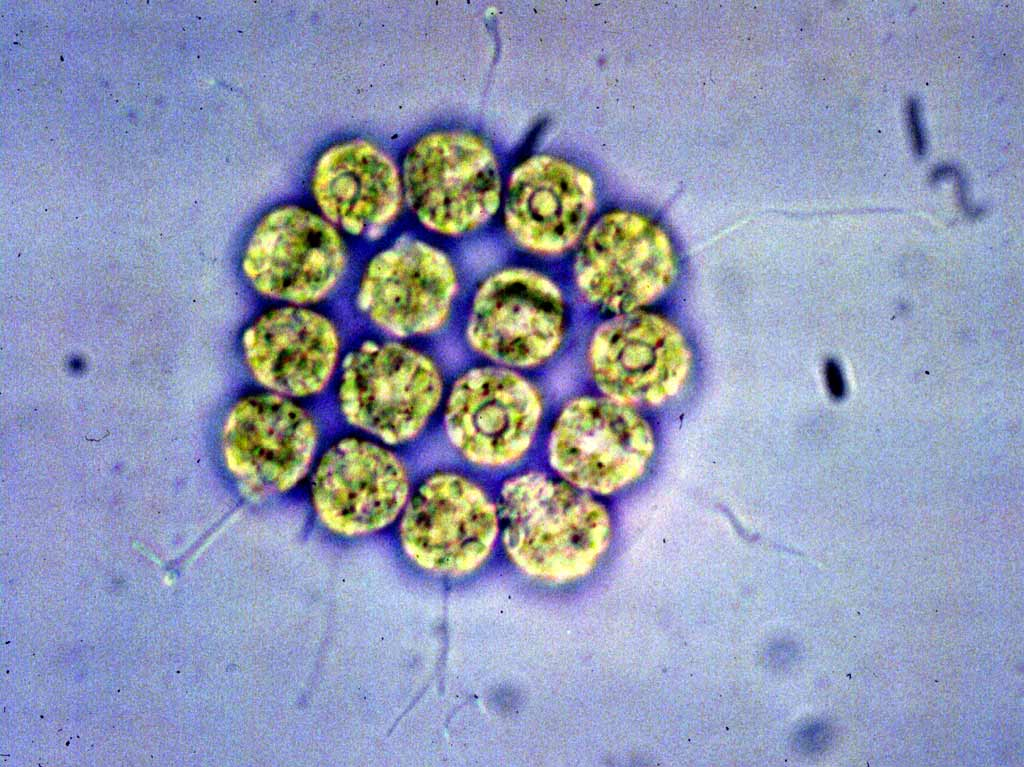
- Gonium pectorale

Scientific classification
- Domain: Eukaryota
- Supergroup: Archaeplastida
- Clade: Viridiplantae
- Division: Chlorophyta
- Class: Chlorophyceae
- Order: Chlamydomonadales
- Family: Goniaceae
- Genus: Gonium; O. F. Muller, 1773

Species
- Gonium angulatum Lemmermann; Gonium compactum M.O.P.Iyengar; Gonium discoideum Prescott; Gonium dispersum Batko & Jakubiec; Gonium formosum Pascher; Gonium indicum M.O.P.Iyengar; Gonium maiaprilis Hayama, Nakada, Hamiji & Nozaki; Gonium multicoccum Pocock; Gonium octonarium Pocock; Gonium pectorale O.F.Müller; Gonium viridistellatum M.Watanabe

= Gonium =

Genus of algae

Gonium colony of 16 cells at nominal magnification of 450x.

Gonium (Greek: γωνία gonia, "angle" or "corner") is a genus of colonial green algae, a member of the order Chlamydomonadales. The genus was first described by Otto Friedrich Müller in 1773, and is among the most common types of algae found in freshwater habitats. It has a cosmopolitan distribution.

Typical colonies of Gonium consist of 4 to 16 cells arranged in a flat plate. Gonium is capable of both asexual and sexual reproduction. Along with other algae such as Volvox, Eudorina and Chlamydomonas, it is a model organism for studying the origins and evolution of multicellularity.

== Description ==
Gonium consists of flat, planar colonies of four to 32 cells, all identical with the colony having no anterior-posterior differentiation. In one species Gonium dispersum, single cells may also be found. In a colony of 16 cells, four are in the center, and the other 12 are on the four sides, three each. A description by G.M. Smith (1920, p. 94):

Gonium Mueller 1773: Colonies of 4-8-16 cells arranged in a flat quadrangular plate and embedded in a common gelatinous matrix or connected by broad gelatinous strands. Cells ovoid to pyriform, with a single cup-shaped chloroplast containing one pyrenoid. Each cell with two cilia of equal length, contractile vacuoles at the base of the cilia, and an eyespot. Four- and eight-celled colonies with the cilia on the same side; sixteen-celled colonies with the four central cells having their cilia on the same side and the twelve marginal cells with radially arranged cilia.

Asexual reproduction by simultaneous division of all cells in the colony to form autocolonies, or by a formation of 2-4 zoospores in each cell.

Sexual reproduction isogamous, by a fusion of biciliate zoogametes.

== Life cycle ==
Gonium being evolutionarily related to Chlamydomonas has a life cycle that is derivative of that of Chlamydomonas. Gonium cells grow asexually as colonies of either 4, 8 or 16 colonial cells. Cell and colony growth of Gonium is uncoupled from cell division just like Chlamydomonas and each cell within the colony divides by multiple-fission. Thus, each cell within the colony will divide 2, 3 or 4 times, thus producing 2^{"n"} daughter cells, or 4, 8 or 16 cells within the colony. Unlike Chlamydomonas where each of the daughter cells separate from each other, Gonium daughter cells remain attached to each other in their ECM.

The sexual cycle of Gonium is also very similar to that of Chlamydomonas. The sexual program of Gonium is induced by nitrogen deprivation where each vegetative cell within the colony differentiates in gametes. Gonium gametes are isogamous, or equal-sized, and unicellular. Thus unicellular Gonium gametes break apart from the multicellular colonies when the sexual program is initiated. Also like Chlamydomonas, there are two "sexes", plus or minus controlled by a genes homologous to those found in Chlamydomonas and Volvox.

== Evolution ==
The genus Gonium represents species closely related to single celled Chlamydomonas and multicellular differentiated Volvox. The order Volvocales has long been a well recognized model system for the study of multicellular evolution. Gonium and the family Tetrabaenaceae contain species representative of colony formation among unicells. Gonium's morphology of colonies of alike cells suggest it is more genetically similar to Chlamydomonas than Volvox, a fact confirmed by phylogenetic analysis.

The Volvocales have been hypothesized to have evolved in twelve discrete steps. Gonium represents the first six evolutionary steps of multicellularity; (1) incomplete cytokinesis, (2) partial inversion, (3) rotation of the basal bodies, (4) organismal polarity, (5) transformation of the cell wall into extra-cellular matrix (ECM), (6) genetic control of cell number. Although the exact order and progression through David Kirk's twelve steps of multicellular evolution are probably not necessarily linear and each occurs more dynamically than originally thought.

== Taxonomy ==
Gonium is the type genus of the family Goniaceae, which includes one other genus, Astrephomene. The two genera are characterized by having similar extracellular matrix ultrastructure. The similar genera Tetrabaena and Basichlamys were previously included in Gonium. These genera differ in reproductive and vegetative characters, such as only producing four-celled colonies.

Species of Gonium are distinguished based on morphological characters, such as the typical number of cells in a colony, shape of cells and their extracellular matrix, number of pyrenoids, and arrangement of cells within the colony.

The following is a phylogeny based on the ITS region of nuclear ribosomal DNA (not all species are included):

- - - - - G. pectorale
        - G. maiaprilis
      - G. octonarium
    - G. quadratum
  - G. multicoccum
  - G. viridistellatum
