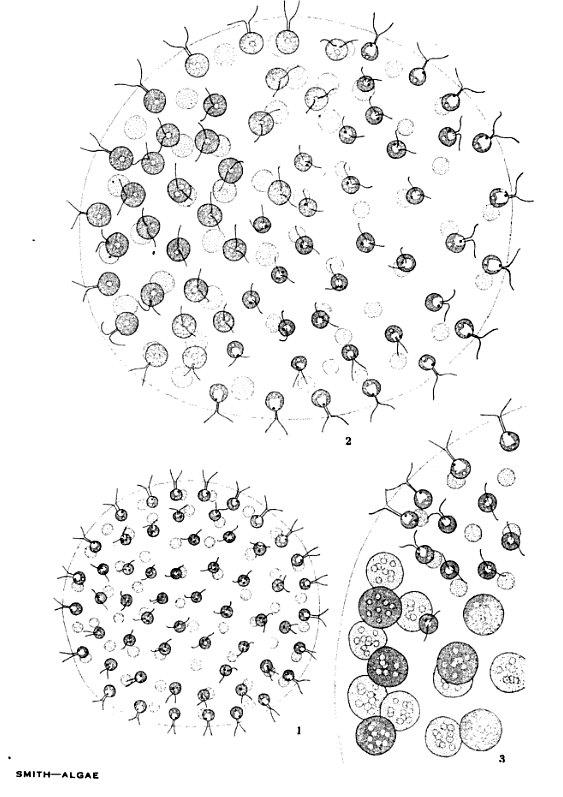
- Pleodorina californica (GM Smith, 1920, plate 57, p 97.)

Scientific classification
- Kingdom: Plantae
- Division: Chlorophyta
- Class: Chlorophyceae
- Order: Chlamydomonadales
- Family: Volvocaceae
- Genus: Pleodorina; W.R.Shaw

Type species
- Pleodorina californica W.R.Shaw

Species
- Pleodorina californica; Pleodorina illinoisiensis; Pleodorina indica; Pleodorina japonica; Pleodorina sphaerica; Pleodorina starrii; Pleodorina thompsonii

= Pleodorina =

Genus of algae

Pleodorina is a genus of colonial green algae in the family Volvocaceae. It occurs in freshwater habitats and has a cosmopolitan distribution.

== Description ==
Pleodorina consists of motile colonies of 32 to 128 cells, which are arranged in the periphery of a gelatinous matrix, forming a hollow sphere. Cells are differentiated into those that are purely vegetative in character (somatic cells) and those capable of dividing to form daughter colonies (reproductive cells). Somatic cells are smaller than reproductive cells and are located in the anterior part of the colony, while reproductive cells occupy the rest of the colony. In one species Pleodorina sphaerica, somatic cells are also randomly distributed amongst reproductive cells. In some species, individual cells are surrounded by a gelatinous sheath. All cells are biflagellate (with two equal flagella), and have a cup-shaped chloroplast, an stigma, many contractile vacuoles, and one to many pyrenoids.

The young colonies of Pleodorina look very much like those of Eudorina.

Asexual reproduction occurs by autocolony formation, in which the reproductive cells undergo successive cell divisions to become a curved plate or plakea, which inverts to form a daughter colony. Sexual reproduction is anisogamous, where reproductive cells either successively divide into sperm packets or female gametes without cell division.

== Taxonomy ==
Morphologically and reproductively, Pleodorina and Eudorina are similar to each other; in the past, some authors considered Pleodorina to be a synonym of the latter. In addition, the boundary between the two genera are blurred by species such as Eudorina illinoisensis (once classified as Pleodorina sphaerica). E. illinoisensis has four anterior cells that are smaller than the rest of the cells, and are facultatively somatic. Currently, Pleodorina is distinguished by having obligately somatic cells, while in Eudorina these obligately somatic cells are absent.

Within Pleodorina, species are distinguished by morphological characters such as the number of cells, position of the somatic cells, percentage of cells which are somatic, whether or not there is a gradual increase in cell size from anterior to posterior, and the presence or absence of gelatinous sheaths surrounding individual cells. The presence of gelatinous sheaths is generally only visible after staining with a dye such as methylene blue.

== Phylogeny ==
Molecular phylogenetic studies show that Pleodorina is polyphyletic and consist of three clades, nested within Eudorina:

- - Eudorina minodii + Eudorina elegans pro parte + Eudorina compacta
  - - Pleodorina thompsonii
    - - Eudorina unicocca + Eudorina peripheralis
      - Eudorina cylindrica + Eudorina illinoisensis + Eudorina elegans pro parte
      - - Pleodorina starrii + Pleodorina indica
        - - Eudorina elegans pro parte
          - Volvox sect. Besseyosphaera
  - - - Volvox aureus
      - - Pleodorina sphaerica
        - - Pleodorina japonica
          - Pleodorina californica
    - Volvox sect. Merrillosphaera
