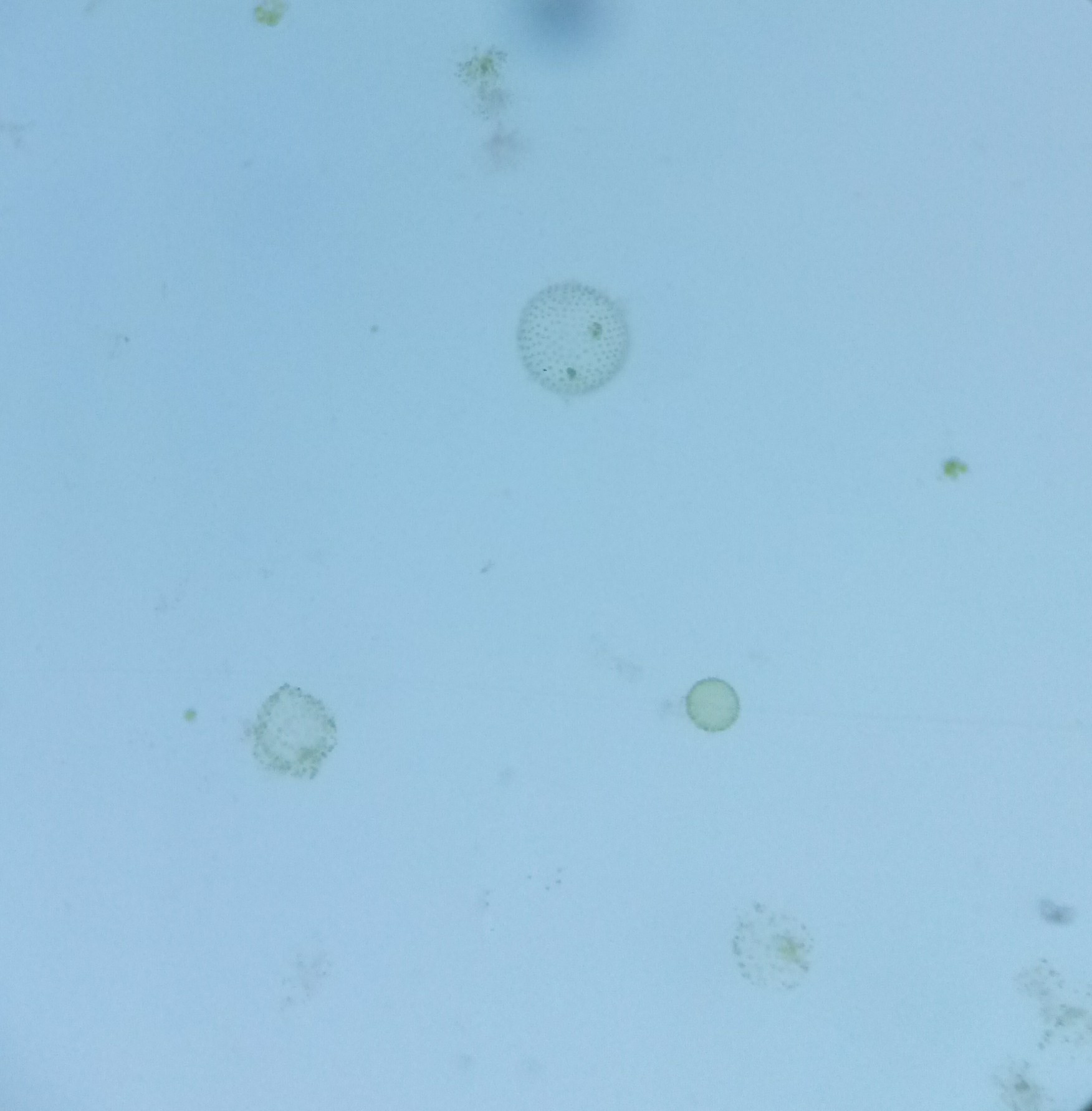

Scientific classification
- Kingdom: Plantae
- Division: Chlorophyta
- Class: Chlorophyceae
- Order: Chlamydomonadales
- Family: Volvocaceae
- Genus: Volvox
- Species: V. globator

Binomial name
- Volvox globator L.

= Volvox globator =

Species of alga

Volvox globator is a species of green algae in the family Volvocaceae. The type species of Volvox, the name was originally given by Carl Linnaeus in his 1758 work Systema Naturae. In 1856 its sexuality was described by Ferdinand Cohn and is the same as Sphaeroplea annulina. It is a freshwater alga with a cosmopolitan distribution.

== Description ==
Volvox globator is a colony of bi-flagellated cells; mature colonies are 400–575 μm long and 380–540 μm wide. The colony consists of thousands of somatic cells arranged in a single peripheral layer embedded in a gelatinous matrix, forming a hollow sphere. Each cell is pyriform in side view, connected to each other by cytoplasmic strands, making them appear stellate in polar view. Each individual cell is surrounded by a gelatinous sheath. Cells have two to six contractile vacuoles, a parietal chloroplast with several minute pyrenoids, a small red stigma. Nutrition is holophytic.

=== Reproduction ===
Asexual colonies are usually filled with three to 17 (usually four to seven) gonidia irregularly distributed in the posterior of the colony. Gonidia are 10–13 μm in diameter; these divide by binary fission to become embryos. After the cells in the embryo finish dividing, they undergo colony inversion; that is, the embryo turns itself inside out, so that the flagella are correctly oriented outwards. In Volvox globator, the posterior of the embryo first pushes inwards, then the anterior pole of the embryo produces an opening (called a phialopore), allowing the embryo to invert. This method of inversion is called Type B inversion, in contrast to the more well-studied Type A inversion in Volvox carteri. Mature embryos are up to 250 μm in diameter.

Sexual reproduction is homothallic, with sexual colonies around the same size as asexual ones. Sexual colonies contain three to seven antheridial (sperm) packets and 11–72 (typically 20–30) eggs. The sperm packets are compressed globoids about 22–32 μm, and divide to form 256 antherozoids (sperm). The zygotes are round and covered with straight, blunt spines; they are 36–44 μm (with spines, 45–54 μm).

== Movement ==
Volvox globator has been used as a model organism for a over a century, to study cellular motion. Volvox colonies tend to swim towards the direction of light.

== Taxonomy ==
As the type species of Volvox, it is placed in Volvox sect. Volvox (also known as Euvolvox). This section is characterized by having cells with thick cytoplasmic connections between each other, making the cells appear stellate, and having spiny zygotes. Within section Volvox, species are separated based on monoicy/dioicy, number of eggs and sperm packets per spheroid, and zygote morphology.
