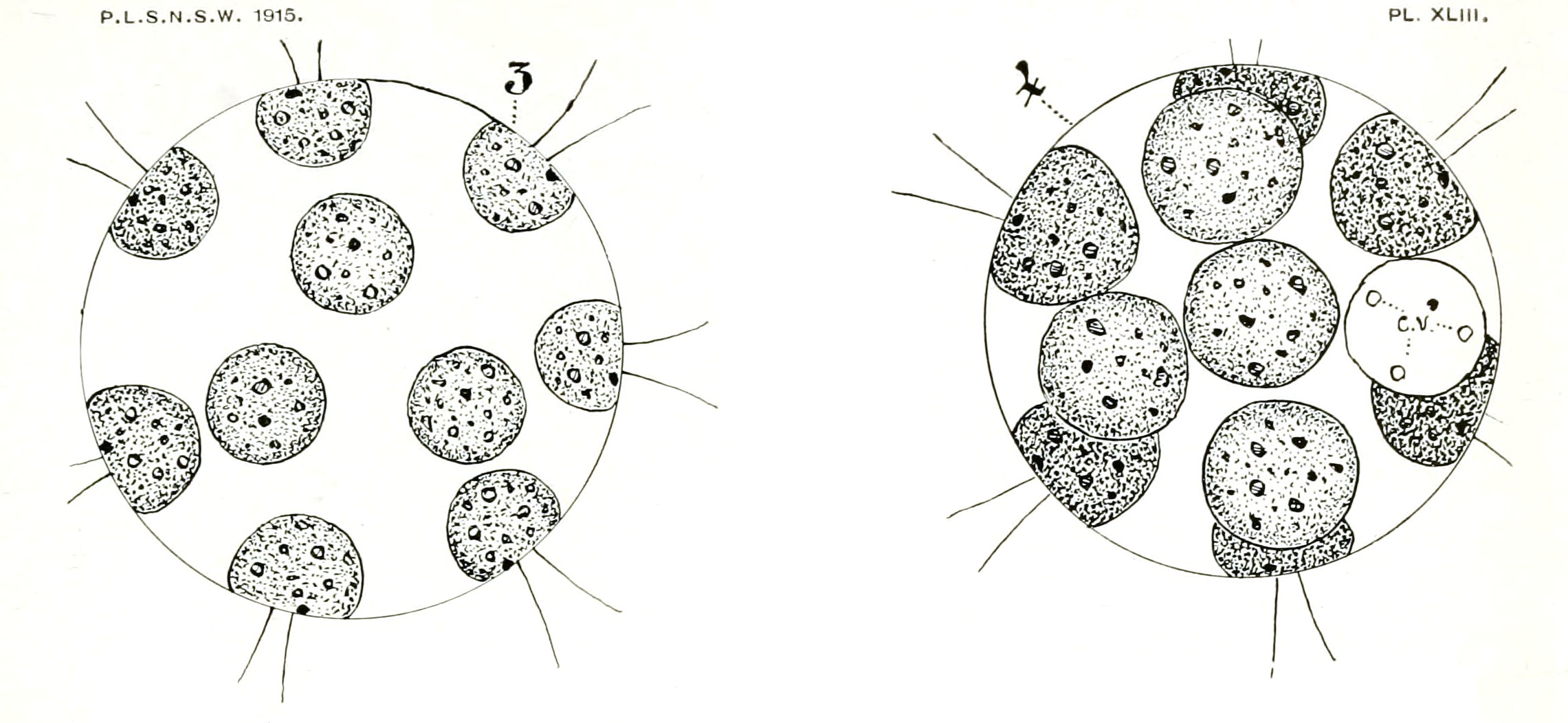
- Volvulina steinii

Scientific classification
- Kingdom: Plantae
- Division: Chlorophyta
- Class: Chlorophyceae
- Order: Chlamydomonadales
- Family: Volvocaceae
- Genus: Volvulina; Playfair

Type species
- Volvulina steinii Playfair

Species
- Volvulina compacta; Volvulina pringsheimii; Volvulina steinii

= Volvulina =

Genus of algae

Volvulina is a genus of colonial green algae in the family Volvocaceae. It is cosmopolitan, but rare.

== Description ==
Volvulina is a multicellular organism. The colony, termed a coenobium, is broadly ellipsoidal or spherical and consists of a fixed number of cells, usually 16 in mature individuals (rarely 4, 8 or 32). The cells are located at periphery of the coenobium and separated from each other by being embedded in a gelatinous matrix. The cell body is lens-shaped or hemispherical when mature, with two equal flagella. The chloroplast is dish- or bowl-shaped. Pyrenoids may be absent or present (located at the base of the chloroplast); eyespots are present, with eyespots in anterior cells larger than those in posterior cells. The nucleus is centrally located and there may be two contractile vacuoles at the base of each flagella, or several scattered contractile vacuoles.

Volvulina reproduces both asexually and sexually. In asexual reproduction, each cell of the colony develops into a daughter colony through successive cell divisions, and then subsequent colony inversion. Sexual reproduction is isogamous.

== Species ==
Three species of Volvulina are well-characterized: Volvulina steinii, Volvulina pringsheimii, and Volvulina compacta. The three species differ from each other in morphology, namely: the shape of the cells and whether they are contiguous, and the presence or location of pyrenoids. In addition to these three species, there is also Volvulina playferiana which is poorly described and may be an immature form of V. steinii, and Volvulina boldii which is a nomen nudum.

== Phylogeny ==
Molecular phylogenetic studies show that Volvulina is paraphyletic with respect to Pandorina:

- - Platydorina + Colemanosphaera (outgroup)
  - - Volvulina steinii
    - - - "Volvulina boldii"
        - Pandorina colemaniae
      - Pandorina morum
      - - Volvulina compacta pro parte
        - - Volvulina compacta pro parte
          - Volvulina pringsheimii
