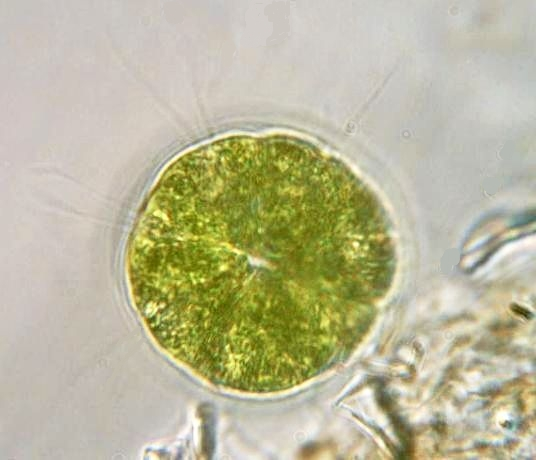
- Pandorina sp.

Scientific classification
- Clade: Viridiplantae
- Division: Chlorophyta
- Class: Chlorophyceae
- Order: Chlamydomonadales
- Family: Volvocaceae
- Genus: Pandorina; Bory de Saint-Vincent, 1824

Type species
- Pandorina morum (O.F.Müller) Bory

Species
- Pandorina colemaniae; Pandorina cylindrica; Pandorina morum; Pandorina smithii

= Pandorina =

Genus of algae

Pandorina is a genus of green algae in the family Volvocaceae. It is a common freshwater genus, and has a cosmopolitan distribution. Along with other algae such as Volvox, Eudorina and Chlamydomonas, it is a model organism for studying the origins and evolution of multicellularity.

== Description ==
Pandorina is composed of 8, 16, or sometimes 32 cells, held together at their bases to form a globular or ellipsoidal colony surrounded by mucilage. The cells are ovoid or slightly narrowed at one end to appear keystone- or pear-shaped. Each cell has two flagella with two contractile vacuoles at its base, an eyespot, and a large cup-shaped chloroplast with at least one pyrenoid. The colonies co-ordinate their flagellar movement to create a rolling, swimming motion. Pandorina shows the beginnings of the colony polarity and differentiation seen in Volvox, with anterior cells having larger eyespots.

Asexual reproduction is by simultaneous division of all cells of the colony to form autocolonies that are liberated by a gelatinization of the colonial envelope. Sexual reproduction occurs by division of each cell of the colony into 16-32 zoogametes. Sexual reproduction is isogamous.

== Taxonomy ==
The taxonomy of Pandorina and Eudorina have been confused because the original description was insufficient to distinguish the two genera. In addition, some species appear to be intermediate in morphology between the two, and have at times been considered part of either genus, such as Pandorina/Eudorina charkowiensis. Currently, these intermediate taxa are placed in two genera, Colemanosphaera and Yamagishiella. Therefore, the genera are separated as follows:

- Pandorina: two contractile vacuoles at the base of the flagella; one or multiple pyrenoids; sexual reproduction isogamous; no cellular envelope around each individual cell.
- Colemanosphaera: two or three contractile vacuoles at the base of the flagella; multiple pyrenoids in a mature cell; sexual reproduction anisogamous, with fertilization happening outside of the female spheroid; cellular envelope around each individual cell.
- Yamagishiella: two contractile vacuoles at the base of the flagella; single basal pyrenoid; sexual reproduction isogamous; cellular envelope around each individual cell.
- Eudorina: two apical contractile vacuoles and multiple contractile vacuoles scattered throughout cell; one basal or multiple pyrenoids; sexual reproduction anisogamous; cellular envelope around each individual cell.

Molecular sequencing has shown that Pandorina is paraphyletic with respect to Volvulina.
