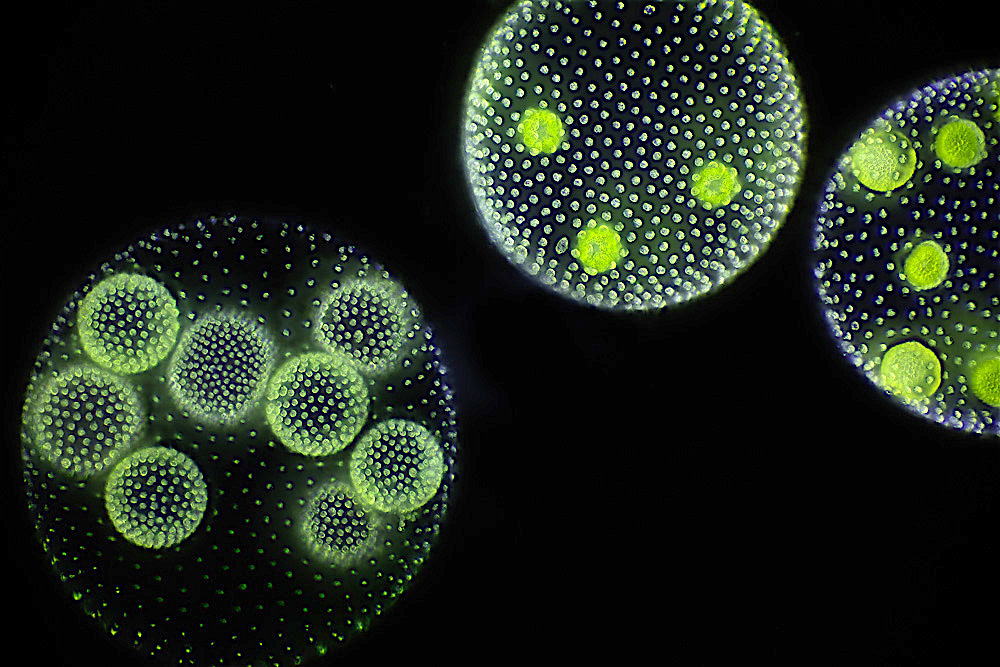
- Volvox sp.

Scientific classification
- Kingdom: Plantae
- Division: Chlorophyta
- Class: Chlorophyceae
- Order: Chlamydomonadales
- Family: Volvocaceae
- Genus: Volvox; L.

Type species
- Volvox globator L.

Sections
- See § Taxonomy

Synonyms
- Besseyosphaera W.R.Shaw; Campbellosphaera W.R.Shaw; Copelandosphaera W.R.Shaw; Janetosphaera W.R.Shaw; Merrillosphaera W.R.Shaw; Sphaerosira Ehrenberg

= Volvox =

Genus of algae

Volvox is a polyphyletic genus of chlorophyte green algae in the family Volvocaceae. Volvox species form spherical colonies of up to 50,000 cells, and for this reason they are sometimes called globe algae. First reported by Antonie van Leeuwenhoek in 1700, it is distinctive and easily identified in the microscope. It occurs in a variety of freshwater habitats and has a widespread, cosmopolitan distribution.

Volvox diverged from unicellular ancestors approximately 200 million years ago. Colonies of Volvox are differentiated into somatic and reproductive cells, and are capable of both sexual and asexual reproduction. Additionally, its close relatives are diverse in body plan and reproductive strategy, ranging from unicellular organisms such as Chlamydomonas to simple colonial organisms such as Pandorina and Eudorina. Because of this, Volvox and its relatives are used as model organisms in the classroom and laboratory to study biological processes such as cellular movement, sexual reproduction, and evolution of multicellularity.

== History of knowledge ==
Antonie van Leeuwenhoek first reported observations of Volvox in 1700. After some drawings and a fuller description by Henry Baker in 1753, Carl Linnaeus named the genus in his 1758 work Systema Naturae; Linnaeus named the genus Volvox, with two species: V. globator and V. chaos. The name comes from the Latin term volvere, meaning "to roll", and -ox, meaning "fierce". Volvox chaos is an amoeba now known as Chaos sp.

Linnaeus' description of Volvox globator was vague enough that it could apply to any of the currently accepted species of Volvox. The current circumscription of V. globator is based on Christian Gottfried Ehrenberg's descriptions; however, he mistakenly thought the asexual and sexual colonies of Volvox were different species, and placed the male colonies in a separate genus, Sphaerosira. This confusion was cleared up by Samuel Friedrich Stein in 1878.

In the twentieth century, W. R. Shaw added several species to Volvox, but also split off many species into several genera, namely Besseyosphaera, Campbellosphaera, Merrillosphaera, Copelandosphaera, and Janetosphaera. Although most systematists did not accept these genera, they did accept them as sections within the genus Volvox; Gilbert Morgan Smith reduced this to four sections in total. More recently, phylogenetic studies revealed that Volvox was polyphyletic, consisting of several clades which partially aligned with the sections as defined by Smith. Therefore, in 2015 Hisayoshi Nozaki and colleagues emended the sections.

== Description ==
Volvox colony: 1) Chlamydomonas-like cell, 2) Daughter colony, 3) Cytoplasmic bridges, 4) Intercellular gel, 5) Reproductive cell, 6) Somatic cell.

Mature colonies of Volvox are composed of hundreds, up to tens of thousands of cells from two differentiated cell types: numerous flagellate somatic cells and a smaller number of germ cells lacking in soma that are embedded in the surface of a hollow sphere or coenobium containing an extracellular matrix made of glycoproteins.

Adult somatic cells compose a single layer with the flagella facing outward, forming a hollow spheroid. The cells swim in a coordinated fashion, with distinct anterior and posterior poles. Each cell is enclosed in a gelatinous sheath, which is either distinct or confluent depending on the species. Cells are ovoid, spherical, or star-shaped, each with two equal flagella. The cells have a cup-shaped chloroplast with a single pyrenoid and an anterior eyespot that enables the colony to swim toward light. The cells of colonies in the more basal Euvolvox clade are interconnected by thin strands of cytoplasm, called protoplasmates. Cell number is specified during development and is dependent on the number of rounds of division.

=== Reproduction ===
Volvox is facultatively sexual and can reproduce both sexually and asexually. In the lab, asexual reproduction is most commonly observed; the relative frequencies of sexual and asexual reproduction in the wild is unknown. The switch from asexual to sexual reproduction can be triggered by environmental conditions and by the production of a sex-inducing pheromone. Desiccation-resistant diploid zygotes are produced following successful fertilization.

An asexual colony includes both somatic (vegetative) cells, which do not reproduce, and large, non-motile gonidia in the interior, which produce new colonies asexually through repeated division. In sexual reproduction two types of gametes are produced. Volvox species can be monoecious or dioecious. Male colonies release numerous sperm packets, while in female colonies single cells enlarge to become oogametes, or eggs.

Kirk and Kirk showed that sex-inducing pheromone production can be triggered in somatic cells by a short heat shock given to asexually growing organisms. The induction of sex by heat shock is mediated by oxidative stress that likely also causes oxidative DNA damage. It has been suggested that switching to the sexual pathway is the key to surviving environmental stresses that include heat and drought. Consistent with this idea, the induction of sex involves a signal transduction pathway that is also induced in Volvox by wounding.

=== Colony inversion ===
Colony inversion is a special characteristic during development in the order Volvocaceae that results in new colonies having their flagella facing outwards. During this process the asexual reproductive cells (gonidia) first undergo successive cell divisions to form a concave-to-cup-shaped embryo or plakea composed of a single cell layer. Immediately after, the cell layer is inside out compared with the adult configuration—the apical ends of the embryo protoplasts from which flagella are formed, are oriented toward the interior of the plakea. Then the embryo undergoes inversion, during which the cell layer inverts to form a spheroidal daughter colony with the apical ends and flagella of daughter protoplasts positioned outside. This process enables appropriate locomotion of spheroidal colonies of the Volvocaceae. The mechanism of inversion has been investigated extensively at the cellular and molecular levels using the model species, Volvox carteri. Another species Volvox globator has a similar mode of colony inversion, but begins at the posterior instead of the anterior.

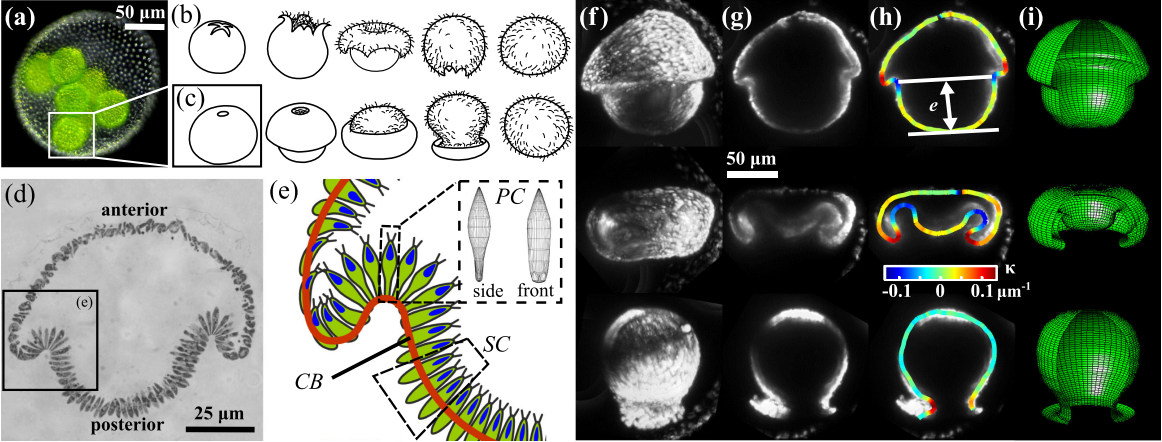
Embryonic inversion in Volvox. (a) Adult V. globator spheroid containing multiple embryos. (b) Embryo undergoing type-A inversion (e.g., V. carteri). (c) Embryo undergoing type-B inversion (e.g., V. globator, V. aureus). (d) Light micrograph shows semi-thin section of V. globator embryo exhibiting different cell shapes. (e) Schematic representation of cells in region marked in (d). PC: paddle-shaped cells, two different views illustrate anisotropic shape; SC: spindle-shaped cells; red line: position of cytoplasmic bridges (CB). (f) 3D renderings of a single V. globator embryo in three successive stages of inversion. (g) Optical midsagittal cross sections of embryo in (f). (h) Traced cell sheet contours overlaid on sections in (g), with color-coded curvature κ. (i) Surfaces of revolution computed from averaged contours.

== Habitats ==
Volvox is a genus of freshwater algae found in ponds and ditches, even in shallow puddles. According to Charles Joseph Chamberlain,

"The most favorable place to look for it is in the deeper ponds, lagoons, and ditches which receive an abundance of rain water. It has been said that where you find Lemna, you are likely to find Volvox; and it is true that such water is favorable, but the shading is unfavorable. Look where you find Sphagnum, Vaucheria, Alisma, Equisetum fluviatile, Utricularia, Typha, and Chara. Dr. Nieuwland reports that Pandorina, Eudorina and Gonium are commonly found as constituents of the green scum on wallows in fields where pigs are kept. The flagellate, Euglena, is often associated with these forms."

== Taxonomy ==
Volvox is divided into four sections, which differ from each other by the morphology of their somatic cells, asexual spheroids and zygotes:

- Volvox sect. Volvox — Cells have coarse cytoplasmic connections between each other and are therefore stellate in polar view. The gonidia are relatively small, less than 15 μm in diameter, and are differentiated late in the development of the colony. Zygotes have spiny walls.
- Volvox sect. Besseyosphaera — Cells have no cytoplasmic connections between each other and are circular in polar view. Asexual spheroids have more than 20 gonidia. Zygotes lack spiny walls.
- Volvox sect. Merrillosphaera (synonyms: sect. Campbellosphaera, sect. Copelandosphaera) — Cells have delicate cytoplasmic connections (or no connections) between each other, and are circular in polar view. Asexual spheroids have less than 20 gonidia. Zygotes lack spiny walls.
- Volvox sect. Janetosphaera — Cells have delicate cytoplasmic connections between each other, and are circular in polar view. They lack distinct gelatinous sheaths surrounding individual cells, instead having a colonial matrix where individual sheaths are fused together. Gelatinous strands also radiate from the center to the inner surface of the colonial matrix.

In practice gelatinous sheaths and delicate cytoplasmic connections are difficult to observe, and are only reliably visible after staining with a dye such as methylene blue.

=== Species ===
Volvox contains the following species, according to AlgaeBase. In addition to these accepted species, there a number of dubious "species" described under the genus Volvox which are amoebae, and/or otherwise do not belong to the current definition of Volvox.

Volvox sect. Besseyosphaera

- Volvox gigas
- Volvox powersii

Volvox sect. Janetosphaera

- Volvox aureus
- Volvox pocockiae

Volvox sect. Merrillosphaera

- Volvox africanus
- Volvox carteri
- Volvox dissipatrix
- Volvox obversus
- Volvox ovalis
- Volvox reticuliferus
- Volvox spermatosphaera
- Volvox tertius
- Volvox zeikusii (Note: Closely related to V. dissipatrix.)

Volvox sect. Volvox

- Volvox amboensis
- Volvox biwakoensis
- Volvox barberi
- Volvox capensis
- Volvox ferrisii
- Volvox globator
- Volvox kirkiorum
- Volvox longispiniferus
- Volvox merrillii
- Volvox perglobator
- Volvox prolificus
- Volvox rousseletii
- Volvox sagami

Unplaced to section

- Volvox fertilis

Although the genus Volvox is easy to identify, species-level identification of Volvox can be difficult. Species are morphologically distinguished based on a variety of characters including zygote morphology, developmental characteristics, and sexual characteristics (e.g. dioicy or monoicy).

== Evolution ==
Volvox is polyphyletic. The section containing the type species, Volvox sect. Volvox, is sister to the rest of the family. Other members of Volvox are dispersed within three clades, all nested within Eudorina.

Ancestors of Volvox transitioned from single cells that initially resembled Chlamydomonas to form multicellular colonies at least 200 million years ago, during the Triassic period. Genera intermediate in morphology, such as Gonium, contain 16 Chlamydomonas-like cells and are thought to represent intermediate stages in evolution. An estimate using DNA sequences from about 45 different species of volvocine green algae, including Volvox, suggests that the transition from single cells to undifferentiated multicellular colonies took about 35 million years.
