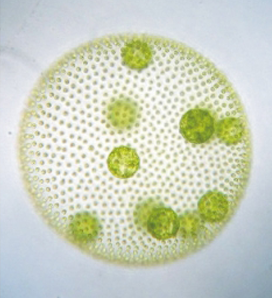

Scientific classification
- Domain: Eukaryota
- Clade: Archaeplastida
- Clade: Viridiplantae
- Division: Chlorophyta
- Class: Chlorophyceae
- Order: Chlamydomonadales
- Family: Volvocaceae
- Genus: Volvox
- Species: V. carteri

Binomial name
- Volvox carteri F.Stein 1878

= Volvox carteri =

Species of alga

Volvox carteri is a species of colonial green algae in the order Volvocales. It is a freshwater species with a wide distribution. The V. carteri life cycle includes a sexual phase and an asexual phase. V. carteri forms small spherical colonies, or coenobia, of 2000–6000 Chlamydomonas-type somatic cells and 12–16 large, potentially immortal reproductive cells called gonidia. While vegetative, male and female colonies are indistinguishable; however, in the sexual phase, females produce 35-45 eggs and males produce up to 50 sperm packets with 64 or 128 sperm each.

The genome of this species of algae was sequenced in 2010. Volvox carteri is a significant model organism for research into the evolution of multicellularity and organismal complexity, largely due to its simple differentiation into two cell types, versatility in controlled laboratory environments, and natural abundance.

== Taxonomy ==
Volvox carteri is placed within section Volvox section Merrillosphaera. In section Merrillosphaera, somatic cells in mature colonies lack cytoplasmic bridges between cells (except for Volvox dissipatrix). Additionally, asexual spheroids have less than 20 gonidia, separating them from the section Besseyosphaera.

Within V. carteri, several forms are distinguished, based on differences in asexual colonies, as well as male and female sexual colonies. One distinctive form, f. kawasakiensis, the male colonies have no somatic cells and only androgonidia (sperm packets).

== Differentiation ==
Volvox carteri is a useful model organism for understanding the evolution and developmental genetics of cellular differentiation, in part because asexual colonies possess only two cell types. Approximately 2000 biflagellated somatic cells form a monolayer at the surface of the extracellular matrix (ECM) and cannot divide, rendering them mortal. They facilitate motility in response to changes in light concentration (phototaxis), which is detected via an orange photoreceptor-containing eyespot. Gonidia, by contrast, are immobile, embedded in the ECM interior, and are potentially immortal due to their ability to divide and participate in reproduction.

Three key genes are known to play significant roles in the somatic-gonidium dichotomy: glsA (gonidialess A); regA (regenerator A); and lag (late gonidia). These genes are believed to carry out germ-soma differentiation during development in a general order:

1. gls specifies cell fate based on size
2. lag genes facilitate gonidial development in large cells
3. reg genes facilitate somatic development in small cells

The glsA gene contributes to asymmetric cell division that results in the designation of large cells that develop into gonidia and small cells that develop into somatic cells. Gls mutants do not experience asymmetric division, a key component for creating gonidia, and thus are composed only of somatic swimming cells.

The lag gene plays a role in specialization of gonidial initials. If mutations disable the lag gene, large cells specified by glsA will develop as somatic cells initially but then de-differentiate to become gonidia.

Determination of somatic cells is controlled by the transcription factor regA. The regA geneencodes a single 80 amino acid-long DNA-binding SAND domain that is expressed in somatic cells after embryonic development. regA acts to prevent division by inhibiting cell growth via downregulation of chloroplast biosynthesis, and represses expression of genes necessary for germ cell formation. Chlamydomonas reinhardtii, a unicellular relative of V. carteri, is known to possess genes related to regA. This suggests that the regA gene originated before proper cellular differentiation in Volvox and was likely present in an undifferentiated ancestor. In this case, the function of regA in V. carteri most likely arose due to changes in expression pattern from a temporal (environmental response) state to a spatial (developmental) state.

== Genomics ==
The V. carteri genome consists of 138 million base pairs and contains c. 14,520 protein-coding genes. Like many other multicellular organisms, this alga has a genome rich in introns; approximately 82% of the genome is non-coding. The V. carteri genome has a GC content of approximately 55.3%.

Over 99% of the volume of a V. carteri colony is made up of a glycoprotein-rich extracellular matrix (ECM). Several genes involved in ECM construction and ECM proteins have been identified in V. carteri. These genes account for the expanded inner layer of the cell wall (ECM) and the count and diversity of genes encoding VMPs (Volvox matrix metalloproteases) and pherophorins (ECM protein families).

Volvox has multiple sex-specific and sex-regulated transcripts, including MAT3, an rb-homologous tumor suppressor that displays evidence of sex-specific selection and whose alternative splicing is sexually regulated.

== Sexual reproduction ==
V. carteri can reproduce both asexually or sexually. Thus, it is a facultatively sexual organism. In nature, Volvox reproduces asexually in temporary ponds in spring, but becomes sexual and produces dormant over-wintering zygotes before the ponds dry up in the summer heat. V. carteri can be induced to reproduce sexually by heat shock treatment. However, this induction can be inhibited by antioxidants indicating that the induction of sex by heat shock is mediated by oxidative stress. It was further found that an inhibitor of the mitochondrial electron transport chain that induces oxidative stress also induced sex in V. carteri. It has been suggested that oxidative DNA damage caused by oxidative stress may be the underlying cause of the induction of sex in their experiments. Other agents that cause DNA damage (i.e. glutaraldehyde, formaldehyde and UV) also induce sex in V. carteri. These findings lend support to the general idea that a principal adaptive function of sex is repair of DNA damages.
