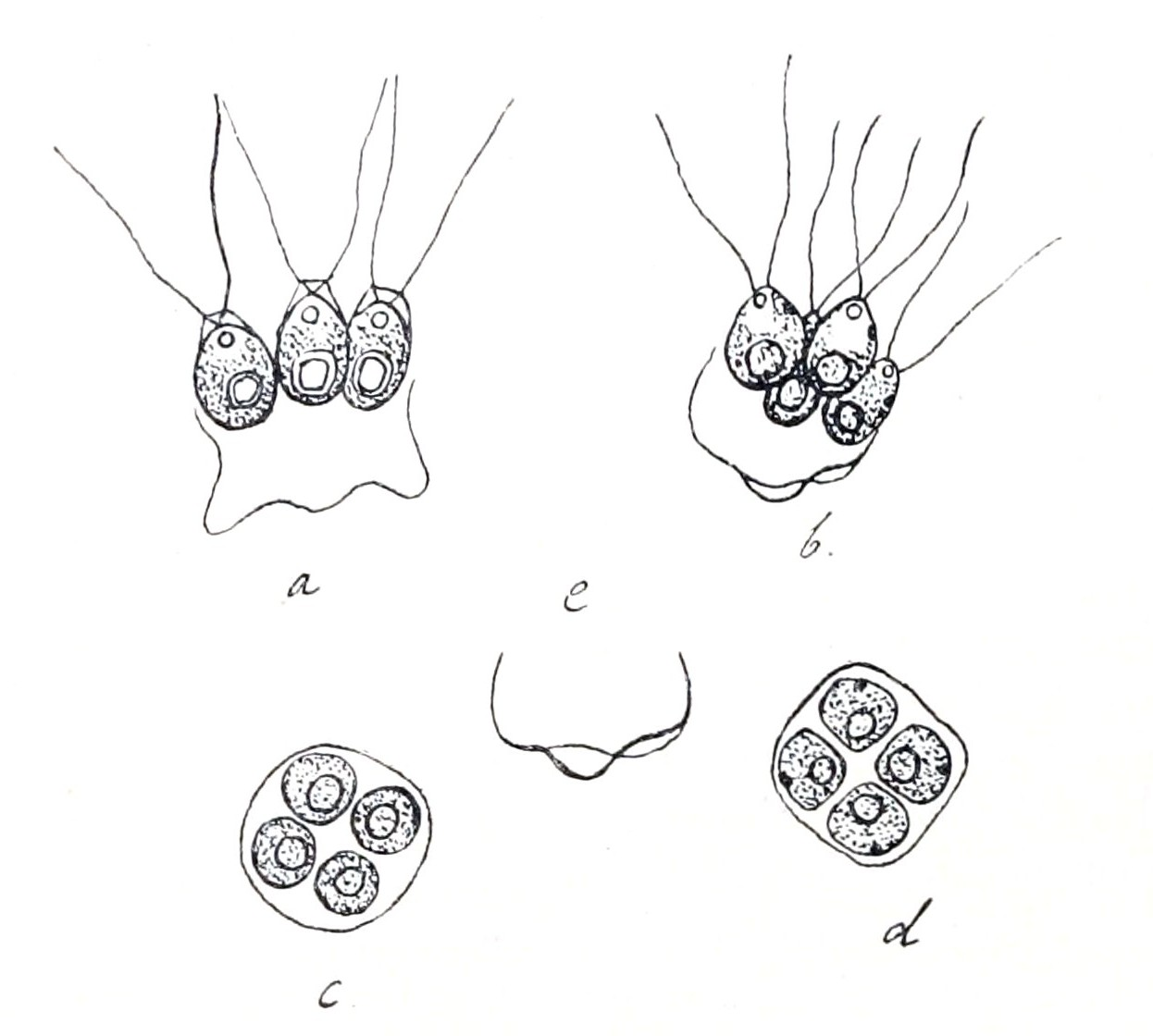
- Basichlamys sacculifera

Scientific classification
- Kingdom: Plantae
- Division: Chlorophyta
- Class: Chlorophyceae
- Order: Chlamydomonadales
- Family: Tetrabaenaceae
- Genus: Basichlamys; Skuja, 1956
- Species: B. sacculifera

Binomial name
- Basichlamys sacculifera (Scherffel) Skuja

Synonyms
- Gonium sacculiferum Scherff.; Gonium sociale f. sacculiferum

= Basichlamys =

Genus of algae

Basichlamys is a monotypic genus of colonial green algae in the family Tetrabaenaceae. The sole species is Basichlamys sacculifera. It is rare, but cosmopolitan in freshwaters.

Basichlamys sacculifera consists of four-celled colonies of cells in a square, which are attached by their bases to a parental cellular sheath or sac. The cells are ovoid and asymmetrical, and each have two flagella, two contractile vacuoles, and a cup-shaped chloroplast containing a pyrenoid and a stigma. The ultrastructure of the cell wall is similar to those of Tetrabaena and Gonium. Its overall morphology is most similar to Tetrabaena, but the cells are not connected to each other directly but are instead connected by a common cellular sheath.

Asexual reproduction occurs by autocolony formation, or occasionally akinetes or hypnospores (dormant cells). Sexual reproduction is isogamous and results in walled aplanozygotes. The zygote walls are reticulate, a feature that it shares with Tetrabaena.
