= CEP104 =

Protein-coding gene in humans

Identifiers
- Aliases: CEP104, GlyBP, KIAA0562, CFAP256, JBTS25, ROC22, centrosomal protein 104
- External IDs: OMIM: 616690; MGI: 2687282; GeneCards: CEP104

Gene location (Human)
Chr.	Chromosome 1 (human)
Band	1p36.32	Start	3,812,081 bp
Band	1p36.32	End	3,857,214 bp

Gene location (Mouse)
Chr.	Chromosome 4 (mouse)
Band	4|4 E2	Start	154,059,651 bp
Band	4|4 E2	End	154,093,189 bp
RNA expression pattern
Bgee	Human / Mouse (ortholog); Top expressed in: secondary oocyte; buccal mucosa cell; sperm; internal globus pallidus; saphenous vein; inferior ganglion of vagus nerve; islet of Langerhans; lactiferous duct; sural nerve; stromal cell of endometrium / Top expressed in: olfactory epithelium; muscle of thigh; zygote; digastric muscle; triceps brachii muscle; temporal muscle; sternocleidomastoid muscle; skeletal muscle tissue; extraocular muscle; secondary oocyte; More reference expression data
BioGPS	n/a
Orthologs
Databases	NCBI: entry; OMA: entry
Species	Human	Mouse
Entrez	9731	230967
Ensembl	ENSG00000116198	ENSMUSG00000039523
UniProt	O60308	Q80V31
RefSeq (mRNA)	NM_014704	NM_177673
RefSeq (protein)	NP_055519	NP_808341
Location (UCSC)	Chr 1: 3.81 – 3.86 Mb	Chr 4: 154.06 – 154.09 Mb
PubMed search
- Wikidata
View/Edit Human	View/Edit Mouse

Centrosomal protein 104kDa is a protein that in humans is encoded by the CEP104 gene. Like its Chlamydomonas ortholog, FAP256, it has been shown to localize to the distal ends of both centrioles in the absence of a cilium. During cilium formation, it is found at the tip of the elongating cilium.
