= Tetrabaenaceae =

- Tetrabaena socialis

Scientific classification
- Kingdom: Plantae
- Division: Chlorophyta
- Class: Chlorophyceae
- Order: Chlamydomonadales
- Family: Tetrabaenaceae; H.Nozaki & M.Ito

Genera
- Basichlamys; Tetrabaena

Family of algae

Tetrabaenaceae is a family of green algae in the order Chlamydomonadales. It is widespread but occasional, and found in freshwater habitats.

Members of the family Tetrabaenaceae consists of four-celled colonial organisms. Each cell is ovoid and biflagellate (with two equal flagella) and is embedded in a gelatinous matrix. Cells contain a large cup-shaped chloroplast with a basal pyrenoid, a stigma, and two contractile vacuoles at the base of the flagella. Sexual reproduction is isogamous.

The family contains two genera, Tetrabaena and Basichlamys. The two form a clade within the larger phylogroup Reinhardtinia, and were traditionally thought to be sister to the clade containing Volvocaceae and Goniaceae. However, recent phylogenomic evidence suggest that Chlamydomonas reinhardtii and its allies, and Vitreochlamys ordinata are nested within the Tetrabaenaceae+Goniaceae+Volvocaceae clade, rendering it paraphyletic. Therefore, the phylogenetic relationships would be as follows:

- - - Tetrabaenaceae
    - Vitreochlamys ordinata
  - - Chlamydomonadaceae sensu stricto (Chlamydomonas s.s., Edaphochlamys)
    - - Goniaceae
      - Volvocaceae
