= George Witman =

American biologist

George B. Witman III is an American biologist currently George F. Booth Chair Professor at University of Massachusetts Medical School and an Elected Fellow of the American Association for the Advancement of Science. His current research is on cilia and flagella biology and has made extensive work involving Chlamydomonas. His highly cited published papers are 1608, 789 and 709.
