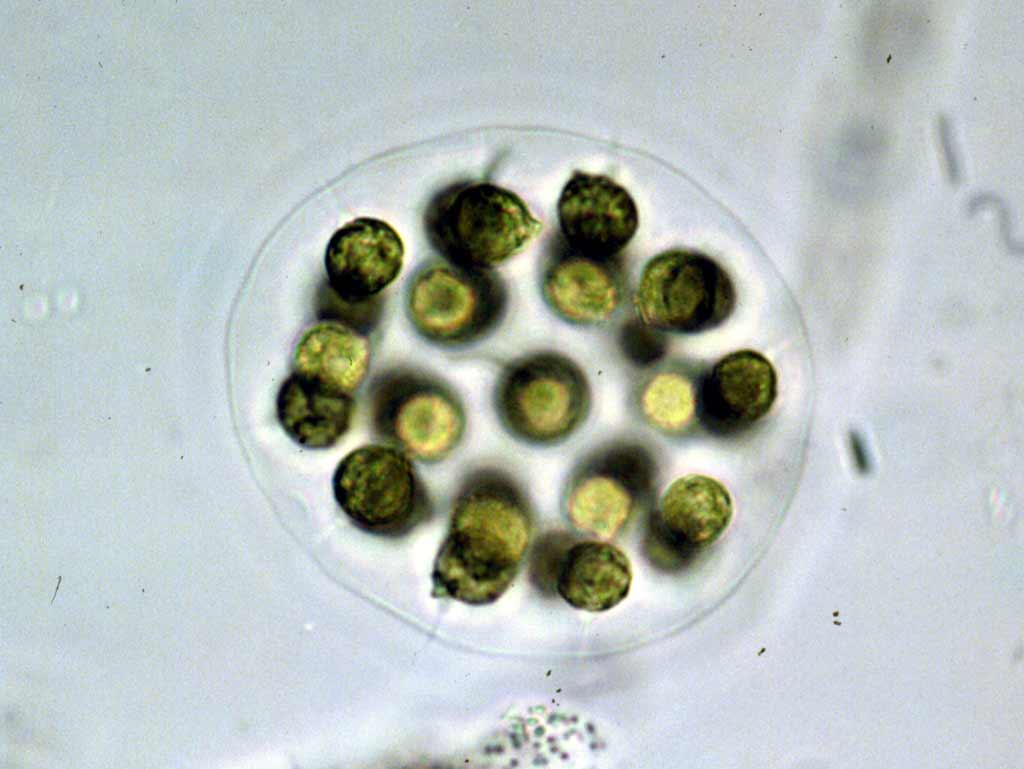
- Eudorina elegans

Scientific classification
- Kingdom: Plantae
- Division: Chlorophyta
- Class: Chlorophyceae
- Order: Chlamydomonadales
- Family: Volvocaceae
- Genus: Eudorina; Ehrenberg

Type species
- Eudorina elegans Ehrenberg

Species
- Eudorina compacta; Eudorina cylindrica; Eudorina elegans; Eudorina illinoisensis; Eudorina minodii; Eudorina unicocca

= Eudorina =

Genus of algae

Eudorina is a genus of green algae in the family Volvocaceae, containing about seven species. It has a cosmopolitan distribution in freshwater habitats.

== Description ==
Eudorina colonies typically consist of 16, 32 or 64 cells, each of which is similar to Chlamydomonas reinhardtii. These cells are bedded within an extracellular matrix composed of glycoproteins. Colonies are spherical and motile, with motility derived from the flagellated individual cells. Cells are ovoid or spherical, each with two equal flagella. (In one species Eudorina compacta, the cells essentially touch each other, and are strikingly angular due to mutual compression.) There is a single cup-shaped chloroplast with one (basal) or multiple pyrenoids) and a stigma. Multiple contractile vacuoles are scattered throughout the cytoplasm.

Eudorina is facultatively sexual, meaning colonies can reproduce either sexually or asexually. During development, each Chlamydomonas-like cell undergoes several rounds of division to form curved plates called plakeas, which then invert to form daughter colonies before hatching out of the mother colony. Sexual reproduction is anisogamous; cells divide successively and differentiate into sperm packets, or develop into female gametes (without division).

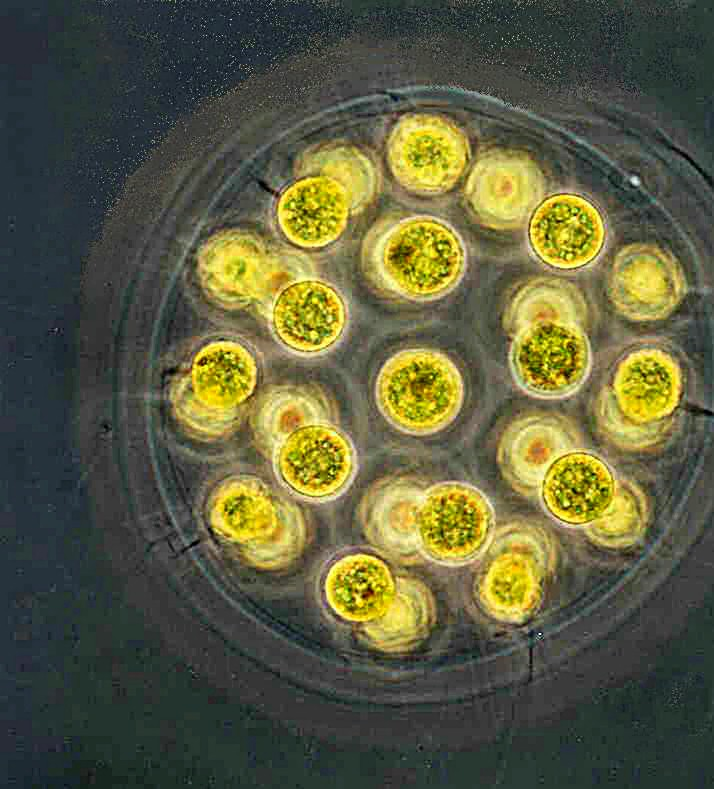
Eudorina elegans

== Taxonomy ==
Although the most common species of Eudorina (E. elegans) is very different from the most common species of Pandorina (P. morum), forms intermediate in morphology between Eudorina and Pandorina exist, such as Pandorina/Eudorina charkowiensis and Pandorina unicocca. These have been reclassified to other genera, namely Colemanosphaera and Yamagishiella, respectively. In particular, Eudorina is very similar to Yamagishiella, differing mainly in its mode of reproduction (anisogamous in Eudorina, isogamous in Yamagishiella) and number/placement of contractile vacuoles.

Molecular phylogenetic studies show that Eudorina is paraphyletic with respect to Pleodorina and Volvox (excluding section Volvox). Taxonomically, Eudorina has been confused with Pleodorina. In particular, Eudorina illinoisensis (syn. Pleodorina illinoisensis) blurs the boundaries between the two genera by having four anterior cells which are facultatively somatic. Currently, Eudorina is distinguished from Pleodorina by the absence or presence of obligately somatic cells.

Phylogenetic relationships are as follows (not all species of Eudorina are included:

- - Yamagishiella (outgroup)
  - - Eudorina minodii + Eudorina elegans pro parte + Eudorina compacta
    - - Pleodorina thompsonii
      - - Eudorina unicocca + Eudorina peripheralis
        - Eudorina cylindrica + Eudorina illinoisensis + Eudorina elegans pro parte
        - - Pleodorina starrii + Pleodorina indica
          - - Eudorina elegans pro parte
            - Volvox sect. Besseyosphaera
    - - Volvox aureus + Pleodorina pro parte
      - Volvox sect. Merrillosphaera
