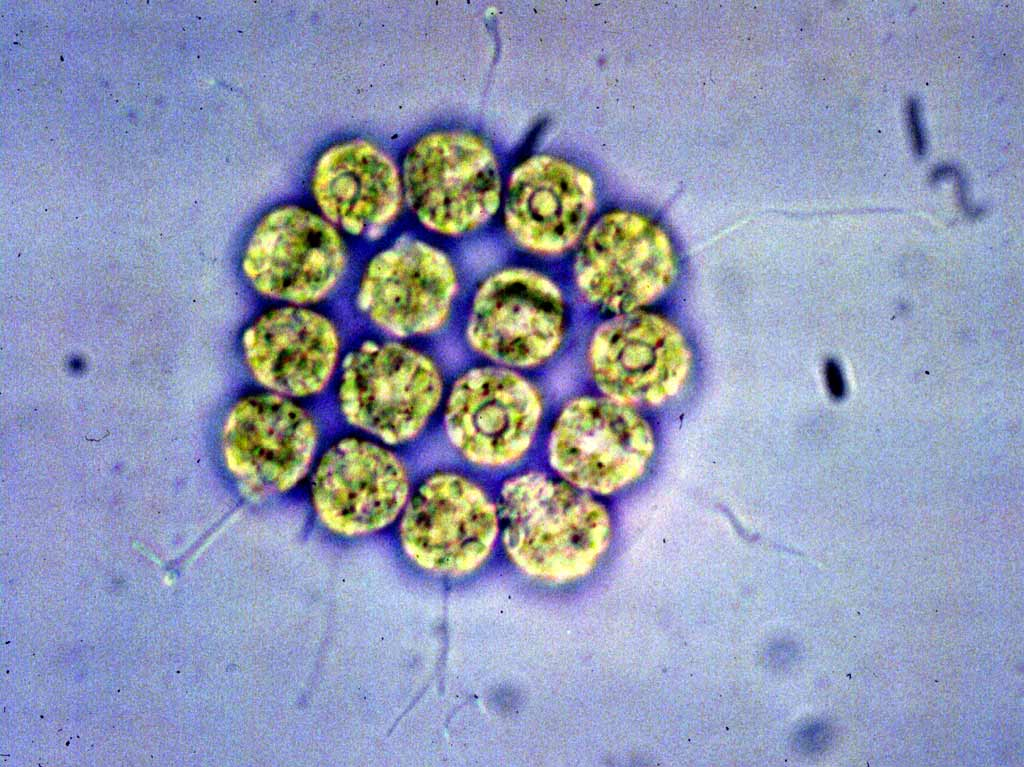

Scientific classification
- Domain: Eukaryota
- Clade: Archaeplastida
- Clade: Viridiplantae
- Division: Chlorophyta
- Class: Chlorophyceae
- Order: Chlamydomonadales
- Family: Goniaceae
- Genus: Gonium
- Species: G. pectorale

Binomial name
- Gonium pectorale O.F.Müller

= Gonium pectorale =

Species of alga

Gonium pectorale is a species of green algae in the family Goniaceae. It is a freshwater species with a cosmopolitan distribution.

Gonium pectorale is the type species of the genus Gonium, and is the most common species in the genus. It is a model organism for studying the evolution of multicellularity.

== Description ==
Gonium pectorale is a colonial, flagellate organism 70–100 μm wide, with 16 (sometimes 8 or 32) cells. In its usual form, it consists of four cells in the center and 12 cells in the periphery, with flagella pointing outward. Cells are nearly spherical or weakly pear-shaped, and are up to 18 μm wide. They contain a single cup-shaped chloroplast with one or two basal pyrenoids and an eyespot in the anterior. Each cell has two, equal flagella.

Gonium pectorale is similar to other Gonium species, especially in its 16-celled form. Eight-celled colonies of Gonium pectorale are almost always in a zig-zag arrangement of two cells per row. The similar species Gonium viridistellatum has eight-celled colonies consisting of seven peripheral cells and one central cell, while Gonium maiaprilis has eight-celled colonies in a variety of different configurations.

=== Varieties ===
Gonium pectorale is a very variable species. Within G. pectorale, two varieties have been described by Mary Pocock. Compared to the typical variety pectorale, variety praecox has smaller, usually pale green colonies with elongated cells. The term praecox refers to the early (precocious) development of daughter colonies.

== Reproduction ==
Gonium pectorale reproduces both asexually and sexually. In Gonium pectorale, the protoplasm of a cell divides successively until it forms a new, miniature colony. Sexual reproduction is isogamous; each cell in a colony becomes a gamete. The gametes contact each other by their flagella, and form a cytoplasmic bridge until they fuse, becoming a zygote. The zygote has a thick, smooth cell wall. Upon germination, the zygote forms four cells which undergo successive divisions, eventually becoming a 16-celled colony.

Within Gonium pectorale, there are two clades that appear to be reproductively isolated. Clade A is cosmopolitan, whereas Clade B is restricted to the Southern Hemisphere.

== Habitat ==
Gonium pectorale is found in freshwater habitats, particularly nutrient-rich lakes, rivers, ditches and ponds. It is most common in spring.
