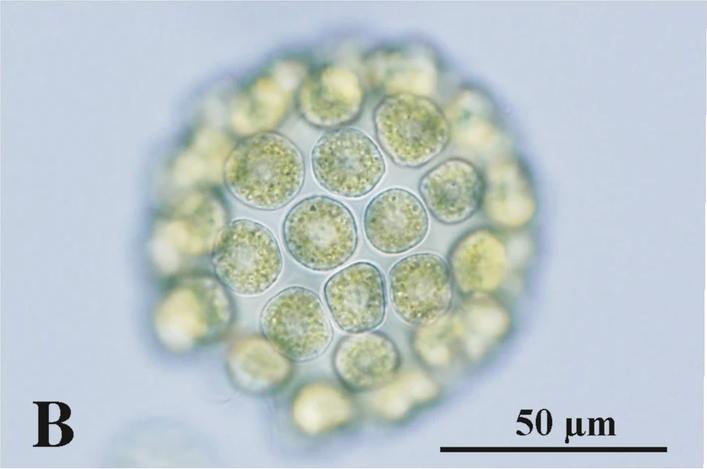
- Astrephomene gubernaculifera

Scientific classification
- Domain: Eukaryota
- Clade: Archaeplastida
- Clade: Viridiplantae
- Division: Chlorophyta
- Class: Chlorophyceae
- Order: Chlamydomonadales
- Family: Goniaceae
- Genus: Astrephomene; Pocock

Species
- Astrephomene gubernaculifera; Astrephomene perforata

= Astrephomene =

Genus of algae

Astrephomene is a genus of green algae in the family Goniaceae, order Chlamydomonadales. The genus was first discovered in 1937 by Mary Pocock and later named by Pocock in 1953. The name comes from the Classical Greek roots a- (meaning "not") and strephomene (meaning "turning itself"), referring to its mode of reproduction. To date, the genus contains two species.

Astrephomene is a member of the volvocine algae, a group of algae that are a model organism. Volvocine algae are used to study the origins and evolution of multicellularity. The genome of Astrephomene gubernaculifera has been sequenced.

== Description ==
Astrephomene is a colonial, flagellated green alga, consisting of 16, 32, 64 or 128 cells arranged at the periphery of a gelatinous matrix. Two to seven cells are somatic cells (also termed rudder cells); they are small and oriented such that their flagella form a rudder. Cells are spherical or lenticular (lens-shaped), and each cell contains an eyespot, two flagella, several contractile vacuoles at the anterior end, and a large cup-shaped chloroplast. Each cell is surrounded by a gelatinous sheath and adjacent cells are attached to each other by their sheaths, forming a hollow, ovoid or spheroidal colony.

Astrephomene gubernaculifera can reproduce sexually or asexually. During asexual reproduction, rotation of daughter protoplasts occurs in conjunction with the movement of basal bodies during successive cell divisions, ending with the anterior end of all cells of the daughter colony outside after the first nuclear and cytoplasmic division. This type of asexual reproduction is unique among the colonial volvocine green algae. By contrast, in Eudorina, protoplast rotation is lacking during successive divisions; a spheroidal colony is formed by means of inversion after successive divisions. In sexual reproduction, Astrephomene has two identical mating types (i.e. is isogamous); these fuse to form zygotes.

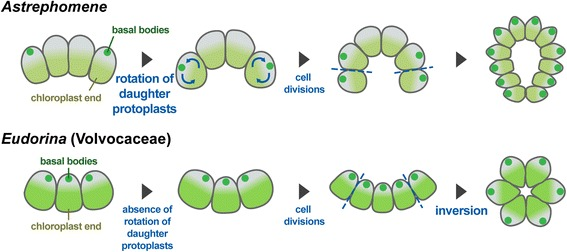
Schematic diagrams of the two mechanisms of spheroidal colony formation in the volvocine algae. In Astrephomene, rotation of daughter protoplasts occurs in conjunction with the movement of basal bodies during successive cell divisions. In Eudorina, protoplast rotation is lacking during successive divisions; a spheroidal colony is formed by means of inversion after successive divisions.

== Habitats ==
Astrephomene gubernaculifera is often found in organically rich temporary pools, often in pasture ponds. It typically persists for 1–3 weeks after ponds are formed in beginning of the wet season.

It has been collected from South Africa, Australia, the United States, and Japan.

== Taxonomy ==
Astrephomene was formerly placed in the monotypic family Astrephomenaceae. Astrephomenaceae is now considered obsolete, and the genus is now classified within the Goniaceae.

Astrephomene consists of two species, Astrephomene gubernaculifera and Astrephomene perforata. The two species differ in the morphology of the cells, such as the shape of their cellular sheaths and presence of pyrenoids.

== Evolution ==
Colony inversion is believed to have arisen twice in the order Chlamydomonadales. Spheroidal colony formation differs between the two lineages: rotation of daughter protoplasts during successive cell divisions in Astrephomene, and inversion after cell divisions in Eudorina.

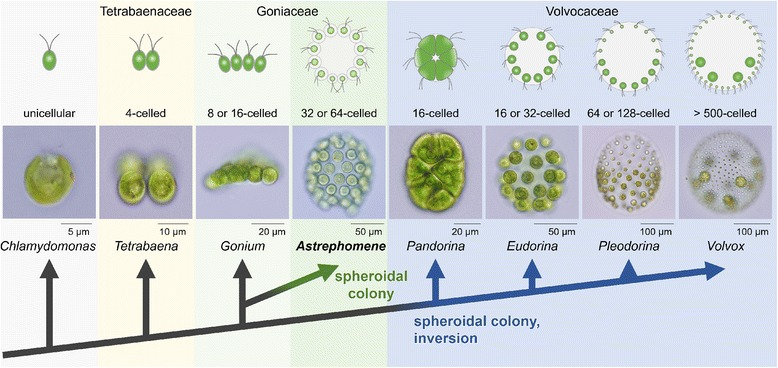
Schematic representation of the phylogenetic relationships of the volvocine algae and the parallel evolution of the spheroidal colony. Volvocine algae range from the unicellular Chlamydomonas to the multicellular Volvox through various intermediate forms and are used as a model for research into the evolution of multicellularity. The spheroidal colony is thought to have evolved twice independently within this group: once in the Volvocaceae, from Pandorina to Volvox, and the other in the genus Astrephomene. All drawings and photographs represent side views of individuals with anterior ends orienting toward the top of this figure. Note that the phylogeny has been revised in newer studies, placing Tetrabaena as sister to the rest of the group.
