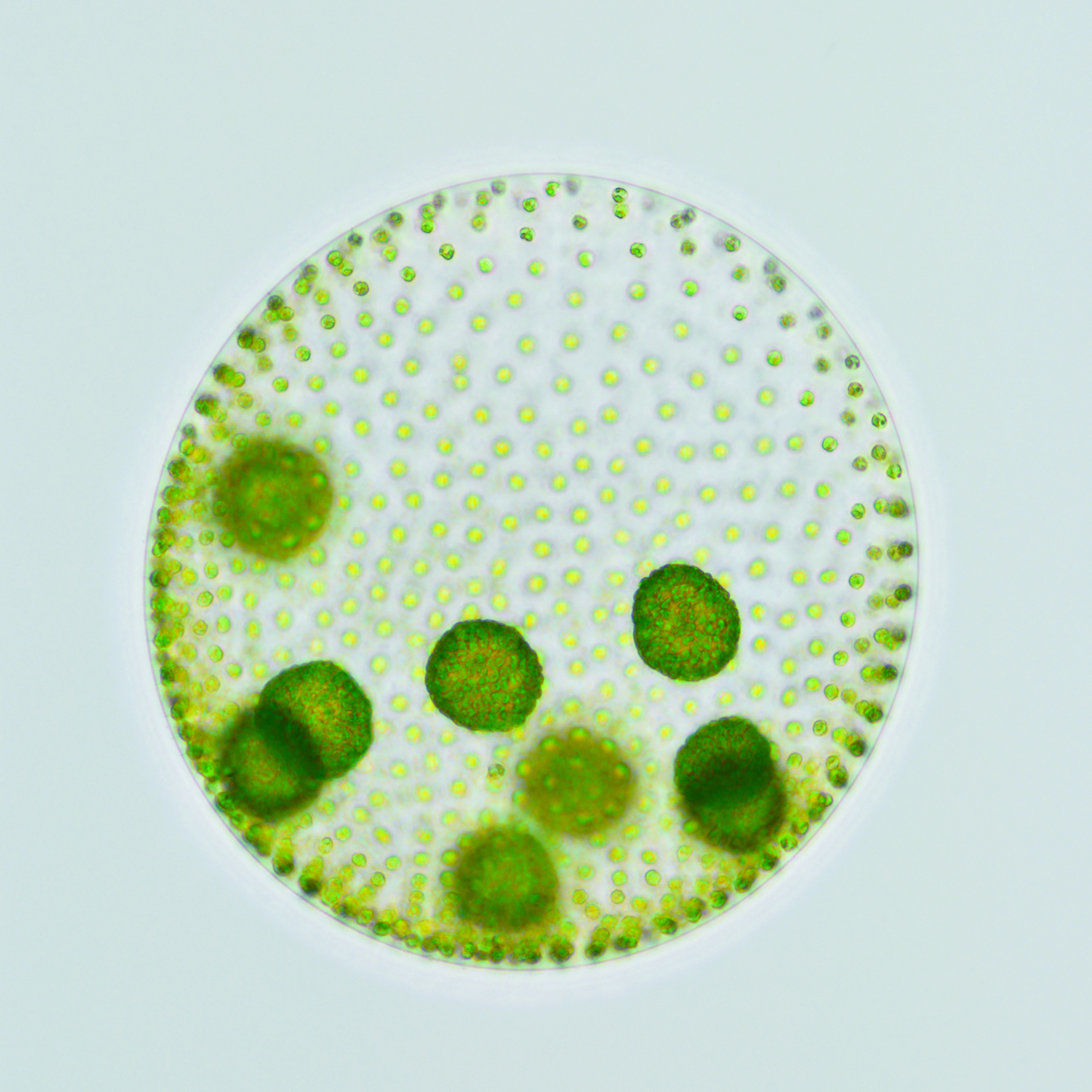
- Volvox aureus

Scientific classification
- Domain: Eukaryota
- Clade: Archaeplastida
- Clade: Viridiplantae
- Division: Chlorophyta
- Class: Chlorophyceae
- Order: Chlamydomonadales
- Family: Volvocaceae; Ehrenberg

Genera
- Colemanosphaera; †Eovolvox; Eudorina; Hamakko; Hemiflagellochloris; Lundiella; Mastigosphaera; Pandorina; Platydorina; Pleodorina; Stephanoon; Tabris; Volvox; †Volvoximorphites; Volvulina; Yamagishiella

= Volvocaceae =

Family of algae

Volvocaceae are a family of unicellular or colonial biflagellate algae, including the typical genus Volvox, and are collectively known as the volvocine algae. The family was named by Ehrenberg in 1834, and it is known in older classifications as the Volvocidae. All species are colonial and typically inhabit freshwater environments. They are particularly useful as model organisms for studying the evolution of multicellularity, the evolution of sex, and cellular motion and mechanics.

== Description ==
Volvocine algae consist of multiple, biflagellate cells. Each cell has a cell membrane, a central nucleus, multiple mitochondria, and one large chloroplast with an associated stigma (also known an eyespot). The stigma is reddish due to the presence of rhodopsin. The apical end of the cell has two equal-length flagella; the flagella beat in a manner similar to a breaststroke.

=== Cellular organization ===
The simplest of the Volvocaeans are ordered assemblies of cells, each similar to the related unicellular protist Chlamydomonas and embedded in a gelatinous matrix. For example, the genera Eudorina and Pandorina form hollow spheres, the former consisting of 16 cells, the latter of 32 to 64 cells. In these genera each cell can reproduce a new organism by mitosis.

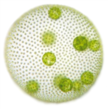
Volvox sp.

Other genera of Volvocaceans represent another principle of biological development as each organism develops differented cell types. In Pleodorina and Volvox, most cells are somatic and only a few are reproductive. In Pleodorina californica a colony normally has either 128 or 64 cells, of which those in the anterior region have only a somatic function, while those in the posterior region can reproduce; the ratio being 3:5. In Volvox only very few cells are able to reproduce new individuals, and in some species of Volvox the reproductive cells are derived from cells looking and behaving like somatic cells. In V. carteri, on the other hand, the division of labor is complete with reproductive cells being set aside during cell division, and they never assume somatic functions or develop functional flagella. Thus, the simplest Volvocaceans are colonial organisms but others are truly multicellular organisms.

=== Asexual reproduction ===
Volvocine algae can reproduce sexually, but asexual reproduction is the main mode of reproduction, and involves a unique feature termed colony inversion. Colony inversion during development is a special characteristic of this order that results in new colonies having their flagella facing outwards. During this process reproductive cells first undergo successive cell divisions to form a concave-to-cup-shaped embryo or plakea (curved plate) composed of a single cell layer. Immediately after, the cell layer is inside out compared with the adult configuration—the apical ends of the embryo protoplasts from which flagella are formed, are oriented toward the interior of the plakea. Then the embryo undergoes inversion, during which the cell layer inverts to form a spheroidal daughter colony with the apical ends and flagella of daughter protoplasts positioned outside. This process enables appropriate locomotion of spheroidal colonies of the Volvocaceae. The mechanism of inversion has been investigated extensively at the cellular and molecular levels using a model species, Volvox carteri. Another species Volvox globator has a similar mode of colony inversion, but begins at the posterior instead of the anterior.

Spheroidal colony inversion evolved twice during evolution of the Chlamydomonadales. In the Volvocaceae inversion first occurred when the Volvocaceae diverged from the closely related Goniaceae (see figure). It also occurred during evolution of Astrephomene. Inversion differs between the two lineages: rotation of daughter protoplasts during successive cell divisions in Astrephomene, and inversion after cell divisions in the Volvocaceae.

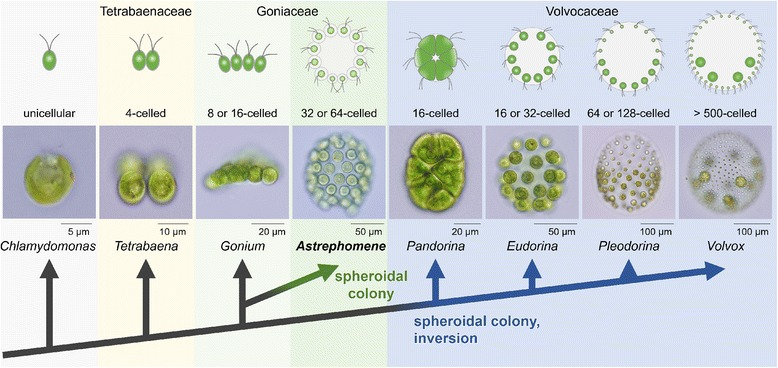
Schematic representation of the phylogenetic relationships of the volvocine algae and the parallel evolution of the spheroidal colony. Volvocine algae range from the unicellular Chlamydomonas to the multicellular Volvox through various intermediate forms and are used as a model for research into the evolution of multicellularity. The spheroidal colony is thought to have evolved twice independently within this group: once in the Volvocaceae, from Pandorina to Volvox, and the other in the genus Astrephomene. All drawings and photographs represent side views of individuals with anterior ends orienting toward the top of this figure. Note that the phylogeny has been revised in newer studies, placing Tetrabaena as sister to the rest of the group.

=== Sexual reproduction ===
Larger volvocaceans have evolved a specialized form of heterogamy called oogamy, the production of small motile sperm by one mating type and relatively larger immotile eggs by another. Among the Volvocaceans are thus one of the simplest organisms with distinguishable male and female members. In all Volvocaceans, the fertilization reaction results in the production of a dormant diploid zygote (zygospore) capable of surviving in harsh environments. Once conditions have improved the zygospore germinates and undergoes meiosis to produce haploid offspring of both mating types.

== Habitat and ecology ==
Volvocine algae are most commonly found in still freshwater habitats such as ponds, lakes, and puddles, but can less commonly be found from soil, ice, and snow. Algal blooms are most common in spring and summer. They typically do not grow well within soils, but their zygotes are resistant to harsh conditions, and can remain dormant over the winter.

Volvocine algae require vitamin B_{12}, and most require a light source for photosynthesis. A few taxa, such as Volvulina steinii can grow in the dark provided there is a carbon source such as acetate.

The ecology of volvocine algae has been little-studied. The colonies and zygotes of volvocine algae are eaten by many different freshwater organisms, such as ciliates, worms, rotifers, amoebae, arthropods, and fish. There is some evidence that colonies can swim downwards and sit still within particulate matter, effectively camouflaging themselves.

== Evolution and taxonomy ==
The family Volvocaceae is monophyletic. Volvocine algae, including the taxa Tetrabaenaceae, Goniaceae and Chlamydomonas, are well-studied for their transitions between multicellularity. Unlike most multicellular lineages (such as animals and land plants) whose transition from unicellularity to multicellularity was long ago, Volvocaceae and their multicellular relatives diverged relatively recently from the unicellular Chlamydomonas reinhardtii. The exact timing is unclear: some studies find that the divergence occurred about 50 million to 200 million years ago, while others find that Volvocaceae as a lineage emerged earlier, around the Triassic period. Natural selection is thought to be a driving force behind the evolution, such as becoming bigger to escape predation.

The developmental biologist David L. Kirk hypothesized that multicellularity in Volvocaceae would arise through a number of smaller transitions. This roadmap, called the "12-Step Program", was largely confirmed by genomic data, but it was also found that convergent evolution is very common. Genera within Volvocaceae have been defined based on morphological characters such as the number and shape of cells, the spacing between the cells, number of pyrenoids, and mode of sexual reproduction. However, it is known that many of these genera are polyphyletic or paraphyletic.

=== Phylogeny ===
Phylogenomic studies suggest the following relationships (not all genera and species are included):

- - Goniaceae (outgroup)
  - Volvocaceae
    - Volvox sect. Volvox
    - - - - Platydorina
          - Colemanosphaera
        - Volvulina + Pandorina
      - - Yamagishiella
        - - Eudorina minodii + Eudorina elegans pro parte
          - - Pleodorina thompsonii
            - - Eudorina unicocca + Eudorina peripheralis
              - Eudorina cylindrica + Eudorina illinoisensis + Eudorina elegans pro parte
              - - Pleodorina starrii + Pleodorina indica
                - - Eudorina elegans pro parte
                  - Volvox sect. Besseyosphaera
          - - Volvox aureus + Pleodorina pro parte
            - Volvox sect. Merrillosphaera

=== Fossils ===
In general, fossils of algae are rare because they lack hard structures, and therefore quickly decompose after death. There are a few microfossils that may have affinities to volvocalean algae, such as Eovolvox, which consists of hollow spherules with a surface lined with closely spaced cells. However, the taxonomic placement of these fossils is mostly unclear.
