= Hemiflagellochloris =

Scientific classification
- Clade: Viridiplantae
- Division: Chlorophyta
- Class: Chlorophyceae
- Order: Chlamydomonadales
- Family: Volvocaceae
- Genus: Hemiflagellochloris; S.Watanabe, S.Tsujimura, T.Misono, S.Nakamura & H.Inoue, 2006
- Species: H. kazakhstanica

Binomial name
- Hemiflagellochloris kazakhstanica S.Watanabe, S.Tsujimura, T.Misono, S.Nakamura & H.Inoue, 2006

Genus of algae

Hemiflagellochloris is a monotypic genus of green algae in the family Volvocaceae. It has only one known species, Hemiflagellochloris kazakhstanica, discovered from a saline irrigation land in Kazakhstan.

Hemiflagellochloris kazakhstanica consists of single, ellipsoidal to spherical cells with a smooth cell wall. They contain a single nucleus and a parietal chloroplast with pyrenoids. Reproduction occurs asexually via aplanospores or zoospores; zoospores have two flagella, with one half the length of the other. Hemiflagellochloris is unique due to its zoospores, which have considerably unequal flagella; it is only distantly related to other green algae with unequal-length flagella.
