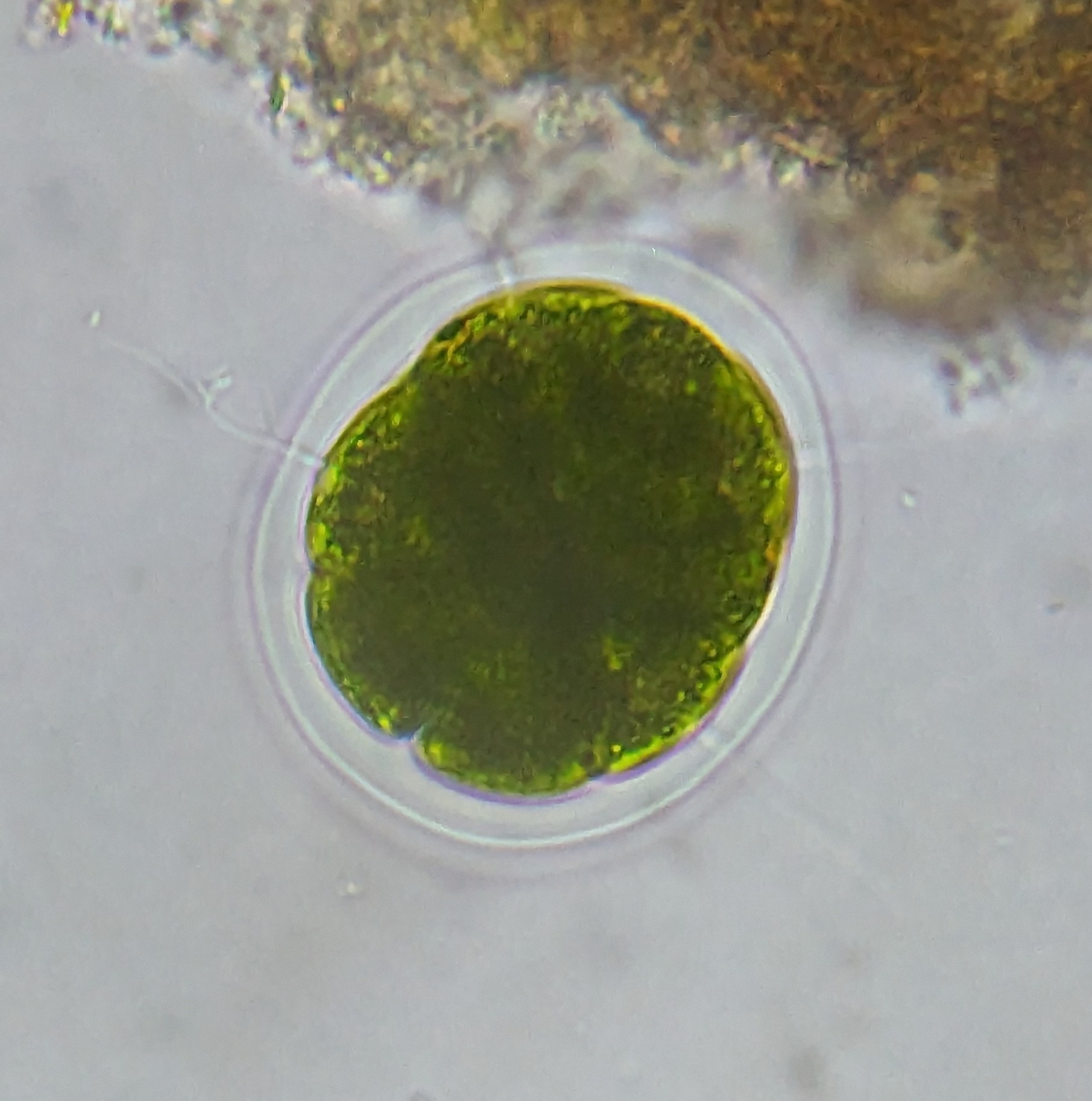

Scientific classification
- Clade: Viridiplantae
- Division: Chlorophyta
- Class: Chlorophyceae
- Order: Chlamydomonadales
- Family: Volvocaceae
- Genus: Pandorina
- Species: P. morum

Binomial name
- Pandorina morum (O.F.Müller) Bory

= Pandorina morum =

Species of alga

Pandorina morum is a species of green algae in the family Volvocaceae, and is the type species of the genus Pandorina.

It is a freshwater species with a cosmopolitan distribution, and is common in lowland rivers, lakes, ponds, and ditches with circumneutral pH. It sometimes forms blooms of up to a thousand cells per mL.

== Naming ==
Pandorina morum was first described by Otto Friedrich Müller in 1786, who called it Volvox morum. Later in 1826, Jean-Baptiste Bory de Saint-Vincent transferred it to its own genus, calling it Pandorina. The way the daughter colonies break out of the old parental layers reminded Bory of Pandora's box and therefore he named it Pandorina, with "-ina" being a French diminutive.

The specific epithet "morum" likely refers to a mulberry or blackberry fruit, which Pandorina morum resembles. Müller, naming his organism Volvox morum, most likely named the organism "morum" as a Latin noun in apposition. When Bory transferred Volvox morum to Pandorina, he named it Pandorina mora, appearing to have interpreted "morum/mora" as an adjective. This is most likely in error, since "morum/mora" means silly or foolish.

== Description ==
Pandorina morum consists of subspherical colonies (coenobia) 20–60 μm in diameter, with cells 8–17 μm long; the colony is surrounded by a transparent layer of mucilage. Each coenobium has 8 or 16 cells, which are compressed into a dense spherical aggregate and conical at the base. Each cell has two flagella, longer than the cell, radially arranged around the coenobium. An apical contractile vacuoles is present, right beneath each flagellum. In each cell is a single, cup-shaped, longitudinally striated chloroplast with an anterior eyespot and basal pyrenoid. The nucleus is located near the middle of the chloroplast.

A similar species is Pandorina colemaniae, which has chloroplasts with at least two pyrenoids.

Within Pandorina morum, several varieties have been described, but these may represent separate species.

== Reproductive isolation ==
Pandorina morum is defined by a morphological species concept, but within Pandorina morum there is extensive intraspecific variation. Within P. morum, there are at least 21 biological species which are reproductively isolated; two of these are cosmopolitan. Strains of P. morum grouped into seven clades, which differ in terms of chromosome number, zygote arrangement pattern, division time, and presence of loroxanthin.
