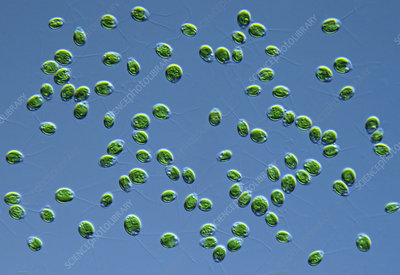

Scientific classification
- Domain: Eukaryota
- Supergroup: Archaeplastida
- Clade: Viridiplantae
- Division: Chlorophyta
- Class: Chlorophyceae
- Order: Chlamydomonadales
- Family: Chlamydomonadaceae
- Genus: Chlamydomonas
- Species: C. moewusii

Binomial name
- Chlamydomonas moewusii Gerloff

= Chlamydomonas moewusii =

Species of algae

Chlamydomonas moewusii is a species of unicellular green alga belonging to the genus Chlamydomonas. C. moewusii is typically a freshwater species and occupies a significant position as a model organism for various scientific studies due to its relatively simple cellular structure and ease of cultivation.

== Taxonomy ==
Chlamydomonas moewusii was first published by Gerloff in 1940. In his research, Gerloff examined cultures of Chlamydomonas eugametos sourced from the Berlin Institute of Plant Physiology. His findings contradicted the description provided by Moewus(1933), indicating the presence of a papilla and a significantly thinner membrane than previously described and illustrated by Moewus.

== Distribution ==
Chlamydomonas moewusii is commonly found in freshwater and soil environments worldwide.

== Morphology ==
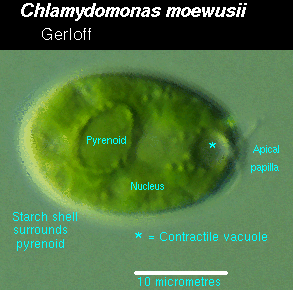

Chlamydomonas moewusii is a unicellular organism with a characteristic chloroplast-containing cell. Individual cells are typically small, around 20 micrometers in diameter, and have a spherical to ovoid shape. Chlamydomonas moewusii possesses two flagella, which it uses for locomotion and orientation in its aquatic environment. As in other Chlamydomonas species, reproduction in C. moewusii occurs both asexually through cell division and sexually through the formation of gametes.

== Reproduction ==
Chlamydomonas moewusii is a heterothallic species, exhibiting distinct behavioral differences between the gametes of its two mating types. When suspensions containing 'plus' and 'minus' gametes are mixed under light, they form clumps that eventually separate into pairs after a few minutes. These pairs then swim freely for 4–8 hours. Throughout this motile phase, there is no fusion of nuclei or cytoplasm between the cells; instead, they remain connected at their anterior ends by a short protoplasmic bridge, moving consistently in one direction. Despite both gametes retaining their flagella, only one flagellum is actively involved in propulsion. This activity is observable under favorable lighting conditions: one cell's flagellum actively beats while the other's trails behind, occasionally twitching.

== Motion ==
Chlamydomonas moewusii exhibits a unique type of motion propelled by its two flagella. This motility is essential for various biological processes, including navigation towards light sources for photosynthesis, finding optimal environmental conditions, and locating nutrients.The motion of C. moewusii is primarily characterized by a type of swimming known as "flagellar beating." Each cell possesses two flagella of unequal length: a longer anterior flagellum and a shorter posterior flagellum. These flagella beat in a coordinated fashion, generating propulsion for the cell through the surrounding medium, typically water.
