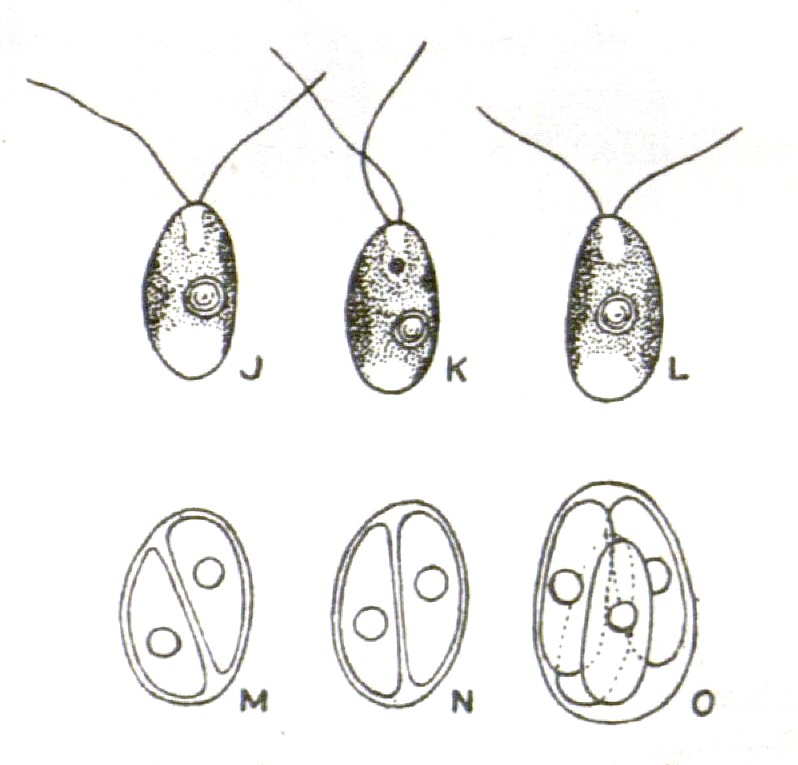

Scientific classification
- Clade: Viridiplantae
- Division: Chlorophyta
- Class: Chlorophyceae
- Order: Chlamydomonadales
- Family: Chlamydomonadaceae
- Genus: Chlamydomonas
- Species: C. elegans

Binomial name
- Chlamydomonas elegans G.S.West 1915

= Chlamydomonas elegans =

Species of alga

Chlamydomonas elegans is a species of freshwater green algae. It is commonly found in rainwater pools and other small, temporary bodies of water.

Chlamydomonas elegans is a unicellular organism with ellipsoidal-ovoid cells, which are usually flattened on one side, and rounded at the ends. Cell bodies are 23–30 μm long and 13–15 μm wide. The cell wall is thin, lacking a papilla. The two flagella extend from the anterior end of the cell and slightly longer than the cell body. The chloroplast lines the side of the cell, and is divided into two lobes at the front of the cell. The chloroplast contains a single spherical pyrenoid, located at the middle of the cell. A stigma is absent. The cell nucleus is in the front third of the cell. Two contractile vacuoles are at the anterior end of the cell.
