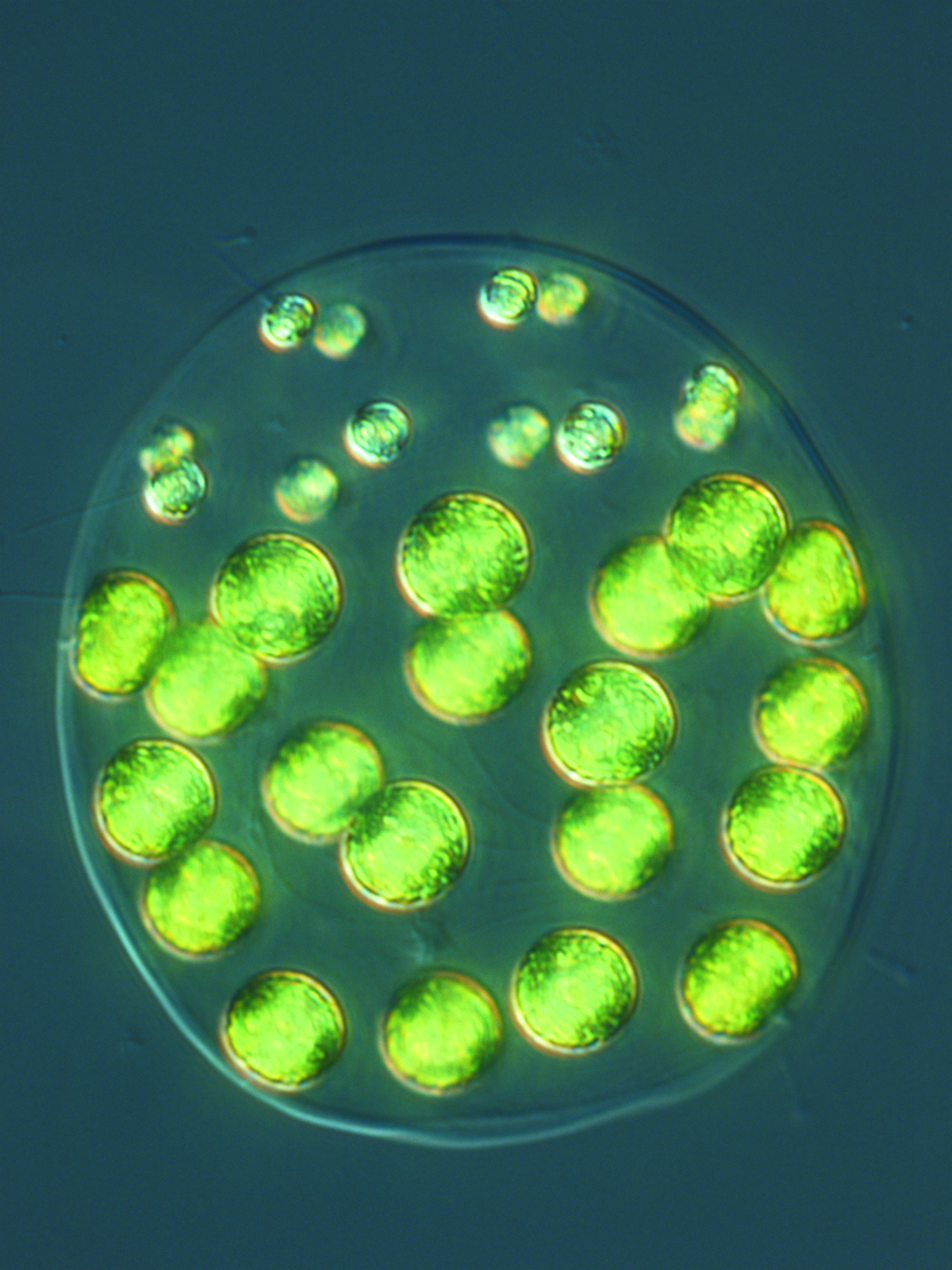

Scientific classification
- Kingdom: Plantae
- Division: Chlorophyta
- Class: Chlorophyceae
- Order: Chlamydomonadales
- Family: Volvocaceae
- Genus: Pleodorina
- Species: P. starrii

Binomial name
- Pleodorina starrii H.Nozaki, F.D.Ott & A.W.Coleman, 2006

= Pleodorina starrii =

Species of algae

Pleodorina starrii is a species of algae that resides in freshwater in Japan. The name starri is in honor of phycologist Richard C. Starr.

Since 2006 it has provided molecular genetic evidence for an evolutionary link between sexes and mating types. It was later confirmed to be the first reportedly trioecious haploid species.

== Description ==
Pleodorina starrii is a colonial organism. The colonies are spherical or ellipsoidal and consist of 32 or 64 biflagellate cells embedded in the periphery of a gelatinous matrix, thus forming a hollow sphere. Cells are differentiated into somatic and reproductive cells; in 32-celled colonies, 8–12 of the cells are somatic while in 64-celled colonies, 18–20 of the cells are somatic. Somatic cells are nearly spherical, up to 13 μm in diameter, having a cup-shaped chloroplast with a single pyrenoid. Two contractile vacuoles are present near the base of the flagella, as well as several others near the cell surface. Reproductive cells are nearly spherical, up to 21 μm in diameter; they contain a massive cup-shaped chloroplast, a small stigma, two contractile vacuoles at the base of the flagella, and several more contractile vacuoles beneath the cell surface. In immature reproductive cells, the chloroplasts only have one pyrenoid, but in maturity they have five to eight nearly equal-sized pyrenoids randomly distributed throughout the chloroplast. When stained with methylene blue, individual sheaths surrounding each cell are visible.

== Reproduction ==
In asexual reproduction, the reproductive cells divide successively five or six times to form a plakea (curved plate), which then inverts to form a daughter colony. Somatic cells do not reproduce.

Pleodorina starrii is trioecious meaning males, females, and hermaphrodites exist in the species.

Reproduction is asexual under normal conditions and creates colonies of clones with the same genotype. Sexual reproduction is induced by low-nitrogen conditions and is anisogamous.

== Studies on the species ==
The species was involved in a 2006 study that provided the first molecular genetic evidence for the evolutionary link between sexes and mating types. A male-specific gene was founded in the species and named "OTOKOGI", meaning manliness or chivalry in Japanese.

The species was previously believed to be heterothallic with males and females, but a 2021 study revealed it also contained hermaphrodites. This study was the first time the sexual system trioecy has been reported in haploid species and it challenged models for the evolution of sexual systems. Although trioecy is viewed as being an evolutionarily unstable transitional state between dioecy and monoecy, a 2023 study revealed this is probably not the case in this species. Instead, in this species, trioecy could have evolved due to the reorganization of certain genes.
