= Yamagishiella =

Scientific classification
- Kingdom: Plantae
- Division: Chlorophyta
- Class: Chlorophyceae
- Order: Chlamydomonadales
- Family: Volvocaceae
- Genus: Yamagishiella; Nozaki
- Species: Y. unicocca

Binomial name
- Yamagishiella unicocca (Rayburn & R.C.Starr) Nozaki

Genus of algae

Yamagishiella is a genus of colonial green algae in the family Volvocaceae. It contains the single species Yamagishiella unicocca. It was first described in 1974 as Pandorina unicocca, and then transferred to a new genus in 1992. It is a freshwater species.

== Description ==
Yamagishiella consists of ovoid, ellipsoid or cylindrical colonies of cells. Each colony has 16 or 32 cells, arranged around the periphery of a gelatinous matrix and forming a hollow sphere. Each cell of the colony is surrounded by a cellular envelope. Cells are ovoid or spherical, somewhat angular due to mutual compression. Each cell has two equal, apical flagella, longer than the cell itself. Cells have a single conspicuous stigma (eyespot), two contractile vacuoles at the base of each flagella, and a large cup-shaped chloroplast with a basal pyrenoid. The cells are weakly differentiated, with anterior cells having larger eyespots than posterior cells.

Sexual reproduction is isogamous, with no differentiation between reproduction and somatic cells.

=== Identification ===
Yamagishiella can be difficult to distinguish from Eudorina, particularly the species Eudorina unicocca. It differs from Eudorina by its isogamous sexual reproduction. In terms of vegetative morphology and asexual reproduction characteristics, Yamagishiella unicocca and Eudorina unicocca is very similar, but differs in the number and position of contractile vacuoles. In Y. unicocca, each cell has two apical contractile vacuoles (right below the flagella), while in E. unicocca they are irregularly distributed within the cell.
