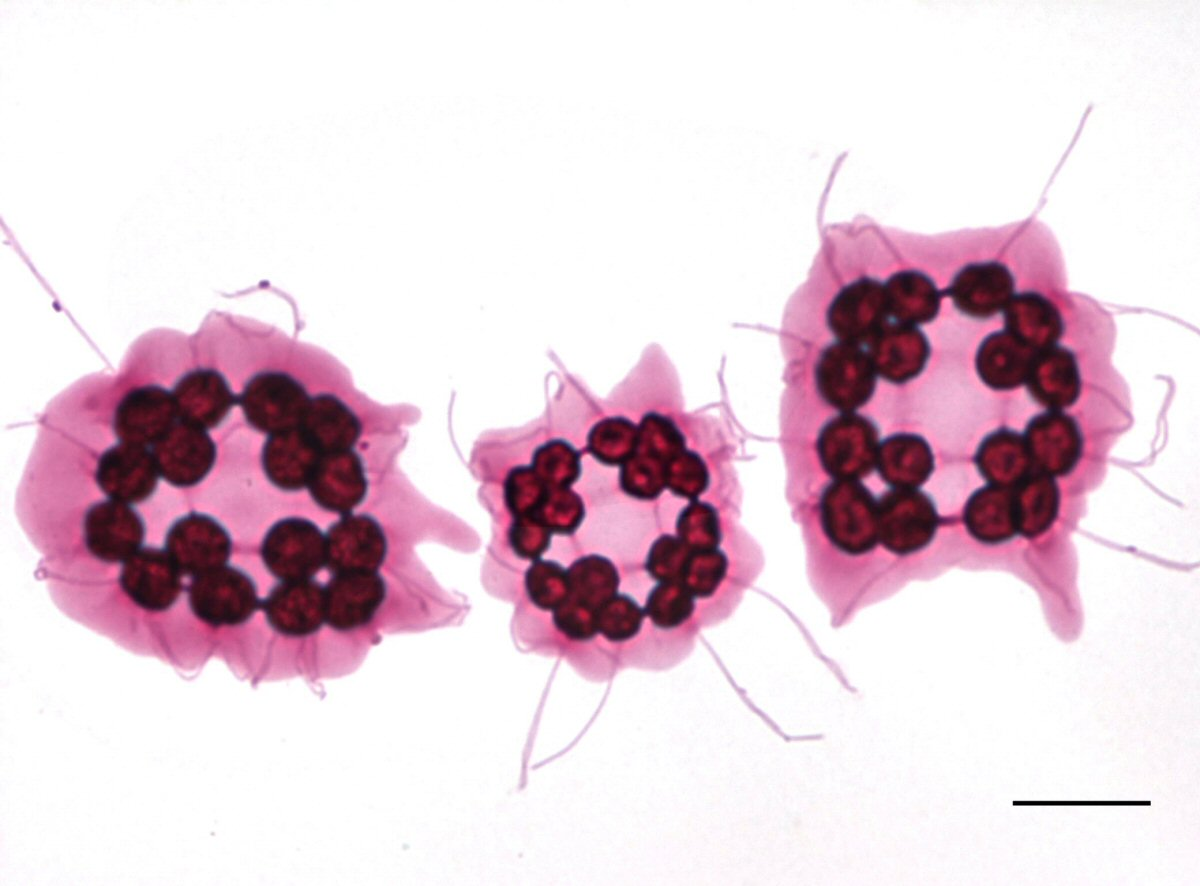
- Stained coenobia

Scientific classification
- Kingdom: Plantae
- Division: Chlorophyta
- Class: Chlorophyceae
- Order: Chlamydomonadales
- Family: Volvocaceae
- Genus: Platydorina; Kofoid
- Species: P. caudata

Binomial name
- Platydorina caudata Kofoid

= Platydorina =

Genus of algae

Platydorina is a genus of microscopic green algae in the family Volvocaceae. It contains only one species, Platydorina caudata. It was described by Charles Atwood Kofoid in 1899.

== Description ==
Platydorina caudata consists of a flattened, horseshoe-shaped coenobium containing 16 or 32 cells embedded in a transparent, gelatinous matrix. Cells have two flagella that protrude out of the matrix. Each cell is uniformly sized and colored green from a single cup-shaped chloroplast containing a pyrenoid, with a circular red eyespot and two contractile vacuoles. At one end the matrix is rounded, while at the other end it is drawn out into a few rounded "tails".

Platydorina caudata is planktonic, and moves in a spiral motion, twisting to the left.

== Reproduction ==
Platydorina caudata reproduces both sexually and asexually. In asexual reproduction, cells in the coenobium divide continuously until they reach a certain cell count, 16 or 32 cells. At this point, the flagella are pointing inward, but the colony flips inside out (a process known as colony inversion) such that the flagella now point outward. The colony, which is spherical, flattens out into the characteristic horseshoe-shape. After the gelatinous matrix forms, the new colony separates from the parent.

In sexual reproduction, colonies may be either male or female and produce sperm or egg cells, respectively. It is anisogamous, meaning the gametes are differently sized. Both sperm and egg cells are released, where they swim about until fertilized. Egg cells escape in an unusual way; a pore forms, and then the egg cell squeezes through the pore until it is released.
