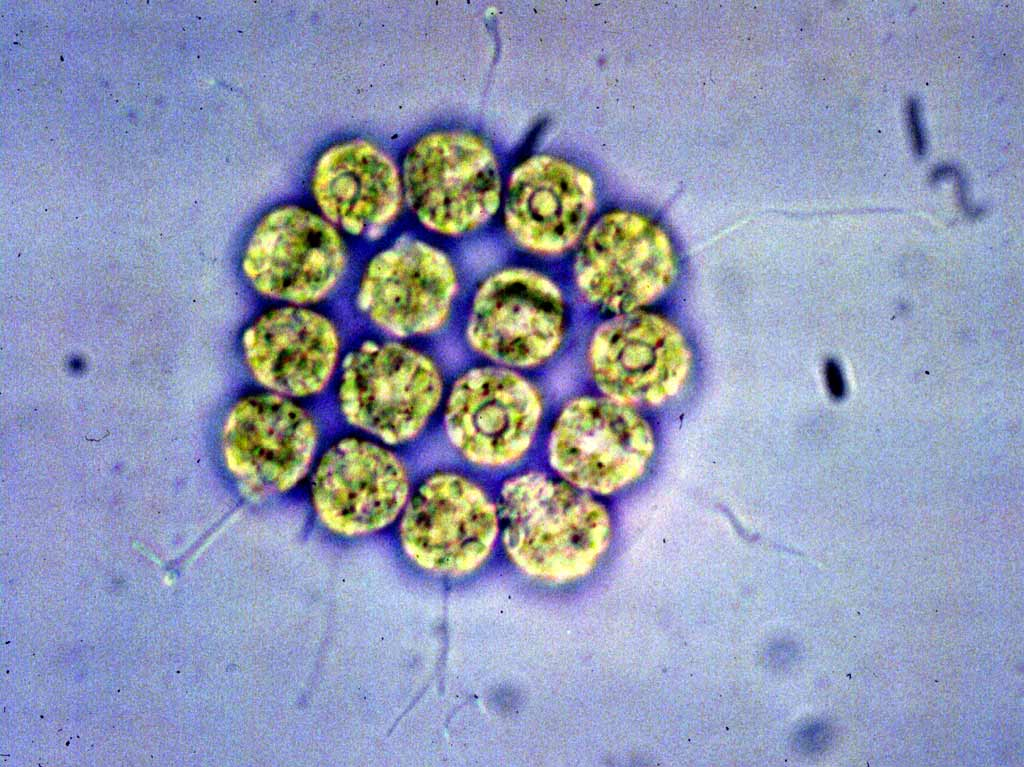
- Gonium pectorale

Scientific classification
- Domain: Eukaryota
- Clade: Archaeplastida
- Clade: Viridiplantae
- Division: Chlorophyta
- Class: Chlorophyceae
- Order: Chlamydomonadales
- Family: Goniaceae

Genera
- Astrephomene; Gonium

= Goniaceae =

Family of algae

Goniaceae is a family of algae in the order Chlamydomonadales, that includes the genera Astrephomene and Gonium. Members of the Goniaceae are distinguished from those of the Volvocaceae by having each cell surrounded by a tripartite boundary of the extracellular matrix, as opposed to the entire colony being surrounded by the tripartite boundary in Volvocaceae. Goniaceae is the sister group to Volvocaceae.
