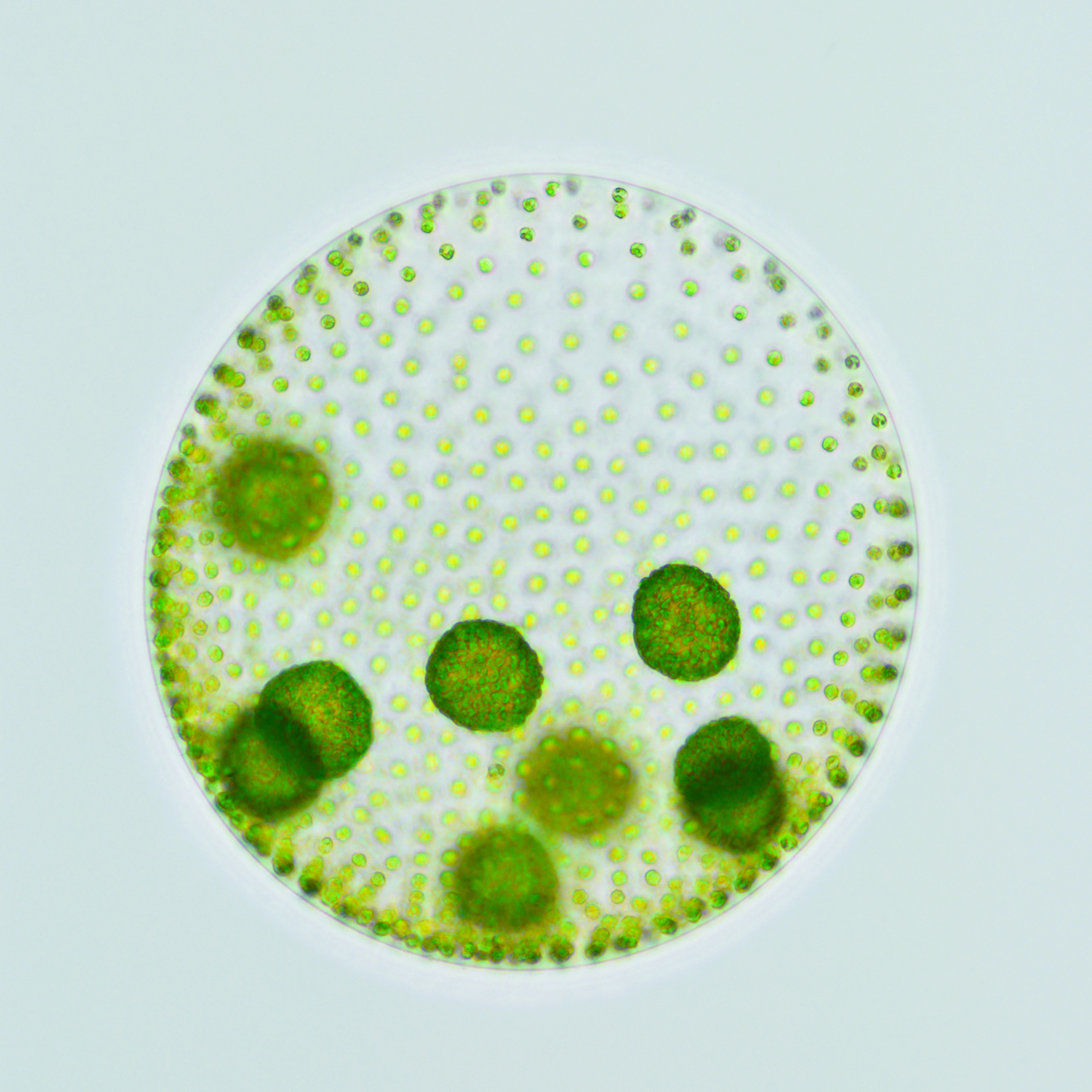

Scientific classification
- Kingdom: Plantae
- Division: Chlorophyta
- Class: Chlorophyceae
- Order: Chlamydomonadales
- Family: Volvocaceae
- Genus: Volvox
- Species: V. aureus

Binomial name
- Volvox aureus Ehrenberg

= Volvox aureus =

Species of green algae

Volvox aureus is a species of colonial green algae in the family Volvocaceae. It is a freshwater alga with a cosmopolitan distribution, and is probably the most commonly reported species of the genus Volvox. It is common in lowland lakes, rivers, ponds, ditches, and puddles, and is most abundant in late summer.

== Description ==
Volvox aureus consists of motile, spherical colonies of cells, typically around 400–600 μm in diameter. Colonies contain approximately 500–3200 cells, arranged in one layer around the margin of a hollow sphere or ellipsoid. Cells are connected to each other by thin cytoplasmic strands, approximately the same thickness as the flagella. Cells are surrounded by a confluent gelatinous sheath of cells; the center of the colony has a homogeneous mass from which gelatinous strands radiate outward and connect with the inner layer of the colonial matrix. Within the colony, there are four to 12 gonidia irregularly distributed in the posterior half. Gonidia are 18–22 μm in diameter; these divide successively to form embryos 150–175 μm in diameter. During development, the cells of the embryo grow between cell divisions, and the rate of division is quite slow. Cell division is light-dependent.

=== Reproduction ===
Volvox aureus is typically dioecious, with individuals producing either male or female gametes, but not both. It may be heterothallic or homothallic. Male colonies are not much smaller than their asexual counterparts, about 330–360 μm long; they contain 1,000–5,000 cells and 600–1,000 antheridial (sperm) packets. Sperm packets are plate-like, 15–18 μm in diameter, producing 32 sperm cells. Female colonies are about 340–415 μm long and have 7–21 (usually 10–14) eggs. Zygotes are 38–62 μm in diameter, with a smooth cell wall. Immature zygotes are green, while mature ones are orange.

In homothallic strains of Volvox aureus, male colonies can produce a glycoprotein pheromone which induces sexual differentiation, leading to the mass development of further male individuals. However, it appears that in nature, zygotes are rarely formed; instead, the dominant resting stage is a parthenospore formed by gonidia without division or fertilization.

== Taxonomy ==
Volvox aureus is part of the section Janetosphaera. In Volvox sect. Janetosphaera, individual cells are surrounded by a confluent gelatinous sheath (as opposed to individual gelatinous sheaths around each cell). In addition, colonies have a gelatinous strands radiating from the center to the periphery.

The vegetative morphology of Volvox aureus is very similar to Volvox pocockiae, the other species of Volvox sect. Janetosphaera. Unlike V. aureus, cells of V. pocockiae are not connected to each other by cytoplasmic strands in the anterior half. Also, in V. pocockiae the gonidia enlarge before cell division, while in V. aureus the gonidia do not enlarge. Finally, male spheroids of V. pocockiae are markedly smaller than their asexual and female counterparts. Volvox pocockiae is known only from a single collection in Mexico. However, because most reports of Volvox aureus have not been based on reproductive characters, it is possibly overlooked.
