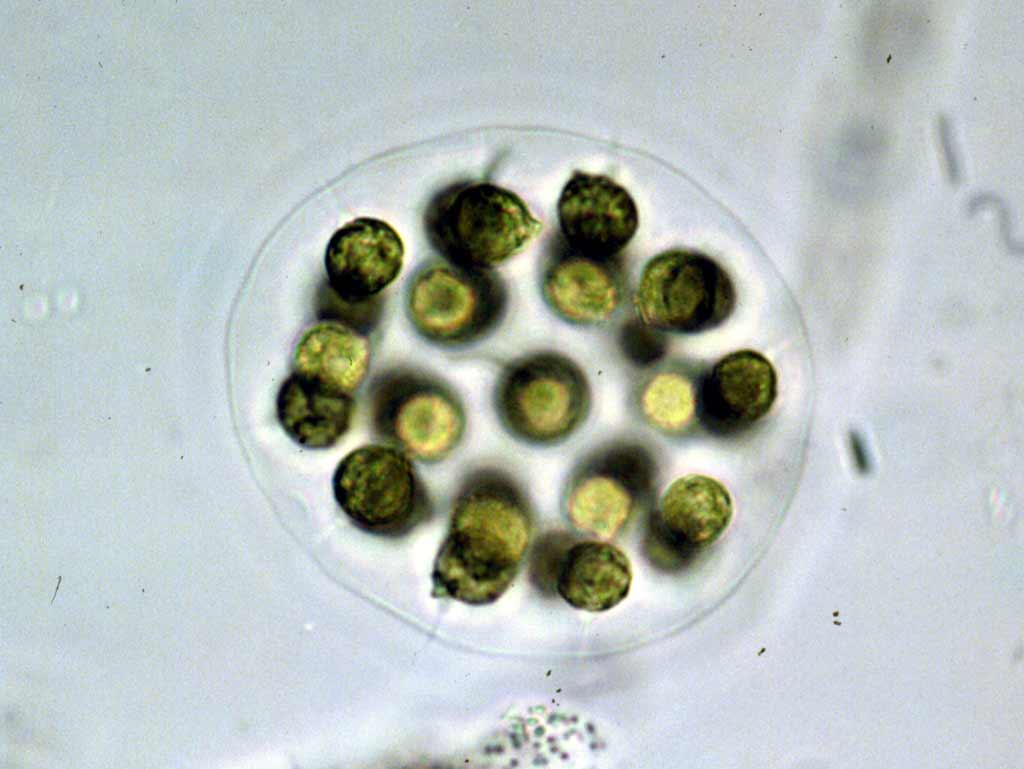

Scientific classification
- Kingdom: Plantae
- Division: Chlorophyta
- Class: Chlorophyceae
- Order: Chlamydomonadales
- Family: Volvocaceae
- Genus: Eudorina
- Species: E. elegans

Binomial name
- Eudorina elegans Ehrenberg

= Eudorina elegans =

Species of green algae

Eudorina elegans is a species of green algae in the family Volvocaceae, and is the type species of the genus Eudorina. It was first described in 1832 by Christian Gottfried Ehrenberg.

Eudorina elegans is the most common species of volvocine algae, and also one the most commonly encountered species of green algae. It is cosmopolitan in freshwater. It is particularly common on clay or calcareous soils associated with nutrient enrichment. In the spring and fall months, it can form blooms of up to 3,000 cells per mL.

== Description ==
Eudorina elegans consists of spherical, ellipsoidal or ovate colonies with 16, 32 or 64 cells. Cells are positioned near the periphery of the colony in several tiers, forming a more or less hollow spheroid; the colony is surrounded by a smooth gelatinous envelope (the posterior end may be flattened or mammillate). Cells are more or less equal in size, or the anterior ones may be somewhat smaller. Mature cells are spherical or ovoid in shape, and have two equal flagella. In each cell there are two apical contractile vacuoles (right below the flagella), and generally several more scattered contractile vacuoles. There is a single cup-shaped, longitudinally striated chloroplast which has at least three, equally-sized, randomly distributed pyrenoids. Eyespots are largest in the anterior tier of cells, and progressively become smaller in subsequent posterior tiers (or lacking in the last tier).

=== Reproduction ===
Eudorina elegans can reproduce asexually or sexually. In asexual reproduction, cells undergo successive divisions to form a curved plate called a plakea, which then undergoes a process of inversion to reorient the flagella.

Sexual reproduction is anisogamous. In the typical variety, var. elegans, the colonies are dioecious and all cells of a colony develop into either sperm packets (male) or eggs (female), but not both. Additionally, there are two monoecious varieties, var. carteri and var. synoica. In var. carteri, only the anterior cells develop into sperm packets while the posterior cells serve as eggs. In var. synoica, the cells forming sperm packets are randomly distributed throughout the colony.

=== Identification ===
Eudorina elegans is similar to other species of Eudorina. It primarily differs from other members of Eudorina in having the combination of following traits:

- Cells of the colony equal in size or nearly so (compare E. illinoisensis)
- Cells not surrounded by individual gelatinous sheaths (compare E. interconnexa, E. conradii)
- Colonies spherical to ellipsoidal (compare E. cylindrica)
- Colonies not covered with short conical projections (compare E. echidna)
- Mature cells with multiple, equal-sized and randomly distributed pyrenoids (compare E. unicocca including E. peripheralis)
- Cells lack tubular structures (flagellar sheaths) surrounding flagella (compare E. minodii)

== Phylogeny ==
Some strains of Eudorina elegans are more closely related to other species in the genus than to E. elegans itself; therefore, the species as currently circumscribed is polyphyletic.
