= Tetrabaena =

- Tetrabaena socialis swimming

Scientific classification
- Kingdom: Plantae
- Division: Chlorophyta
- Class: Chlorophyceae
- Order: Chlamydomonadales
- Family: Tetrabaenaceae
- Genus: Tetrabaena; Fromentel
- Species: T. socialis

Binomial name
- Tetrabaena socialis (Dujardin) H.Nozaki & M.Itoh

Synonyms
- Cryptomonas socialis Dujardin 1841; Gonium sociale (Dujardin) Warming 1876; Tetrabaena dujardinii Fromentel 1874; heterotypic; Tetragonium lacustre West & G.S.West 1896; heterotypic

Genus of green algae

Tetrabaena is a monotypic genus of green algae containing the species Tetrabaena socialis. It primarily occurs in freshwater, although it has been found in saltwater on at least one occasion. Although rare, it has a cosmopolitan distribution and has even been found from Antarctica.

== Description ==
Tetrabaena are colonial organisms, consisting of four cells. The four cells are arranged in a square, and attached to each other by the extensions of their cellular sheaths. Cells are ovoid, somewhat asymmetrical in shape. It is a motile flagellate, possessing two equal flagella per cell and two contractile vacuoles at the base of the flagella. Cells also contain a single cup-shaped chloroplast with a basal pyrenoid. Although Tetrabaena possess an eyespot, it does not appear to function as a photoreceptor.

Tetrabaena are capable of sexual reproduction, and are isogamous.

== Research significance ==
Tetrabaena is a member of the order Chlamydomonadales, a model lineage used in the study of the origins of multicellular organisms from single-celled ancestors. Within Chlamydomonadales, it is notable for being the colonial species with the smallest number of cells (4), placing it at the boundary between single- and multi-cellularity. As such, it has been characterized as the "simplest integrated multicellular organism."

Genomic data and molecular clock analysis suggest that Tetrabaena socialis may contain cryptic species.
