= Gonidium =

Asexual reproductive cell or group of cells

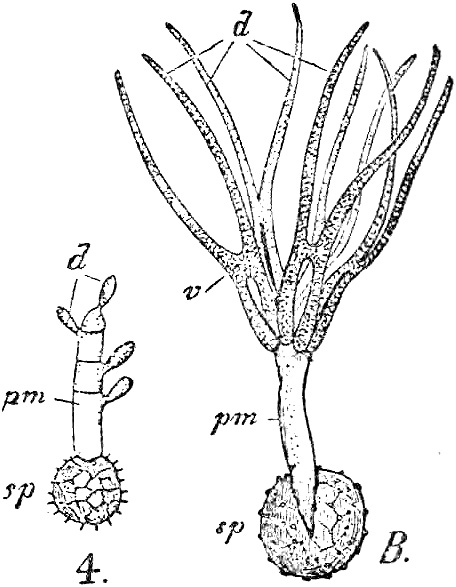
Germinating Resting-Gonidia: A (appears as "4") is of Ustilago receptaculorum; B is of Tilletia Caries. sp denotes the gonidium; pm, the promycelium; and d, the sporidia: in B the sporidia have coalesced in pairs at v.

A gonidium (plural gonidia) is an asexual reproductive cell or group of cells, especially in algae.
