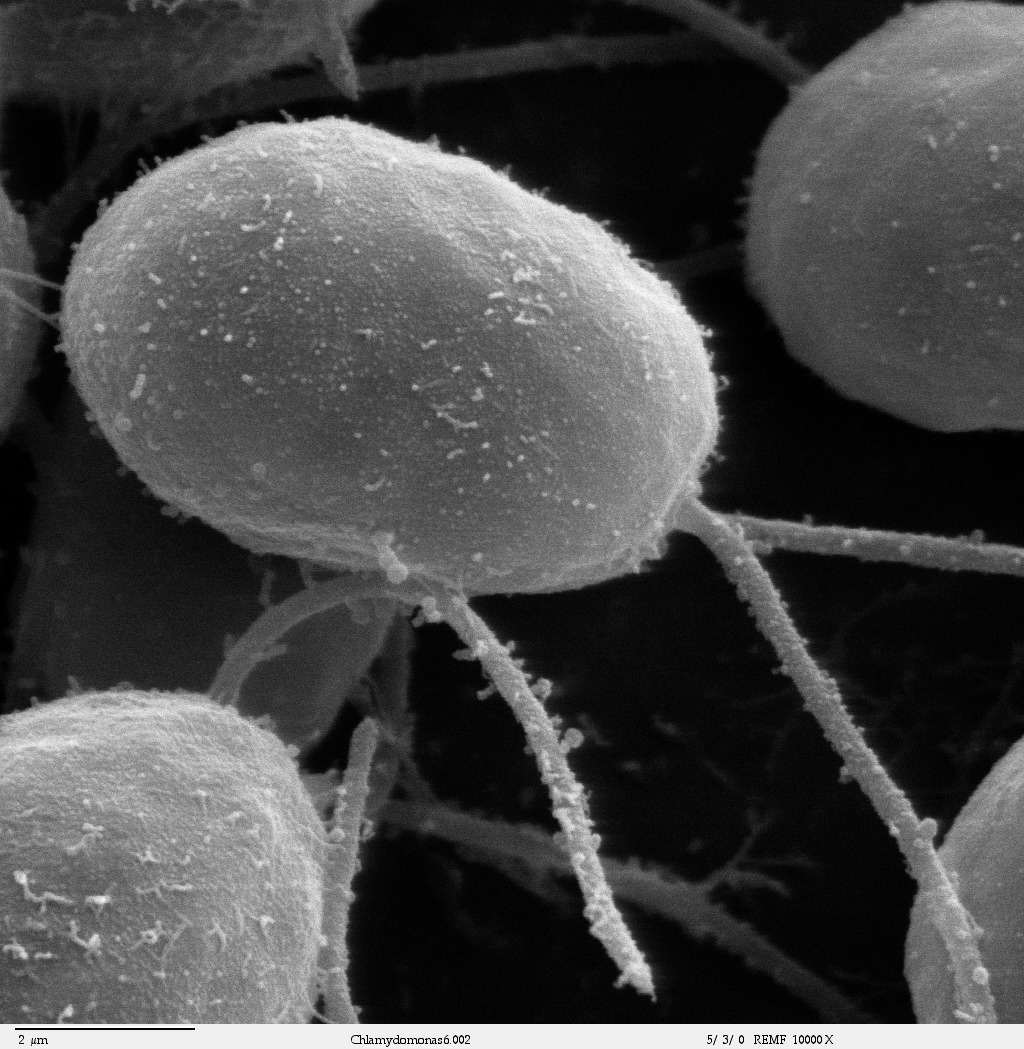
- SEM image of flagellated Chlamydomonas (10,000×)

Scientific classification
- Domain: Eukaryota
- Clade: Archaeplastida
- Clade: Viridiplantae
- Division: Chlorophyta
- Class: Chlorophyceae
- Order: Chlamydomonadales
- Family: Chlamydomonadaceae
- Genus: Chlamydomonas; Ehrenb.

Species
- See text

= Chlamydomonas =

Genus of algae

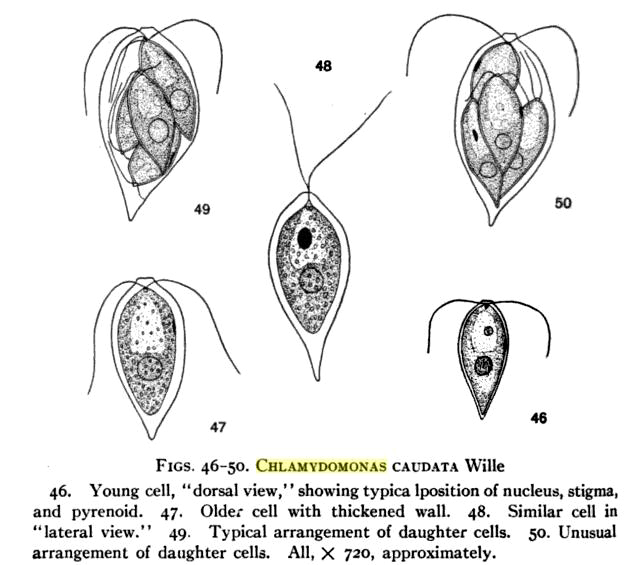
Drawings of Chlamydomonas caudata Wille.

Cross section of a Chlamydomonas reinhardtii cell

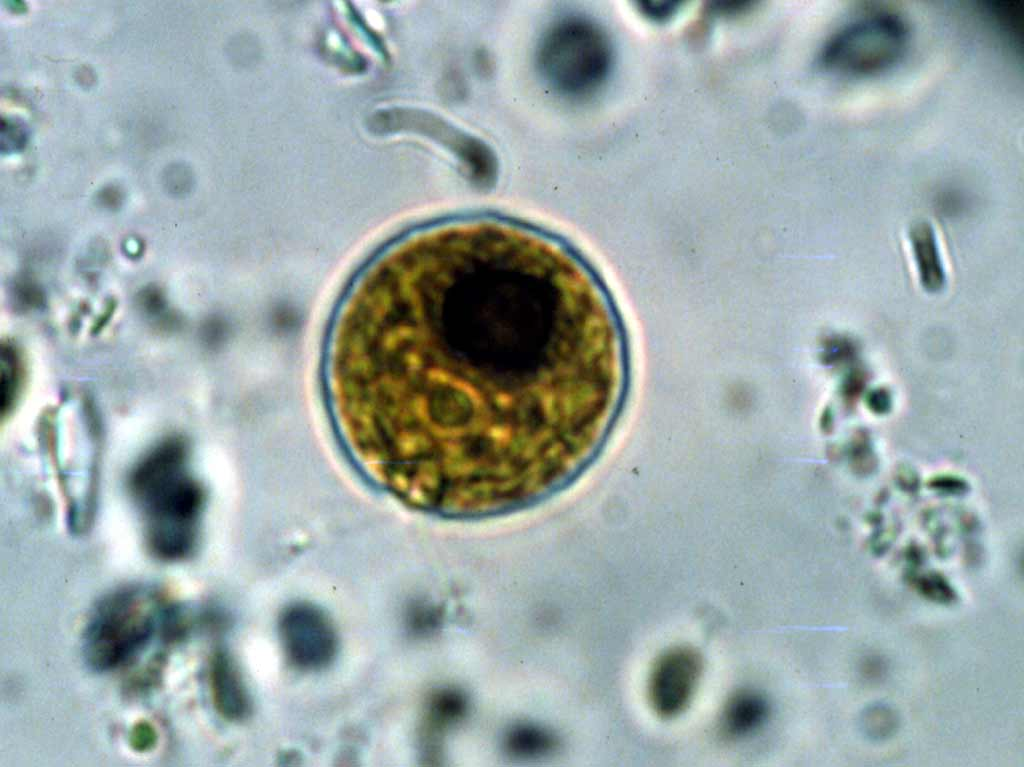
Light micrograph of Chlamydomonas with two flagella just visible at bottom left

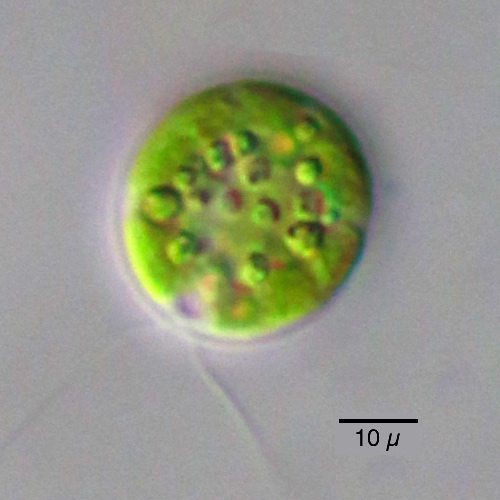
Chlamydomonas globosa, again with two flagella just visible at bottom left

Chlamydomonas (/ˌklæmɪˈdɒmənəs, -dəˈmoʊ-/ KLAM-ih-DOM-ə-nəs, -də-MOH-) is a genus of green algae consisting of about 150 species of unicellular flagellates, found in stagnant water and on damp soil, in freshwater, seawater, and even in snow as "snow algae". Chlamydomonas is used as a model organism for molecular biology, especially studies of flagellar motility and chloroplast dynamics, biogenesis, and genetics. One of the many striking features of Chlamydomonas is that it contains ion channels (channelrhodopsins) that are directly activated by light. Some regulatory systems of Chlamydomonas are more complex than their homologs in Gymnosperms, with evolutionarily related regulatory proteins being larger and containing additional domains.

Molecular phylogeny studies indicated that the traditional genus Chlamydomonas as defined using morphological data, was polyphyletic within Volvocales. Many species were subsequently reclassified (e.g., Oogamochlamys, Lobochlamys), and many other "Chlamydomonas" s.l. lineages are still to be reclassified.

== Etymology ==
The name Chlamydomonas comes from the Greek roots chlamys, meaning cloak or mantle, and monas, meaning solitary, now used conventionally for unicellular flagellates.

== Description ==
=== Morphology ===
All Chlamydomonas are motile, unicellular organisms. Cells are generally spherical to cylindrical in shape, but may be elongately spindle-shaped, and a papilla may be present or absent. Chloroplasts are green and usually cup-shaped. A key feature of the genus is its two anterior flagella, each as long as the other. The flagellar microtubules may each be disassembled by the cell to provide spare material to rebuild the other's microtubules if they are damaged.

- Cell wall is made up of a glycoprotein and non-cellulosic polysaccharides instead of cellulose.
- Two anteriorly inserted whiplash flagella. Each flagellum originates from a basal granule in the anterior papillate or non-papillate region of the cytoplasm. Each flagellum shows a typical 9+2 arrangement of the component fibrils.
- Contractile vacuoles are near the bases of flagella.
- Prominent cup or bowl-shaped chloroplast is present. The chloroplast contains bands composed of a variable number of the photosynthetic thylakoids which are not organised into grana-like structures.
- The nucleus is enclosed in a cup-shaped chloroplast, which has a single large pyrenoid where starch is formed from photosynthetic products. Pyrenoid with starch sheath is present in the posterior end of the chloroplast.
- Eye spot present in the anterior portion of the chloroplast. It consists of two or three, more or less parallel rows of linearly arranged fat droplets.

== Species ==
About 500 species of Chlamydomonas have been described.

- Chlamydomonas acidophila
- Chlamydomonas caudata Wille
- Chlamydomonas ehrenbergii Gorozhankin
- Chlamydomonas elegans G.S.West 1915
- Chlamydomonas moewusii
- Chlamydomonas muriella J.W.G.Lund 1947
- Chlamydomonas nivalis
- Chlamydomonas ovoidae
- Chlamydomonas priscuii
- Chlamydomonas smithii
- Chlamydomonas reinhardtii

== Ecology ==
Chlamydomonas is widely distributed in freshwater or damp soil. It is generally found in a habitat rich in ammonium salt. It possesses red eye spots for photosensitivity and reproduces both asexually and sexually.

Chlamydomonas's asexual reproduction occurs by zoospores, aplanospores, hypnospores, or a palmella stage, while its sexual reproduction is through isogamy, anisogamy or oogamy.

== Nutrition ==
Most species are obligate phototrophs but C. reinhardtii and C. dysostosis are facultative heterotrophs that can grow in the dark in the presence of acetate as a carbon source.

== Uses ==
Some Chlamydomonas are edible.

== See also ==
- Intraflagellar transport
- Chlamydomonas moewusii
