= List of Mamiellophyceae genera =

This is a list of genera in the green algae class Mamiellophyceae, sub-divided by order and family. The list is based on the data available in AlgaeBase, the Integrated Taxonomic Information System (ITIS), the National Center for Biotechnology Information taxonomic database (NCBI), and other taxonomic databases.

== Order Dolichomastigales ==
- Family Crustomastigaceae
  - Crustomastix
- Family Dolichomastigaceae
  - Dolichomastix
  - Microrhizoidea

== Order Mamiellales ==
- Family Bathycoccaceae
  - Bathycoccus
  - Ostreococcus
- Family Mamiellaceae
  - Mamiella
  - Mantoniella
  - Micrinomonas
  - Micromonas

== Order Monomastigales ==
- Family Monomastigaceae
  - Monomastix
