= List of eukaryotic picoplankton species =

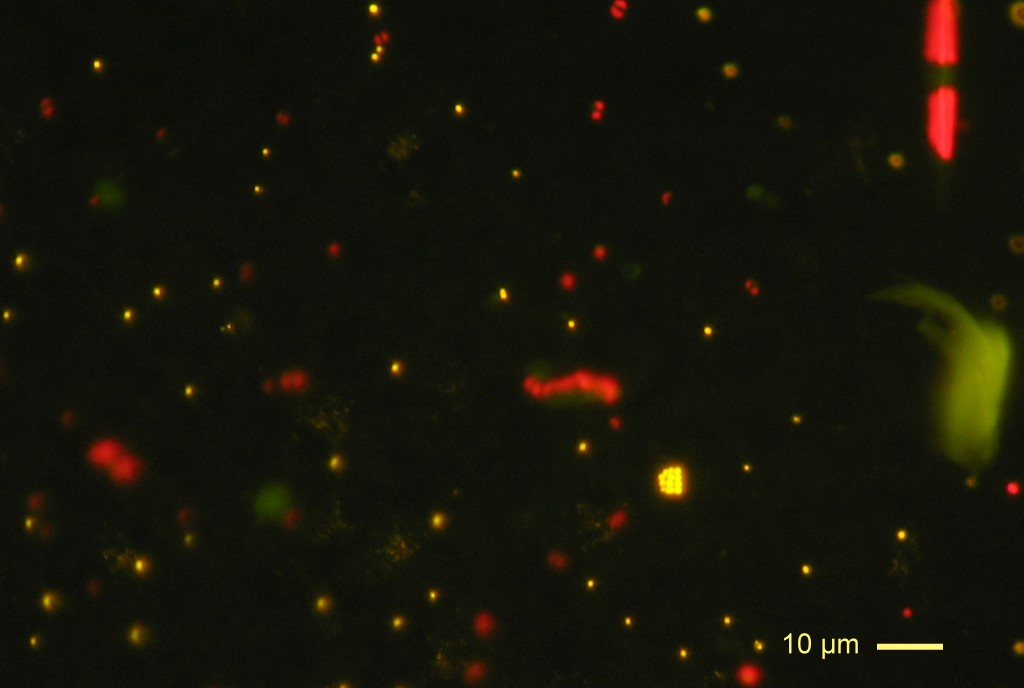
Photosynthetic picoplankton from the Pacific Ocean (off the Marquesas Islands observed by epifluorescence microscopy (blue exciting light). Orange fluorescing dots correspond to Synechococcus cyanobacteria, red fluorescing dots to picoeukaryotes. Larger cells (e.g. diatom, upper right) can also be seen.

List of eukaryotic species that belong to picoplankton, meaning one of their cell dimensions is smaller than 3 μm.

== Autotrophic species ==
=== Prasinodermophyta ===
- Prasinococcus capsulatus Miyashita et Chihara, 3 – 5.5 μm, marine
- Prasinoderma coloniale Hasegawa et Chihara, 2.5 – 5.5 μm, marine

=== Chlorophyta ===
==== Chlorophyceae ====
- Stichococcus cylindricus Butcher, 3 – 4.5 μm, brackish

==== Pedinophyceae ====
- Marsupiomonas pelliculata Jones et al., 3 – 3 μm, brackish-marine
- Resultor micron Moestrup, 1.5 – 2.5 μm, marine

==== Mamiellophyceae ====
- Bathycoccus prasinos Eikrem et Throndsen, 1.5 – 2.5 μm, marine
- Crustomastix stigmatica Zingone, 3 – 5 μm, marine
- Dolichomastix lepidota Manton, 2.5 – 2.5 μm, marine
- Dolichomastix eurylepidea Manton, 3 μm, marine
- Dolichomastix tenuilepis Throndsen et Zingone, 3 – 4.5 μm, marine
- Mantoniella squamata Desikachary, 3 – 5 μm, marine
- Micromonas pusilla Manton et Parke, 1 – 3 μm, marine
- Ostreococcus tauri Courties et Chrétiennot-Dinet, 0.8 – 1.1 μm, marine
- Picocystis salinarum Lewin, 2 – 3 μm, hypersaline

==== Pyramimonadophyceae ====
- Pseudoscourfieldia marina Manton, 3 – 3.5 μm, marine
- Pycnococcus provasolii Guillard, 1.5 – 4 μm, marine
- Pyramimonas virginica Pennick, 2.7 – 3.5 μm, marine

==== Trebouxiophyceae ====
- Chlorella nana Andreoli et al., 1.5 – 3 μm, marine
- Picochlorum oklahomensis Henley et al., 2 – 2 μm, hypersaline
- Picochlorum atomus Henley et al., 2 – 3 μm, brackish
- Picochlorum eukaryotum Henley et al., 3 – 3 μm, marine
- Picochlorum maculatus Henley et al., 3 – 3 μm, brackish

=== Cryptophyta ===
==== Cryptophyceae ====
- Hillea marina Butcher, 1.5 – 2.5 μm, marine

=== Haptophyta ===
==== Prymnesiaceae ====
- Chrysochromulina tenuisquama Estep et al., 2 – 5 μm, marine
- Chrysochromulina minor Parke et Manton, 2.5 – 7.5 μm, marine
- Chrysochromulina apheles Moestrup et Thomsen, 3 – 4 μm, marine
- Dicrateria inornata Parke, 3 – 5.5 μm, marine
- Ericiolus spiculiger Thomsen, 3 – 3.8 μm, marine
- Imantonia rotunda Reynolds, 2 – 4 μm, marine
- Phaeocystis cordata Zingone, 3 – 4 μm, marine
- Phaeocystis pouchetii Lagerheim, 3 – 8 μm, marine
- Trigonaspis minutissima H.A.Thomsen, 2 – 3.6 μm, marine

=== Heterokontophyta (Stramenopiles) ===
==== Bacillariophyceae ====
- Minidiscus comicus Takano, 2 – 7 μm, marine
- Minidiscus trioculatus Hasle, 2.5 – 3.8 μm, marine
- Minidiscus spinulosus Gao, Chang et Chin, 3 – 5 μm, marine
- Minidiscus chilensis Rivera, 3 – 7.5 μm, marine
- Minutocellus polymorphus Hasle, von Stosch et Syverstsen, 2 – 30 μm, marine
- Minutocellus scriptus Hasle, von Stosch et Syverstsen, 3 – 36 μm, marine
- Skeletonema menzelii Guillard, Carpenter et Reimann, 2 – 7 μm, marine
- Skeletonema pseudocostatum Medlin, 2 – 9 μm, marine
- Skeletonema japonicum Zingone et Sarno, 2 – 10 μm, marine
- Skeletonema grethae Zingone et Sarno, 2 – 10.5 μm, marine
- Skeletonema marinoi Sarno et Zingone, 2 – 12 μm, marine
- Thalassiosira pseudonana Hasle et Heimdal, 2.3 – 5.5 μm, marine

==== Bolidophyceae ====
- Bolidomonas pacifica Guillou et Chrétiennot-Dinet, 1 – 1.7 μm, marine
- Bolidomonas mediterranea Guillou et Chrétiennot-Dinet, 1 – 1.7 μm, marine

==== Chrysophyceae ====
- Ollicola vangoorii Conrad (Vors), 2.5 – 5 μm, marine
- Tetraparma pelagica Booth et Marchant, 2.2 – 2.8 μm, marine
- Tetraparma insecta Bravo-Sierra et Hernández-Becerril, 2.8 – 3.8 μm, marine
- Triparma laevis Booth, 2.2 – 3.1 μm, marine
- Triparma columacea Booth, 2.3 – 4.7 μm, marine
- Triparma retinervis Booth, 2.7 – 4.5 μm, marine

==== Dictyochophyceae ====
- Florenciella parvula Eikrem, 3 – 6 μm, marine

==== Eustigmatophyceae ====
- Nannochloropsis granulata Karlson et Potter, 2 – 4 μm, marine
- Nannochloropsis salina Hibberd, 3 – 4 μm, brackish
- Nannochloropsis oceanica Suda et Miyashita, 3 – 5 μm, marine

==== Pelagophyceae ====
- Aureococcus anophagefferens Hargraves et Sieburth, 1.5 – 2 μm, marine
- Aureoumbra lagunensis Stockwell et al., 2.5 – 5 μm, marine
- Pelagococcus subviridis Norris, 2.5 – 5.5 μm, marine
- Pelagomonas calceolata Andersen et Saunders, 2 – 3 μm, marine

==== Pinguiophyceae ====
- Pinguiochrysis pyriformis Kawachi, 1 – 3 μm, marine
- Pinguiococcus pyrenoidosus Andersen et al., 3 – 8 μm, marin

== Heterotrophic species ==
=== Cercozoa ===
==== Cercomonadida ====
- Massisteria marina Larsen et Patterson, 2.5 – 6.5 μm, marine

==== Plasmodiophorida ====
- Phagomyxa odontellae Kühn, Schnepf & Bulman, 3 – 4 μm, marine

=== Stramenopiles ===
==== Bicosoecida ====
- Caecitellus parvulus Patterson et al., 3 – 10 μm, marine
- Pseudobodo minima Ruinen, 2 μm, marine
- Symbiomonas scintillans Guillou et Chrétiennot-Dinet, 1.2 – 1.5 μm, marine

==== Chrysophyceae ====
- Paraphysomonas imperforata Lucas, 1.7 – 5.1 μm, marine
- Paraphysomonas corbidifera Pennick and Clarke, 2 – 3.25 μm, marine
- Paraphysomonas antarctica Takahashi, 2 – 4.3 μm, marine
- Paraphysomonas caelifrica Preisig and Hibberd, 2.5 – 5 μm, marine
- Paraphysomonas cribosa Lucas, 3 – 4 μm, marine
- Paraphysomonas sideriophora Thomsen, 3 – 5 μm, marine
- Paraphysomonas capreolata Preisig and Hibberd, 3 – 6.5 μm, marine
- Paraphysomonas gladiata Preisig and Hibberd, 3 – 8 μm, marine
- Picophagus flagellatus Guillou et Chrétiennot-Dinet, 1.4 – 2.5 μm, marine
