= Photosynthetic picoplankton =

Group of photosynthetic plankton

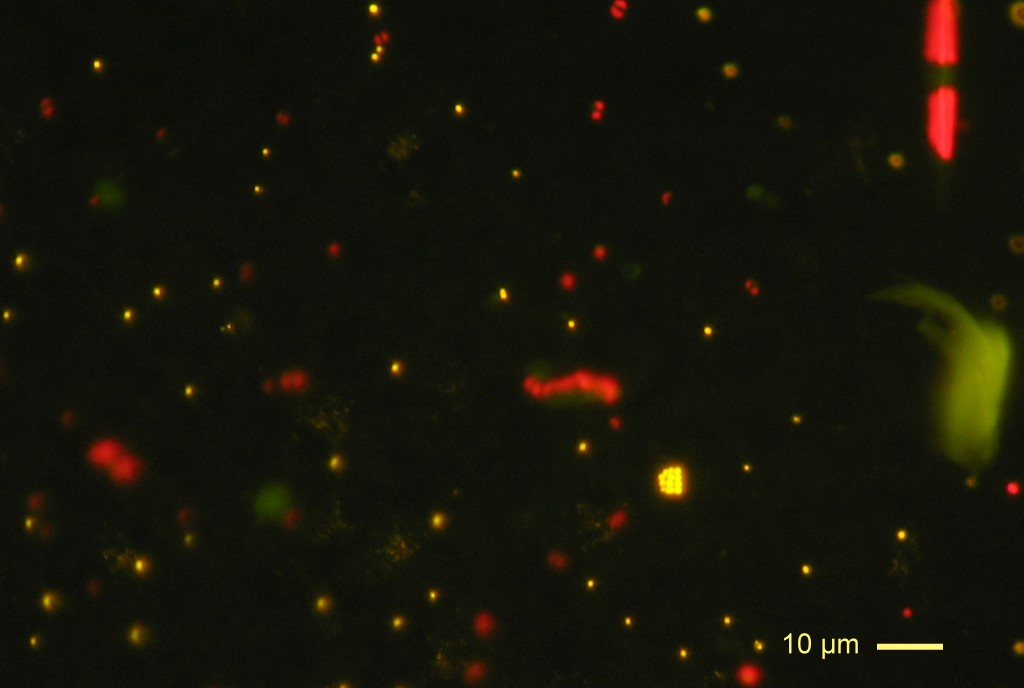
Picoplankton observed by epifluorescence

Photosynthetic picoplankton or picophytoplankton is the fraction of the photosynthetic phytoplankton of cell sizes between 0.2 and 2 μm (i.e. picoplankton). It is especially important in the central oligotrophic regions of the world oceans that have very low concentration of nutrients.

== History ==
- 1952: Description of the first truly picoplanktonic species, Chromulina pusilla, by Butcher. This species was renamed in 1960 to Micromonas pusilla and a few studies have found it to be abundant in temperate oceanic waters, although very little such quantification data exists for eukaryotic picophytoplankton.
- 1979: Discovery of marine Synechococcus by Waterbury and confirmation with electron microscopy by Johnson and Sieburth.
- 1982: The same Johnson and Sieburth demonstrate the importance of small eukaryotes by electron microscopy.
- 1983: W.K.W Li and colleagues, including Trevor Platt show that a large fraction of marine primary production is due to organisms smaller than 2 μm.
- 1986: Discovery of "prochlorophytes" by Chisholm and Olson in the Sargasso Sea, named in 1992 as Prochlorococcus marinus.
- 1994: Discovery in the Thau lagoon in France of the smallest photosynthetic eukaryote known to date, Ostreococcus tauri, by Courties.
- 2001: Through sequencing of the ribosomal RNA gene extracted from marine samples, several European teams discover that eukaryotic picoplankton are highly diverse. This finding followed on the first discovery of such eukaryotic diversity in 1998 by Rappe and colleagues at Oregon State University, who were the first to apply rRNA sequencing to eukaryotic plankton in the open-ocean, where they discovered sequences that seemed distant from known phytoplankton The cells containing DNA matching one of these novel sequences were recently visualized and further analyzed using specific probes and found to be broadly distributed.

== Methods of study ==
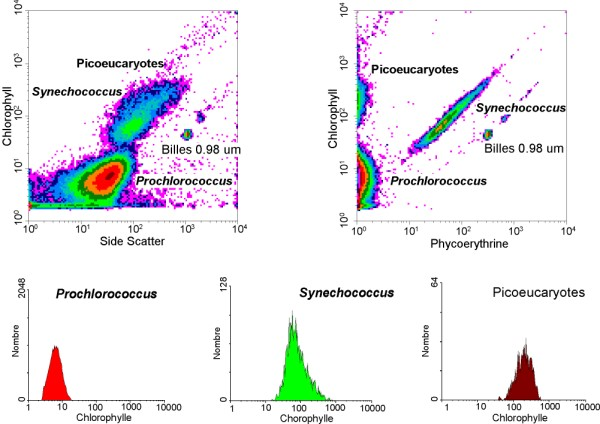
Analysis of picoplankton by flow cytometry

Because of its very small size, picoplankton is difficult to study by classic methods such as optical microscopy. More sophisticated methods are needed.

- Epifluorescence microscopy allows researchers to detect certain groups of cells possessing fluorescent pigments such as Synechococcus which possess phycoerythrin.
- Flow cytometry measures the size ("forward scatter") and fluorescence of 1,000 in 10,000 cells per second. It allows one to determine very easily the concentration of the various picoplankton populations on marine samples. Three groups of cells (Prochlorococcus, Synechococcus and picoeukaryotes) can be distinguished. For example Synechococcus is characterized by the double fluorescence of its pigments: orange for phycoerythrin and red for chlorophyll. Flow cytometry also allows researchers to sort out specific populations (for example Synechococcus) in order put them in culture, or to make more detailed analyses.
- Analysis of photosynthetic pigments such as chlorophyll or carotenoids by high precision chromatography (HPLC) allows researchers to determine the various groups of algae present in a sample.
- Molecular biology techniques:

- Cloning and sequencing of genes such as that of ribosomal RNA, which allows researchers to determine total diversity within a sample
- Denaturing gradient gel electrophoresis (DGGE) that is faster than the previous approach allows researchers to have an idea of the global diversity within a sample
- Fluorescent in situ hybridization (FISH) uses fluorescent probes recognizing specific taxon, for example a species, a genus or a class. This original description as a species is now thought to be composed of a number of different cryptic species, a finding that has been confirmed by a genome sequencing project of two strains led by researchers at the Monterey Bay Aquarium Research Institute.
- Quantitative PCR can be used to determine the abundance of specific groups. It has the main advantage of allowing the rapid analysis of a large number of samples simultaneously, but requires more sophisticated controls and calibrations.

== Composition ==
Three major groups of organisms constitute photosynthetic picoplankton:

- Cyanobacteria belonging to the genus Synechococcus of a size of 1 μm (micrometer) were first discovered in 1979 by J. Waterbury (Woods Hole Oceanographic Institution). They are quite ubiquitous, but most abundant in relatively mesotrophic waters.
- Cyanobacteria belonging to the genus Prochlorococcus are particularly remarkable. With a typical size of 0.6 μm, Prochlorococcus was discovered only in 1988 by two American researchers, Sallie W. (Penny) Chisholm (Massachusetts Institute of Technology) and R.J. Olson (Woods Hole Oceanographic Institution). In spite of its small size, this photosynthetic organism is undoubtedly the most abundant of the planet: indeed its density can reach up to 100 million cells per liter and it can be found down to a depth of 150 m in all the intertropical belt.
- Picoplanktonic eukaryotes are the least well known, as demonstrated by the recent discovery of major groups. Andersen created in 1993 a new class of brown algae, the Pelagophyceae. More surprising still, the discovery in 1994 of a eukaryote of very small size, Ostreococcus tauri, dominating the phytoplanktonic biomass of a French brackish lagoon (étang de Thau), shows that these organisms can also play a major ecological role in coastal environments. In 1999, yet a new class of alga was discovered, the Bolidophyceae, very close genetically of diatoms, but quite different morphologically. At the present time, about 50 species are known belonging to several classes.

Algal classes containing picoplankton species
Classes	Picoplanktonic genera
Chlorophyceae	Nannochloris
Prasinophyceae	Micromonas, Ostreococcus, Pycnococcus
Prymnesiophyceae	Imantonia
Pelagophyceae	Pelagomonas
Bolidophyceae	Bolidomonas
Dictyochophyceae	Florenciella

The use of molecular approaches implemented since the 1990s for bacteria, were applied to the photosynthetic picoeukaryotes only 10 years later around 2000. They revealed a very wide diversity and brought to light the importance of the following groups in the picoplankton:

- Prasinophyceae
- Haptophyta
- Cryptophyta

In temperate coastal environment, the genus Micromonas (Prasinophyceae) seems dominant. However, in numerous oceanic environments, the dominant species of eukaryotic picoplankton remain still unknown.

== Ecology ==
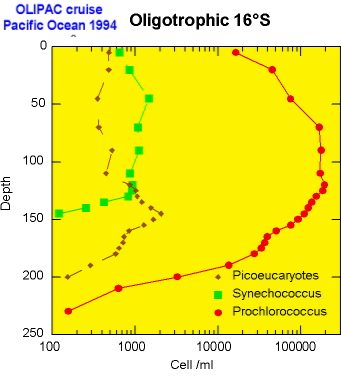
Vertical distribution of picoplankton in the Pacific Ocean

Each picoplanktonic population occupies a specific ecological niche in the oceanic environment.

- The Synechococcus cyanobacterium is generally abundant in mesotrophic environments, such as near the equatorial upwelling or in coastal regions.
- The Prochlorococcus cyanobacterium replaces it when the waters becomes impoverished in nutrients (i.e., oligotrophic). On the other hand, in temperate regions such as the North Atlantic Ocean, Prochlorococcus is absent because the cold waters prevent its development.
- The diversity of eukaryotes derives from their presence in a large variety of environments. In oceanic regions, they are often observed at depth, at the base of the well-lit layer (the "euphotic" layer). In coastal regions, certain sorts of picoeukaryotes such as Micromonas dominate. As with larger plankton, their abundance follows a seasonal cycle with a maximum in summer.

Thirty years ago, it was hypothesized that the speed of division for micro-organisms in central oceanic ecosystems was very slow, of the order of one week or one month per generation. This hypothesis was supported by the fact that the biomass (estimated for example by the contents of chlorophyll) was very stable over time. However, with the discovery of the picoplankton, it was found that the system was much more dynamic than previously thought. In particular, small predators of a size of a few micrometres which ingest picoplanktonic algae as quickly as they were produced were found to be ubiquitous. This extremely sophisticated predator-prey system is nearly always at equilibrium and results in a quasi-constant picoplankton biomass. This close equivalence between production and consumption makes it extremely difficult to measure precisely the speed at which the system turns over.

In 1988, two American researchers, Carpenter and Chang, suggested estimating the speed of cell division of phytoplankton by following the course of DNA replication by microscopy. By replacing the microscope by a flow cytometer, it is possible to follow the DNA content of picoplankton cells over time. This allowed researchers to establish that picoplankton cells are highly synchronous: they replicate their DNA and then divide all at the same time at the end of the day. This synchronization could be due to the presence of an internal biological clock.

== Genomics ==
In the 2000s, genomics allowed to cross a supplementary stage. Genomics consists in determining the complete sequence of genome of an organism and to list every gene present. It is then possible to get an idea of the metabolic capacities of the targeted organisms and understand how it adapts to its environment. To date, the genomes of several types of Prochlorococcus and Synechococcus, and of a strain of Ostreococcus have been determined. The complete genomes of two different Micromonas strains revealed that they were quite different (different species) and had similarities with land plants. Several other cyanobacteria and of small eukaryotes (Bathycoccus, Pelagomonas) are under sequencing. In parallel, genome analyses begin to be done directly from oceanic samples (ecogenomics or metagenomics), allowing us to access to large sets of gene for uncultivated organisms.

Genomes of photosynthetic picoplankton strains that have been sequenced to date
Genus	Strain	Sequencing center	Remark
Prochlorococcus	MED4	JGI	
	SS120	Genoscope	
	MIT9312	JGI	
	MIT9313	JGI	
	NATL2A	JGI	
	CC9605	JGI	
	CC9901	JGI	
Synechococcus	WH8102	JGI	
	WH7803	Genoscope	
	RCC307	Génoscope	
	CC9311	TIGR	
Ostreococcus	OTTH95	Genoscope	
Micromonas	RCC299 and CCMP1545	JGI	

== See also ==
- Bacterioplankton
- List of eukaryotic picoplankton species
- Nanophytoplankton
- Phytoplankton
- Picoeukaryote

== Bibliography ==
Cyanobacteria

- Zehr, J. P., Waterbury, J. B., Turner, P. J., Montoya, J. P., Omoregie, E., Steward, G. F., Hansen, A. & Karl, D. M. 2001. Unicellular cyanobacteria fix N2 in the subtropical North Pacific Ocean. Nature 412:635-8

Eukaryotes

- Butcher, R. 1952. Contributions to our knowledge of the smaller marine algae. J. Mar. Biol. Assoc. UK. 31:175-91.
- Manton, I. & Parke, M. 1960. Further observations on small green flagellates with special reference to possible relatives of Chromulina pusilla Butcher. J. Mar. Biol. Assoc. UK. 39:275-98.
- Eikrem, W., Throndsen, J. 1990. The ultrastructure of Bathycoccus gen. nov. and B. prasinos sp. nov., a non-motile picoplanktonic alga (Chlorophyta, Prasinophyceae) from the Mediterranean and Atlantic. Phycologia 29:344-350
- Chrétiennot-Dinet, M. J., Courties, C., Vaquer, A., Neveux, J., Claustre, H., et al. 1995. A new marine picoeucaryote: Ostreococcus tauri gen et sp nov (Chlorophyta, Prasinophyceae). Phycologia 34:285-292
- Sieburth, J. M., M. D. Keller, P. W. Johnson, and S. M. Myklestad. 1999. Widespread occurrence of the oceanic ultraplankter, Prasinococcus capsulatus (Prasinophyceae), the diagnostic "Golgi-decapore complex" and the newly described polysaccharide "capsulan". J. Phycol. 35: 1032-1043.
- Not, F., Valentin, K., Romari, K., Lovejoy, C., Massana, R., Töbe, K., Vaulot, D. & Medlin, L. K. 2007. Picobiliphytes, a new marine picoplanktonic algal group with unknown affinities to other eukaryotes. Science 315:252-4.
- Vaulot, D., Eikrem, W., Viprey, M. & Moreau, H. 2008. The diversity of small eukaryotic phytoplankton (≤3 μm) in marine ecosystems. FEMS Microbiol. Rev. 32:795-820.

Ecology

- Platt, T., Subba-Rao, D. V. & Irwin, B. 1983. Photosynthesis of picoplankton in the oligotrophic ocean. Nature 300:701-4.
- Stomp M, Huisman J, de Jongh F, Veraart AJ, Gerla D, Rijkeboer M, Ibelings BW, Wollenzien UIA, Stal LJ. 2004. Adaptive divergence in pigment composition promotes phytoplankton biodiversity. Nature 432: 104-107.
- Campbell, L., Nolla, H. A. & Vaulot, D. 1994. The importance of Prochlorococcus to community structure in the central North Pacific Ocean. Limnol. Oceanogr. 39:954-61.

Molecular Biology and Genomes

- Rappé, M. S., P. F. Kemp, and S. J. Giovannoni. 1995. Chromophyte plastid 16S ribosomal RNA genes found in a clone library from Atlantic Ocean seawater. J. Phycol. 31: 979-988.
