= Bathycoccus prasinos =

Scientific classification
- Kingdom: Plantae
- Division: Chlorophyta
- Class: Mamiellophyceae
- Order: Mamiellales
- Family: Bathycoccaceae
- Genus: Bathycoccus
- Species: B. prasinos

Binomial name
- Bathycoccus prasinos Eikrem & Throndsen

Species of alga

Bathycoccus prasinos is a photosynthetic picoplankton belonging to the order Mamiellales, along with Ostreococcus and Micromonas. The cells are around 1–2 μm in length, are non-motile and are covered in scales.

== Genome ==
The small genome (15 Mb) was recently sequenced and many of the genes are related to plants, though there is significant horizontal gene transfer from other eukaryotes. There are 19 chromosomes, two of which have a significantly different GC-content.
