= Ostreococcus tauri =

- Transmission electron micrograph of an O. tauri cell

Scientific classification
- Clade: Viridiplantae
- Division: Chlorophyta
- Class: Mamiellophyceae
- Order: Mamiellales
- Family: Bathycoccaceae
- Genus: Ostreococcus
- Species: O. tauri

Binomial name
- Ostreococcus tauri C. Courties & M.-J. Chrétiennot-Dinet (1995)

Species of alga

Ostreococcus tauri is a unicellular species of marine green alga about 0.8 micrometres (μm) in diameter, the smallest free-living (non-symbiotic) eukaryote yet described. It has a very simple ultrastructure, and a compact genome.

As a common member of global oceanic picoplankton populations, this organism has a major role in the carbon cycle in many areas and often uses light receptors called phototropins to sense external light. Recently, O. tauri has been the subject of studies using comparative genomics and functional genomics, as it is of interest to researchers because of its compact genome and green lineage.

== History ==
Ostreococcus tauri was discovered in 1994 in the Thau lagoon, France, in a year-long study of the picoplankton population of the lagoon using flow cytometry. O. tauri was found to be the main component of the picoplankton population in the lagoon, and images of cells produced by transmission electron microscopy revealed the smallest yet described free-living eukaryotic cells. O. tauri was immediately placed in the class Prasinophyceae based on the presence of characteristic chlorophyll pigments and Chlorophyceae-related carotenoids. However, it has been classified together with its order Mamiellales into an own class, Mamiellophyceae meanwhile (Marin and Melkonian, 2010).

== Anatomy ==
Cells are roughly spherical (coccoid), averaging about 1 μm long by 0.7 μm wide. The cell's ultrastructure is very simple, lacking a cell wall and consisting of a nucleus, a single mitochondrion, a single chloroplast, and a single Golgi apparatus. Cells also lack flagella.

Initially described as containing 14 chromosomes, it is now known that the nucleus contains 20 chromosomes, in all about 33 fg of DNA.

== Ecology ==
Ostreococcus tauri is the dominant algal species, by cell abundance, in the Thau Lagoon in the south of France. The conditions that are thought to lead to this dominance are firstly that the Lagoon is used for intensive mollusc cultivation, and secondly that copper levels in the Lagoon are high. The first consideration selects for smaller cells (picoplankton); larger eukaryotic species of alga and many predators of smaller algae are preferentially consumed by the molluscs, which are filter feeders. The second consideration selects against cyanobacteria, as O. tauri is thought to cope better with "adverse conditions". The excess copper in the lagoon is thought to originate from agricultural chemicals used by surrounding vineyards.

== Use as a model organism ==
As early as 1998, O. tauri was identified as "a good candidate for biological models such as cell division and/or genome sequencing studies".

== Cryptic sex ==
When grown in the laboratory, O. tauri cells are haploid. Although no sexual life cycle has been described, the occurrence of cryptic sex is indicated by the expression of core genes for meiosis. Sexual exchanges, as indicated by formation of genetic recombinants, appear to occur, but are infrequent.

== Genomics ==
In 2006, the O. tauri genome was sequenced by Derelle et al. The 12.56 Mb genome organized in 20 chromosomes showed extreme gene density and few intron-containing genes. Two chromosomes with outlying characteristics (G+C content, intron structure) were identified, namely chromosome 2 and chromosome 19. Sequencing of other species of the Mamiellales order showed occurrence of similar outlying chromosomes in other species (O. lucimarinus, Micromonas pusilla & B. prasinos). The mitochondrial genome consist of 44,237 base pairs and 65 genes, and the chloroplast genome of 71,666 base pairs and 86 genes.
