= William Li (oceanographer) =

Canadian biological oceanographer (born 1952)

- 李國為
- Born: Li Kwok Wai; 1952 (age 73–74); British Hong Kong
- Other name: Bill Li
- Citizenship: Canadian
- Education: Dalhousie University (PhD); University of British Columbia (BSc)
- Awards: APICS-Fraser Medal (1986); ASLO John Martin Award (2014)
- Scientific career
- Fields: Marine microbial ecology
- Workplaces: Bedford Institute of Oceanography

William Li (Chinese: 李國為; born 1952) is a Canadian biological oceanographer known for his research on marine picoplankton, marine macroecology, ocean surveys of plankton from measurements of flow cytometry, and detection of multi-annual ecological change in marine phytoplankton.

== Early life and education ==
Li was born in 1952 in British Hong Kong and became a citizen of Canada by naturalization in 1973. His paternal grandfather was Li Tse-fong. His maternal grandfather was O. K. Yui. His primary education was at Kuang Chi School in Manila, and at the Diocesan Boys’ School in Kowloon. His secondary education was at St. Paul’s Co-Educational College in Hong Kong, and at Lord Byng Secondary School in Vancouver.

Li received his BSc. at the University of British Columbia where he studied under Timothy R. Parsons. He received his PhD at Dalhousie University where he studied under Robert O. Fournier and was influenced by Gordon Riley, amongst others. Li undertook postdoctoral training at the Bigelow Laboratory for Ocean Sciences under Ian Morris, and also at the Woods Hole Oceanographic Institution under Joel C. Goldman.

== Research ==
Li was in the early vanguard of oceanographers who recognized the importance of photosynthetic picoplankton in ocean primary production. He was also one of a small group of ocean-going flow cytometrists who contemporaneously discovered the existence of extremely abundant very small red-autofluorescing cells in the ocean, later shown to be Prochlorococcus. Li affirmed these findings by shipboard flow cytometric sorting of living phytoplankton cells labelled with radioactive carbon as a demonstration that bulk primary production could be recovered by a summation of measured contribution from phytoplankton constituents. Notably, the putative existence of these very small chlorophyll-bearing cells had been predicted by Li's co-author John Cullen in their multi-authored 1983 paper in which the deduction of "invisible photoautotrophs" was made based on "excess chlorophyll" as one possibility to reconcile the biomass budget of phytoplankton in the tropical Pacific Ocean

Li developed methods and ideas that tried to integrate flow cytometric measurements of ocean microbes within general ecological concepts, eventually into what he called cytometric macroecology. In collaboration with Eddy Carmack, Fiona McLaughlin, Connie Lovejoy, and others, Li showed that this approach was useful in documenting changes in the ecology of plankton microbes in the Arctic Ocean as the waters there warm and freshen

In 1992, Li established an oceanographic monitoring station in the Bedford Basin of Halifax Harbour as a sentinel for long-term change in the pelagic environment of coastal waters in Atlantic Canada. The Bedford Basin Monitoring Program was designed to make weekly measurements of selected properties that characterize the physical, chemical, biological and optical environments of the water column. In time, this ocean monitoring site came to be regarded as the inshore terminus ("station zero") of the Halifax Line of the Atlantic Zone Monitoring Program, a comprehensive shelf-wide oceanographic monitoring of Atlantic Canada. Using the long-term observations from Bedford Basin as a template, Li and Xosé Anxelu G. Morán established the Working Group on Phytoplankton and Microbial Ecology of the International Council for the Exploration of the Sea, one of whose goals was to report on large-scale patterns of phytoplankton change across the North Atlantic Ocean. In 2004, Daniel Vaulot and Li initiated the first Gordon Research Conference on Marine Microbes, which was held at the Station Biologique de Roscoff (France) on the topic of picophytoplnkton.

== Career ==
As a research scientist for 35 years (1980-2015) in the Department of Fisheries and Oceans at the Bedford Institute of Oceanography, Li witnessed and engaged in many of the seminal scientific achievements in plankton ecology that took place under the institutional leadership of Alan Longhurst, Kenneth Mann, Michael Sinclair, Trevor Platt, and others. At various points in his career, Li served on the editorial boards of the international journals Limnology and Oceanography, Marine Ecology Progress Series, Aquatic Microbial Ecology, and Journal of Plankton Research. At other various times in his career, Li was appointed as faculty member to the Faculty of 1000, and as adjunct professor at Dalhousie University and Université Laval.

In retirement, Li served as the President of the A.G. Huntsman Foundation, which administers the A.G. Huntsman Award for Excellence in the Marine Sciences. Li also serves on the curriculum committee of the Seniors’ College Association of Nova Scotia.

== Awards ==
In 1986, Li was awarded the APICS-Fraser Medal for Outstanding Achievement in Science and Engineering, Atlantic Provinces Council on the Sciences. The citation for this award noted that "Li's work has created an important new body of knowledge on growth measurement and the effects of temperature changes on plankton".

In 2014, Li and co-authors were awarded the John Martin Award for recognition of a paper in aquatic sciences that is judged to have had a high impact on subsequent research in the field.
