= Robert Fournier =

American-born Canadian biological oceanographer (born 1939)

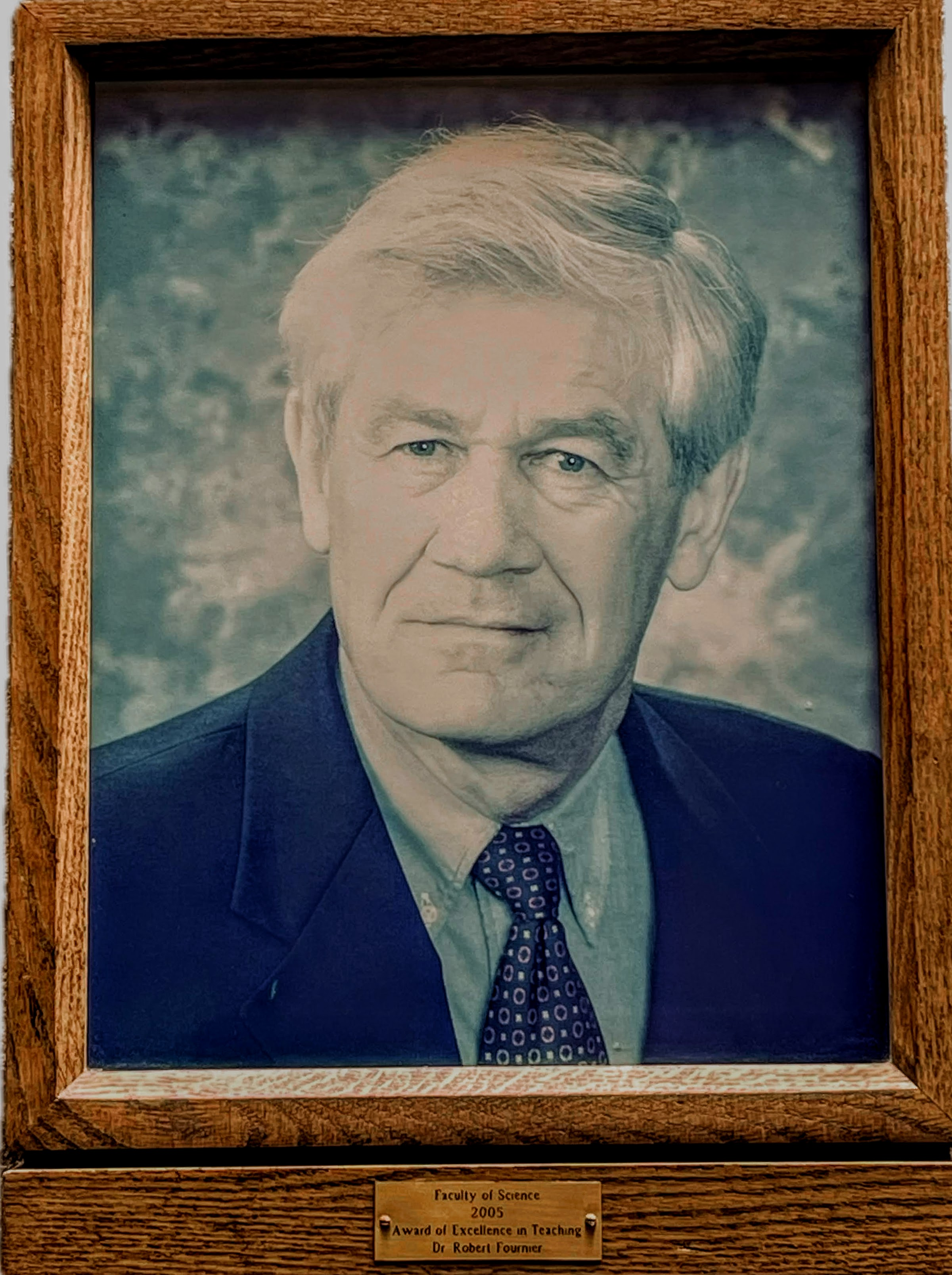
- Robert Fournier in 2005
- Born: 29 October 1939; Massachusetts, USA
- Died: 10 December 2023 (aged 84); Timberlea, Nova Scotia
- Other name: Bob Fournier
- Known for: CBC Radio Information Morning science commentator
- Scientific career
- Fields: Oceanography, Science Communication
- Institutions: Dalhousie University

Robert Omer Fournier (October 29, 1939 – December 10, 2023) was an American-born Canadian biological oceanographer, science educator, university administrator, and public science communicator. At Dalhousie University, he served as Professor of Oceanography, Chair of the Department of Oceanography, and Associate Vice-president (Academic). His research focused on marine plankton productivity and the dynamics of continental shelf ecosystems, particularly on the Scotian Shelf. He was also widely known across Canada for his long-running science commentaries on CBC Radio and CBC Television.

== Early life and education ==
Fournier was born in Fall River, Massachusetts on October 29, 1939, and grew up in Providence, Rhode Island. He earned a BSc degree in ecology from the University of Rhode Island in 1961, followed by an MA degree in Biological Oceanography from the College of William and Mary in 1963 under the supervision of Bernard Patten. He returned to the University of Rhode Island, receiving a PhD in Biological Oceanography in 1967 under the supervision of Theodore Smayda. Following completion of his doctorate, he was awarded a National Science Foundation Postdoctoral Fellowship (1967–68) which he held at the University of Oslo, Norway (with Trygve Braarud), and at the Plymouth Marine Laboratory in England (with Mary Parke). Subsequently, he held a postdoctoral fellowship at Dalhousie University (1968–69) with Gordon Riley.

== Academic career ==
Fournier's first appointment was assistant professor of botany at the University of Hawaii. After two years, he returned to Dalhousie University in 1971, where he remained for the rest of his academic career. He progressed through the academic ranks to become Professor of Oceanography and later Chair of the Department of Oceanography. Afterwards, he was appointed vice-president at Dalhousie University, first as Assistant VP and later as Associate VP, positions that he held until 1999. Following his retirement in 2005, he was named professor emeritus and subsequently served as Interim Director of the Dalhousie Marine Affairs Program.

Fournier's research during his doctoral and postdoctoral years focused on an enigmatic type of deep-sea pigmented microorganism (termed olive-green cells) found throughout the dark ocean below the photic zone. At Dalhousie University, he turned his attention to primary production processes on the Scotian Shelf and adjacent northwest Atlantic waters. His studies contributed to understanding the relationships among ocean circulation, nutrient dynamics, and biological production in shelf ecosystems.

Fournier's graduate students included Patricia L. Johansen, William K.W. Li, Leonard S. Mukai, Donald J. Douglas, N. Brent Hargreaves, Richard J. Geider, William P. Cochlan, Suzanne Roy, and Claire E.A. Carver.

== Public service and administration ==
Beyond his scientific research, Fournier played a prominent role in science policy and public administration in Canada. He served on many national, and provincial advisory bodies and review panels. These included the Intergovernmental Oceanographic Commission, the Canadian National Committee for SCOR (Scientific Committee on Oceanic Research), the Fisheries and Oceans Research Advisory Committee, Joint Public Review for the Sable Gas Project, the Ocean Production Enhancement Network (National Centre of Excellence), the Nova Scotia Electricity Marketplace Governance Committee, the Halifax Harbour Cleanup Task Force, the Nova Scotia Council of Applied Science and Technology, the Nova Scotia Universities Technology Transfer Consortium (NU-TECH), the Premier's Energy Council, the Nova Scotia Economic Strategy Committee, and others.

In 1989, as a response to the need to mitigate the discharge of untreated sewage into Halifax Harbour, the province of Nova Scotia appointed Fournier to chair the Halifax Harbour Task Force, with terms of references to (1) recommend harbour use objectives related to environmental quality; (2) examine existing engineering and scientific information; (3) identify important information gaps and recommend studies needed to fill them; (4) recommend, where appropriate, outfall siting criteria, treatment levels or other strategies; and (5) achieve the above goals with public participation. The final report of the task force ("The Fournier Report") was delivered to the Minister of the Environment in August 1990.

== Science communication ==
Fournier became one of Canada's most recognizable science communicators through his extensive work with the Canadian Broadcasting Corporation. Beginning in the 1970s, he provided regular science commentaries on CBC Radio and Television programs including Morningside, Midday, This Country in the Morning, and CBC Newsworld Morning Program. Fournier's science commentary every Wednesday on CBC-Halifax Information Morning radio program started in 1978 and ended 40 years later. He delivered more than 1,500 media presentations over the course of his career.

== Death ==
Fournier died at his home in Timberlea, Nova Scotia, on December 10, 2023, aged 84.

== Selected Publications ==
• Fournier, R. O. (1966). North Atlantic deep-sea fertility. Science, 153(3741), 1250–1252.

• Fournier Robert O. (1970), Studies on pigmented microorganisms from aphotic marine environments. Limnology and Oceanography, 15(5):675-682, doi: 10.4319/lo.1970.15.5.0675.

• Fournier Robert O. (1971), Studies on pigmented microorganisms from aphotic marine environments. II. North Atlantic distribution. Limnology and Oceanography, 16(6): 952–961, doi: 10.4319/lo.1971.16.6.0952.

• Fournier Robert O. (1973), Studies on pigmented microorganisms from aphotic marine environments. III. Evidenced of apparent utilization by benthic and pelagic tunicata. Limnology and Oceanography, 18(1): 38–43, doi: 10.4319/lo.1973.18.1.0038.

• Fournier, R. O. (1972). The Transport of Organic Carbon to Organisms living in the Deep Oceans. Proceedings of the Royal Society of Edinburgh, Section B: Biological Sciences, 73, 203–211.

• Mills, E.L., Fournier, R.O. Fish production and the marine ecosystems of the Scotian Shelf, eastern Canada. Mar. Biol. 54, 101–108 (1979). https://doi.org/10.1007/BF00386589

• Fournier, R. O., Marra, J., Bohrer, R., & Det, M. V. (1977). Plankton dynamics and nutrient enrichment of the Scotian Shelf. Journal of the Fisheries Board of Canada, 34(7), 1004–1018.

• Fournier, R. O., Det, M. V., Wilson, J. S., & Hargreaves, N. B. (1979). Influence of the shelf-break front off Nova Scotia on phytoplankton standing stock in winter. Journal of the Fisheries Board of Canada, 36(10), 1228–1237.

• Martı́nez, C. M., & Fournier, R. (1999). EcoPlata: an Uruguayan multi-institutional approach to integrated coastal zone management. Ocean & coastal management, 42(2–4), 165–185.
