= Picoeukaryote =

Picoplanktonic eukaryotic organisms 3.0 μm or less in size

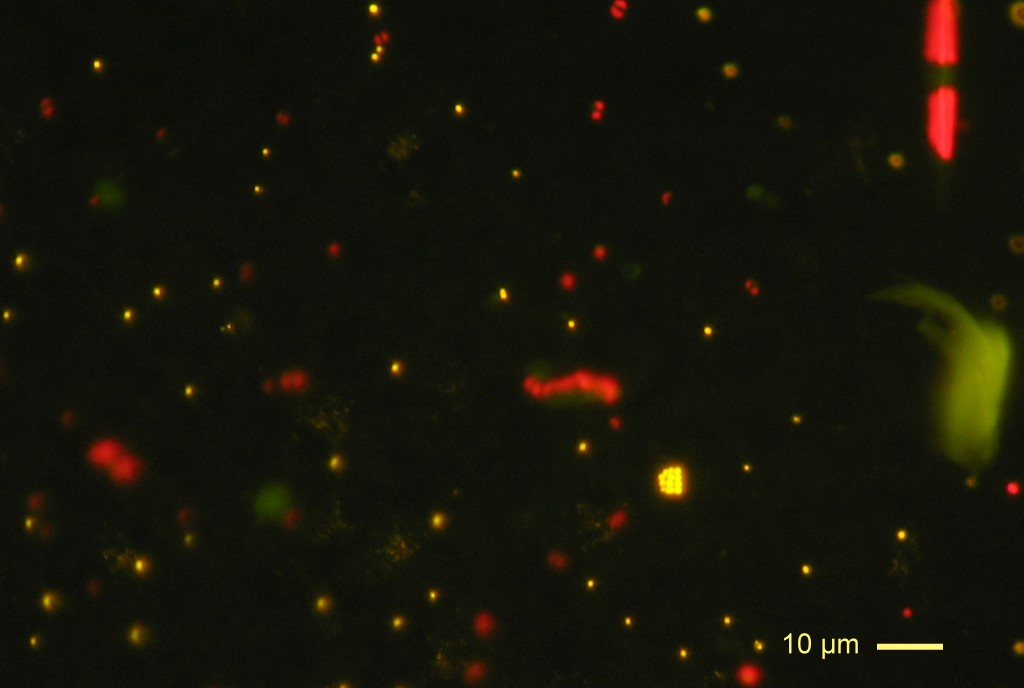
Photosynthetic picoplankton off the Marquesas Islands observed by epifluorescence microscopy (blue exciting light). Orange fluorescing dots correspond to Synechococcus cyanobacteria, red fluorescing dots to picoeukaryotes.

Picoeukaryotes are picoplanktonic eukaryotic organisms 3.0 μm or less in size. They are distributed throughout the world's marine and freshwater ecosystems and constitute a significant contribution to autotrophic communities. Though the SI prefix pico- might imply an organism smaller than atomic size, the term was likely used to avoid confusion with existing size classifications of plankton.

== Characteristics ==
=== Cell structure ===
Picoeukaryotes can be either autotrophic and heterotrophic, and usually contain a minimal number of organelles. For example, Ostreococcus tauri, an autotrophic picoeukaryote belonging to the class Mamiellophyceae, contains only the nucleus, one mitochondrion and one chloroplast, tightly packed within a cell membrane. Members of a heterotrophic class, the Bicosoecida, similarly contain only two mitochondria, one food vacuole and a nucleus.

=== Distributions ===
These organisms are found throughout the water columns. Autotrophic picoeukaryotes are restricted to the upper 100–200 m (the layer that receives light) and are often characterized by a sharp cell maximum near the Deep Chlorophyll Maximum Layer (DCML) and decrease significantly below. Heterotrophic groups are found at greater depths and for example, in the Pacific Ocean, they have been found in the vicinity of hydrothermal vents at depths up to 2000–2550 m. Some heterotrophic lineages are found, unstratified, at all depths from the surface down to 3000 m. They show high phylogenetic diversity and high variability in global cell concentrations, ranging from 10^{7} to 10^{5} liter^{−1}.

=== Diversity ===
Autotrophic picoeukaryotes commonly found in nature are members of groups such as the Prasinophyceae (a kind of green algae) and the Haptophyceae. Despite their small size, these organisms have been found to contribute >10% of the total global aquatic net primary productivity. Although much less abundant than cyanobacterial photosynthetic picoplankton, they have been shown to be as important in terms of biomass and primary production than picocyanobacteria. In more oligotrophic environments, such as Station ALOHA, researchers believe that approximately 80% of the chlorophyll α biomass is due to cells in the pico-size range. and picoeukaryotes are now known to make up a large fraction of the biomass and productivity in this size fraction in open ocean environments and even in exported carbon in the North Atlantic Bloom. Analysis of rDNA sequences indicate that heterotrophic oceanic picoeukaryotes belong to lineages such as the Alveolata, stramenopiles, choanoflagellates, and Acantharea. In these lineages, many groups do not have cultured representatives yet. Grazing experiments have demonstrated that novel stramenopile picoeukaryotes are bacterivorous.

== Ecology ==
Since the size of these organisms determines how they interact with their environment, it is no surprise that they are not known to form significant sinking organic aggregates. Their contribution to carbon cycling is difficult to assess because they are difficult to separate by techniques such as filtration. Recent fluorescent in situ hybridization (FISH) experiments have shown that picoeukaryotes are fairly abundant in the deep sea. Increased resolution with the development of better FISH techniques indicates that study and detection should become easier. Additionally, qPCR has been a valuable approach for delineating and quantifying the different species, e.g. oceanic and coastal Bathycoccus and Ostreococcus species. Research has also shown that picoeukaryotes have a strong correlation with chlorophyll concentrations in both meso-autotrophic reservoirs and hypereutrophic reservoirs. Moreover, nitrogen enrichment experiments suggest that picoeukaryotes have an advantage over larger cells when it comes to acquiring nutrients because of their large surface area per unit volume. They have exhibited more effectiveness in the uptake of photons and nutrient from low-resource environments.

== Biological characteristics ==
Photosynthetic picoeukaryotes, much like other planktonic species in the ocean photic zone, are exposed to light variations during the diel cycle and due to vertical displacement in the mixed layer of the water column. They have specialized biological reactions to help them deal with excessive densities of light, such as the Xanthophyll cycle. However, there are also many types of non-photosynthetic picoeukaryotes that extend into the deep ocean and do not have these biochemical pathways.

== See also ==
- Bacterioplankton
- List of eukaryotic picoplankton species
- Phytoplankton
- Picocyanobacteria
- Picozoa
