= TMEM69 =

Protein found in humans

Identifiers
- Aliases: TMEM69, C1orf154, transmembrane protein 69
- External IDs: MGI: 3045357; GeneCards: TMEM69

Gene location (Human)
Chr.	Chromosome 1 (human)
Band	1p34.1	Start	45,688,181 bp
Band	1p34.1	End	45,694,436 bp

Gene location (Mouse)
Chr.	Chromosome 4 (mouse)
Band	4|4 D1	Start	116,408,830 bp
Band	4|4 D1	End	116,413,133 bp
RNA expression pattern
Bgee	Human / Mouse (ortholog); Top expressed in: oocyte; secondary oocyte; pancreatic epithelial cell; myocardium of left ventricle; gonad; gingival epithelium; germinal epithelium; rectum; mucosa of ileum; cardiac muscle tissue of right atrium / Top expressed in: hand; lumbar subsegment of spinal cord; otolith organ; utricle; epiblast; right kidney; triceps brachii muscle; vastus lateralis muscle; tail of embryo; muscle of thigh; More reference expression data
BioGPS	n/a
Orthologs
Databases	NCBI: entry; OMA: entry
Species	Human	Mouse
Entrez	51249	230657
Ensembl	ENSG00000159596	ENSMUSG00000055900
UniProt	Q5SWH9	Q3KQJ0
RefSeq (mRNA)	NM_016486	NM_177670
RefSeq (protein)	NP_057570	NP_808338
Location (UCSC)	Chr 1: 45.69 – 45.69 Mb	Chr 4: 116.41 – 116.41 Mb
PubMed search
- Wikidata
View/Edit Human	View/Edit Mouse

TMEM69, also known as Transmembrane protein 69, is a protein that in humans is encoded by the TMEM69 gene. A notable feature of the protein encoded by TMEM69 is the presence of five transmembrane segments.

== Background information ==
Accession numbers	Location	Identifiers	M.W.	pI
mRNA: NM_016486.3 protein: NP_057570.2	1p34.1	HSPC229, C1orf154, FLJ21029, LOC51249	27.6 kDa	10.3

== Gene ==
The TMEM69 gene, located on chromosome 1p34.1, covers 7.24 kb. It is on the plus strand in the genomic sequence from 46152886 to 46160121 and encodes a primary mRNA transcript that contains 3 exons and is 6262 bp in length. Three alternative transcripts are predicted to encode the TMEM69 gene.

== Gene Neighborhood ==
Name of Gene	Location	Orientation	Function
GPBP1L1 (GC-rich promoter binding protein 1-like 1)	1p34.1	minus	Functions in regulation of transcription
CCDC17 (coiled-coil domain containing 17)	1p34.1	minus	No functional information found
MAST2 (microtubule associated serine/threonine kinase 2)	1p34.1	plus	Functions in a multi-protein complex in spermatid maturation. Regulates lipopolysaccharide-induced IL-12 synthesis in macrophages||
IPP (Intracisternal A particle-promoted polypeptide)	1p34-p32	minus	interacts with actin

== Function ==
The exact function of TMEM69 is not yet understood by the scientific community. It is, however, thought to play a role as a scaffolding protein in a G-coupled protein receptor complex in Xenopus tropicalis. It has been shown to form a cluster with the xtGPR54-2 gene IPP, and GPBP1 in scaffold_41. This complex is part of a G-coupled protein receptor which acts as the receptor for a binding ligand, kisspeptin in the plasma membrane of brain cells.

== Protein ==
TMEM69 is 247 amino acids in length. Five transmembrane segments are present as well as a domain of unknown function, DUF3429, which spans amino acids 91–232.

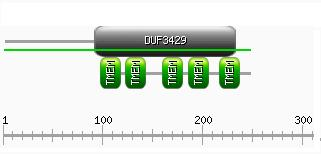

=== Predicted Features ===
Properties of TMEM69 that were predicted using Bioinformatics tools:

- Molecular Weight: 27.6 KDa.
- Isoelectric Point: 10.3
- Post-translational modification: Multiple phosphorylation sites are predicted from the NetPhos program on ExPASy . NetPhos predicted 7 for the amino acid serine at position 12, 27, 33, 85, 93, 183, and 234; 1 for threonine at position 26; and 2 for tyrosine at position 57 and 159. NetGlyc on ExPASy predicted 5 glycation sites at positions 7, 60, 73, 156, and 239.
- Transmembrane Segments: TMEM69 contains 5 transmembrane regions occurring at positions 97–117, 122–142, 159–179, 185–205, and 216–236.

== Expression ==
TMEM69 is expressed ubiquitously at low levels throughout the human body, although EST Profile data reveal that TMEM69 is expressed particularly high in neuroendocrine tissues such as the liver, amygdala, hippocampus, and hypothalamus. TMEM69 was found to be expressed in lower than normal values in patients suffering from atherosclerosis.

== Homology ==
=== Orthologs ===
The TMEM69 gene is deeply conserved in several life forms. Although it shows highest conservation among mammalian orthologs, along with other chordates such as fish, birds, and amphibians, there is some conservation in plants, insects, fungi, and bacteria.

Genus/Species	Organism Common Name	Accession number	Sequence identity	Length (AAs)
Macaca fascicularis	Crab-eating macaque	EHH61428.1	89%	246
Callithrix jacchus	Monkey	XP_002750811.1	83%	249
Mus musculus	House Mouse	AAI06179.1	69%	245
Xenopus tropicalis	Frog	NP_001016103.1	49%	253
Rattus norvegicus	Rat	EDL90276.1	70%	247
Oryctolagus cuniculus	Rabbit	XP_002715715	74%	250
Anolis carolinensis	Lizard	XP_003220264.1	50%	257
Danio rerio	Zebrafish	XP_685684.1	49%	249
Salmo salar	Salmon	NP_001134056.1	50%	259
Daphia pulex	Water flea	EFX84634.1	35%	208
Ostreococcus tauri	Green algae	XP_003081614.1	34%	166
Pseudomonas putida W619	Soil bacterium	YP_001748891.1	32%	152
Schizophyllum commune	Fungus	XP_003035659.1	27%	363

=== Paralogs ===
No paralogs were found for TMEM69.

== Conservation ==
TMEM69 is well conserved in a variety of organisms. Although most orthologs are found in placental mammals, some orthologs are found in bacteria and fungi. The most distant ortholog found to have sequence similarity with TMEM69 is Pseudomonas putida W619, which is a type of soil bacterium. Particularly well conserved in even the most distant orthologs, including Pseudomonas putida W619, is most of the second transmembrane segment of TMEM69. In strict orthologs, all five transmembrane domains are conserved. Conserved domains found within TMEM69 are part of DUF3429, which is a family of uncharacterized proteins found in bacteria and eukaryotes.
