= Dolichomastix =

Dolichomastix is the scientific name of two genera of organisms and may refer to:

- Dolichomastix (alga), a genus of green algae in the family Dolichomastigaceae
- Dolichomastix (wasp), a genus of wasps in the tribe Phygadeuontini
