= Crustomastix =

Scientific classification
- Kingdom: Plantae
- Division: Chlorophyta
- Class: Mamiellophyceae
- Order: Dolichomastigales
- Family: Crustomastigaceae
- Genus: Crustomastix; Nakayama, Kawachi & Inouye, 2000

Species
- C. didyma Nakayama, Kawachi & Inouye, 2000; C. stigmatica Zingone, 2002

Genus of algae

Crustomastix is a genus of green algae in the class Mamiellophyceae.
