= Bathycoccus =

Scientific classification
- Kingdom: Plantae
- Division: Chlorophyta
- Class: Mamiellophyceae
- Order: Mamiellales
- Family: Bathycoccaceae
- Genus: Bathycoccus; Eikrem & Throndsen 1990

Species
- Bathycoccus prasinos Eikrem & Throndsen 1990

Genus of algae

Bathycoccus is a genus of green algae in the order Mamiellales. It typically resides in oceanic waters, specifically coastal waters. The Bathycoccus algae initially was isolated at 100m from the deep chlorophyll maximum (DCM) in the Mediterranean Sea. It has since been found to be widespread across the ocean, in particularly nutrient rich waters.
