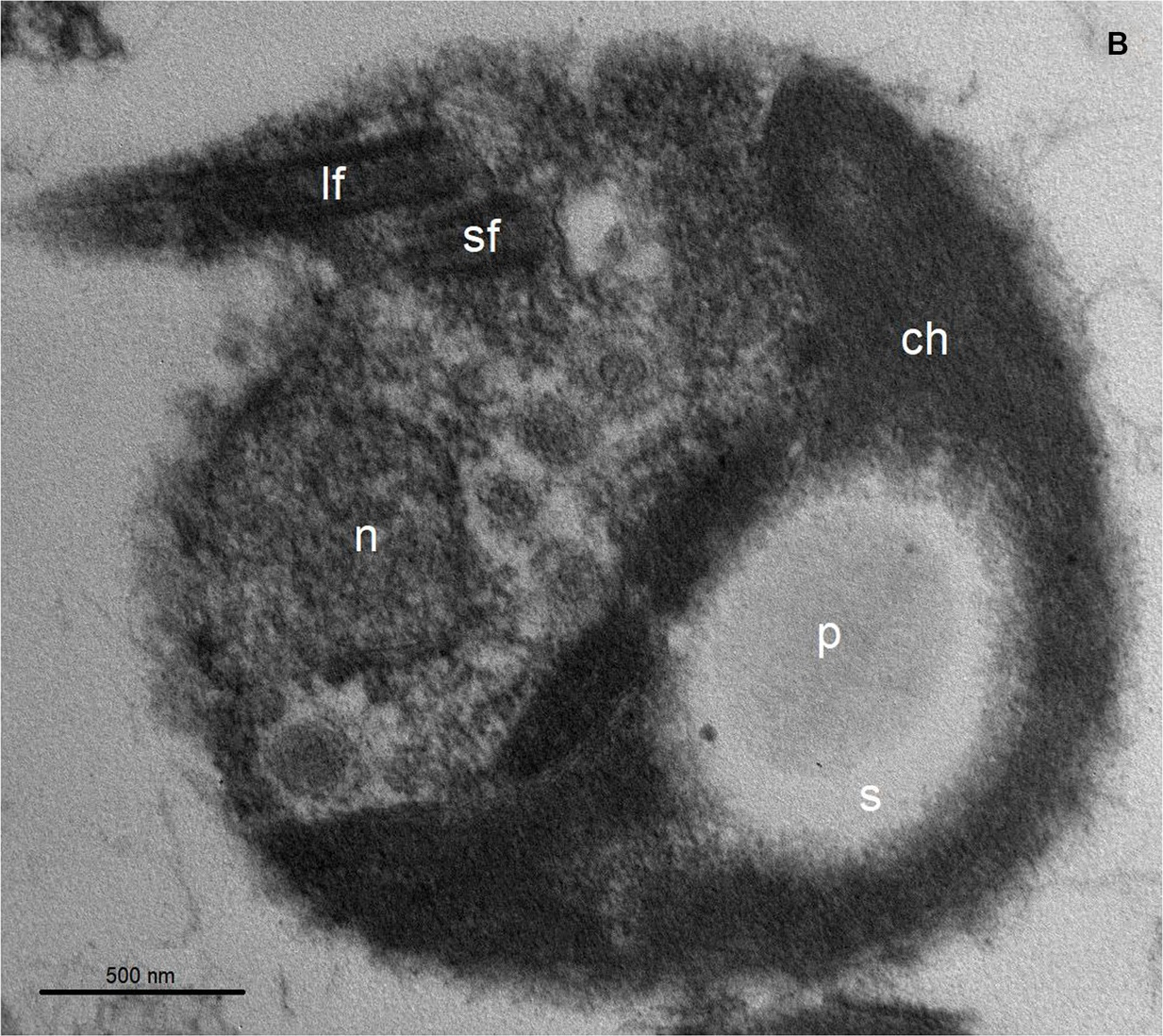
- TEM image of Mantoniella tinhauana

Scientific classification
- Kingdom: Plantae
- Division: Chlorophyta
- Class: Mamiellophyceae
- Order: Mamiellales
- Family: Mamiellaceae
- Genus: Mantoniella; Desikachary 1972

Species
- Mantoniella antarctica Marchant 1989; Mantoniella squamata (Manton & Parke 1960) Desikachary 1973

= Mantoniella =

Genus of algae

Mantoniella is a genus of green algae in the family Mamiellaceae.
