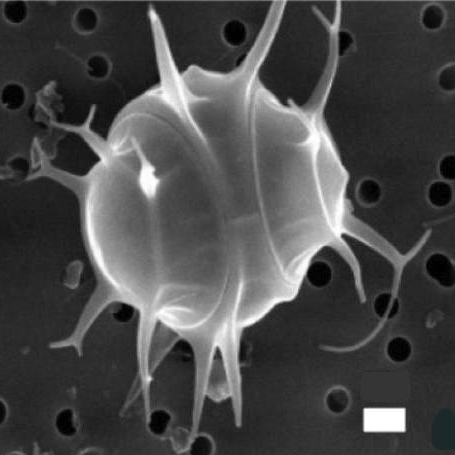
- Pentalamina corona, scale bar = 1 μm

Scientific classification
- Domain: Eukaryota
- Clade: Sar
- Clade: Stramenopiles
- Division: Ochrophyta
- Class: Bolidophyceae
- Order: Parmales; B.C.Booth & H.J.Marchant

Families
- Pentalaminaceae; Triparmaceae

= Parmales =

Order of algae

The Parmales are an order of marine microalgae within the Bolidophyceae class. They are found worldwide and characterized by a cell wall composed of 5-8 interlocking silica plates with distinct forms. They were initially thought to be loricate choanoflagellates but were shown to be a separate phyla entirely upon the discovery of chloroplasts, placing it among the photosynthetic stramenopiles.

The group is divided into two distinct morphologies- the naked and mobile bolidophyte form and the non-mobile and silica-plate covered parmalean form. The bolidophyte form lacks silica plates and has two unequal flagella inserted ventrally, vaguely reminiscent of Chlamydomonas. The parmalean form is similar to the diatoms as it is coated in silicate plates. These silicate plates are used to divide the Parmales into separate genera based upon the number and location of the siliceous plates. Unlike the diatoms, the Parmales are able to grow in silica-limiting environments because the synthesis of the silica plates is not directly connected to growth or reproduction.

The Parmales actively feed on nanophytoplankton such as Prochlorococcus and Synechococcus and are one of the most important grazers on these cyanobacteria in oligotrophic waters. This heterotrophy serves as an important step in the foundation of the microbial loop.

== Etymology ==
The name comes from the Latin word for a small, round shield carried by infantry and cavalry. It refers to the silica plates that the Parmales are covered by.

== Distribution ==
Parmales can be found in all the major world oceans. However, their density is consistently low (10-100 cells/ml) and they represent at most 3% of the phytoplankton present. They are most abundant in polar and subarctic waters but are also capable of growing in tropical and subtropical locations.

Within the water column, Parmales are found in the upper, euphotic portion where they remain without difficulty due to their small size. It is currently unknown whether they have mechanisms to regulate buoyancy.

Parmales have also been found as fossils in the Middle America Trench in sediments from the mid to late Quaternary period. Older fossils have been reported but are unverifiable.

== Taxonomy ==
Although initially placed within the Chrysophyceae, Parmales were shown in 2016 to belong to their own class, Bolidophyceae.

- Class Bolidophyceae Guillou & Chretiennot-Dinet 1999
  - Order Parmales Booth & Marchant 1987
    - Family Pentalaminaceae Marchant 1987
      - Genus Pentalamina Marchant 1987
        - Species Pentalamina corona Marchant 1987
    - Family Triparmaceae Booth & Marchant 1988
      - Genus Tetraparma Booth 1987
        - Species T. catinifera
        - Species T. gracilis
        - Species T. insecta Bravo-Sierra & Hernández-Becerril 2003
        - Species T. pelagica Booth & Marchant 1987
        - Species T. silverae Fujita & Jordan 2017
        - Species T. trullifera Fujita & Jordan 2017
      - Genus Triparma Booth & Marchant 1987
        - Species T. columacea Booth 1987
        - Species T. eleuthera Ichinomiya & Lopes dos Santos 2016
        - Species T. laevis Booth 1987
        - Species T. mediterranea (Guillou & Chrétiennot-Dinet) Ichinomiya & Lopes dos Santos 2016
        - Species T. pacifica (Guillou & Chrétiennot-Dinet) Ichinomiya & Lopes dos Santos 2016
        - Species T. retinervis Booth 1987
        - Species T. strigata Booth 1987
        - Species T. verrucosa Booth 1987
