= Picochlorum eukaryotum =

Scientific classification
- Kingdom: Plantae
- Division: Chlorophyta
- Class: Trebouxiophyceae
- Order: Chlorellales
- Family: incertae sedis
- Genus: Picochlorum
- Species: P. eukaryotum

Binomial name
- Picochlorum eukaryotum W.J.Henley, J.L.Hironaka, L.Guillou, M.A.Buchheim, J.A.Buchheim, M.W.Fawley & K.P.Fawley

Synonyms
- Nanochlorum eukaryotum

Species of coccoidal green algae

Picochlorum eukaryotum, also called Nanochlorum eukaryotum, is a species of marine coccoidal green algae.

This alga is approximately 1.5 microns in size. Initial research showed it to be related to Chlorella vulgaris.
