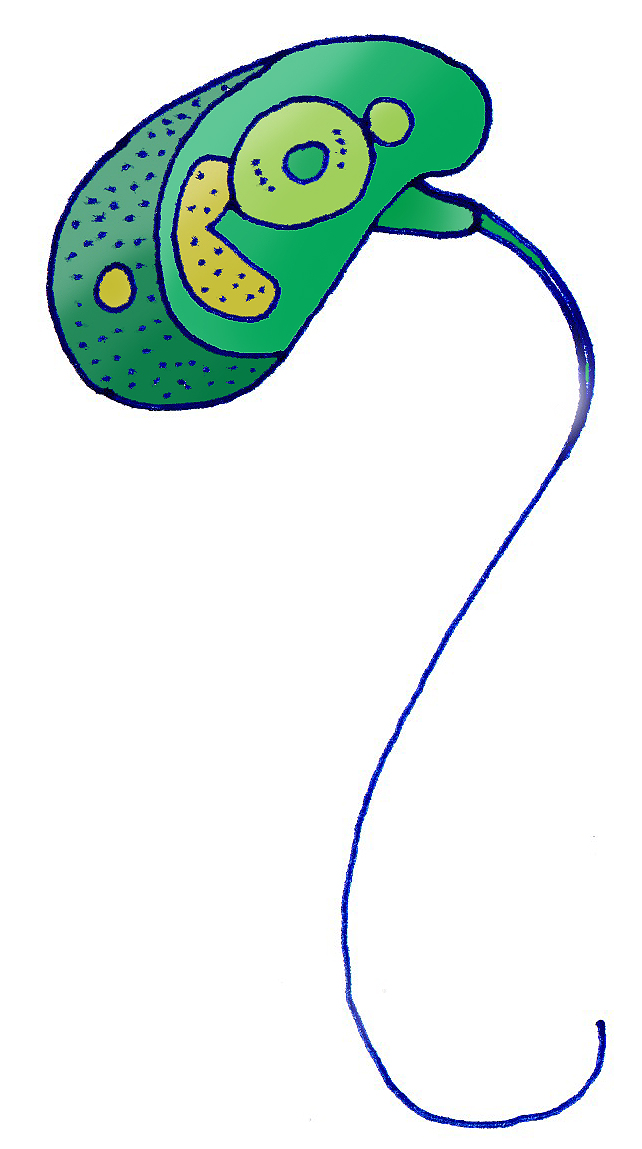
- Micromonas pusilla

Scientific classification
- Kingdom: Plantae
- Division: Chlorophyta
- Class: Mamiellophyceae
- Order: Mamiellales
- Family: Mamiellaceae; Moestrup 1984

Genera
- Mamiella; Mantoniella; Micromonas

Synonyms
- Micromonadaceae Sym & Pienaar 1993

= Mamiellaceae =

Family of algae

Mamiellaceae is a family of green algae in the order Mamiellales.
