= Mamiella =

Scientific classification
- Kingdom: Plantae
- Division: Chlorophyta
- Class: Mamiellophyceae
- Order: Mamiellales
- Family: Mamiellaceae
- Genus: Mamiella; Moestrup 1984

Species
- Mamiella gilva (Parke & Rayns 1964) Moestrup 1984

Synonyms
- Nephroselmis gilva Parke & Rayns 1964

Genus of algae

Mamiella is a genus of green algae in the family Mamiellaceae.
