= Heterotrophic picoplankton =

Non-photosynthesising plankton

Heterotrophic picoplankton is the fraction of plankton composed by cells between 0.2 and 2 μm that do not perform photosynthesis. They form an important component of many biogeochemical cycles.

Cells can be either:

- prokaryotes

Archaea form a major part of the picoplankton in the Antarctic and are abundant in other regions of the ocean. Archaea have also been found in freshwater picoplankton, but do not appear to be so abundant in these environments.

- eukaryotes

== Cell structure ==
=== Nucleic acid content in cells ===
Heterotrophic picoplankton can be divided into two broad categories: high nucleic acid (HNA) content cells and low nucleic acid (LNA) content cells. Nucleic acids are large biomolecules that store and express genomic information. HNA picoplankton dominate in waters that are eutrophic to mesotrophic while low LNA picoplankton dominate in stratified oligotrophic environments. The proportion of HNA picoplankton to LNA picoplankton is a defining characteristic of bacterioplankton communities. Addition of glyphosate, a common herbicide that causes increased levels of phosphorus when introduced to aquatic systems, causes an increase in the ratio of HNA to LNA bacteria. Nucleic acids are a costly compound for cells to synthesize and the increased bioavailable phosphorus in the system likely allows HNA bacteria to rapidly synthesize more nucleic acids and divide. HNA bacterioplankton are larger and more active than LNA picoplankton. HNA cells also have higher specific metabolic and growth rates, likely allowing these types of bacterioplankton to better utilize and exploit sudden increases in nutrients within the water column. The relative abundance of HNA to LNA cells is related to overall system productivity, specifically chlorophyll concentration, though other factors likely also contribute to bacterioplankton distribution.

== Biogeochemical cycling ==
=== Dissolved organic matter ===
Heterotrophic picoplankton play a critical role in nutrient and carbon recycling in ecological food webs by transforming and mineralizing organic matter. Aquatic dissolved organic matter is one of the largest organic pools on Earth and a major part of the carbon cycle. The majority of dissolved organic matter is either resistant to transformation or semi-labile, limiting the availability of these compounds to biodegradation. Water bodies accumulate dissolved organic matter via both allochthonous sources, mainly decaying terrestrial plants and soil organic matter, and autochthonous sources, mainly from phytoplankton and macrophytes. As major decomposers of organic matter, heterotrophic bacterioplankton act as an important link between detritus, dissolved organic matter, and higher trophic levels in aquatic systems. Bacterioplankton degrade particulate organic matter into smaller compounds and either assimilate and absorb them or expel them as inorganic carbon. Both of these processes promote transformation of matter within the aquatic system and promote energy flow and are important components of the overall quality of a water body. Heterotrophic bacteria community structure and functionality is used to assess the trophic status and quality of freshwater systems.
