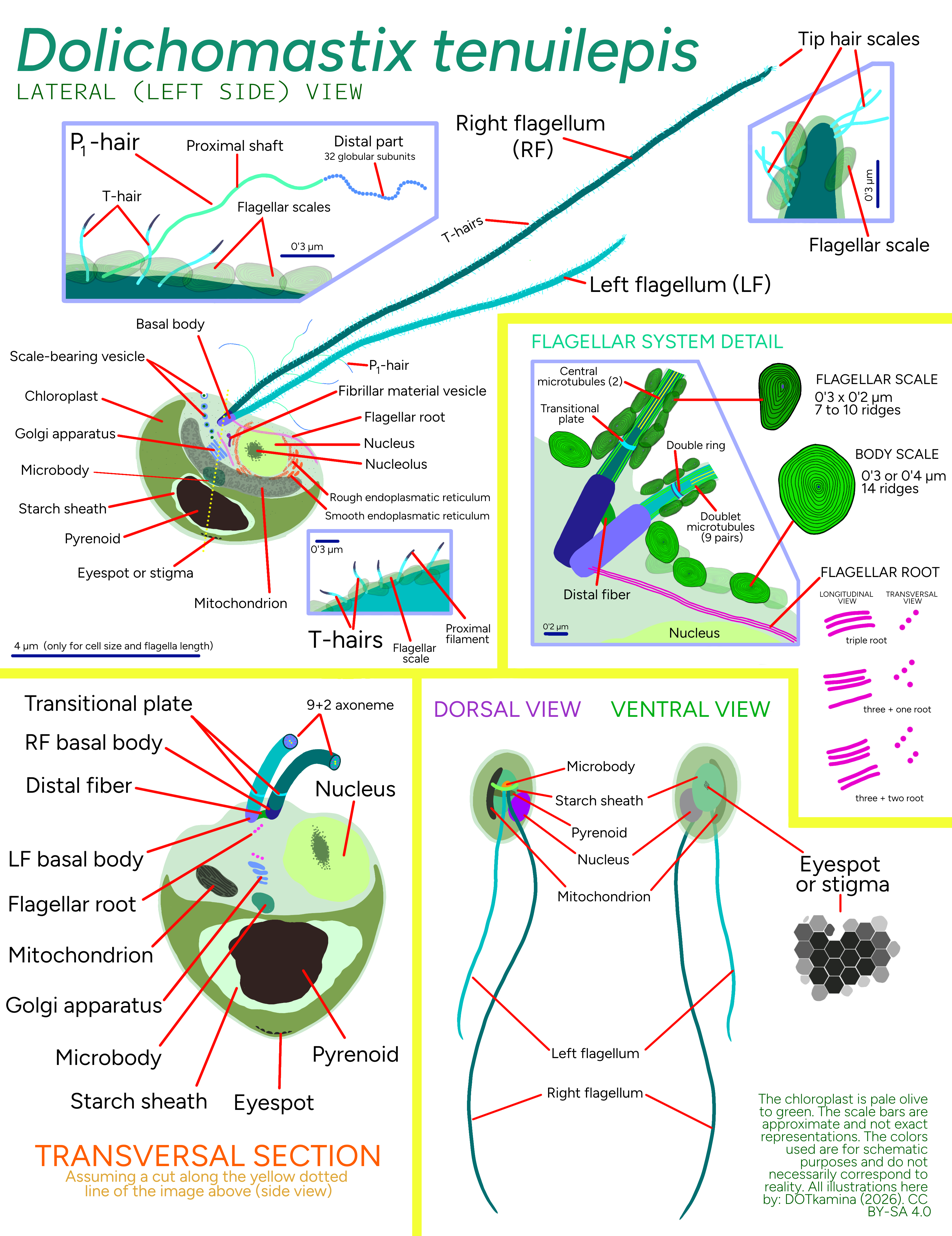

Scientific classification
- Kingdom: Plantae
- Division: Chlorophyta
- Class: Mamiellophyceae
- Order: Dolichomastigales
- Genus: Dolichomastix
- Species: D. tenuilepis

Binomial name
- Dolichomastix tenuilepis Throndsen & Zingone 1997

= Dolichomastix tenuilepis =

Species of green algae

Dolichomastix tenuilepis is a unicellular alga of the order Dolichomastigales, family Dolichomastigaceae. The species inhabits marine environments. Specimens were collected in Niskin bottles at a station on the island of Capri on July 6, 1994. The species is distinguished from other Dolichomastix species primarily by its scales, which are not radiated.

== Description. ==
The cells are rounded-triangular and measure 3 to 4.5 µm in length. They are slightly compressed laterally and have a flattened area at the top from which the flagella protrude. The flagella follow the eukaryotic 9+2 microtubule arrangement (9 doublets surrounding 2 central microtubules). The flagella are unequal in length, the right one being longer than the left (12 to 18 µm versus 7.5 to 16 µm, respectively).

The chloroplast is pale olive to green in color and cup-shaped. It contains a pyrenoid covered by a starch sheath, which is not covered dorsally. In this same area, one or more pyrenoid peduncles may be present. On the opposite side of the pyrenoid, just below the chloroplast membrane, is the eyespot or stigma, which is composed of hexagonal droplets.

The organism has only one sausage-shaped mitochondrion. The nucleus is surrounded by endoplasmic reticulum. Between the nucleus and the chloroplast region where the pyrenoid is located, there is a microbody. The Golgi apparatus is located near the basal bodies, and it is where the body and flagellar scales are produced, which are then transported via vesicles.

The cell body is covered with nearly circular scales, typically 0.4 µm in diameter with 14 concentric rings, although smaller variants of 0.3 µm in diameter and with fewer than 14 rings (as few as 9) also exist. The flagella have their own irregularly elliptical scales, 0.3 x 0.2 µm in diameter, with 7 to 10 concentric rings.

In addition, flagella have hair scales, and there are three types: T-hairs, which are tubular, 0.4 µm long, arranged in two rows along each flagellum, and with a darkened end containing electron-dense material; tip hairs, found only at the ends of the flagella, 0.3 µm long; and P1 hairs, 1.7 µm long, with 32 distal globular subunits. P1 hairs are few and are only found in the proximal region of the longer flagellum (the right one), that is, in the area closest to the exit from the cell body.
