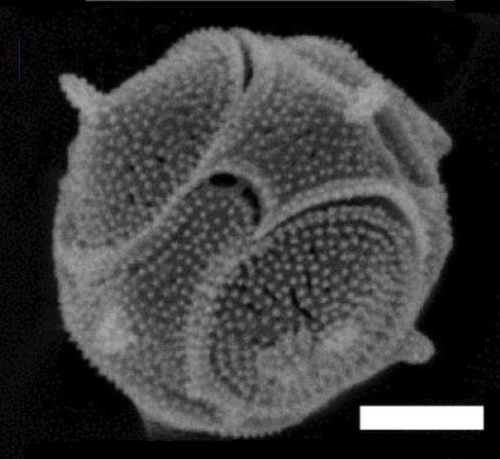
- Tetraparma pelagica, scale bar = 1 μm

Scientific classification
- Domain: Eukaryota
- Clade: Sar
- Clade: Stramenopiles
- Division: Ochrophyta
- Class: Bolidophyceae
- Order: Parmales
- Family: Triparmaceae
- Genus: Tetraparma; B.C.Booth

Species
- Tetraparma catinifera; Tetraparma gracilis; Tetraparma insecta; Tetraparma pelagica; Tetraparma silverae; Tetraparma trullifera

= Tetraparma =

Genus of single-celled organisms

Tetraparma is a genus of unicellular algae in the family Triparmaceae in the order Parmales. They form siliceous plates on the cell surface that aid in identification. Tetraparma is distinguished by its possession of three shield plates that may have everted rims, three triradiate girdle plates, a triradiate dorsal plate with notched ends, and a large ventral plate. It was first described by Booth & Marchant in 1987 and the holotype is Triparma columacea.

Tetraparma cells have two forms: the motile, naked form and the non-motile siliceous form. The motile cells propelled by two flagella of unequal length, typical of heterokonts. The non-motile forms do not possess flagella but instead have a silicified cell wall with a distinctive plate morphology: three shield plates, three triradiate girdle plates, a triradiate dorsal plate with notched ends, and a small ventral plate. Both forms contain a single, dorsal chloroplast that contains chlorophylls a and c_{1-3} as well as fucoxanthin. They are typically 2-5 μm in size and generally spherical or heart-shaped.

== Taxonomy ==
- Class Bolidophyceae Guillou & Chretiennot-Dinet 1999
  - Order Parmales Booth & Marchant 1987
    - Family Triparmaceae Booth & Marchant 1988
      - Genus Tetraparma Booth & Marchant 1987
        - Species T. catinifera Booth 1987
        - Species T. gracilis Ichinomiya & Lopes dos Santos 2016
        - Species T. insecta Booth 1987
        - Species T. pelagica (Guillou & Chrétiennot-Dinet) Ichinomiya & Lopes dos Santos 2016
        - Species T. silverae (Guillou & Chrétiennot-Dinet) Ichinomiya & Lopes dos Santos 2016
        - Species T. trullifera Booth 1987
