= Picocyanobacteria =

Fraction of cyanobacteria between 0.2 and 2 μm

Picocyanobacteria are cyanobacteria that are part of the picoplankton, which is the fraction of plankton composed by cells between 0.2 and 2 μm. Picocyanobacteria comprise the smallest photoautotrophs.

== Genera ==
Freshwater picocyanobacteria genera include Synechococcus, Cyanobium, and Synechocystis, and marine picocyanobacteria genera are represented primarily by Synechococcus and Prochlorococcus.

== See also ==
- Cyanobacteria
- Picoplankton
- Picoeukaryote
- Picozoa
- Plankton § Size groups
