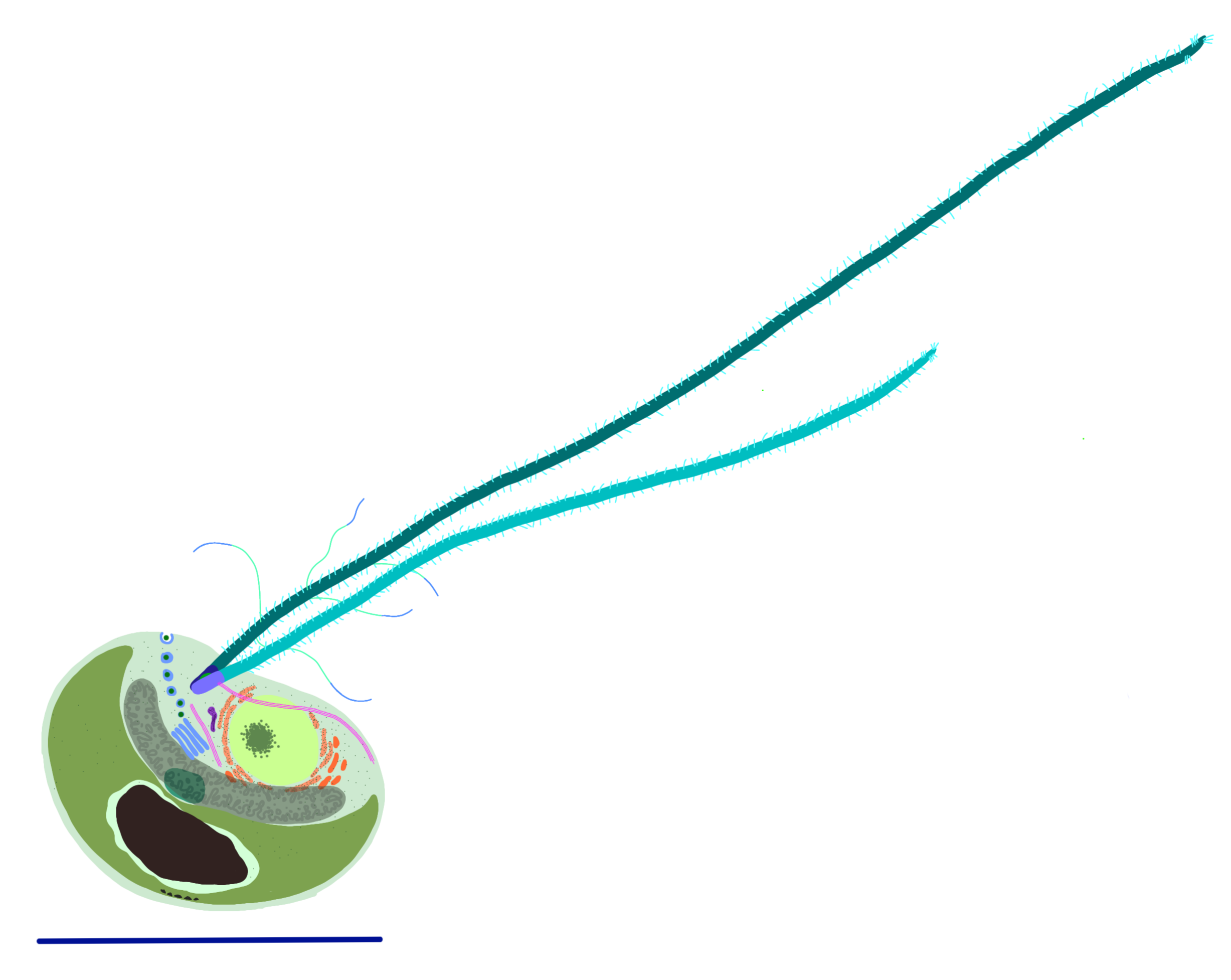
- Dolichomastix tenuilepis

Scientific classification
- Kingdom: Plantae
- Division: Chlorophyta
- Class: Mamiellophyceae
- Order: Dolichomastigales
- Family: Dolichomastigaceae
- Genus: Dolichomastix; Manton 1977

Species
- D. eurylepidea Manton 1977; D. lepidota Manton 1977; D. nummulifera Manton 1977; D. tenuilepis Throndsen & Zingone 1997

= Dolichomastix (alga) =

Genus of algae

Dolichomastix is a genus of green algae in the class Mamiellophyceae. It is a biflagellate unicellular alga. The cell body is covered with non-mineralized scales.

== Taxonomy. ==
Dolichomastix is included in the order Dolichomastigales, this in the class Mamiellophyceae, infrakingdom Chlorophyta, which is included in the subkingdom Viridiplantae (plants and algae related to plants, with chlorophytes being an infrakingdom related to streptophytes, the group in which plants as such are included).
