= Dolichomastigales =

Scientific classification
- Clade: Viridiplantae
- Division: Chlorophyta
- Class: Mamiellophyceae
- Order: Dolichomastigales; Marin & Melkonian

Families
- Crustomastigaceae B.Marin & Melkonian; Dolichomastigaceae B.Marin & Melkonian

Order of algae

Dolichomastigales are an order of green algae in the class Mamiellophyceae.

== Taxonomy ==
The order Dolichomastigales consists of two families with seven species.

- Family Crustomastigaceae B.Marin & Melkonian (2 species)
  - Genus Crustomastix T.Nakayama, Kawachi & I.Inouye
    - Crustomastix didyma T.Nakayama, M.Kawachi & I.Inouye
    - Crustomastix stigmatica Zingone
- Family Dolichomastigaceae B.Marin & Melkonian (5 species)
  - Genus Dolichomastix Manton
    - Dolichomastix eurylepidea Manton
    - Dolichomastix lepidota Manton
    - Dolichomastix nummulifera Manton
    - Dolichomastix tenuilepis Throndsen & Zingone
  - Genus Microrhizoidea Wetherbee
    - Microrhizoidea pickettheapsiorum Wetherbee
