= Picochlorum oklahomense =

Scientific classification
- Clade: Viridiplantae
- Division: Chlorophyta
- Class: Trebouxiophyceae
- Order: Chlorellales
- Family: incertae sedis
- Genus: Picochlorum
- Species: P. oklahomense

Binomial name
- Picochlorum oklahomense Hironaka in Henley et al. 2004

Species of alga

Picochlorum oklahomense is a species of coccoid chlorophyte algae, the type species of its genus. It is broadly halotolerant, small, asexual and lacks chlorophyll b. The author of the name spelt the specific epithet "oklahomensis". AlgaeBase corrects this to the neuter form oklahomense, to agree with the genus name.
