= Picochlorum =

Scientific classification
- Clade: Viridiplantae
- Division: Chlorophyta
- Class: Trebouxiophyceae
- Order: Chlorellales
- Family: incertae sedis
- Genus: Picochlorum; W.J.Henley et al., nom. illegit.

Species
- Picochlorum atomus (Butcher) Henley, Hironaka, Guillou, M.Buchheim, J.Buchheim, M.Fawley & K.Fawley; Picochlorum maculatum (Butcher) Henley, Hironaka, Guillou, M.Buchheim, J.Buchheim, M.Fawley & K.Fawley; Picochlorum oklahomense Hironaka; Picochlorum celeri

Genus of green algae

Picochlorum is a genus of green algae in the class Trebouxiophyceae. As of February 2022, AlgaeBase regarded the name as illegitimate.

It is a native marine microalga fit for cultivation at high growth rates, showing a 2-hour multiplying time in ideal conditions.
