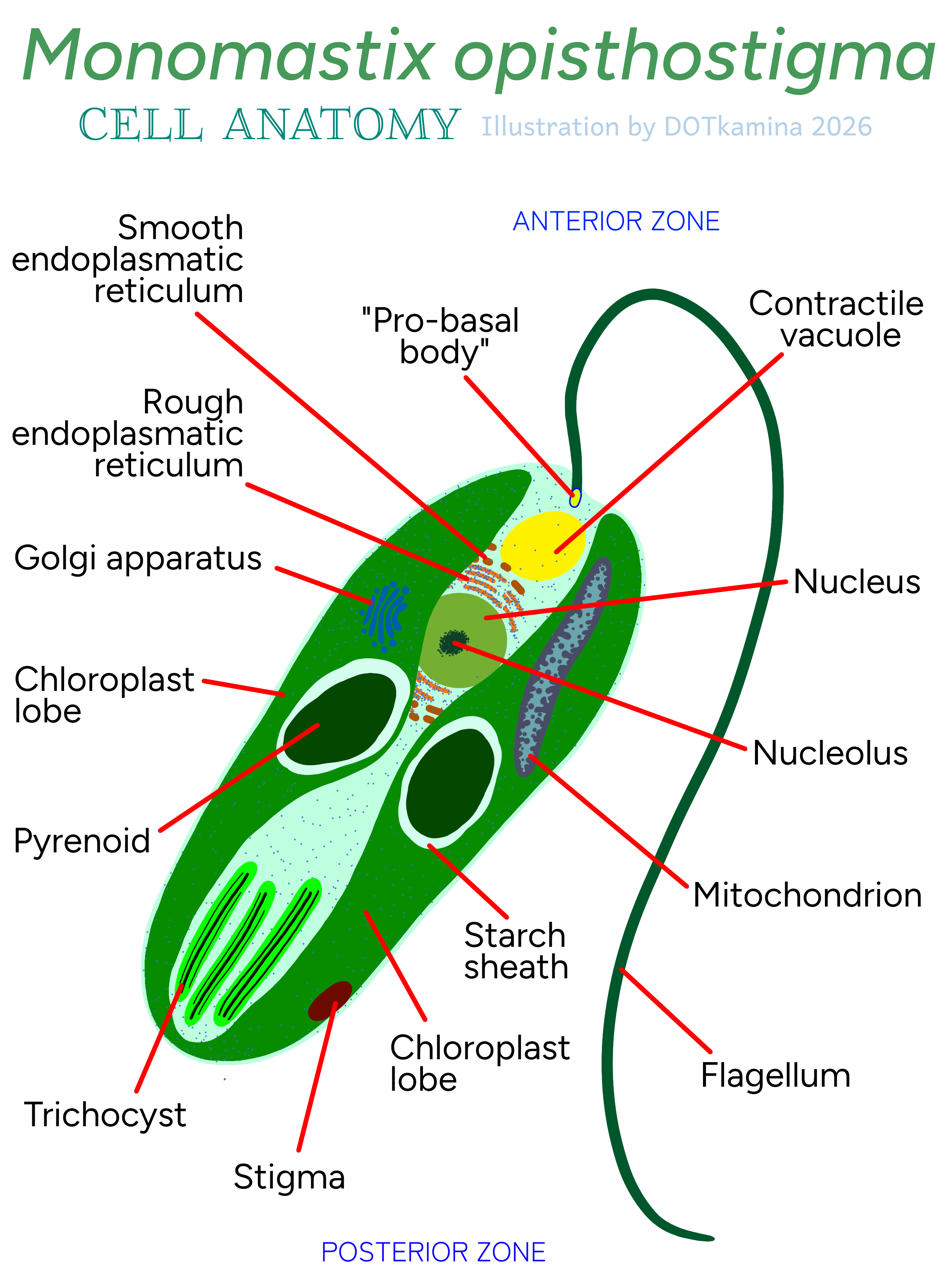

Scientific classification
- Kingdom: Plantae
- Division: Chlorophyta
- Class: Mamiellophyceae
- Order: Monomastigales; Norris ex Melkonian & Marin 2010
- Family: Monomastigaceae; Huber-Pestalozzi ex Marin & Melkonian 2010
- Genus: Monomastix; Scherffel 1912

Type species
- Monomastix opisthostigma Scherffel 1912

Species
- Monomastix astigmata Skuja 1956; Monomastix minuta Skuja 1956; Monomastix opisthostigma Scherffel 1912; Monomastix pernana; Monomastix pyrenigera Skuja

= Monomastix =

Genus of algae

Monomastix is a genus of green algae in the class Mamiellophyceae. It is the only genus in the family Monomastigaceae, which in turn is the only family in the order Monomastigales.
