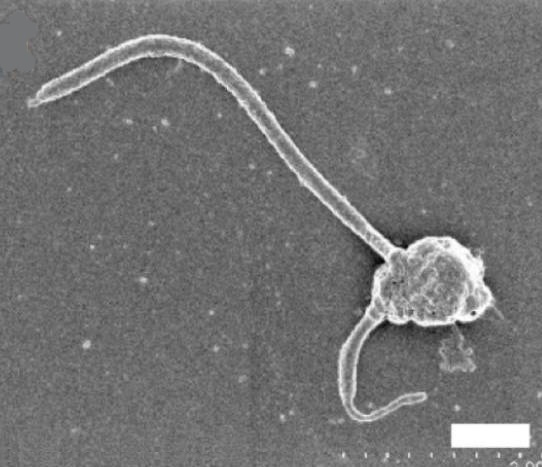
- The flagellated Triparma eleuthera

Scientific classification
- Domain: Eukaryota
- Clade: Sar
- Clade: Stramenopiles
- Division: Ochrophyta
- Class: Bolidophyceae
- Order: Parmales
- Family: Triparmaceae
- Genus: Triparma; Booth and Marchant

Species
- Triparma columacea; Triparma eleuthera; Triparma laevis; Triparma mediterranea; Triparma pacifica; Triparma retinervis; Triparma strigata; Triparma verrucosa

Synonyms
- Bolidomonas

= Triparma =

Genus of single-celled organisms

Triparma is a genus of unicellular algae in the family Triparmaceae in the order Parmales. They form siliceous plates on the cell surface that aid in identification. Triparma is distinguished by its possession of three shield plates, three triradiate girdle plates, a triradiate girdle plate with notched ends, and a small ventral plate. It was first described by Booth & Marchant in 1987 and the holotype is Triparma columacea.

Triparma laevis silicate shell

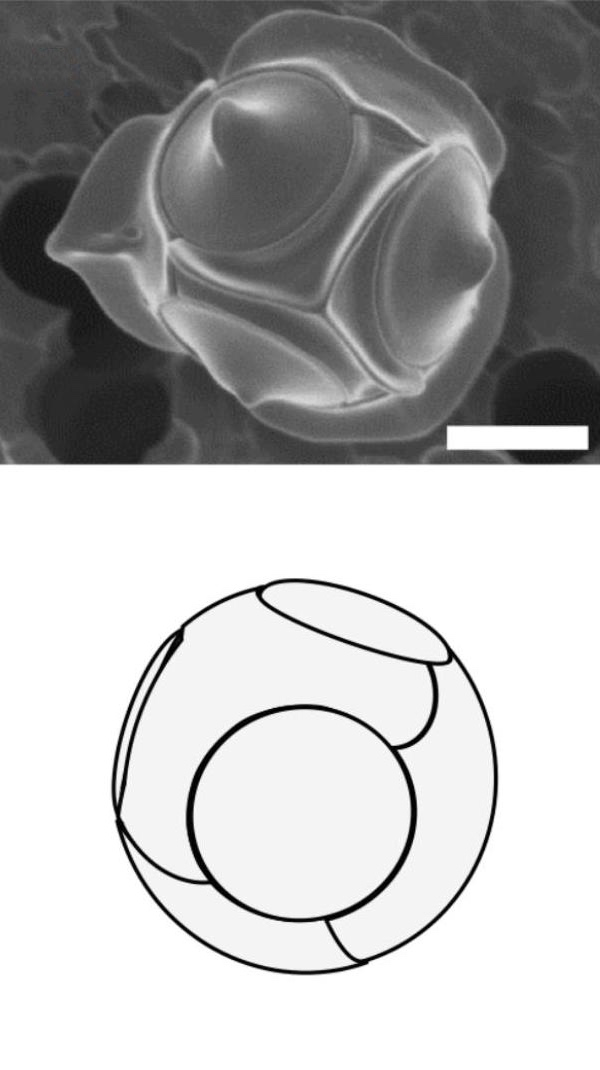
The silicated Triparma laevis (top) and a drawing of its shell, scale bar = 1 μm.

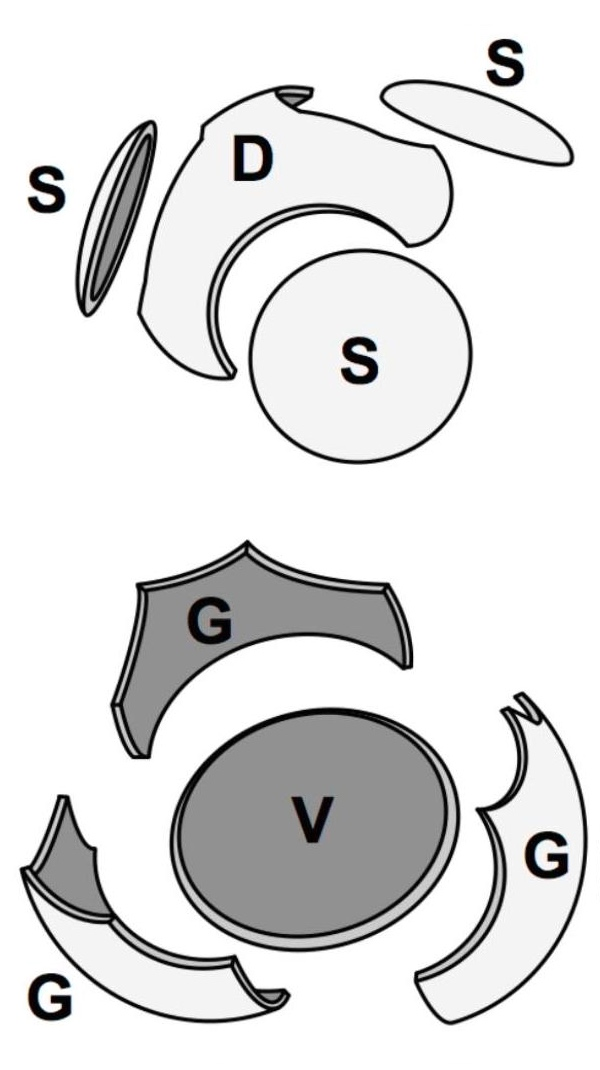
Exploded shell: D = dorsal plate, G = girdle plate, S = shield plate and V = ventral plate.

Triparma cells have two forms: the motile, naked form and the non-motile siliceous form. The motile cells propelled by two flagella of unequal length, typical of heterokonts. The non-motile forms do not possess flagella but instead have a silicified cell wall with a distinctive plate morphology: three shield plates, three oblong girdle plates, a triradiate dorsal plate with rounded ends, and a large ventral plate. Both forms contain a single, dorsal chloroplast that contains chlorophylls a and c_{1-3} as well as fucoxanthin. They are typically 1-2 μm in size and generally spherical or heart-shaped.

The genus Triparma is actively studied because of their close relationship to the diatoms, and it has been discovered that they have different silica-limitation responses. While diatoms stop growing and cell division is inhibited under low-silica conditions, Triparma continues to grow and divide normally even under nanomolar concentrations of silica, although the silica plates are no longer produced.

Photosynthetic pigments present in bolydophyte chloroplasts include chlorophylls a, c_{1}, c_{2}, c_{3}, fucoxanthin, diatoxanthin, diadinoxanthin.

== Synonyms ==
The genus now includes all species from the non-monophyletic genus Bolidomonas, according to Ichinomiya et al (2016).

== Taxonomy ==
- Class Bolidophyceae Guillou & Chretiennot-Dinet 1999
  - Order Parmales Booth & Marchant 1987
    - Family Triparmaceae Booth & Marchant 1988
      - Genus Triparma Booth & Marchant 1987
        - Species T. columacea Booth 1987
        - Species T. eleuthera Ichinomiya & Lopes dos Santos 2016
        - Species T. laevis Booth 1987
        - Species T. mediterranea (Guillou & Chrétiennot-Dinet) Ichinomiya & Lopes dos Santos 2016
        - Species T. pacifica (Guillou & Chrétiennot-Dinet) Ichinomiya & Lopes dos Santos 2016
        - Species T. retinervis Booth 1987
        - Species T. strigata Booth 1987
        - Species T. verrucosa Booth 1987
