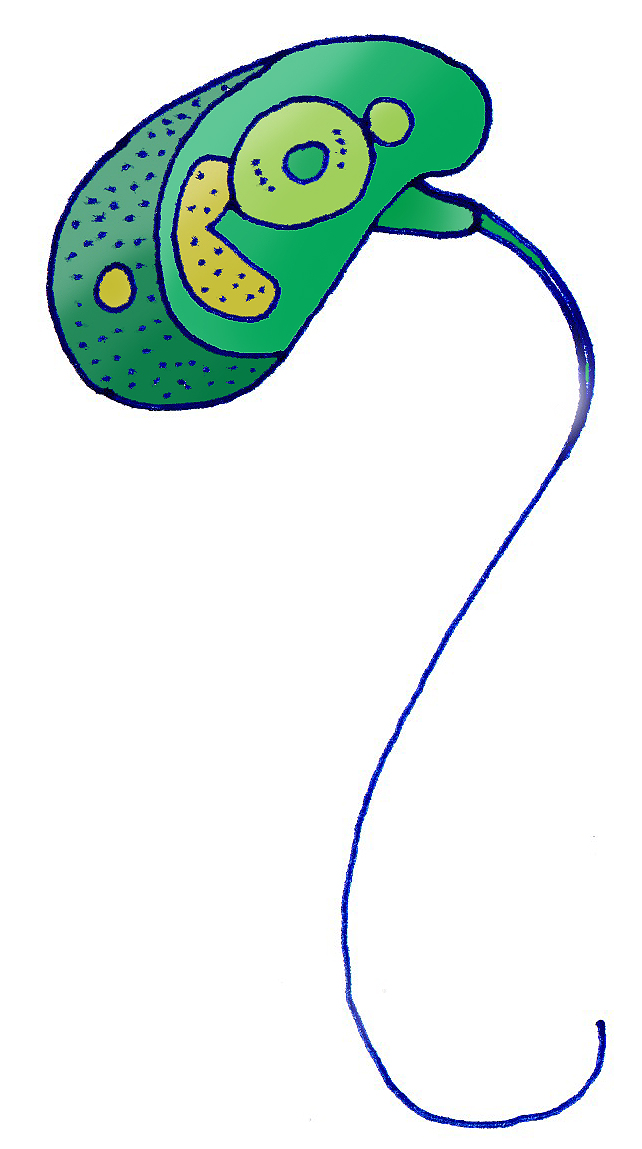
- Micromonas pusilla

Scientific classification
- Domain: Eukaryota
- Supergroup: Archaeplastida
- Clade: Viridiplantae
- Division: Chlorophyta
- Class: Mamiellophyceae
- Order: Mamiellales
- Family: Mamiellaceae
- Genus: Micromonas; Manton & Parke 1960

Species
- Micromonas commoda Baren, Bachy & Worden 2016; Micromonas bravo Simon, Foulon & Marin 2017; Micromonas polaris Simon, Foulon & Marin 2017; Micromonas pusilla (Butcher 1952) Manton & Parke 1960

= Micromonas =

Genus of algae

Micromonas is a genus of green algae in the family Mamiellaceae.

Micromonas is a widespread prasinophyte alga that is very small in size, motile, and phototactic. Before characterization and naming of a second species, Micromonas commoda through genome analysis, Micromonas pusilla was considered to be the only species in the genus. This led to a disproportionate amount of research discussing a single species and the suggestion that it was the dominant photosynthetic picoeukaryote in some marine ecosystems. Unlike many marine algae, this single species was thought to be distributed widely in both warm and cold waters, but genome sequencing confirmed indications from single-gene studies that its global distribution really reflected presence of multiple species occupying different niches in the ocean.

Some studies have divided Micromonas pusilla into 3 to 5 different clades despite their similarity in morphologies and habitats. Varying ratios of clades contribute to the M. pusilla population throughout the marine ecosystem leading to the hypothesis of clades arising based on niche occupation and susceptibility to virus infection. Other studies have established the presence of at least seven phylogenetically distinct species for which global sequence analyses are beginning to delineate clear differences in the ocean regions they inhabit, with only some of the species actually co-occurring in the same environment.

== Discovery ==
Micromonas pusilla is considered the first picoplankton studied, when it was discovered and named Chromulina pusilla in the 1950s by R. Butcher. Later, electron micrographs by the English scientists, Irene Manton and Mary Park, in the 1960s provided further details on M. pusilla.

== Cell morphology and structure ==
Micromonas is a group of small unicellular pear-shaped micro-algae that do not have a visible cell wall. Just like other members in the class, they have a single mitochondrion and a single chloroplast, which covers almost half of the cell. They are able to swim due to the presence of a scale-less flagellum. The axonemal structure of the flagellum for this genus is different in that the peripheral microtubules do not extend up to the termination of the central pair of microtubules, allowing a visible investigation of the motion of the central pair. In Micromonas, the central pair constantly rotates in an anti-clockwise direction, despite the motion of other components of the flagellum.

While the cell size, shape and the location of insertion of the flagellum into the cell are similar among strains and genetic clades, the variation in respective hair point length results in different lengths of the flagella within the genus.

== Antibiotic ==
The antibiotic susceptibility was determined using a single strain of M. pusilla with the purpose to produce axenic cultures to be used in studies and experiments. The strain of M.pusilla was tested with a range of antibiotics to determine the possible effects of the particular antibiotic.

Resistance: benzylpenicillin, gentamicin, kanamycin, neomycin, streptomycin

Sensitive: chloramphenicol, polymyxin B

For M. pusilla, sensitivity towards an antibiotic is likely defined by the impairment of growth, rather than a lethal effect, when subjected to bactericidal levels of that particular antibiotic. The susceptibility of other strains of M. pusilla towards this set of antibiotics should be the same.

== Genetics ==
=== Evolutionary history ===
Micromonas diverged early on from the lineage that led to all modern terrestrial plants. Individual species have very similar 18S ribosomal RNA gene sequences, a comparison often used to determine microscopic speciation; however, <90% of different genes are shared between the two genome sequenced Micromonas species. They have more notable differences in the V1-V2 region of the 16S ribosomal RNA genes (located in the chloroplast genome). More recent analyses show just how divergent they are in relation to other green lineage members, specifically land plants and chlorophyte green algae.

Although Micromonas pusilla was thought to represent a single species, genetic studies have shown that Micromonas lineages diverged from each other as early as 65 million years ago, accumulating a large amount of genetic differences. The lack of morphological differentiation means that Micromonas pusilla may be considered a cryptic species complex.

=== Strain isolation ===
The original Micromonas reference genome(s) were created from strain CCMP1545 isolated from the North Atlantic and deposited in a culture collection in the 1980s, and strain CCMP2709 (RCC299 prior to being rendered axenic and clonal), isolated in 1998 from an Equatorial Pacific sample. These strains had been cultured for decades and are available from the National Center for Marine Algae and Microbiota (NCMA, US) and the Roscoff Culture Collection (RCC, FR).

== Cellular mechanisms ==
=== Cell growth and division ===
Micromonas reproduces asexually through fission. It has been observed that M. pusilla shows variability in optical characteristics, for example cell size and light scattering, throughout the day. There is an increase in these measurements during the period with light, followed by a decrease during period without light. This coincides with the findings that proteomic profiles change over the diel cycle, with an increase in expression of proteins related to cell proliferation, lipid and cell membrane restructuring in the dark when cells start dividing and become smaller. However, the expression levels of genes and proteins can still vary within the same metabolic pathway. It has also been suggested that the structure of 3' UTR may play a role in the regulatory system.

=== Light-harvesting system ===
Micromonas species still share the same collection of photosynthetic pigments as the members of the class Mamiellophyceae, which includes the common pigments chlorophyll a and chlorophyll b, as well as prasinoxanthin (xanthophyll K), the first algal carotenoid being assigned with a structure that has a γ-end group. It has been discovered that most of its xanthophylls are in the oxidized state and show similarities to ones possessed by other important marine planktons like diatoms, golden and brown algae, and dinoflagellates. In addition, there is another pigment called Chl cCS-170 can be found in some strains of Micromonas and Ostreococcus living in deeper part of the ocean, which may indicate a potential adaptation for organisms that reside under low light intensity; however, at least for Ostreococcus, these strains are found throughout the water column in open ocean gyres, including in surface waters.

The light-harvesting complexes of Micromonas are distinguishable from other green algae in terms of pigment composition and stability under unfavorable conditions. It has been shown that these proteins use three different pigments for light harvesting, and they are resistant to high temperature and the presence of detergent.

=== Peptidoglycan biosynthesis ===
Even though the chloroplasts, which are suggested to be originated from Cyanobacteria via endosymbiosis, from Micromonas do not have a surrounding peptidoglycan layer, the peptidoglycan biosynthesis pathway is found to be complete in M. pusilla and partial in M. commoda, with the presence of some relevant enzymes only. While the role of this pathway for Micromonas is still under investigation, this observation shows a lineage for different species of Micromonas along with glaucophyte algae which still have their chloroplasts covered with peptidoglycan.

== Ecological significance ==
Micromonas make up a significant amount of picoplanktonic biomass and productivity in both oceanic and coastal regions. The abundance of Micromonas has increased over the past decade. Evidence shows these spikes in numbers are induced through climate change, which has been felt more drastically in the Arctic. Many green algal species have been considered solely photosynthetic, and this appears to be the case for Micromonas. Some years ago a study indicated that Micromonas had a predatory mixotrophic lifestyle that might have large impacts on prokaryotic populations within the Arctic. Due to the large consumption of prokaryotes by Micromonas, this study and others building on it, suggested it might underlie why photosynthetic picoeukaryotes appear to be increasing in the arctic. However, the authors of that study lost the strain used, and two subsequent studies by other laboratories were unable to replicate the results, concluding that Micromonas, including M. polaris, is not a predatory mixotroph.

== Viral infection ==
Viruses are important in the balance of marine ecosystem by regulating the composition of microbial communities, but their behaviors can be affected by several factors including temperature, mode of infection and host conditions. There is an increasing number of Micromonas-infecting virus being discovered and studied, including studies of transcriptional responses to infection under differing nutrient conditions.

=== Micromonas pusilla virus ===
There are currently 45 viral strains identified that coexist with M. pusilla populations. Virus infectivity is dependent on the host strain, light availability and virus adsorption.

Per day average of death due to virus lysis is estimated to be about 2 to 10% of the M. pusilla population.

- Micromonas pusilla reovirus (MpRV): The first isolation of a reovirus that infects protist. This virus is found to be bigger than other members of the family.

=== Micromonas polaris virus ===
It is the first phycodnavirus being isolated from polar ocean waters. It can infect M. polaris, which is the polar ecotype of Micromonas that has adapted to waters with low temperatures.

Evidence suggests that the increase in temperature due to climate change may shift the clonal composition of both the virus and host.

== Metabolic engineering ==
With the growing population in the world, there is an increased demand for wild fishes and algae for their source of polyunsaturated fatty acids (PUFA), which is required for growth and development, as well as the maintenance of health in humans. Recent research is investigating an alternative mechanism for production of PUFA by using acyl-CoA Δ6-desaturase, an enzyme present in M. pusilla, with plants. The M. pusilla strain of acyl-CoA Δ6-desaturase is highly effective in the polyunsaturated fatty acid synthesis pathway due to its strong binding preference for omega-3 substrates in land plants.
