= Ostreococcus =

Scientific classification
- Kingdom: Plantae
- Division: Chlorophyta
- Class: Mamiellophyceae
- Order: Mamiellales
- Family: Bathycoccaceae
- Genus: Ostreococcus; C. Courties & M.-J. Chrétiennot-Dinet (1995)

Species
- Ostreococcus tauri; Ostreococcus mediterraneus; Ostreococcus lucimarinus

Genus of algae

Ostreococcus is a genus of unicellular coccoid or spherically shaped green algae belonging to the class Mamiellophyceae. It includes prominent members of the global picoplankton community, which plays a central role in the oceanic carbon cycle.

== History ==
The first member of the genus, O. tauri, was discovered in 1994 in an investigation of the picoplankton in the Thau lagoon by Courties and Chrétiennot-Dinet using flow cytometry. Unicellular photosynthetic organisms are generally amenable to study using flow cytometry because of the autofluorescence provided by chlorophyll and other fluorophores used by the cells for the harvesting and control of sunlight, which allows such pigments to be studied without any staining of the cells. The different pigments present can be distinguished and identified on a cell-by-cell basis using flow cytometry, allowing researchers to deduce the different species present in the sample and help classify any new species found. O. tauri was immediately placed in the class Prasinophyceae based on the presence of characteristic chlorophyll pigments and Chlorophyceae-related carotenoids as well as cell ultrastructure, and its position was later confirmed by analysis of its 18S rDNA. Molecular phylogenetic analysis based on the 18S rDNA sequence led the definition of a new class, the Mamiellophyceae, that contains Ostreococcus species and placed them within the Bathycoccaceae family. Mamiellophyceae represent one of the ecologically most successful groups of eukaryotic, photosynthetic picoplankters in marine and likely also freshwater environments. Metagenomic and metabarcoding surveys revealed the presence of other members of the genus Ostreococcus in many oceanic regions. Four different species have been described to date : O. tauri, O. lucimarinus, O. mediterraneus and O spp. RCC809.

== Anatomy ==
The genus contains the smallest known free-living eukaryotic species, with an average size of 0.8 μm. The ultrastructure of cells in this genus have so far been characterised by remarkable simplicity, being coccoid cells lacking a cell wall and containing a single chloroplast, a single mitochondrion, and a single Golgi body as well as its nucleus. The genome sequence of three members of this genus is available: the 13 Mb nuclear genome of O. tauri RCC4221 published in 2006 and updated 2014; O. lucimarinus CCMP2514 and strain RCC809. The draft metabolic networks of these two Ostreococcus species were reconstructed from the KEGG database, thermodynamically constrained, elementally balanced, and functionally evaluated in 2012.
