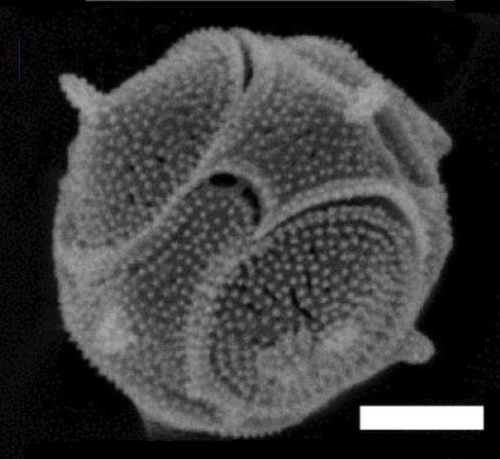
- Tetraparma pelagica

Scientific classification
- Domain: Eukaryota
- Clade: Sar
- Clade: Stramenopiles
- Division: Ochrophyta
- Superclass: Khakista
- Class: Bolidophyceae; L.Guillou & M.-J.Chrétiennot-Dinet 1999

Orders
- Bolidomonadales; Parmales

Synonyms
- Parmophyceae van den Hoek et al. 1995 nom. nud.

= Bolidophyceae =

Class of algae

Bolidophyceae is a class of photosynthetic heterokont picophytoplankton, and consist of less than 20 known species. They are distinguished by the angle of flagellar insertion and swimming patterns as well as recent molecular analyses. Bolidophyceae is the sister taxon to the diatoms (Bacillariophyceae). They lack the characteristic theca of the diatoms, and have been proposed as an intermediate group between the diatoms and all other heterokonts.

== Taxonomy ==
- Class Bolidophyceae Guillou & Chretiennot-Dinet 1999
  - Order Parmales Booth & Marchant 1987
    - Family Pentalaminaceae Marchant 1987
      - Genus Pentalamina Marchant 1987
        - Species Pentalamina corona Marchant 1987
    - Family Triparmaceae Booth & Marchant 1988
      - Genus Tetraparma Booth 1987
        - Species T. catinifera
        - Species T. gracilis
        - Species T. insecta Bravo-Sierra & Hernández-Becerril 2003
        - Species T. pelagica Booth & Marchant 1987
        - Species T. silverae Fujita & Jordan 2017
        - Species T. trullifera Fujita & Jordan 2017
      - Genus Triparma Booth & Marchant 1987
        - Species T. columacea Booth 1987
        - Species T. eleuthera Ichinomiya & Lopes dos Santos 2016
        - Species T. laevis Booth 1987
        - Species T. mediterranea (Guillou & Chrétiennot-Dinet) Ichinomiya & Lopes dos Santos 2016
        - Species T. pacifica (Guillou & Chrétiennot-Dinet) Ichinomiya & Lopes dos Santos 2016
        - Species T. retinervis Booth 1987
        - Species T. strigata Booth 1987
        - Species T. verrucosa Booth 1987

== Gallery ==
In the gallery, all scale bar represent 1 μm.

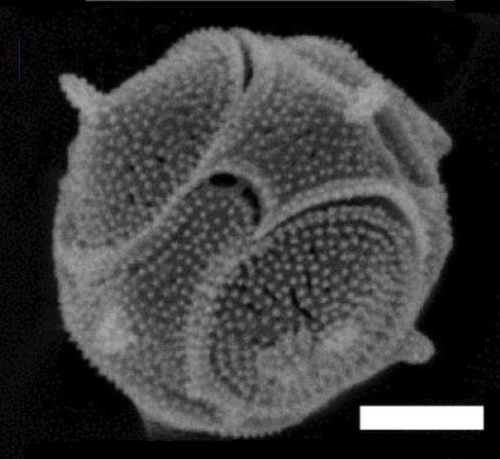
The silicified Tetraparma pelagica

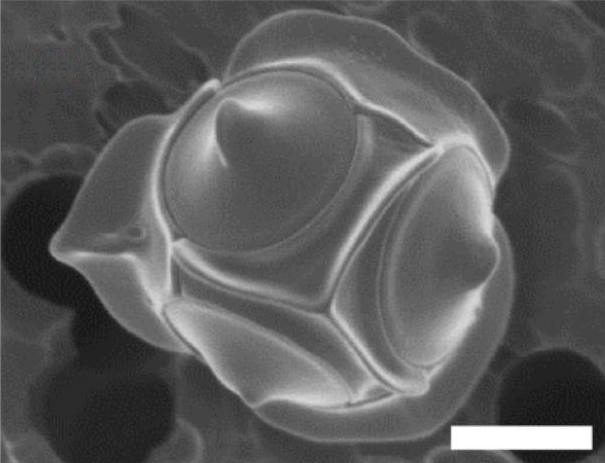
The silicified Triparma laevis f. inornata

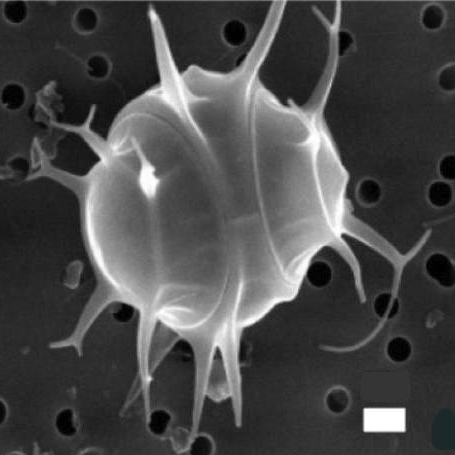
The silicified Pentalamina corona

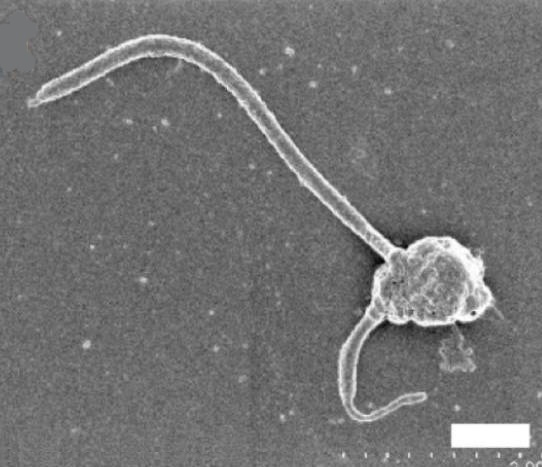
The flagellated Triparma eleuthera
