= Gordon Arthur Riley =

American marine biologist (1911–1985)

- Born: June 1, 1911
- Died: October 7, 1985 (aged 74)
- Education: Drury College; Washington University in St. Louis; Yale University
- Scientific career
- Fields: Biological oceanographer
- Workplaces: Yale University; Dalhousie University

Gordon Arthur Riley (1 June 1911 – 7 October 1985) was an American biological oceanographer most associated with his studies of the dynamics of plankton ecosystems.

== Early life and education ==
Born in Webb City, Missouri on June 1, 1911, Riley was educated within the state at Drury College and Washington University in St. Louis, graduating with a MS in embryology. He moved to Yale University in 1934, intending to work with the anatomist Ross Harrison, but instead became interested in limnology. Working with the ecologist G. Evelyn Hutchinson, he completed his doctoral thesis on the copper cycle of lakes in Connecticut. Subsequently, he continued to be interested in the productivity of lakes, but gradually expanded his studies to encompass salt water, ultimately moving into biological oceanography.

== Career ==
Riley's oceanographic work focused on the influences affecting the population ecology of plankton systems in coastal and open ocean waters. His early work correlated phytoplankton production with regulating factors such as nutrients, light and zooplankton abundance. From this empirical base he went on to develop ecosystem models that explained the annual cycle of plankton ecosystems, most notably in his analysis of the Georges Bank region. His final publication concerned patchiness in plankton, the potential role of diel vertical migration in this, and reflected on what this implied for plankton modelling studies, including his own 1946 study.

After an extended period at Yale, in 1965 Riley moved to become a professor, and the director, at the Institute of Oceanography at Dalhousie University. Much of his work continued to be in collaboration with researchers at the Woods Hole Oceanographic Institution. Towards the end of his life, Riley wrote a candid autobiography of his scientific life, in part to document the early days of oceanography as a discipline.
