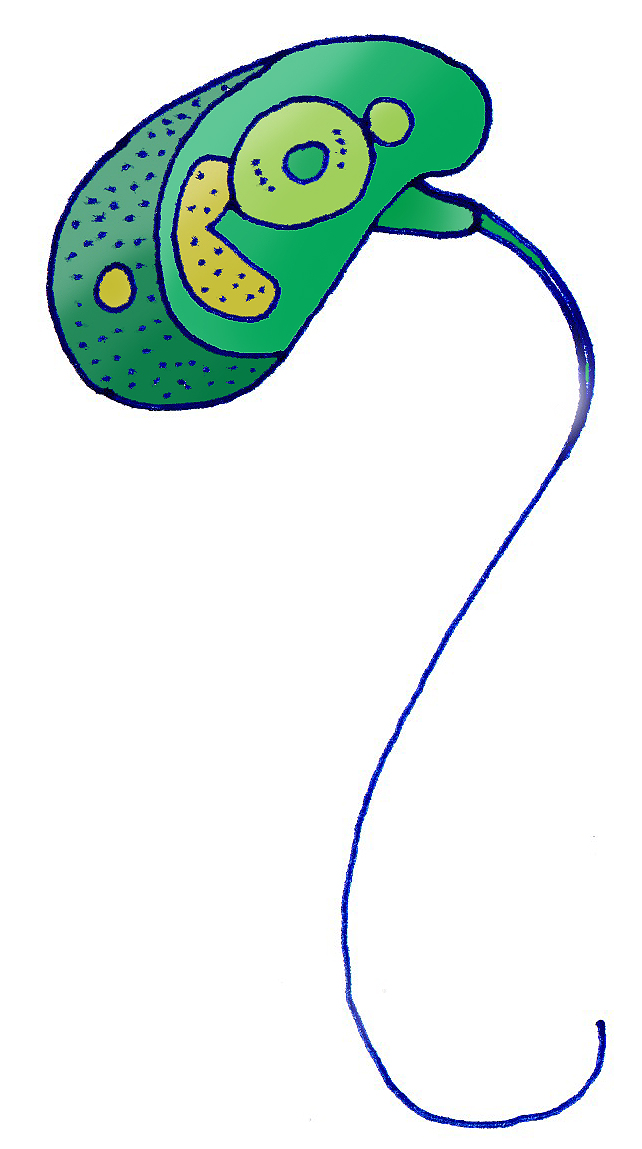
- Micromonas pusilla

Scientific classification
- Kingdom: Plantae
- Division: Chlorophyta
- Class: Mamiellophyceae
- Order: Mamiellales; Moestrup 1984

Families
- Bathycoccaceae Marin & Melkonian 2010; Mamiellaceae Moestrup 1984

Synonyms
- Micromonadales

= Mamiellales =

Order of algae

Mamiellales are an order of green algae in the class Mamiellophyceae. Their cells and flagella are covered with spiderweb-like scales of several types. Some species lack scales but possess pigments similar to those of the scale-bearing species.

== Taxonomy ==
Order Mamiellales Moestrup 1984 [Micromonadales]

- Family Bathycoccaceae Marin & Melkonian 2010
  - Genus Bathycoccus Eikrem & Throndsen 1990
  - Genus Ostreococcus Courties & Chrétiennot-Dinet 1995
- Family Mamiellaceae Moestrup 1984
  - Genus Mamiella Moestrup 1984
  - Genus Mantoniella Desikachary 1972
  - Genus Micromonas Manton & Parke 1960 non Borrel 1902
