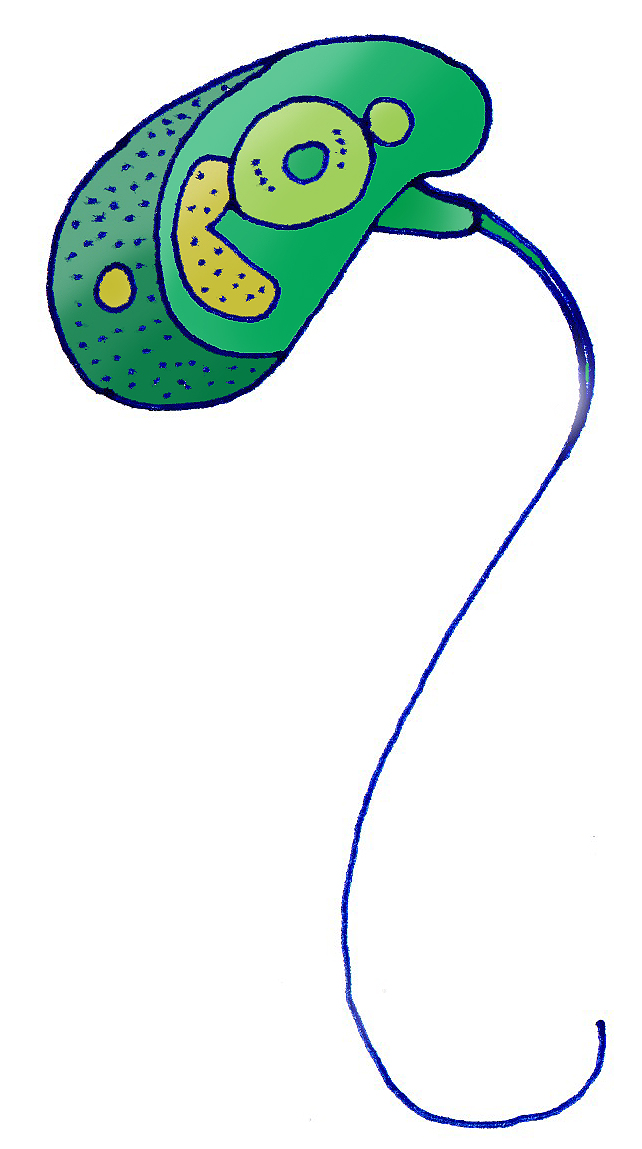
- Micromonas pusilla

Scientific classification
- Kingdom: Plantae
- Division: Chlorophyta
- Class: Mamiellophyceae; Marin & Melkonian, 2010

Orders
- Dolichomastigales; Mamiellales; Monomastigales

= Mamiellophyceae =

Class of algae

Mamiellophyceae is a class of green algae in the division Chlorophyta.

The class contains three orders containing 25 species.

- Order Dolichomastigales Marin & Melkonian (7 species)
- Order Mamiellales Moestrup (13 species)
- Order Monomastigales B.Marin & Melkonian (5 species)

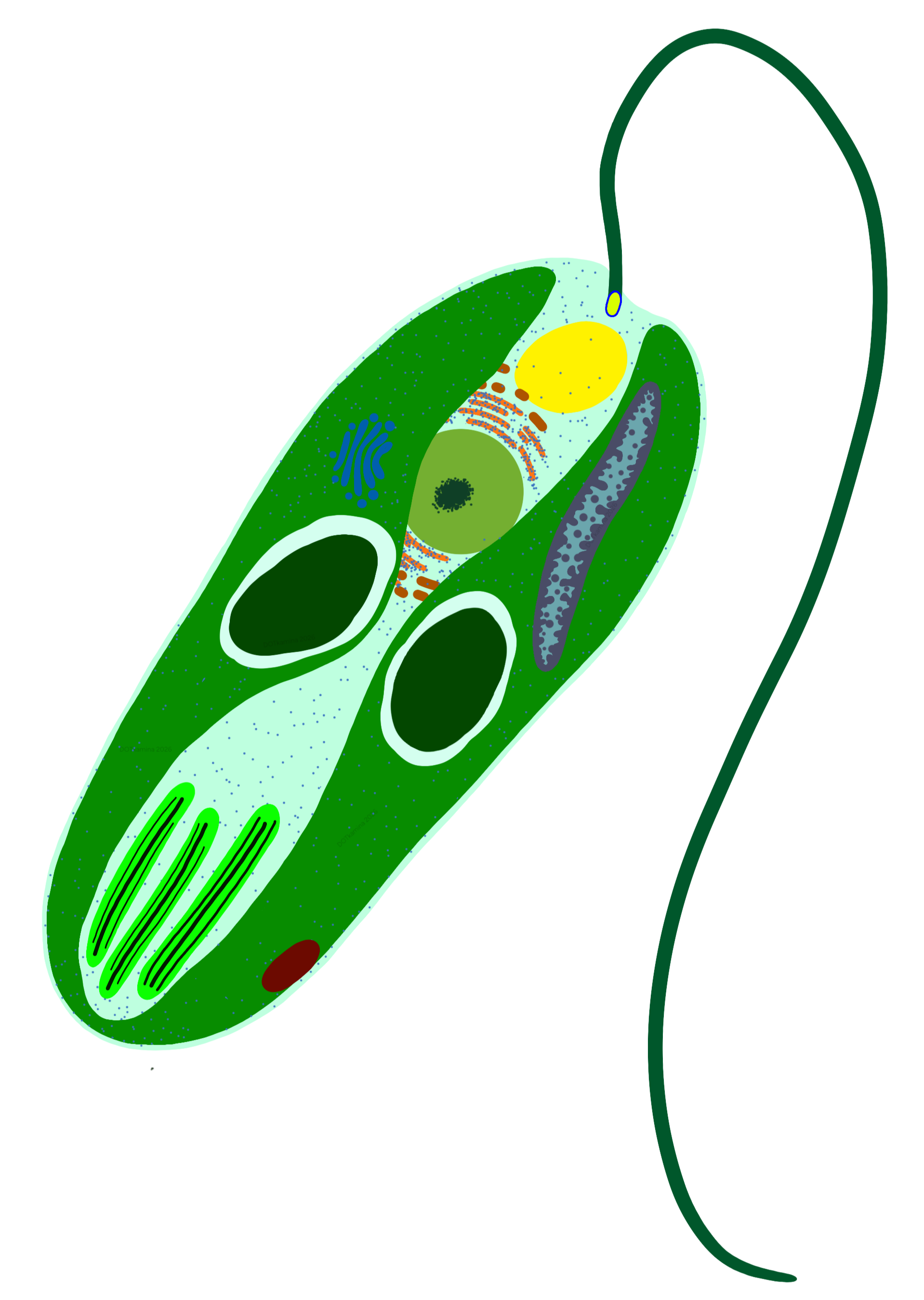
Monomastix opisthostigma (Monomastigales)

== See also ==
- List of Mamiellophyceae genera
