= List of Trebouxiophyceae genera =

This is a list of genera in the green algae class Trebouxiophyceae, sub-divided by order and family. Some genera have uncertain taxonomic placement and are listed as incertae sedis. Ranks without accepted subordinate taxa have been omitted. The list is based on the data available in AlgaeBase, the Integrated Taxonomic Information System (ITIS), the National Center for Biotechnology Information taxonomic database (NCBI), and other taxonomic databases.

== Order Chlorellales ==
=== Family Chlorellaceae ===
- Acanthosphaera
- Actinastrum
- Apodococcus
- Apricichlorella
- Auxenochlorella
- Ava
- Brachionococcus
- Carolibrandtia
- Caryosphaeroides
- Catena
- Chlorella
- Chloroparva
- Closteriopsis
- Compactochlorella
- Coronacoccus
- Coronastrum
- Cylindrocelis
- Dicellula
- Dicloster
- Dictyosphaerium
- Didymogenes
- Endolithella
- Geminella
- Gloeotila
- Golenkiniopsis
- Hegewaldia
- Helicosporidium
- Heynigia
- Hindakia
- Hormospora
- Hoshinea
- Kalenjinia
- Keratococcus
- Laetitia
- Lewiniosphaera
- Marasphaerium
- Marinichlorella
- Marvania
- Masaia
- Meyerella
- Micractinium
- Mucidosphaerium
- Muriella
- Nannochloris
- Nanochlorum
- Nomia
- Palmellochaete
- Parachlorella
- Picochloropsis
- Planktochlorella
- Podohedra
- Prototheca
- Pseudochloris
- Pseudosiderocelopsis
- Pumiliosphaera
- Siderocelis
- Zoochlorella

=== Family Coccosphaeraceae ===
- Coccosphaera

=== Family Oocystaceae ===
- Amphikrikos
- Campylocystis
- Catenocystis
- Chodatella
- Chodatellopsis
- Chondrosphaera
- Coenolamellus
- Crucigeniella
- Cryocystis
- Dactylococcus
- Dendrocystis
- Densicystis
- Didymocystis
- Droopiella
- Ecballocystis
- Ecballocystopsis
- Ecdysichlamys
- Echinocoleum
- Elongatocystis
- †Eremosimorpha
- Eremosphaera
- Ettliella
- Euchlorocystis
- Excentrosphaera
- Fotterella
- Franceia
- Glochiococcus
- Gloeocystopsis
- Gloeotaenium
- Gloxidium
- Granulocystis
- Granulocystopsis
- Hemichloris
- Juranyiella
- Keriochlamys
- Kirchneriellosaccus
- Lagerheimia
- Makinoella
- Micracantha
- Mycacanthococcus
- Mycotetraedron
- Neglectella
- Nephrochlamys
- Oocystaenium
- Oocystella
- Oocystidium
- Oocystis
- Oocystopsis
- Oonephris
- Pachycladella
- Palmellococcus
- Pilidiocystis
- Planctonema
- Planctonemopsis
- Planktosphaerella
- Pseudobohlina
- Pseudochlorococcum
- Pseudococcomyxa
- Quadricoccopsis
- Quadricoccus
- Rayssiella
- Reinschiella
- Reticulocystis
- Rhombocystis
- Saturnella
- Schizochlamydella
- Scotiella
- Selenoderma
- Sestosoma
- Siderocystopsis
- Tetrachlorella
- Thelesphaera
- Trigonidiella
- Trochiscia
- Willea

=== Family incertae sedis ===
- Ankistrodesmopsis
- Edaphochloris
- Picochlorum
- Uvulifera

== Order Microthamniales ==
- Family Microthamniaceae
  - Coleochlamys
  - Microthamnion

== Order Phyllosiphonales ==
- Family Phyllosiphonaceae
  - Phytophysa

== Order Prasiolales ==
=== Family Koliellaceae ===
- Ekerewekia
- Hortobagyiella
- Koliella
- Pseudochlorella
- Raphidonema
- Raphidonemopsis

=== Family Prasiolaceae ===
- Eaprasiola
- Mariprasiola
- Prasibo
- Prasiococcus
- Prasiola
- Prasiolopsis
- Prasiolotta
- Prasionella
- Prasionema
- Rosenvingiella
- Rosenvingiellopsis
- Schizogonium
- Vittaprasiola

=== Family Stichococcaceae ===
- Desmococcus
- Deuterostichococcus
- Diplosphaera
- Protostichococcus
- Pseudostichococcus
- Stichococcus
- Tetratostichococcus
- Tritostichococcus

=== Family incertae sedis ===
- Edaphochlorella

== Order Trebouxiales ==
=== Family Botryococcaceae ===
- Botryococcus
- Caulodendron
- Dichotomococcus
- Elaeophyton
- Gloeoactinium
- Obliquicauda
- Selenodictyon

=== Family Trebouxiaceae ===
- Asterochloris
- Dictyochloropsis
- Lobosphaera
- Myrmecia
- Parietochloris
- Symbiochloris
- Trebouxia
- Trochisciopsis
- Vulcanochloris

== Order Watanabeales ==
=== Family Watanabeaceae ===
- Calidiella
- Chloroidium
- Jaagichlorella
- Kalinella
- Massjukichlorella
- Mysteriochloris
- Phyllosiphon
- Polulichloris
- Viridiella
- Watanabea

== Order incertae sedis ==
=== Family Coccomyxaceae ===
- Choricystis
- Coccomyxa
- Dactylothece
- Diogenes
- Dispora
- Lusitania
- Medakamo
- Nannokloster
- Palmogloea
- Paradoxia

=== Family Dictyosphaeriaceae ===
- Dactylosphaerium
- Dimorphococcopsis

=== Family Micractiniaceae ===
- Phythelios

=== Family Ragelichloridaceae ===
- Navichloris
- Ragelichloris
- Thorsmoerkia

=== Family incertae sedis ===
- Apatococcus
- Autumnella
- Chloroidium
- Chloropyrula
- Elliptochloris
- Eremochloris
- Glaphyrella
- Koliellopsis
- Lemmermannia
- Leptochlorella
- Leptosira
- Lunachloris
- Neochlorella
- Pseudomarvania
- Rhopalosolen
- Xerochlorella
- Xylochloris
