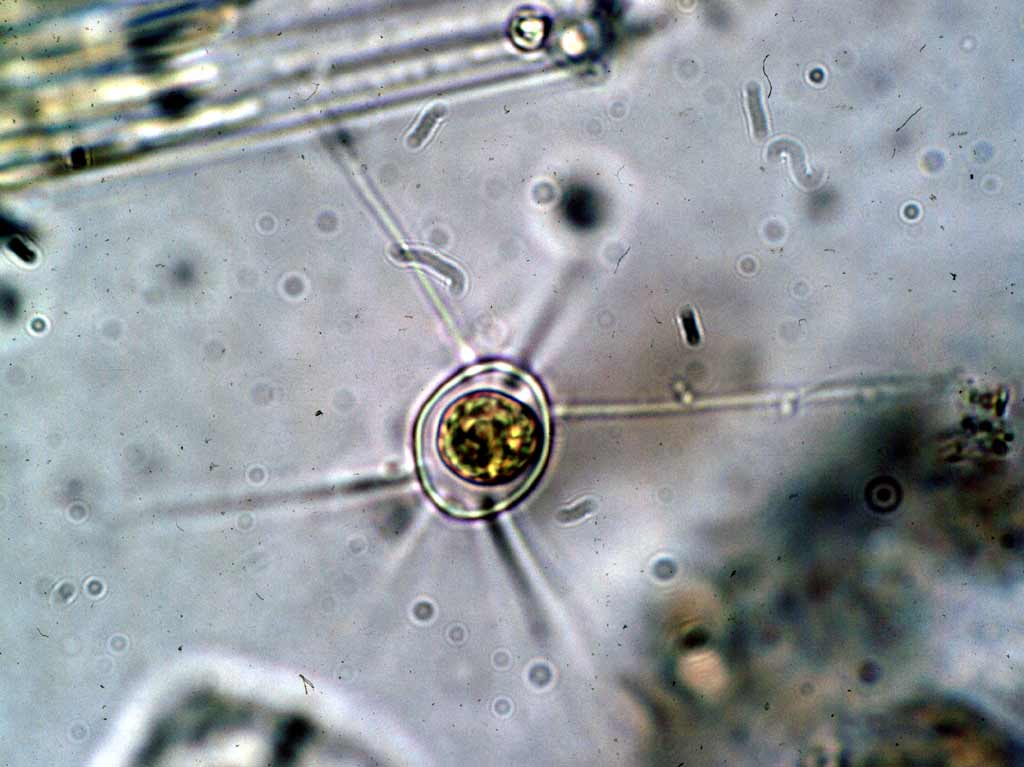

Scientific classification
- Kingdom: Plantae
- Division: Chlorophyta
- Class: Trebouxiophyceae
- Order: Chlorellales
- Family: Oocystaceae
- Genus: Lagerheimia; Chodat

Type species
- Lagerheimia genevensis Chodat

Species
- Lagerheimia chodatii; Lagerheimia ciliata; Lagerheimia genevensis; Lagerheimia subsalsa; Lagerheimia wratislaviensis

= Lagerheimia =

Genus of algae

Lagerheimia is a genus of green algae in the family Oocystaceae. It is commonly found in freshwater habitats all over the world, although some species are rare and have only been recorded from Europe or the United States.

The genus name of Lagerheimia is in honour of Nils Gustaf Lagerheim (1860–1926), who was a Swedish botanist, mycologist, phycologist, and pteridologist.

The genus was circumscribed by Giovanni Battista De Toni and Robert Hippolyte Chodat in Nuova Notarisia vol.6 on page 86-90 in 1895.

== Description ==
Lagerheimia consists of solitary cells. Cells are spherical, ellipsoidal, ovoid, polyhedral, or citriform (lemon-shaped), with one to several spines at the poles; some species also have spines at the equators. A layer of mucilage around the cell may be present. Cells contain a parietal chloroplast with one pyrenoid.

Species identification is based on the shape of the cells, placement and length of the spines, and presence or absence of tubercles at the base of the spines. Species with tubercles at the base of their spines have been classified in a separate genus, called Chodatella; however, modern authors do not recognize this split. The genus is similar to Franceia, which has spines distributed all over the cell surface. It may also be confused with single-celled forms of Desmodesmus, a genus that usually has coenobia of four or eight cells.

== Reproduction ==
Lagerheimia reproduces asexually by zoospores or autospores. Zoospores have two flagella. When reproducing with autospores, 2, 4, or 8 are formed within the mother cell and are released when the mother cell wall ruptures. Reports of sexual reproduction have not been confirmed.

== Taxonomy ==
Lagerheimia is placed in the family Oocystaceae. The cell wall ultrastructure of Lagerheimia subsalsa is similar to that of some species of Oocystis, and consists of several layers of microfibrils. Microfibrils are perpendicular from one layer to the next.

Because Lagerheimia appears similar to one-celled forms of Desmodesmus, some authors have doubted the validity of this genus. However, Lagerheimia strains are phylogenetically placed within the class Trebouxiophyceae. In its current circumscription, Lagerheimia is polyphyletic: some species are more closely related to Franceia than to other Lagerheimia species.
