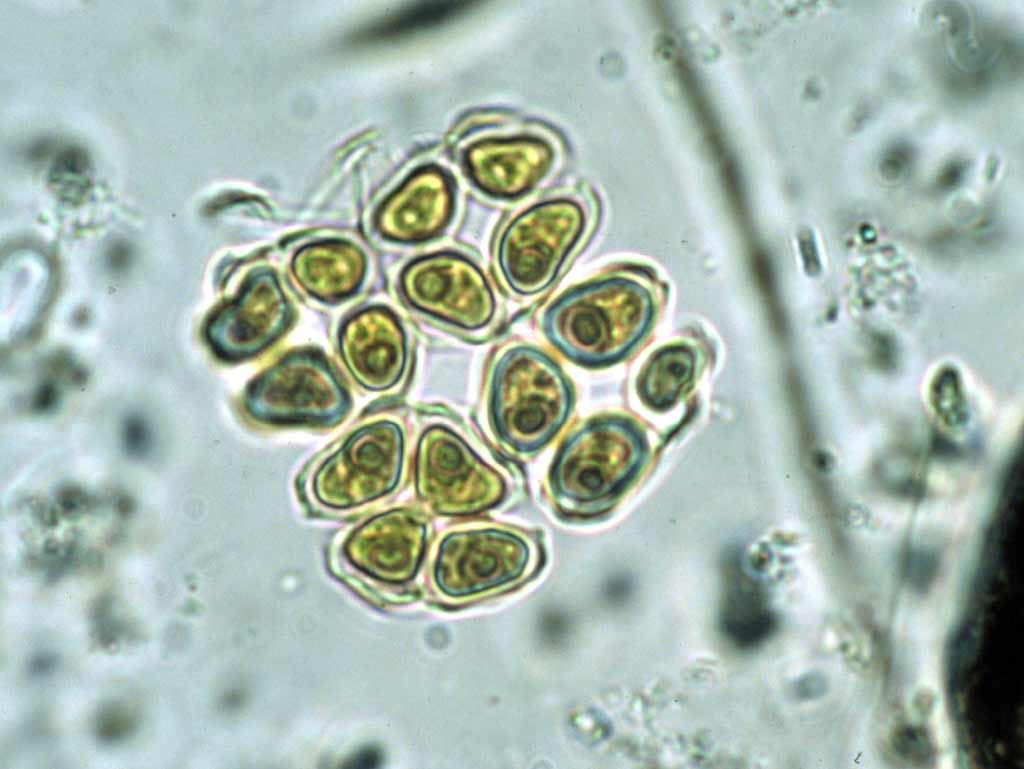

Scientific classification
- Kingdom: Plantae
- Division: Chlorophyta
- Class: Chlorophyceae
- Order: Sphaeropleales
- Family: Scenedesmaceae
- Genus: Crucigenia; Morren, 1830

Type species
- Crucigenia quadrata Morren

Species
- Crucigenia australis Playfair; Crucigenia cordata Playfair; Crucigenia cruxmichaeli (Reinsch) Playfair; Crucigenia fenestrata (Schmidle) Schmidle; Crucigenia floralis Playfair; Crucigenia lauterbornii (Schmidle) Schmidle; Crucigenia mucronata (G.M.Smith) Komárek; Crucigenia pyriformis Beck; Crucigenia quadrata Morren; Crucigenia quadriseta Seckt; Crucigenia setifera S.S.Wang; Crucigenia smithii (Bourrelly) Komárek; Crucigenia uzbekistanica Ergashev; Crucigenia variabilis S.S.Wang

= Crucigenia =

Genus of algae

Crucigenia is a genus of green algae in the family Scenedesmaceae. It is widespread, but not often abundant, in freshwater habitats (as phytoplankton) around the world.

== Description ==
Crucigenia consists of colonies of four cells in a flattened square shape, up to 16 μm in diameter; occasionally these colonies may be joined to form 8- or 16-celled compound coenobia. Colonies are embedded in a thin, gelatinous envelope. Cells are triangular, ovoid, ellipsoid, or rectangular, forming a small hole in the center of the colony. Cells are uninucleate (with a single nucleus) and with a single, parietal chloroplast that may or may not contain a pyrenoid.

Asexual reproduction occurs by the formation of autospores; four autospores are produced within the mother cell, and are released through a tear in the cell wall. Sexual reproduction has not been observed in this genus.

== Taxonomy ==
Crucigenia has a somewhat complex taxonomic history. It was first described by Charles François Antoine Morren in 1830 containing the type species C. quadrata, but then renamed Staurogenia by Friedrich Traugott Kützing without an explanation; later the name Crucigenia was noted to be the correct name.

Crucigenia is similar to the genus Tetrastrum. The genus Tetrastrum, unlike Crucigenia, may have spines or warts on its cell walls. It is also similar to the genus Willea, also known by its synonym Crucigeniella; in Willea the colony is overall rectangular, not square, and the hole in the center of the colony is rhomboidal.

The type species, Crucigenia quadrata is placed in the family Scenedesmaceae, but the genus is not monophyletic: other species, such as Crucigenia lauterbornii are phylogenetically within the order Chlorellales.

Species are distinguished from each other by the cell shape, and whether a pyrenoid is absent or present.
