= Didymocystis =

Scientific classification
- Clade: Viridiplantae
- Division: Chlorophyta
- Class: Trebouxiophyceae
- Order: Chlorellales
- Family: Oocystaceae
- Genus: Didymocystis; Korshikov

Type species
- Didymocystis inermis (Fott) Fott

Species
- Didymocystis comasii; Didymocystis inermis

Genus of algae

Didymocystis is a genus of green algae in the family Oocystaceae. It is found in freshwater ponds and lakes, and has been reported from several continents.

Didymocystis consists of two-celled colonies, termed coenobia, embedded in a mucilaginous matrix. The two cells are ellipsoidal, attached to each other by their long axes. The cell wall is smooth or covered in brownish ribs or warts. Cells contain a single, parietal chloroplast. Asexual reproduction occurs by the formation of two or four autospores arranged into one or two coenobia. The coenobia are released by the partial dissolution of the parental cell wall.

Didymocystis is similar to some species of Desmodesmus (formerly Scenedesmus), which can also form 2-celled colonies, but Didymocystis only produces two-celled colonies while Desmodesmus can produce four- or eight-celled colonies (or single cells). Some authors state that Didymocystis is distinguished by the lack of a pyrenoid in the chloroplast. This characteristic is unclear as some sources list Didymocystis as having pyrenoids, but some species have been transferred out of Didymocystis.
