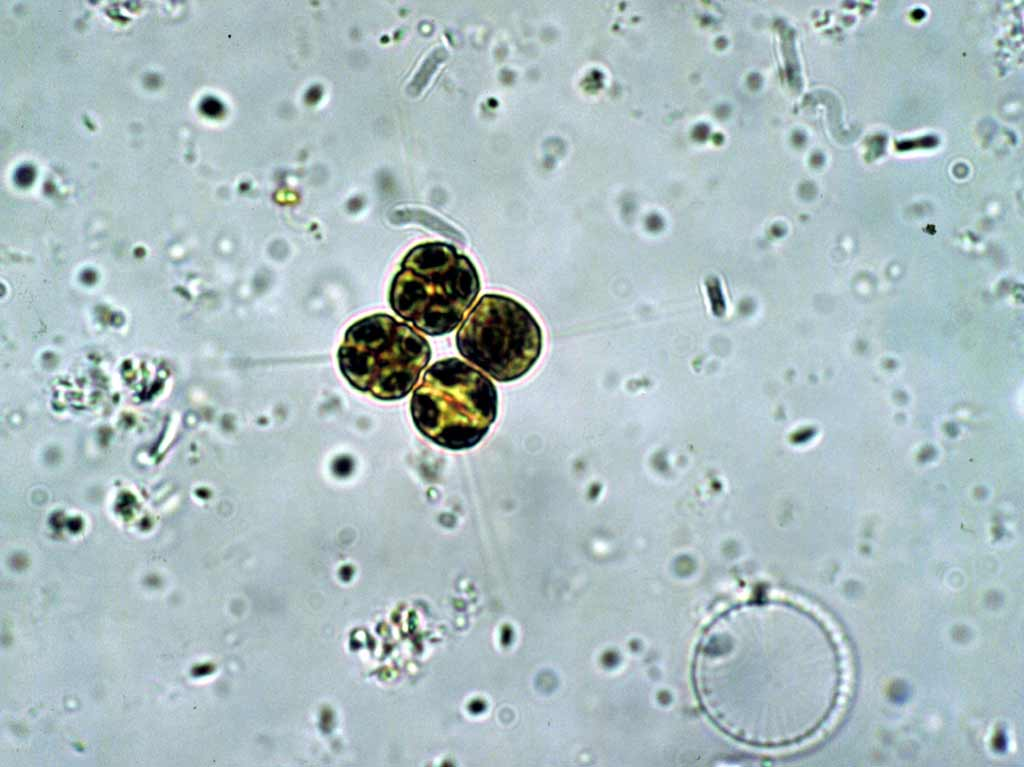
- Tetrastrum heteracarthum

Scientific classification
- Clade: Viridiplantae
- Division: Chlorophyta
- Class: Chlorophyceae
- Order: Sphaeropleales
- Family: Scenedesmaceae
- Genus: Tetrastrum; R. Chodat, 1895

Type species
- Tetrastrum heteracanthum (Nordstedt) Chodat, 1895

Species
- Tetrastrum asymmetricum; Tetrastrum constrictum; Tetrastrum elegans; Tetrastrum glabrum; Tetrastrum heteracanthum; Tetrastrum komarekii; Tetrastrum parallelum; Tetrastrum staurogeniaeforme; Tetrastrum tenuispinum; Tetrastrum triacanthum; Tetrastrum triangulare

= Tetrastrum =

Genus of algae

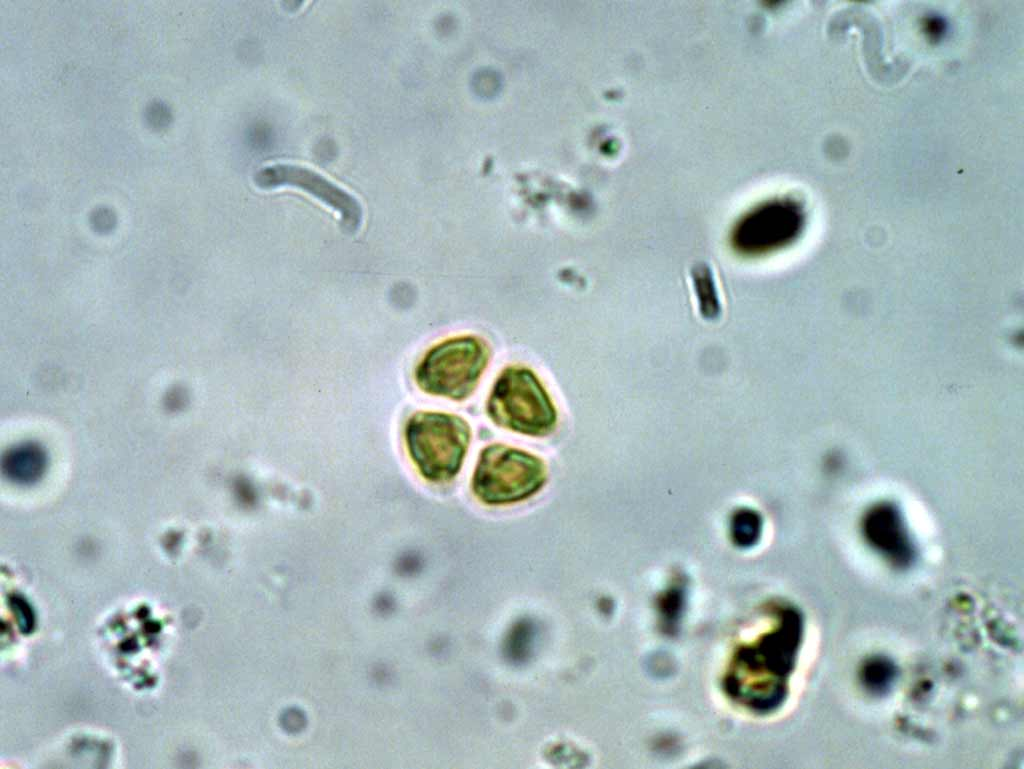
Tetrastrum glabrum

Tetrastrum is a genus of green algae (Chlorophyta). It is a common component of the phytoplankton of freshwater habitats, particularly eutrophic and alkaline waters.

Although traditionally classified in the family Scenedesmaceae in the class Chlorophyceae, it is phylogenetically more closely related to the genus Oocystis of the family Oocystaceae (Trebouxiophyceae).

== History ==
The genus Tetrastrum has a tangled taxonomic history. The name was first coined in 1895 by Robert Chodat for the species Tetrastrum heteracanthum, which was previously placed in the now-obsolete genus Staurogenia. Later, the genus Cohniella was created by Ludwig Julius Bruno Schröder, containing the species Cohniella staurogeniiforme. Later, Ernst Lemmermann merged the genus Cohniella into Tetrastrum.

== Description ==
Tetrastrum consists of four-celled colonies, which are sometimes aggregated together to form compound colonies. A layer of mucilage surrounding the colony is sometimes present. Cells are tightly joined in a flat plane, with or without a small space in the middle. Cells are ovoid, triangular, or trapezoidal, 2–11.5 μm long. Some species may have spines on the cells; these spines are up to 46 μm and show various morphologies, such as one long spine and one short, or multiple short spines. Cells contain one nucleus and one to four chloroplasts, with or without pyrenoids. The cell wall appears smooth in light microscopy, but is covered with small granules which are visible in scanning electron microscopy.

Tetrastrum reproduces asexually through the formation of autospores. Four autospores are formed, organized into the shape of the colony; these are released through a tear in the mother cell wall.

== Identification ==
Tetrastrum is similar to, and has been taxonomically confused with, other genera such as Crucigenia. The main morphological difference between the two is the mode of reproduction. In Tetrastrum, the daughter colonies are produced with the cells in the same orientation as the mother cells. In Crucigenia, the daughter colonies are produced with cells rotated 45° relative to the mother cells' orientation. Additionally, Tetrastrum may produce spines on its cells, while Crucigenia never does. Some species once classified in the genus Tetrastrum have been reclassified into the genus Lemmermannia. Lemmermannia has square colonies that lack spines, and can sometimes form compound colonies; in contrast, Tetrastrum has colonies with spines, or in the case of the spineless Tetrastrum glabrum, has oval and not square colonies).

Species of Tetrastrum are identified based on the size and shape of the cells, placement and length of the spines, and presence or absence of pyrenoids. Considerable variation exists within species, blurring species boundaries.
