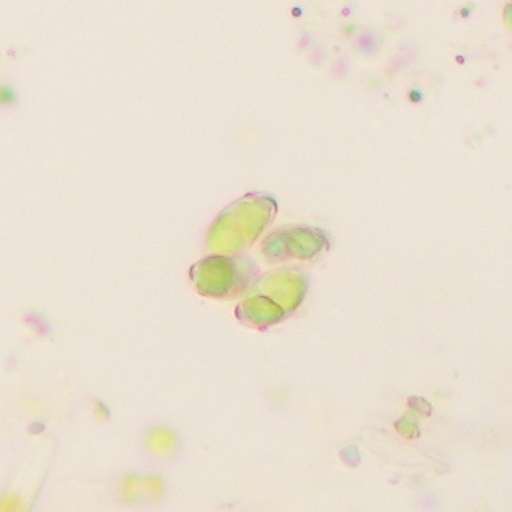
- Tetrachlorella ornata

Scientific classification
- Kingdom: Plantae
- Division: Chlorophyta
- Class: Trebouxiophyceae
- Order: Chlorellales
- Family: Oocystaceae
- Genus: Tetrachlorella; Korshikov

Type species
- Tetrachlorella alternans (G.M.Smith) Korshikov

Species
- Tetrachlorella alternans; Tetrachlorella coronata; Tetrachlorella elliptica; Tetrachlorella incerta; Tetrachlorella ornata

= Tetrachlorella =

Genus of algae

Tetrachlorella is a genus of green algae in the family Oocystaceae. It is present in freshwater habitats such as lakes, rivers, and reservoirs, as a component of the phytoplankton.

Tetrachlorella consists of colonies (termed coenobia up to 32 μm wide, usually embedded in a thin mucilaginous envelope. The coenobia are usually four-celled (occasionally two-celled), with the four cells arranged in one plane. Cells are oval, 4.5–20 μm long and 2–10 μm wide. The inner pair of cells are parallel and adjacent but only partially touching; the outer pair of cells are also parallel and attached to the inner pair of cells. The cell walls are smooth or covered with granules near the ends of the cells. Cells are uninuclate (with one nucleus) and contain one (or two) parietal chloroplast with a single pyrenoid.

Reproduction occurs exclusively asexually, via the formation of two or four autospores (per sporangium) arranged into coenobia. The coenobia are released through a tear in the parental cell walls.

Species are distinguished on the details of cell and colony morphology, namely the typical number of cells per coenobium and the cell wall ornamentation (or lack thereof).
