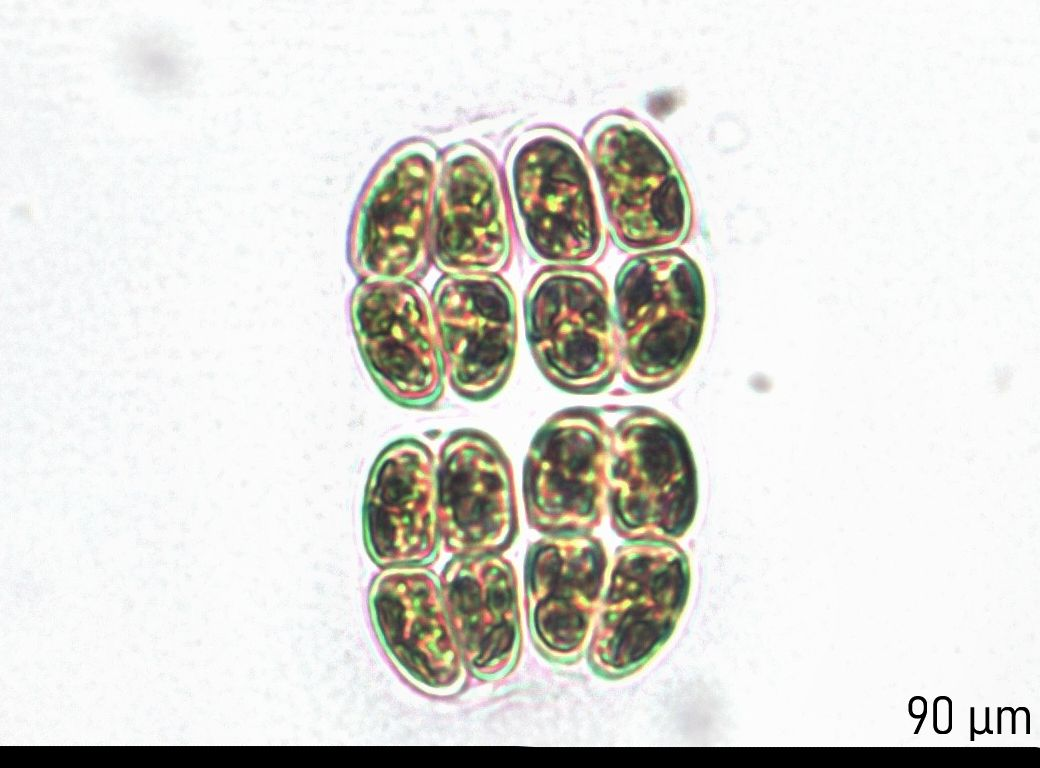
- Willea rectangularis

Scientific classification
- Clade: Viridiplantae
- Division: Chlorophyta
- Class: Trebouxiophyceae
- Order: Chlorellales
- Family: Oocystaceae
- Genus: Willea; Schmidle

Species
- Willea apiculata; Willea crucifera; Willea irregularis

= Willea =

Genus of algae

Westella is a genus of green algae in the family Oocystaceae. It is found in freshwater habitats such as ponds and lakes, as part of the phytoplankton. It has a cosmopolitan distribution.

Willea consists of four-celled (rarely two-celled) colonies (termed coenobia); the coenobia may be aggregated to form compound colonies of 100 cells or more, arranged in a single plane. The cells are oval to cylindrical, arranged in a rectangle forming a rhomboidal gap. The cell walls are smooth. Cells are uninucleate, and contain a single parietal chloroplast; the chloroplast has a pyrenoid but this may be difficult to observe. Asexual reproduction occurs by the formation of autospores, which are organized into coenobia; they enlarge with the cell wall, which eventually dissolves, releasing the new cells. Sexual reproduction and flagellated stages are not known in this genus.

A number of species formerly included in the genus Crucigeniella are now placed in Willea; the name Crucigeniella is illegitimate.
