= Amphikrikos =

Scientific classification
- Kingdom: Plantae
- Division: Chlorophyta
- Class: Trebouxiophyceae
- Order: Chlorellales
- Family: Oocystaceae
- Genus: Amphikrikos; Korshikov

Type species
- Amphikrikos minutissimus Korshikov

Species
- Amphikrikos bicingulis; Amphikrikos buderi; Amphikrikos hexacosta; Amphikrikos heynigii; Amphikrikos minutissimus; Amphikrikos nanus; Amphikrikos tetrangulata; Amphikrikos variabilis

Genus of algae

Amphikrikos is a genus of algae in the family Oocystaceae. It is found in freshwater and has been reported from most continents.

Amphikrikos consists of solitary, planktonic cells about 3–13 μm long and 2–9 μm wide. Cells are barrel-shaped, cylindrical, ellipsoid or broadly oval, with rounded poles. The cell may be surrounded by a thin, structureless mucilage layer. The cell wall is smooth, or covered with dark-brown incrustations on the surface which appear as granules or ribs, mainly near the equator and poles of the cell. Cells contain one (or two) chloroplasts, which is/are parietal and may have or lack a pyrenoid. Asexual reproduction occurs by the formation of typically four (rarely 2 or 8) autospores per cell; these are released through a tear in the mother cell wal.
