= Elongatocystis =

Scientific classification
- Kingdom: Plantae
- Division: Chlorophyta
- Class: Trebouxiophyceae
- Order: Chlorellales
- Family: Oocystaceae
- Genus: Elongatocystis; Krienitz & C. Bock, 2011
- Species: E. ecballocystiformis

Binomial name
- Elongatocystis ecballocystiformis Krienitz & C. Bock, 2011

Genus of green algae

Elongatocystis is an autotrophic green alga in the Oocystaceae family that is defined by its elongated type cell. This genus was discovered in a rockpool at Belvedere River, Mpumalanga, South Africa and described by Krienitz and Bock in 2011 along with two other strains of Oocystaceae. Its discovery and genetic analysis determined that Oocystis ecballocystiformis should be removed. In its place, the genus Elongatocystis was proposed to more accurately represent the phylogenetic tree.

Morphologically, the cells of Elongatocystis are elongated and occasionally bent-shaped. It is surrounded by a mucilaginous envelope and has smooth cell walls that are uniform in thickness. Elongatocystis is known to possess around 1 to 4 chloroplasts in each cell, which commonly results in some thickening in the central region where it may interconnect with other chloroplasts. The vegetative cells, or actively growing cells, are approximately 8–16 × 3–8 μm in size and reproduce asexually through autosporulation. Elongatocystis cells exhibiting the bent boomerang shape are observed with divided nuclei and chloroplasts suggesting that its morphology aids in the division process.

Elongatocystis is closely related to Ecballocystis, through 18S rDNA phylogeny, which is also a part of the Oocystaceae family. Additionally, the elongated shape of its cell could be attributed to a deformation or its relation to the genus Planctonema which could have further implications for the Oocystaceae.

== Etymology ==
The name for Elongatocystis is derived from its elongated type cell, with elongatus derived from Latin for elongated and cysta meaning cyst. It was coined by Krienitz and Bock in order to accommodate for Oocystis ecballocystiformis.

== History of knowledge ==
Elongatocystis was first observed by Krienitz and Bock through an article published in 2011 detailing three new strains of Oocystaceae that were collected in inland waters of Africa. Specifically, Elongatocystis was collected in a rockpool at Belvedere River, Mpumalanga, South Africa. The samples were isolated from the water samples by microcapillaries following the collection and were grown in suspensions under a 14 hour to 10 hour light-dark schedule. The morphology of each strain was observed using light microscopy with differential interference contrast. A polymerase chain reaction (PCR) test was also performed in order to compare the gene sequences of the three strains against other Oocystaceae sequences obtained from the GenBank database. To determine where each organism would lie on the phylogenetic tree, maximum likelihood (ML), maximum parsimony (MP), distance (neighborjoining; NJ), and Bayesian analyses (MB) methods were used. These tests resulted in the distinguishing of Elongatocystis from the rest of the Oocystaceae family. Currently, Elongatocystis ecballocystiformis is the sole species in the genus.

== Habitat and ecology ==
Elongatocystis was first found in a rockpool at Belvedere River, Mpumalanga, South Africa. It is an autotrophic alga that resides in inland waters which suggests it is a primary producer in its ecological habitat and likely plays a role in the food web of other organisms.

== Description of the organism ==
=== Morphology ===
Elongatocystis has a vivid green colour and a jelly-like consistency. Its cells have a smooth wall and are elongated in shape. It is also covered by a thick mucilaginous envelope which surrounds the cells. However, this envelope can be absent depending on the stage of the cell. The vegetative cells of Elongatocystis are broadly oval in shape with uniform thickness spanning the membrane. These cells are observed to be approximately 8–16 × 3–8 μm in size. Many cells assimilate particles and oil droplets are observed in the daughter cells along with one to two parietal pyrenoid-bearing through-shaped chloroplasts. These chloroplasts can be thickened in the central area where it has interconnections with another. Elongatocystis bent-shaped and elongated cells are hypothesised to be due to deformation or its relation to the genus Planctonema.

=== Life cycles ===
Elongatocystis reproduces asexually with the mother cells each producing two, four, or eight autospores which then again propagate inside the mother cells, forming large grandmother cells. The grandmother cells house mother cells undergoing different developmental stages. Though Elongatocystis are most often solitary cells, they have also been observed to form colonies, usually with 2–4–8 daughter cells. Elongated, bent cells were also observed with divided nuclei and chloroplasts but no autospores. This bent shape is theorised to have some functional benefit in the process of division. No sexual reproduction is observed in Elongatocystis.

=== Genetics ===
Elongatocystis is closely related to Ecballocystis in 18s rRNA phylogeny and has an established sister lineage with Crucigeniella rectangularis and Makinoella tosaensis.

== Practical importance ==
The genus Elongatocystis was first formed in order to accommodate the former Oocystis ecballocystiformis. The separation of Elongatocystis from Oocystis raised uncertainty regarding diversity and genetic classification for the Oocystaceae family. This suggests that further taxonomic studies are required in order to accurately determine the placement of Oocystaceae family in the phylogenetic tree. Other than the implications it has on the Oocystaceae family, Elongatocystis has no other discovered practical importance.
