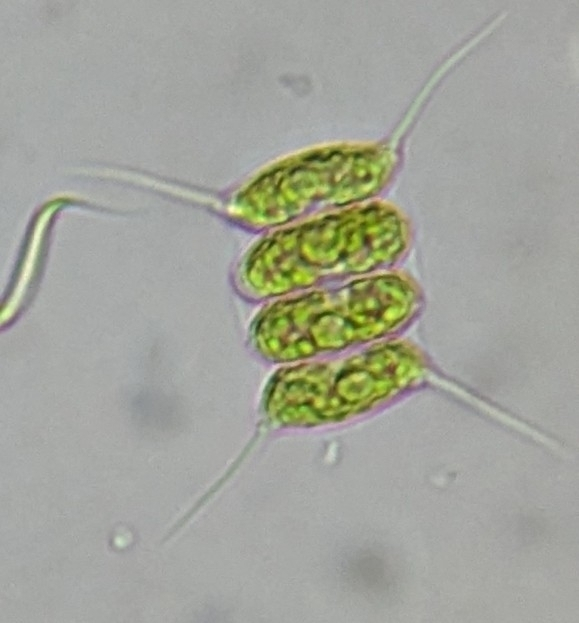
- Desmodesmus maximus

Scientific classification
- Kingdom: Plantae
- Division: Chlorophyta
- Class: Chlorophyceae
- Order: Sphaeropleales
- Family: Scenedesmaceae
- Genus: Desmodesmus (Chodat) S.S.An, T.Friedl & E.Hegewald

Type species
- Desmodesmus communis (E.Hegewald) E.Hegewald

Species
- D. communis; D. costato-granulatus; D. bicellularis; D. serratus; D. denticulatus; D. lefevrei; D. arthrodesmiformis; D. sp. Hegewald 1987-51; D. subspicatus; D. hystrix; D. opoliensis; D. pannonicus; D. perforatus; D. pirkollei; D. sp. CL1; D. maximus; D. tropicus; D. komarekii; D. multivariabilis; D. pleiomorphus; D. fennicus; D. armatus; D. sp. Tow8/18P-4W; D. sp. WTwin8/18P-2d; D. sp. Tow8/18P-14W; D. sp. NDem6/3P-3d; D. sp. Tow6/16T-10W; D. sp. Tow8/18T-5W; D. sp. Tow8/18T-23W; D. sp. Tow8/18P-3W; D. sp. Itas6/3T-2d; D. sp. Tow6/16T-16W; D. sp. NDem9/21T-10W; D. sp. Tow6/3T-11d; D. sp. Tow6/16T-8W; D. sp. Tow8/18P-1d; D. sp. Tow8/18P-13W; D. sp. Tow8/18P-25W; D. sp. Tow8/18T-25W; D. sp. Tow6/16T-31W; D. asymmetricus; D. sp. Mary6/3T-2d; D. sp. Tow10/11T-2W; D. sp. Tow6/16T-17W; D. sp. Tow8/18T-10W; D. sp. Tow10/11T-12W; D. sp. Tow6/16T-35W; D. sp. Tow10/11T-1W; D. sp. Tow10/11T-17W; D. sp. Tow6/16T-9W; D. sp. Tow6/16T-15W; D. sp. Tow10/11T-8W; D. cuneatus; D. sp. Tow6/16T-26W; D. sp. Tow10/11T-3W; D. sp. Tow10/11T-6W; D. sp. Itas2/24S-1d; D. sp. Itas6/3T-2W; D. sp. Itas8/18S-6d; D. sp. Tow6/16T-32W

= Desmodesmus =

Genus of algae

Desmodesmus is a genus of green algae in the family Scenedesmaceae.

== Morphology ==
Desmodesmus consists of colonies of two, four, eight or 16 cells arranged in a row. Cells are ellipsoidal to ovoid, joined to each other by their longer sides. The terminal cells of a colony (and sometimes the medial cells as well) are usually armed with spines. Cell walls may also be covered in ridges, warts, and net-like structures. Cells contain one parietal chloroplast, containing one pyrenoid.

Desmodesmus species usually produce colonies of more than one cell, but single cells (unicells) may be found as well. These single cells may be confused with Lagerheimia, a genus of single-celled algae.

The cell wall of Desmodesmus consists of an outer layer with a net-like structure, with "rosettes" of tubes underneath. These structures are not visible under light microscopy, and only become visible under a scanning electron microscope (SEM) or transmission electron microscope.

== Reproduction ==
Desmodesmus typically reproduces asexually by forming autospores. Sexual reproduction has been observed a few times.

== Taxonomy ==
Species in the genus Desmodesmus have long been placed in the related genus Scenedesmus. However, Scenedesmus was found to be polyphyletic, and was split up into several genera (corresponding to the subgenera within Scenedesmus). Desmodesmus has ornamented cell walls, while Scenedesmus sensu stricto lacks ornamentation.

A factor that has long complicated the taxonomy of Scenedesmus and its related taxa is the fact that these algae show considerable phenotypic plasticity. This plasticity has led taxonomists in the past to designate thousands of infraspecific names based on minute changes in spine morphology or cell shape. However, in laboratory conditions the same strain may produce an array of different morphologies.

Currently, Desmodesmus species are delimited using a combination of ultrastructural features and molecular data. In particular, the locus ITS-2 provides enough variability to distinguish between species.

== Habitat ==
Desmodesmus is found in the plankton of habitats such as ponds and lakes, particularly in eutrophic waters. It is one of the most common types of freshwater plankton. They can also be found in soils and biological soil crusts.

== Ecology ==
Desmodesmus species tolerate a wide range of habitats and conditions; this also makes them easy to culture. In response to herbivory from predators such as Daphnia, Desmodesmus may develop spines or other defensive features.

== Pathogenicity ==
Desmodesmus armatus is the only chlorophyll-containing organism confirmed to have caused human infections in immunocompetent individuals. All known cases involved open injuries occurring in fresh water. Desmodesmus is presumably a mixotrophic organism (as are plenty of other genera of algae), obtaining most of its food photosynthetically but capable of heterotrophy in unfavourable (poorly lit) conditions (such as within a deep puncture wound).

Non-photosynthesizing algae, on the other hand, have been long known to assume pathogenic roles, either facultatively or obligatorily. A well-studied example is Prototheca.
