= Schizochlamys =

Scientific classification
- Clade: Viridiplantae
- Division: Chlorophyta
- Class: Chlorophyceae
- Order: Sphaeropleales
- Family: Schizochlamydaceae
- Genus: Schizochlamys; Braun ex Kützing, 1849

Type species
- Schizochlamys gelatinosa Braun

Species
- Schizochlamys compacta Prescott; Schizochlamys gelatinosa A.Braun; Schizochlamys tetradiformis H.U.Ling

Genus of algae

Schizochlamys is a genus of green algae in the family Schizochlamydaceae. It is found in freshwater habitats and is planktonic. The name originates from the Ancient Greek σχίζω (skhĭ́zō, meaning "to split, cleave") and χλαμύς (khlamús, "cloak" or "mantle").

Schizochlamys forms many-celled colonies that are microscopic, but sometimes becoming large enough to see with the naked eye. Cells are distributed throughout the colony in aggregations of two or four, and are embedded in mucilage. Near the cells are fragments of the mother cell wall that are left behind. Cells have one to 16 very long pseudoflagella, and inside bear two contractile vacuoles and one or two chloroplasts with (sometimes with pyrenoids), which are for starch production. However, Schizochlamys appears to store energy mainly in the form of lipids.

The taxonomy of Schizochlamys is incomplete, with most species imperfectly known. In some classifications, the genus Schizochlamydella is separate from Schizochlamys in having cells with one to 16 pseudoflagella arranged in groups of two to four, while Schizochlamys sensu stricto has cells with exactly 16 pseudoflagella in four groups.
