= Pseudobohlina =

Scientific classification
- Clade: Viridiplantae
- Division: Chlorophyta
- Class: Trebouxiophyceae
- Order: Chlorellales
- Family: Oocystaceae
- Genus: Pseudobohlina; Bourrelly, 1948
- Species: P. americana

Binomial name
- Pseudobohlina americana Bourrelly, 1948

Genus of algae

Pseudobohlina (also spelled Pseudobohlinia) is a genus of green algae in the class Trebouxiophyceae. As of February 2022, the only species was Pseudobohlina americana. It is a rare genus, found in freshwater habitats.

Pseudobohlinia is a colonial organism consisting of a large number of cells irregularly embedded in an amorphous, gelatinous thallus. The cells are ellipsoidal, and covered with spines distributed irregularly over the cell wall, particularly around the poles. Cells contain one to four parietal chloroplasts with pyrenoids. Reproduction occurs by the formation of autospores.
