= Planctonema =

Scientific classification
- Kingdom: Plantae
- Division: Chlorophyta
- Class: Trebouxiophyceae
- Order: Chlorellales
- Family: Oocystaceae
- Genus: Planctonema; Schmidle

Type species
- Planctonema lauterbornii Schmidle

Species
- Planctonema sp. M110-1; Planctonema sp. J45-9; Planctonema lauterbornii

Genus of algae

Planctonema is a genus of green algae in the class Trebouxiophyceae. It is found in freshwater habitats as plankton, and is found worldwide. It is dominant in lakes during the summer and autumn months.

The classification of Planctonema has varied historically. It was originally described by Wilhelm Schmidle as a heterokont, and has also been placed in the family Ulotrichaceae. Molecular phylogenetic evidence has shown that Planctonema is closely related to members of the family Oocystaceae, and AlgaeBase places Planctonema in Oocystaceae. However, it lacks the cell wall ultrastructure characteristic of the family.

== Description ==
Planctonema consists of short, uniseriate filaments surrounded in a common mucilaginous sheath. Individual cells. Individual cells are spaced apart equidistantly, or end-to-end in separate pairs; the space between cells is filled with mucilage. Cells are cylindrical, with a parietal, plate-like chloroplast without pyrenoids or starch. The nucleus is located in the median constriction of the chloroplast. At the ends of the cell poles are vacuoles containing conspicuous oil globules.

Vegetative reproduction occurs by the fragmentation of filaments. Sexual reproduction is unknown.

Similar genera include Psephonema (formerly considered to be synonymous with Planctonema), and Planctonemopsis, described in 2017. Psephonema has shorter cells than Planctonema (with a length–width ratio of 1.5–2, while Planctonemopsis has chloroplasts with pyrenoids).
