= Schizochlamydella =

Scientific classification
- Kingdom: Plantae
- Division: Chlorophyta
- Class: Trebouxiophyceae
- Order: Chlorellales
- Family: Oocystaceae
- Genus: Schizochlamydella; Korshikov, 1953

Type species
- Schizochlamydella delicatula (West) Korshikov

Species
- Schizochlamydella orbicularis

Genus of algae

Schizochlamydella is a genus of green algae in the class Trebouxiophyceae.

Schizochlamydella consists of solitary cells or spherical/amorphous colonies of cells embedded in a thin, structureless mucilaginous envelope. Cells are generally dispersed throughout the colony, along with remnants of the mother cell walls. Cells are spherical, 2–10 μm in diameter with a smooth cell wall. There is a single nucleus with a single parietal chloroplast and one to several pyrenoids, but the pyrenoid may be difficult to detect without staining. Asexual reproduction occurs through the formation of autospores (two to four per sporangium and arranged tetrahedrally), which are then released through a tear in the cell wall.

The taxonomic status of Schizochlamydella is unclear. The type species Schizochlamydella delicatula was transferred to Phaeoschizochlamys, a heterokont alga in the order Phaeothamniales. However, this is not accepted by all taxonomists. For example, in their 1983 monograph, Jiří Komárek and Bohuslav Fott considered Phaeoschizochlamys to be a similar alga with brown plastids, and the application of the name Phaeoschizochlamys was to a green alga was mistaken.
