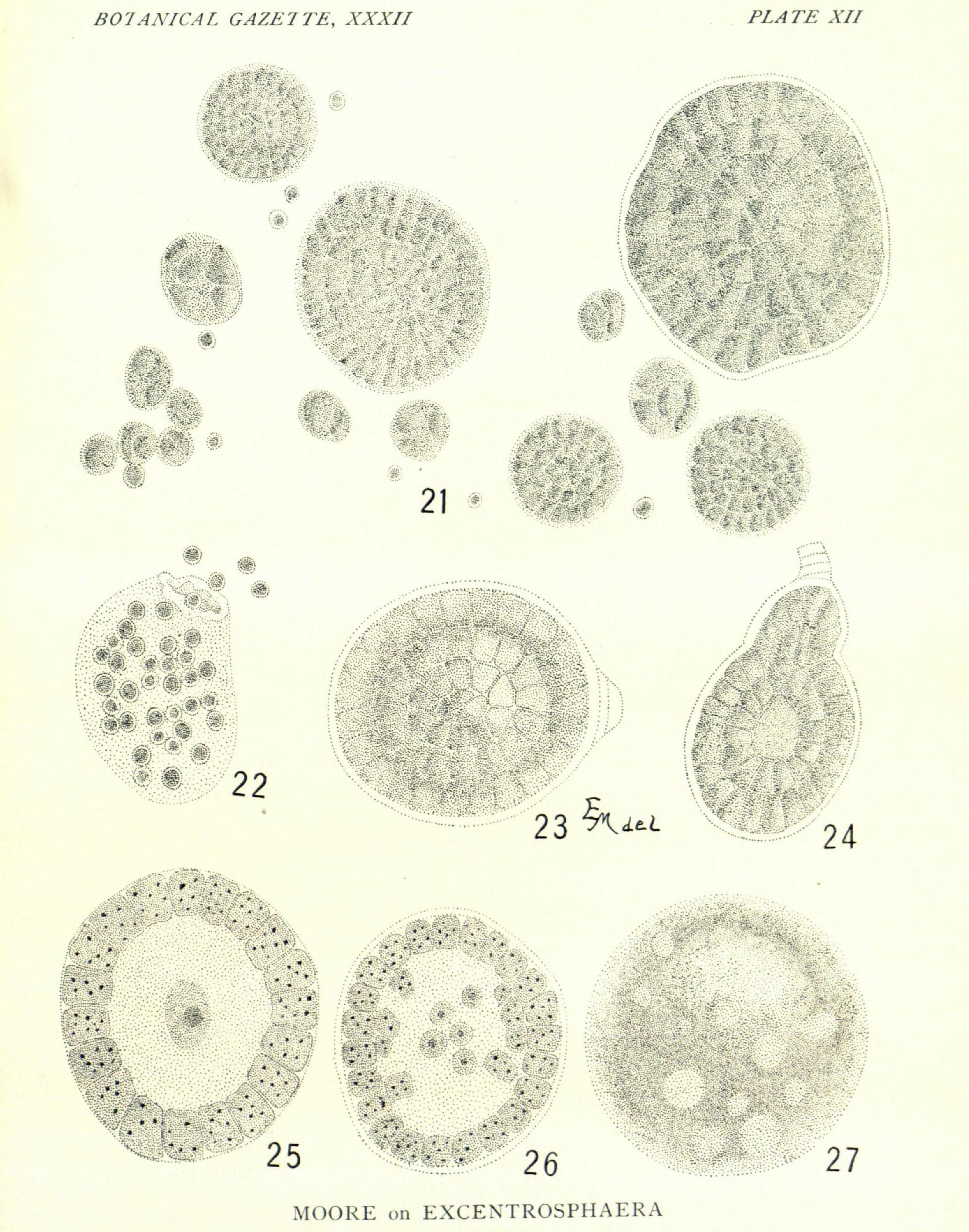

Scientific classification
- Kingdom: Plantae
- Division: Chlorophyta
- Class: Trebouxiophyceae
- Order: Chlorellales
- Family: Eremosphaeraceae

Genera
- Excentrosphaera; Neglectella

= Eremosphaeraceae =

Family of algae

The Eremosphaeraceae are a family of green algae in the order Chlorellales.

The type genus, Eremosphaera, is generally considered to be part of the family Oocystaceae.
