= Chaetomnion pyriferum =

Scientific classification
- Kingdom: Plantae
- Division: Chlorophyta
- Class: Chlorophyceae
- Order: Chaetophorales
- Family: Chaetophoraceae
- Genus: Chaetomnion
- Species: C. pyriferum

Binomial name
- Chaetomnion pyriferum Skuja, 1937

Species of algae

Chaetomnion pyriferum is a species of green algae in the family Chaetophoraceae. It is native to China, growing on leaves of Potamogeton, an aquatic plant.

Chaetomnion pyriferum consists of thalli forming tufts of branched filaments growing in a radial pattern, growing up to 1 mm wide. The primary filaments are prostrate, while secondary filaments are mostly erect and branching; filaments terminate in a long, hyaline unicellular hair. Cells are cylindrical or barrel-shaped, 8–17 μm in diameter, and contain a parietal chloroplast with one or two pyrenoids. Chaetomnion pyriferum reproduces asexually via large aplanospores, which are 35–48 μm long, borne on the ends of the secondary branches.
