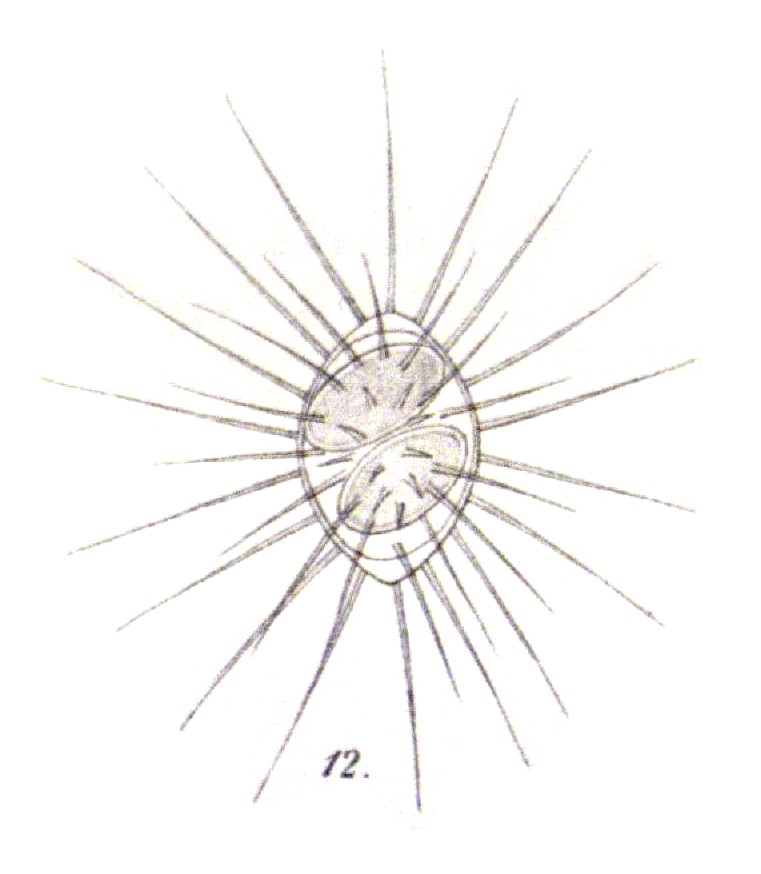
- Franceia droescheri

Scientific classification
- Clade: Viridiplantae
- Division: Chlorophyta
- Class: Trebouxiophyceae
- Order: Chlorellales
- Family: Oocystaceae
- Genus: Franceia; Lemmermann

Type species
- Franceia ovalis (Francé) Lemmermann

= Franceia =

Genus of algae

Franceia is a genus of green algae belonging to the family Oocystaceae. The genus was first described by Ernst Lemmermann in 1898. The genus name of Franceia is in honour of Raoul Heinrich Francé (1874-1943), who was an Austro-Hungarian botanist, microbiologist as well as a natural and cultural philosopher and popularizer of science. The genus is found in freshwater plankton and has a cosmopolitan distribution, but the species are rare and poorly known, and many require revision.

== Description ==
Franceia consists of solitary cells in a thin mucilaginous envelope (rarely two to four cells which are retained within the expanded mother cell wall). Cells are oval to ellipsoid, 3.5–15 μm long, with several spines of variable length distributed irregularly over the cell wall. Young cells contain a single chloroplast, while older cells contain multiple; chloroplasts are parietal, with one often indistinct pyrenoid. Asexual reproduction occurs by the formation of two, four or eight autospores which form inside the mother cell wall.

Distinguishing features of species include the size and shape of cells and the number and length of the bristles.

Species include:

- Franceia armata
- Franceia droescheri
