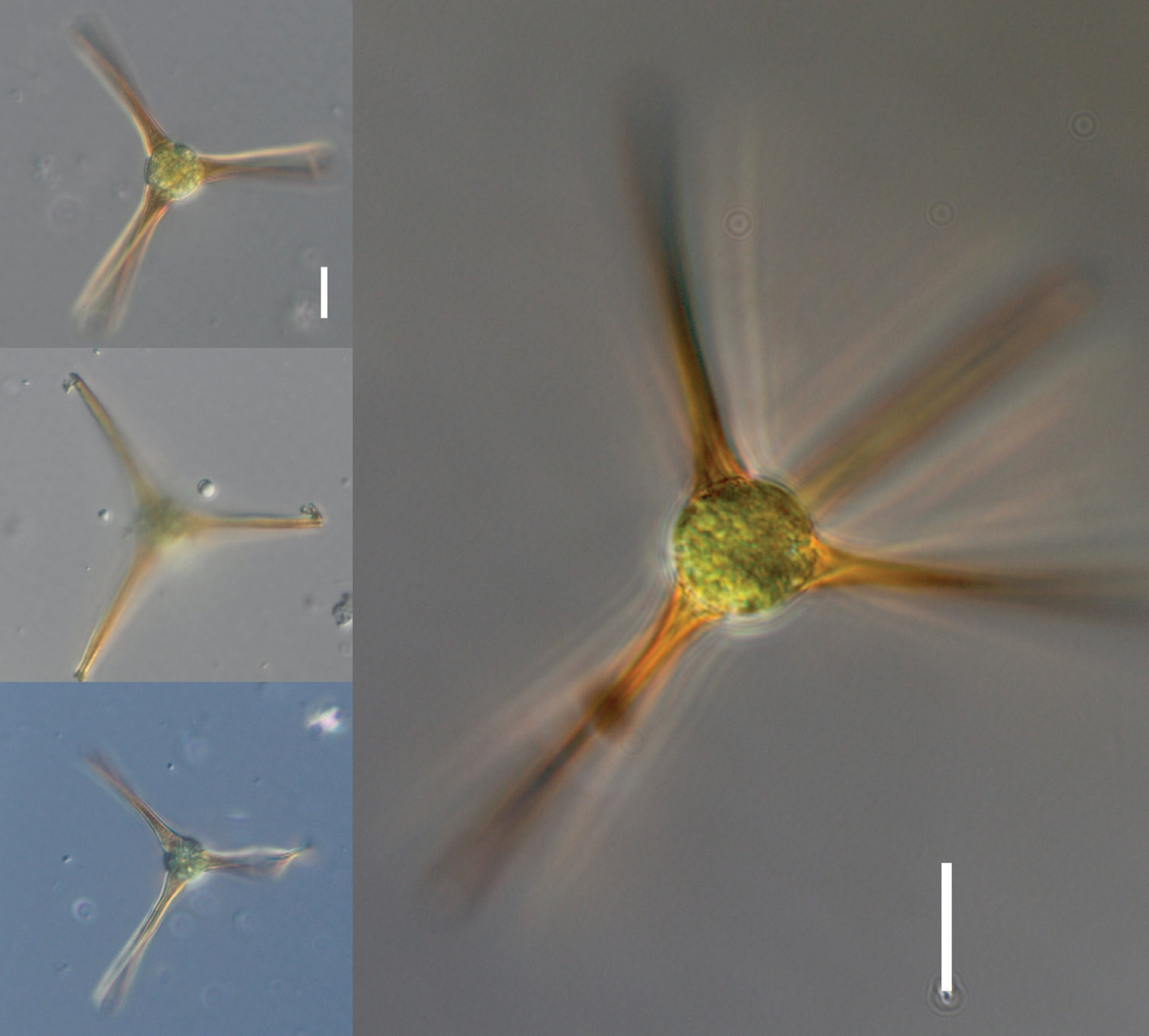
- Pachycladella cf. zatoriensis

Scientific classification
- Clade: Viridiplantae
- Division: Chlorophyta
- Class: Trebouxiophyceae
- Order: Chlorellales
- Family: Oocystaceae
- Genus: Pachycladella; P.C.Silva, 1970

Type species
- Pachycladella umbrina (G.M.Smith) P.C.Silva

Species
- Pachycladella komarekii; Pachycladella minor; Pachycladella umbrina; Pachycladella zatoriensis

= Pachycladella =

Genus of algae

Pachycladella is a genus of green algae in the family Oocystaceae. It occurs in freshwater habitats and has a cosmopolitan distribution, but is rare.

== Taxonomy ==
Pachycladella was first described by Gilbert Morgan Smith in 1924, under the name Pachycladon; the name was illegitimate as it was a junior homonym of Pachycladon, a genus in the family Brassicaceae. A replacement name, Pachycladella was coined by Paul Silva in 1970.

The type species of the genus, Pachycladella umbrina, has also been placed in the genus Treubaria, although this transfer is not agreed upon by all taxonomists.

== Description ==
Pachycladella consists of single, microscopic cells. Cells are mostly spherical to quadrangular or lobate, 3–13 μm in diameter, with four extensions (termed processes) arranged in a cruciate or tetrahedral fashion. The processes are tubular or conical, of equal length, up to 120 μm long and up to 4 μm wide at the base; the apex may be blunt-tipped or bifurcate apex. Processes are translucent to dark brown and structurally different from the cell wall. Cells are uninucleate (with one nucleus) and have one cup-shaped, parietal chloroplast with a single pyrenoid.

Asexual reproduction occurs by the formation of zoospores with two flagella. The flagellar basal bodies are arranged in a clockwise orientation. Sexual reproduction is unknown.

Species are distinguished based on morphological characteristics, such as the size of the cells and arrangement of processes. However, the species are poorly studied and thus the species boundaries are in need of revision.
