= Saturnella =

Saturnella may refer to:

- Saturnella (alga), a genus of algae in the family Oocystaceae
- Saturnella (protist), a genus of protists in the family Ammodiscidae
