= Chaetomnion =

Scientific classification
- Kingdom: Plantae
- Division: Chlorophyta
- Class: Chlorophyceae
- Order: Chaetophorales
- Family: Chaetophoraceae
- Genus: Chaetomnion; Skuja, 1937

Type species
- Chaetomnion pyriferum Skuja

Species
- Chaetomnion nakaoi; Chaetomnion pyriferum

Genus of algae

Chaetomnion is a genus of green algae in the family Chaetophoraceae. It has mainly been reported from Asia, and is epiphytic on the leaves of Potamogeton, an aquatic plant.

Chaetomnion consists of thalli forming tufts of branched filaments growing in a radial pattern, growing up to 1 mm wide. The primary filaments are prostrate, while secondary filaments are erect and branching; filaments terminate in a long, hyaline unicellular hair. Cells are short and barrel-shaped, 8–17 μm in diameter, and contain a parietal chloroplast with one or two pyrenoids. Chaetomnion reproduces asexually. It reproduces via large aplanospores, which are 35–48 μm long, borne on the ends of the secondary branches. The two species, C. nakaoi and C. pyriferum, are distinguished by the placement of their terminal hairs.
