= Dendrocystis =

Scientific classification
- Clade: Viridiplantae
- Division: Chlorophyta
- Class: Trebouxiophyceae
- Order: Chlorellales
- Family: Oocystaceae
- Genus: Dendrocystis; Iyengar
- Species: D. raoi

Binomial name
- Dendrocystis raoi Iyengar, 1962

Genus of green algae

Dendrocystis is a genus of green algae, in the family Oocystaceae. There is a single species, Dendrocystis raoi.

Dendrocystis consists of dichotomously branching colonies of cells. It has only been documented once, from a rocky stream in South India.
