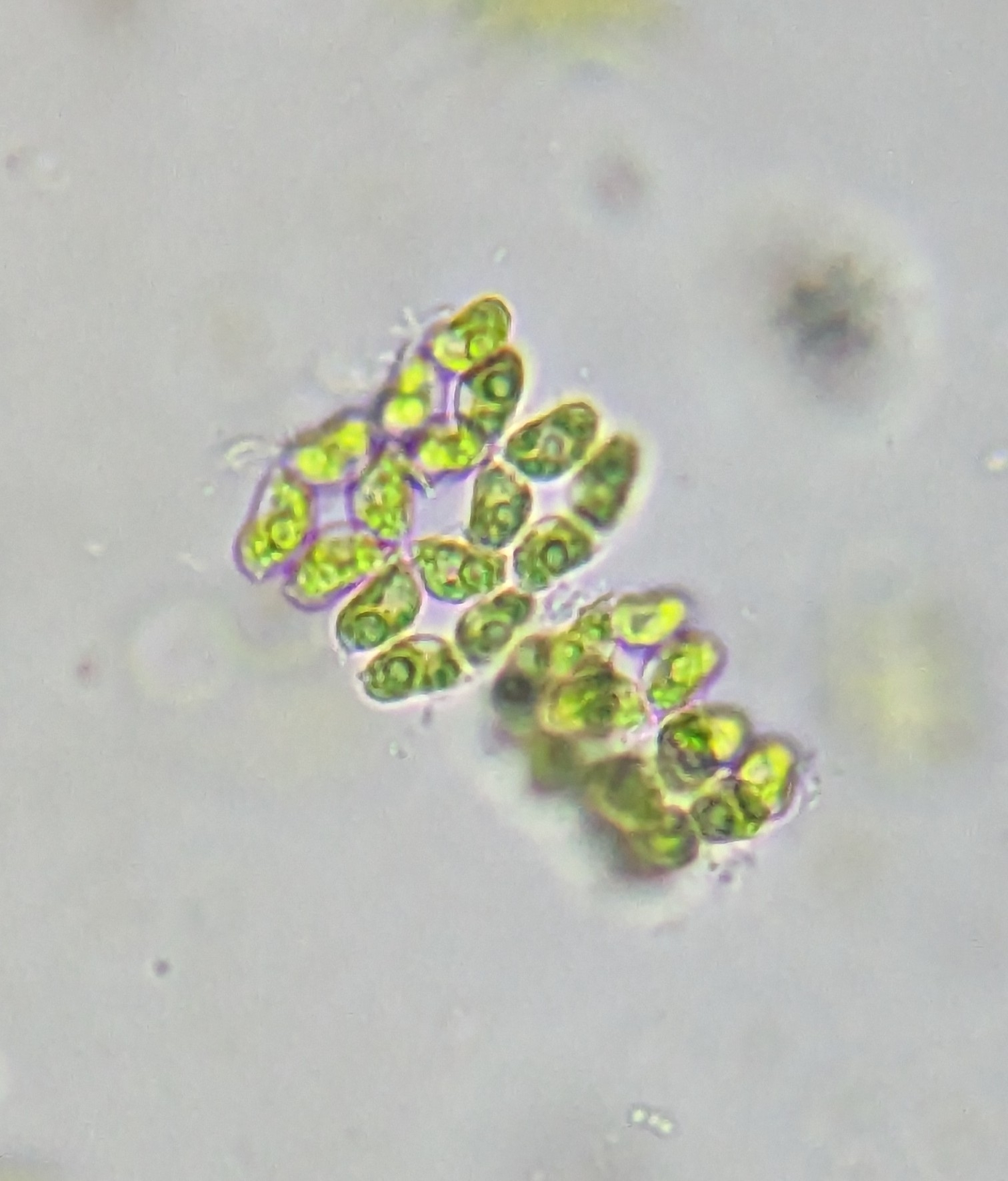
- Willea apiculata

Scientific classification
- Kingdom: Plantae
- Division: Chlorophyta
- Class: Trebouxiophyceae
- Order: Chlorellales
- Family: Oocystaceae; Bohlin, 1901

Genera
- See text

= Oocystaceae =

Family of algae

Oocystaceae is a family of green algae, in the class Trebouxiophyceae. Molecular phylogenetic studies mostly (but not always) place the family in the order Chlorellales, as sister to Chlorellaceae. The type genus is Oocystis.

Members of Oocystaceae are common microalgae in freshwater habitats, and a few occur in semi-saline.

== Description ==
Members of the family Oocystaceae consist of cells which are solitary or found in colonies of 2, 4, 8, 16, or more. Cells are typically oval to ellipsoidal, sometimes spherical, rhomboid, spindle-shaped or lemon-shaped. Cells, when colonial, may be arranged into coenobia or pseudofilaments. Cells contain multiple chloroplasts of varying morphology—usually parietal, sometimes radial or spongiform, and with or without a pyrenoid. The cell wall is multilayered, often thickened at the poles, and may be smooth, warty or covered in spines.

A uniting ultrastructural feature of all members of this family is the multiple-layered cell wall, with the cellulose fibrils in each layer organized perpendicularly to those of adjoining layers.

Reproduction occurs asexually and via the production of multiple autospores. The daughter cells often remain in the expanded mother cell wall.

== Classification ==
Traditionally, genera and species within Oocystaceae have been separated from each other based on morphology. However, microalgae typically have very few morphological features for classification, and the morphological features may have evolved more than once. Currently, molecular phylogenetics form the basis of species and genera.

Morphologically, there were three subfamilies: Eremosphaeroideae, Lagerheimioideae and Oocystoideae. Molecular data has revised this to the three current subfamilies: Eremosphaeroideae, Makinoelloideae, and Oocystoideae.

== List of genera ==
As of March 2022, AlgaeBase accepted the following genera:

- Amphikrikos Korshikov – 6 species
- Catenocystis F.Hindák – 2 species
- Cerasterias Reinsch – 2 species
- Chodatella Lemmermann – 4 species
- Chodatellopsis Korshikov – 1 species
- Chondrosphaera Skuja – 1 species
- Coenolamellus Proshkina-Lavrenko – 1 species
- Crucigeniella Lemmermann – 2 species
- Cryocystis Kol ex Komárek & Fott – 2 species
- Dactylococcus Nägeli – 2 species
- Dendrocystis Iyengar – 1 species
- Densicystis X.Liu, H.Zhu, H.Song, Q.Wang, X.Xiong, C.Wu, G.Liu & Z.Hu – 1 species
- Didymocystis Korshikov – 2 species
- Droopiella Darienko, Rad-Menéndez, C.Campbell & Pröschold – 3 species
- Ecballocystis Bohlin – 9 species
- Ecballocystopsis Iyengar – 5 species
- Ecdysichlamys G.S.West – 5 species
- Echinocoleum C.-C.Jao & K.T.Lee – 3 species
- Elongatocystis L.Krienitz & C.Bock – 1 species
- Eremosphaera De Bary – 8 species
- Ettliella F.Hindák – 1 species
- Euchlorocystis X.Liu, H.Zhu, H.Song, Q.Wang, X.Xiong, C.Wu, G.Liu & Z.Hu – 1 species
- Fotterella R.Buck – 1 species
- Franceia Lemmermann – 12 species
- Glochiococcus De Toni – 1 species
- Gloeotaenium Hansgirg – 2 species
- Gloxidium Korshikov – 1 species
- Granulocystis Hindák – 6 species
- Granulocystopsis Hindák – 6 species
- Hemichloris Tschermak-Woess & Friedmann – 1 species
- Juranyiella Hortobagyi – 1 species
- Keriochlamys Pascher – 1 species
- Kirchneriellosaccus A.K.Islam – 1 species
- Kufferathiella Molinari, Mayta & Guiry – 1 species
- Lagerheimia Chodat – 25 species
- Lagerheimiella Boedijn – 3 species
- Makinoella Okada – 1 species
- Micracantha Korshikov – 1 species
- Mycacanthococcus Hansgirg – 3 species
- Mycotetraedron Hansgirg – 1 species
- Nephrochlamys Korshikov – 6 species
- Oocystaenium Gonzalves & Mehra – 1 species
- Oocystella Lemmermann – 7 species
- Oocystidium Korshikov – 2 species
- Oocystis Nägeli ex A.Braun – 52 species
- Oocystopsis Heynig – 1 species
- Oonephris Fott – 2 species
- Pachycladella P.C.Silva – 3 species
- Palmellococcus Chodat – 3 species
- Pilidiocystis Bohlin – 2 species
- Planctonema Schmidle – 1 species
- Planctonemopsis Liu, Zhu, Liu, Hu & Liu – 1 species
- Planktosphaerella Reisigl – 1 species
- Pseudobohlina Bourrelly – 1 species
- Pseudochlorococcum P.A.Archibald – 2 species
- Pseudococcomyxa Korshikov – 5 species
- Quadricoccopsis X.Liu, H.Zhu, H.Song, B.Liu, Q.Wang, G.Liu & Z.Hu – 3 species
- Quadricoccus Fott – 5 species
- Rayssiella Edelstein & Prescott – 3 species
- Reinschiella De Toni – 1 species
- Reticulocystis X.D.Liu, G.X.Liu & Z.Y. Hu – 1 species
- Rhombocystis Komárek – 3 species
- Saturnella Mattauch & Pascher – 3 species
- Schizochlamydella Korshikov – 1 species
- Scotiella Fritsch – 9 species
- Selenoderma K.Bohlin – 3 species
- Sestosoma Hortobagyi – 1 species
- Siderocystopsis E.M.F.Swale – 4 species
- Tetrachlorella Korshikov – 5 species
- Thelesphaera Pascher – 1 species
- Trigonidiella P.C.Silva – 1 species
- Trochiscia Kützing – 33 species
- Willea Schmidle – 10 species

== Phylogeny ==
Phylogenetic studies suggest the following relationships (note the polyphyly or paraphyly of several genera, in particular the type genus Oocystis):

- - - - - - - - - - - - - - - - - - - - Oocystidium
                                      - Quadricoccopsis
                                    - Lagerheimia marssonii
                                  - Lagerheimia genevensis
                                - Spiny clade 1
                                  - Lagerheimia pro parte
                                  - Franceia
                              - - Echinocoleum elegans
                                - Densicystis
                            - Oocystis rhomboidea
                          - Granulated clade 2
                            - Quadricoccus
                            - - Amphikrikos
                              - Schizochlamydella
                              - Planctonemopsis
                        - Droopiella
                      - Oocystis parva
                    - Oocystis heteromucosa
                  - Oocystis naegelii
                - Oocystis cf. marssonii
              - Tetrachlorella alternans
            - Oocystis sp.
          - Granulated clade 1 (Granulocystis, Siderocystopsis, etc.)
        - Euchlorocystis
        - Makinoelloideae
          - Willea/Crucigeniella
          - Ecballocystis
          - Makinoella
          - Ecballocystopis
          - Reticulocystis
          - Elongatocystis
          - Oocystis nephrocytioides
        - Eremosphaera gigas
        - Neglectella
        - Oocystaenium
        - Eremosphaera viridis
      - Tetrastrum (incertae sedis)
    - - Planctonema (incertae sedis)
      - Psephonema (incertae sedis)
  - Chlorellaceae (outgroup)

The genera Tetrastrum and Planctonema are incertae sedis taxa: they are sister to the rest of Oocystaceae and may be classified as such, but do not show the characteristic ultrastructure of Oocystaceae.
