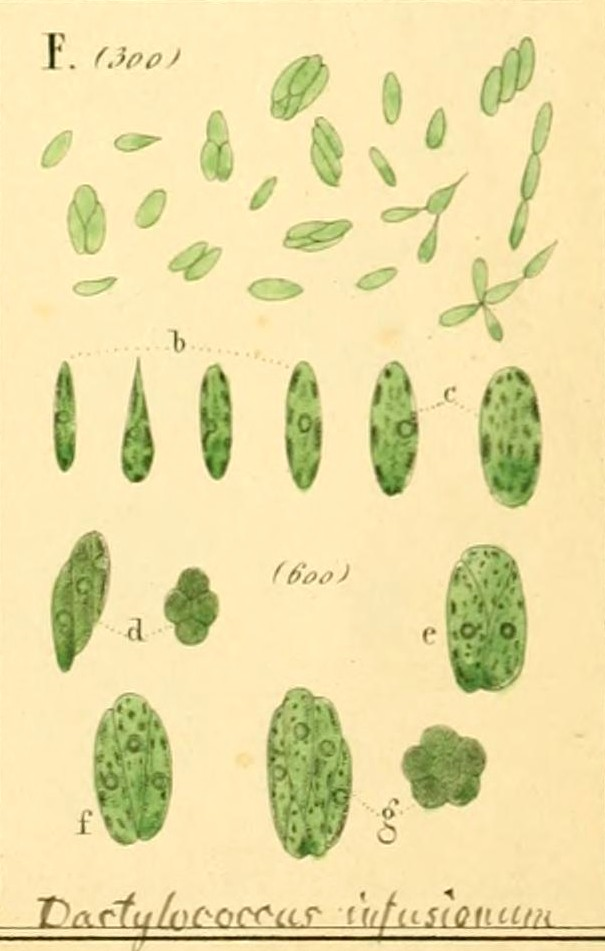
- Dactylococcus infusionum

Scientific classification
- Kingdom: Plantae
- Division: Chlorophyta
- Class: Trebouxiophyceae
- Order: Chlorellales
- Family: Oocystaceae
- Genus: Dactylococcus; Nägeli

Species
- Dactylococcus dissociatus

= Dactylococcus =

Genus of algae

Dactylococcus is a genus of green algae in the family Oocystaceae.
