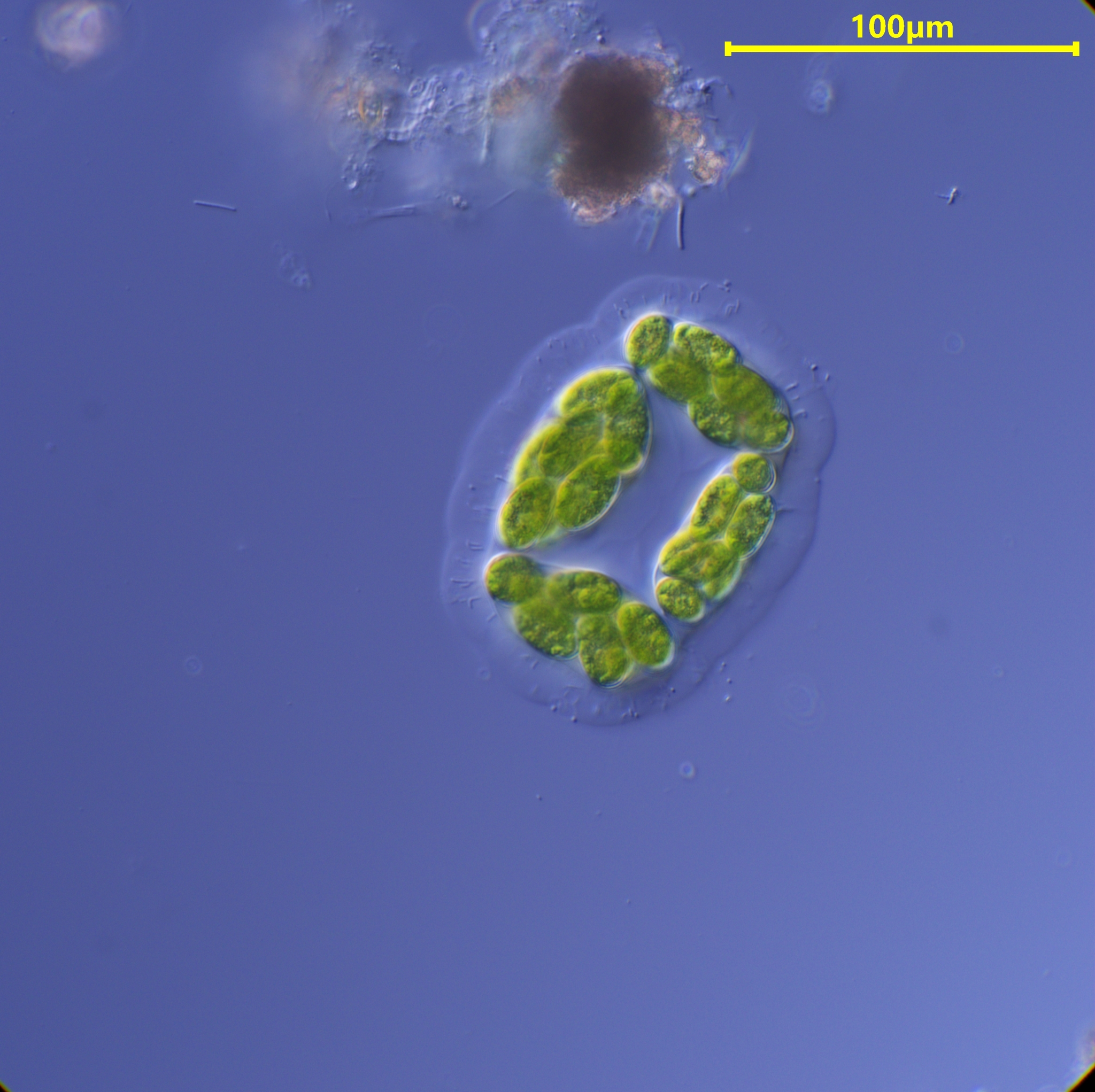
- Makinoella tosaensis

Scientific classification
- Kingdom: Plantae
- Division: Chlorophyta
- Class: Trebouxiophyceae
- Order: Chlorellales
- Family: Oocystaceae
- Genus: Makinoella; Okada

Type species
- Makinoella tosaensis Okada

Species
- Makinoella parva; Makinoella tosaensis

= Makinoella =

Genus of algae

Makinoella is a genus of green algae in the family Oocystaceae. It is a rare genus, found in freshwater plankton. It was first found in Japan, but has been discovered in a few other countries.

Makinoella consists of colonies (termed coenobia) of 4 to 16 cells arranged in a flat plane, organized into a parallelogram; the coenobia are surrounded by a mucilage envelope. Cells are ellipsoid to oval, 58–76 × 42–50 μm; the cell wall is smooth, thin, and colorless. Cells contain numerous small discoid chloroplast with no pyrenoids. Asexual reproduction occurs by the formation of autospores, which organize into the form of new coenobia but arranged perpendicularly to the original coenobium; the cells are realized through the gelatinization of the parental cell wall. Sexual reproduction or flagellated stages have not been observed in Makinoella.

Makinoella was described in 1949 and was thought to contain a single species, Makinoella tosaensis. In 2023, a second species, Makinoella parva was described. As its specific epithet suggests, the latter species has smaller cells and is organized into less complex coenobia.
