= Gustaf Lagerheim =

Swedish botanist

Nils Gustaf Lagerheim
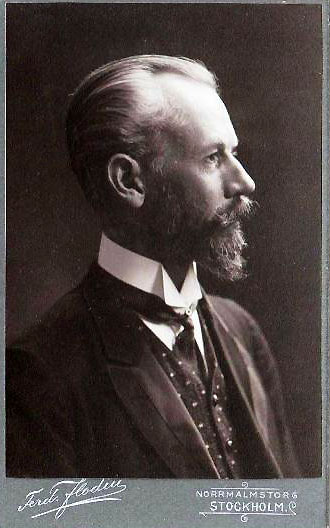
- Born: 18 October 1860; Stockholm, Sweden
- Died: 2 January 1926; Stockholm, Sweden
- Education: Upsala university
- Occupation: Botanist
- Spouse: Céline Julie Berthe Devéria

Nils Gustaf Lagerheim (1860–1926) was a Swedish botanist, mycologist, phycologist, and pteridologist. Today, he is best remembered as one of the chief architects of pollen analysis as a tool in botany, alongside his student Ernst Post.

== Career and expeditions ==
After graduating from Uppsala University in 1885 Lagerheim was appointed assistant in the botanical department of the Swedish Museum of Natural History, where he specialised in freshwater algae and rust fungi. In 1889–91 he undertook a collecting expedition to Ecuador and Bolivia sponsored by the Royal Academy of Sciences; the 12,000 specimens he brought back included 45 new orchid species and formed the nucleus of the museum's South-American herbarium. His lichen and rust collections from that trip were later studied by William Nylander and Paul Sydow, respectively, who introduced more than 70 taxa bearing the epithet lagerheimii.

With Veit Brecher Wittrock and Otto Nordstedt he edited the exsiccata series Algae aquae dulcis exsiccatae praecipue Scandinavicae quas adjectis algis marinis Chlorophyllaceis et Phycochromaceis distribuerunt Veit Wittrock, Otto Nordstedt, G. Lagerheim ('Dried freshwater algae, chiefly from Scandinavia, with additional marine green and brown algae, distributed by Veit Wittrock, Otto Nordstedt and G. Lagerheim', 1896–1903).

== Pollen analysis pioneer ==
While curator at the museum (1893–1907) Lagerheim investigated fossil pollen in peat cores from Uppland iron-age sites. In a 1902 paper he plotted percentage curves of spruce and alder pollen versus depth—an idea taken up by his student Ernst Post and now regarded as the first true pollen diagram, laying a foundation for modern Quaternary palaeoecology.

== Academic posts and legacy ==
In 1907 he became professor of botany at the newly established Royal Swedish Agricultural College in Stockholm, restructuring the curriculum to include plant pathology and mycology for agronomists. He described more than 200 algal species. The green-algal genera Lagerheimia (1895) and Lagerheimiella (1940) commemorate his contributions. At his death in 1926 the Nationalmuseum catalogue credited him with 175 publications spanning botany, mycology, phycology and palaeoecology.

The standard author abbreviation Lagerh. is used to indicate this person as the author when citing a botanical name.
