= Granulocystis =

Scientific classification
- Clade: Viridiplantae
- Division: Chlorophyta
- Class: Trebouxiophyceae
- Order: Chlorellales
- Family: Oocystaceae
- Genus: Granulocystis; Hindák, 1977

Genus of algae

Granulocystis is a genus of algae belonging to the family Oocystaceae.

Species:

- Granulocystis chlamydomonadoides Hindak
- Granulocystis echinulata (Proshkina-Lavrenko) Hindák
- Granulocystis exuviata Hindák
- Granulocystis helenae Hindák
- Granulocystis ruzickae (Reháková) Hindák
- Granulocystis verrucosa (J.V.Roll) Hindák
