= Nomia =

Nomia may refer to:

- Nomia, Laconia in Greece
- Nomia (mythology)
- Nomia, a genus of bees
