= Crucigeniella =

Scientific classification
- Kingdom: Plantae
- Division: Chlorophyta
- Class: Trebouxiophyceae
- Order: Chlorellales
- Family: Oocystaceae
- Genus: Crucigeniella; Lemmermann

Species
- Crucigeniella rectangularis

Genus of algae

Crucigeniella is a genus of green algae in the family Oocystaceae.
