= Viridiella =

Scientific classification
- Clade: Viridiplantae
- Division: Chlorophyta
- Class: Trebouxiophyceae
- Order: Watanabeales
- Family: Watanabeaceae
- Genus: Viridiella; P.Albertano, A.Pollio & R.Taddei, 1991
- Species: V. fridericiana

Binomial name
- Viridiella fridericiana P.Albertano, A.Pollio & R.Taddei

Genus of algae

Viridiella is a genus of green algae in the class Trebouxiophyceae. As of February 2022, AlgaeBase accepted only one species in the genus, Viridiella fridericiana.
