= Saturnella (alga) =

Scientific classification
- Clade: Viridiplantae
- Division: Chlorophyta
- Class: Trebouxiophyceae
- Order: Chlorellales
- Family: Oocystaceae
- Genus: Saturnella; Mattauch & Pascher, 1936

Synonyms
- Discocytis Skuja

Genus of algae

Saturnella is a genus of algae belonging to the family Oocystaceae.

Species:

- Saturnella corticola (Skuja) Fott
- Saturnella elegans Mattauch & Pascher
- Saturnella saturnus (Steinecke) Fott
