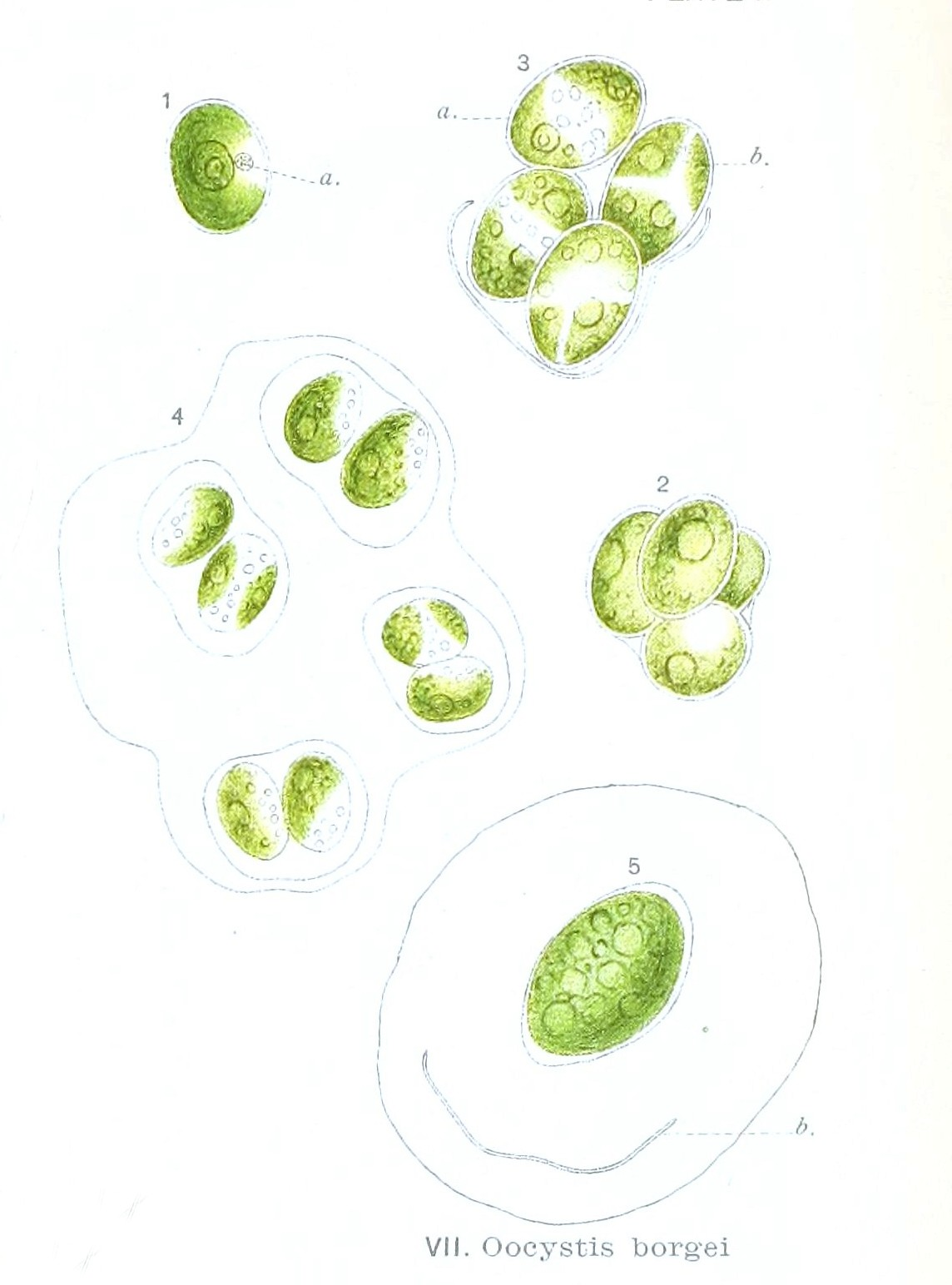
- Oocystis borgei

Scientific classification
- Kingdom: Plantae
- Division: Chlorophyta
- Class: Trebouxiophyceae
- Order: Chlorellales
- Family: Oocystaceae
- Genus: Oocystis; Nägeli ex A. Braun, 1855

Type species
- Oocystis naegelii A.Braun

Species
- O. heteromucosa; O. marssonii; O. solitaria; O. nephrocytioides; O. sp. AN 2/29-4; O. sp. Tow 6/3 P-10w; O. lacustris; O. sp. WH; O. apiculata

= Oocystis =

Genus of algae

Oocystis is a planktonic genus of mostly freshwater green algae of the family Oocystaceae. It is the type genus of its family. Oocystis is mostly found in freshwater habitats and has a cosmopolitan distribution. A few species are found in terrestrial, such as wet rocks, or in marine waters.

== Description ==
Oocystis is solitary or borne in colonies of two, four or eight surrounded in a thin mucilaginous envelope or mother cell wall. The colony is up to 77 μm in diameter and oval to ellipsoid. Individual cells may be fusiform, ellipsoidal, oval or nearly spherical, 7–46 μm long. The cell wall is smooth but may be thickened at the poles. Cells contain one to many parietal chloroplasts.

Asexual reproduction occurs by the formation of two, four or eight autospores which are released by the rupture of the parental cell wall. Sexual reproduction and flagellated stages have not been observed in this genus.

== Taxonomy ==
The taxonomy of Oocystis is difficult and in need of revision. Species of Oocystis are distinguished based on morphological features, such as the size and shape of cells, number of chloroplasts, presence or absence of pyrenoids, and the morphology of the mucilaginous envelope. Some species exhibit considerable phenotypic plasticity.

In particular, the presence and absence of pyrenoids is controversial. The type species, Oocystis naegelii, has chloroplasts without pyrenoids. Some authors, such as František Hindák, separated the pyrenoid-bearing species into a separate genus, Oocystella. However, other authors have stated that pyrenoids may be indistinct and difficult to observe, and consider the two genera synonymous.

In its current circumscription, Oocystis is paraphyletic.

== Ecology ==
Oocystis species are an important component of the biomass in freshwater habitats. As primary producers, Oocystis species are often preyed on by zooplankton, or parasitized by Chytridium fungi. On the other hand, species like Oocystis borgei have significant allelopathic effects on Microcystis aeruginosa, a species which forms harmful algal blooms.
