= Ultrastructure =

Detail hidden to optical microscopes

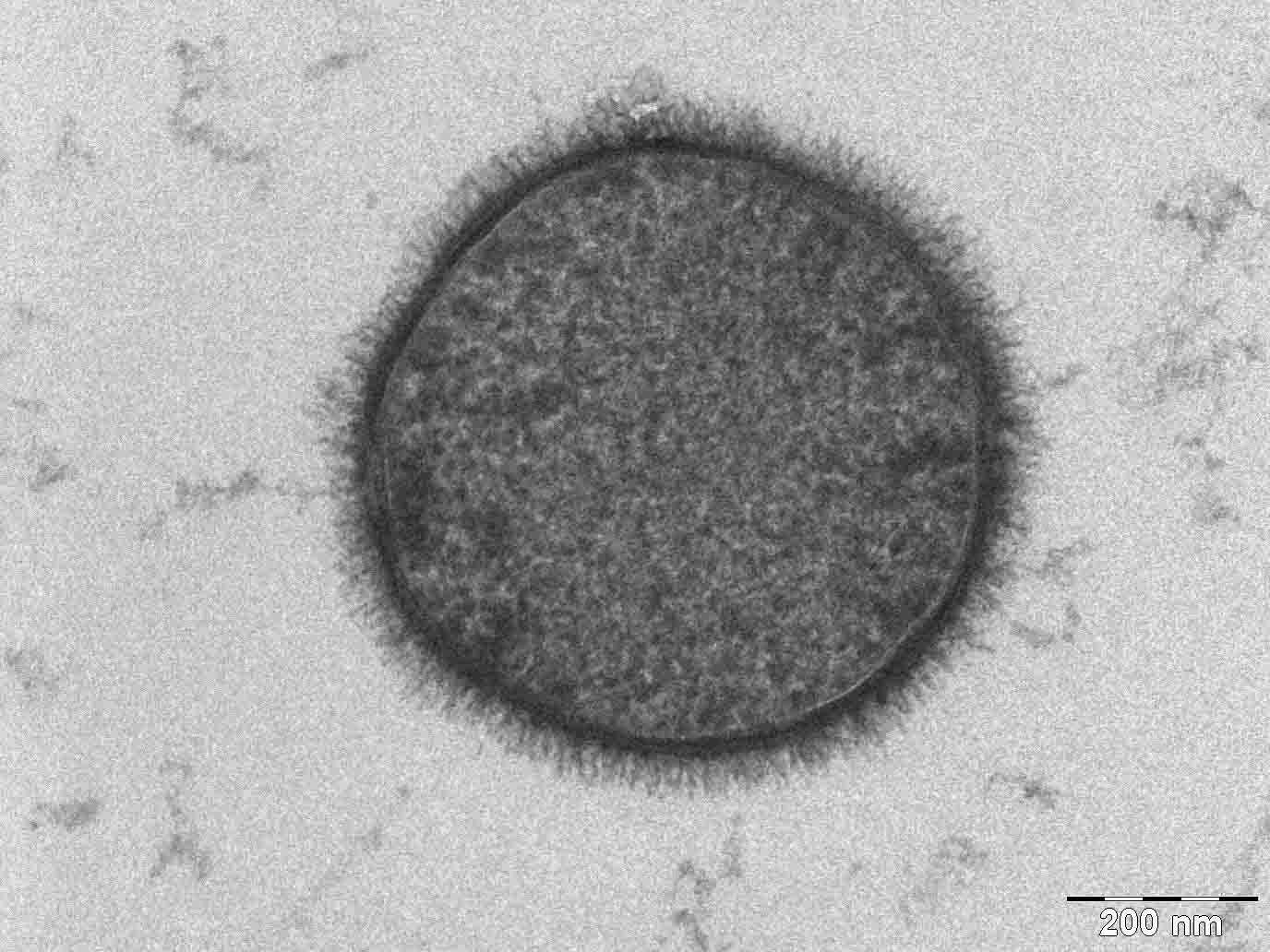
The ultrastructure of a single bacterial cell (Bacillus subtilis). The scale bar is 200 nm.

Ultrastructure (or ultra-structure) is the architecture of cells and biomaterials that is visible at higher magnifications than found on a standard optical light microscope. This traditionally meant the resolution and magnification range of a conventional transmission electron microscope (TEM) when viewing biological specimens such as cells, tissue, or organs. Ultrastructure can also be viewed with scanning electron microscopy and super-resolution microscopy, although TEM is a standard histology technique for viewing ultrastructure. Such cellular structures as organelles, which allow the cell to function properly within its specified environment, can be examined at the ultrastructural level.

Ultrastructure, along with molecular phylogeny, is a reliable phylogenetic way of classifying organisms. Features of ultrastructure are used industrially to control material properties and promote biocompatibility.

== History ==
In 1931, German engineers Max Knoll and Ernst Ruska invented the first electron microscope. With the development and invention of this microscope, the range of observable structures that were able to be explored and analyzed increased immensely, as biologists became progressively interested in the submicroscopic organization of cells. This new area of research concerned itself with substructure, also known as the ultrastructure.

== Applications ==
Many scientists use ultrastructural observations to study the following, including but not limited to:

- Human Tumors
- Chloroplasts
- Bone
- Platelets
- Sperm

== Biology ==
A common ultrastructural feature found in plant cells is the formation of calcium oxalate crystals. It has been theorized that these crystals function to store calcium within the cell until it is needed for growth or development.

Calcium oxalate crystals can also form in animals, and kidney stones are a form of these ultrastructural features. Theoretically, nanobacteria could be used to decrease the formation of calcium oxalate kidney stones.

== Engineering ==
Controlling ultrastructure has engineering uses for controlling the behavior of cells. Cells respond readily to changes in their extracellular matrix (ECM), so manufacturing materials to mimic ECM allows for increased control over the cell cycle and protein expression.

Many cells, such as plants, produce calcium oxalate crystals, and these crystals are usually considered ultrastructural components of plant cells. Calcium oxalate is a material that is used to manufacture ceramic glazes [6], and it also has biomaterial properties. For culturing cells and tissue engineering, this crystal is found in fetal bovine serum, and is an important aspect of the extracellular matrix for culturing cells.

Ultrastructure is an important factor to consider when engineering dental implants. Since these devices interface directly with bone, their incorporation to surrounding tissue is necessary to optimal device function. It has been found that applying a load to a healing dental implant allows for increased osseointegration with facial bones. Analyzing the ultrastructure surrounding an implant is useful in determining how biocompatible it is and how the body reacts to it. One study found implanting granules of a biomaterial derived from pig bone caused the human body to incorporate the material into its ultrastructure and form new bone.

Hydroxyapatite is a biomaterial used to interface medical devices directly to bone by ultrastructure. Grafts can be created along with 𝛃-tricalcium phosphate, and it has been observed that surrounding bone tissue with incorporate the new material into its extracellular matrix. Hydroxyapatite is a highly biocompatible material, and its ultrastructural features, such as crystalline orientation, can be controlled carefully to ensure optimal biocompatibility. Proper crystal fiber orientation can make introduced minerals, like hydroxyapatite, more similar to the biological materials they intend to replace. Controlling ultrastructural features makes obtaining specific material properties possible.
