= Autospore =

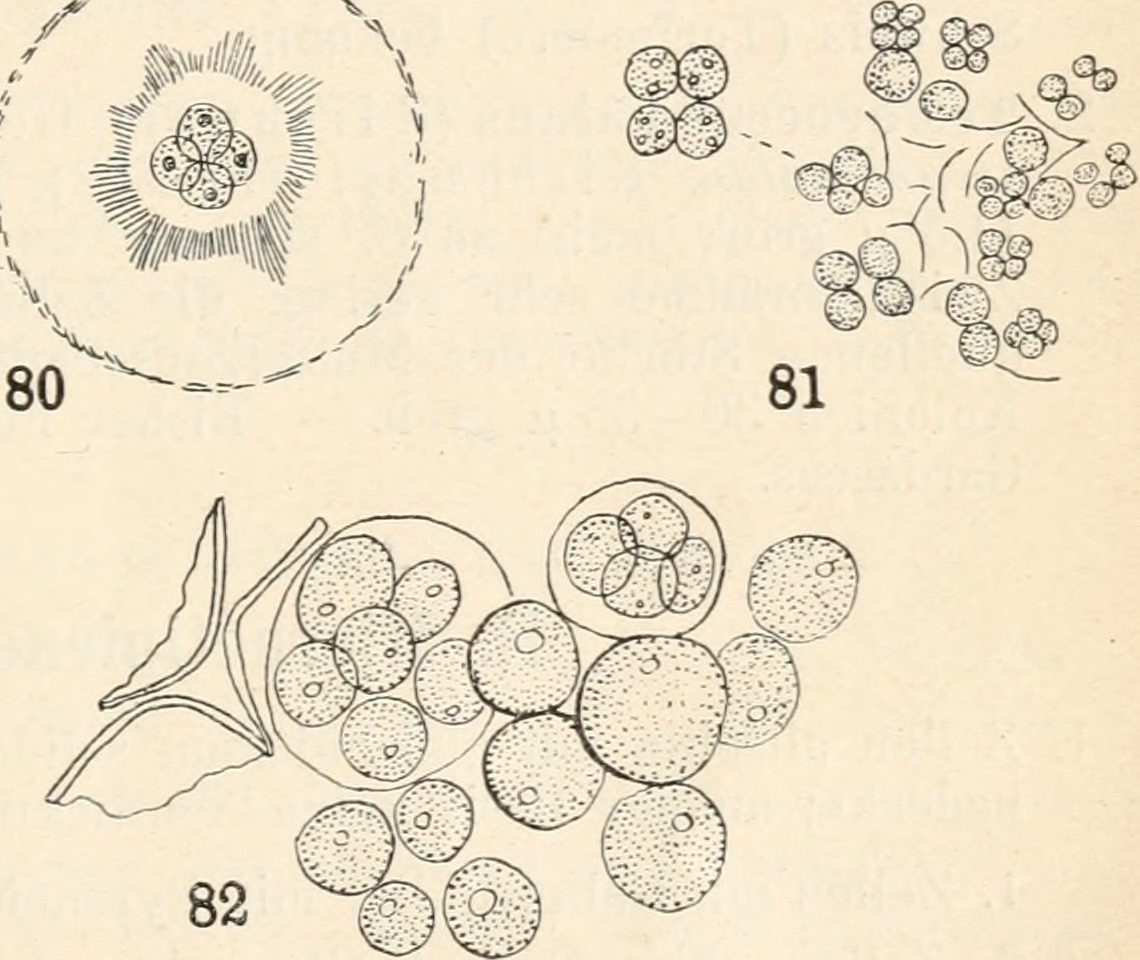
Reproduction of Radiococcus and Tetracoccus by forming 4 autospores within a single cell

Autospores are a type of spores that are produced by algae to enable asexual reproduction and spread. They are non-motile and non-flagellated aplanospores that are generated within a parent cell and have the same shape as the parent cell before their release. Autospores are also known as resting spores. Algae primarily use three different types of spores for asexual reproduction - autospores, zoospores, and aplanospores. Autospores occur in several groups of algae, including Eustigmatophyceae, Dinoflagellates, and green algae. One example of a colonial alga that produces autospores is Dichotomococcus. This alga generates two autospores per reproducing cell, and the autospores escape through a slit in the cell wall and remain attached to the mother cell. Some study on autospores and algae in general include looking into its use for biofuel, animal feed, food supplements, nutraceuticals, and pharmaceuticals.

== Autospore formation ==
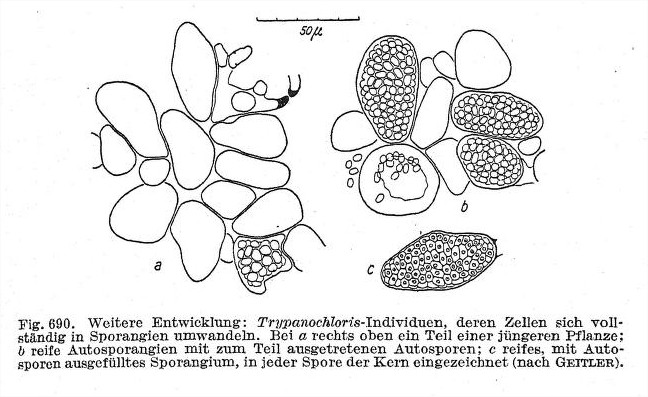
Trypanochloris can form more than 128 autospores from a single cell.

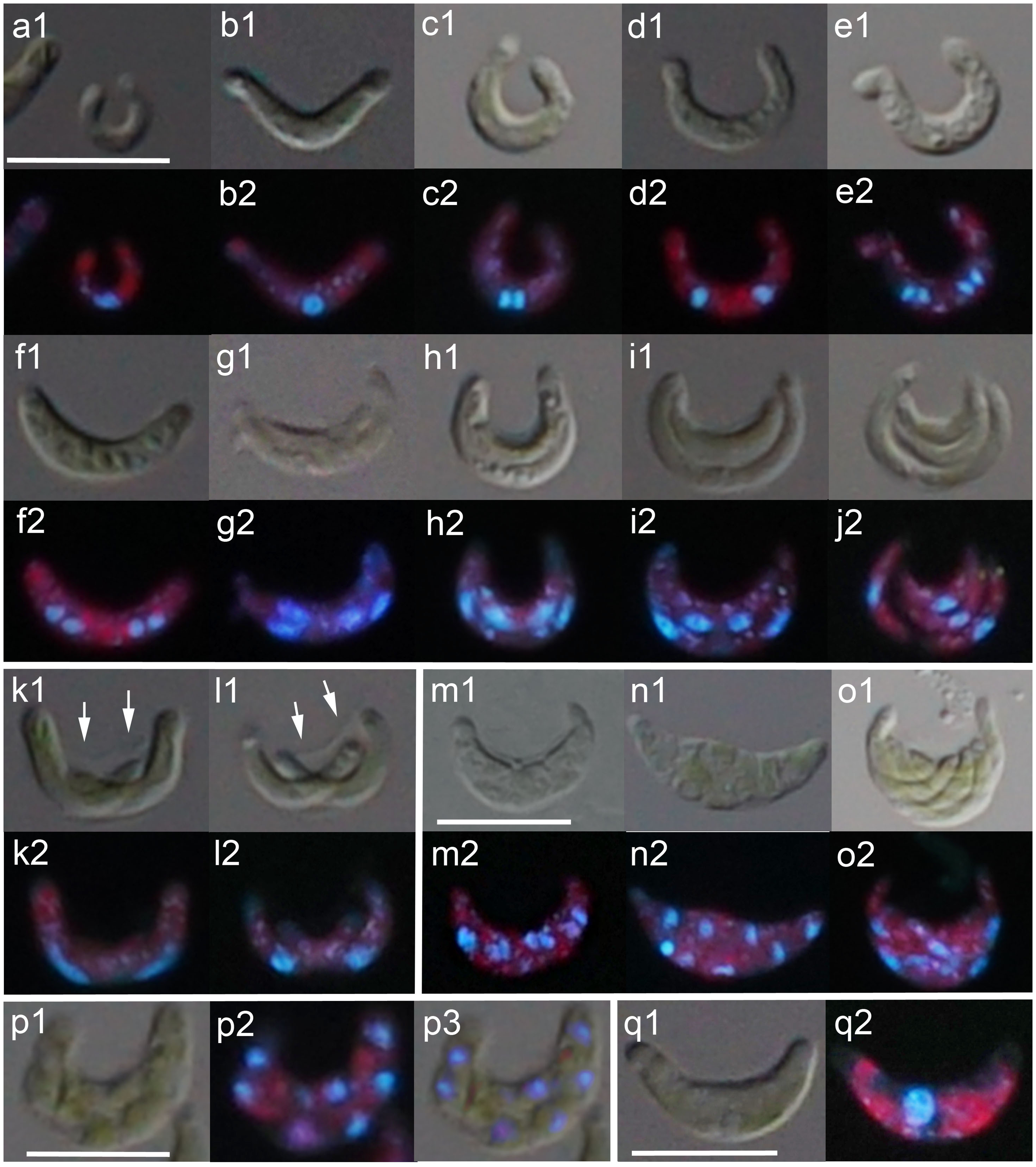
Differential interference contrast microscopy image of Pseudokirchneriella subcapitata cells dividing in two, four, and eight-autospore formation.

Autospores are the daughter cells formed by the internal division of a single cell. Autospores are formed during favorable conditions. Autospores are formed as a result of fission in the mitotic phase of cell division of green algae. Fission in the mitotic phase of cell division of green algae forms autospores. Cells may use different methods to produce different numbers of autospores or multinucleated autospores; for example, the Dictyochloropsis genus of algae can produce between 4 and 16 autospores when they reproduce. The cell can undergo a multipartition after two rounds of fission as happens in Kirchneriella lunaris. Pseudokirchneriella subcapitata follows a similar method of multiple fission after two nuclear divisions, which forms four autospores, but also has two other methods: binary fission, producing two autospores, or "two-autospore type," and multiple fission which produces eight autospores known as "eight-autospore type." Chlorella vulgaris produces between 2 and 32 autospores which burst out of the mother cell and use its debris as food in a process called autosporulation as studied and depicted by Ru in Chlorella vulgaris: a perspective on its potential for combining high biomass with high value bioproducts. The particular path a cell uses to produce autospores may vary not only by species, but also by environmental factors such as toxins or metals, such as Pseudokirchneriella subcapitata selecting between eight and two-autospore production based on concentration of potassium dichromate (K_{2}Cr_{2}O_{7}) or 3,5-dichlorophenol (3,5-DCP) as studied by Yamagishi in Cell reproductive patterns in the green alga Pseudokirchneriella subcapitata (=Selenastrum capricornutum) and their variations under exposure to the typical toxicants potassium dichromate and 3,5-DCP. There are two stages of autospore formation. There is some synthesis during the process of cell growth, then, during the cell division stage, the synthesis is rapid. Once mature, the autospores will be released through the rupturing of the cell wall. After being released from the cell's autosporangium, the autospore will begin to synthesize a new daughter cells.

== Behavior of autospores ==
Autospores are aflagellate, and thus do not move on their own, instead being directed by currents. Autospores are self-germinating, and are named for this ability: "auto" being Greek for self, and "spora" for seed. Some autospores, produced through autosporulation, feed on the remains of the parent cell immediately after release. Autospores are small copies of the parent cell, in both shape and functioning, and thus behave the same once grown, including producing more autospores.

== Other algal reproductive methods ==
Algae can reproduce asexually, sexually, and vegetatively. Vegetative methods of algal reproduction include sinple cell division, fission, fragmentation, splitting of colonial forms, hormogonia, vegetative bodies, formation of adventitious branches, tubers, and budding. Sexual methods of algal reproduction include isogamy, anisogamy, oogamy, autogamy, and hologamy. Autospores are one of three primary kinds of spores which algae use to reproduce asexually, along with zoospores and aplanospores. Algae can also asexually reproduce through less commonly known hypnospores, akinetes, heterocysts, endospores, exospores, androspores, neutral spores, carpospores, tetraspores, and palmella stage. Zoospores are flagellate and can move to seek better conditions, whereas aplanospores and autospores are aflagellate and move only by environmental effects such as current. Aplanospores and zoospores are produced endogenously, or internally. Autospores are identical copies of the parent cell and cannot develop into zoospores. They are released through the rupturing of the parent cell wall.
