= Pyrenoid =

Organelle found within the chloroplasts of algae and hornworts

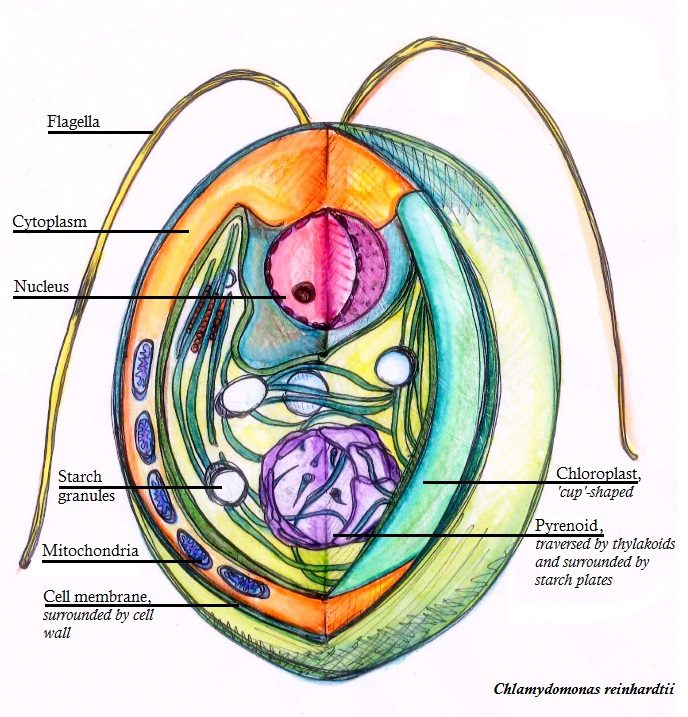
Cross section of a Chlamydomonas reinhardtii algae cell, a 3D representation

Pyrenoids are sub-cellular phase-separated micro-compartments found in chloroplasts of many algae, and in a single group of land plants, the hornworts. Pyrenoids are associated with the operation of a carbon-concentrating mechanism (CCM). Their main function is to act as centres of carbon dioxide (CO_{2}) fixation, by generating and maintaining a CO_{2}-rich environment around the photosynthetic enzyme ribulose-1,5-bisphosphate carboxylase/oxygenase (RuBisCO). Pyrenoids therefore seem to have a role analogous to that of carboxysomes in cyanobacteria.

Algae are restricted to aqueous environments, even in aquatic habitats, and this has implications for their ability to access CO_{2} for photosynthesis. CO_{2} diffuses 10,000 times slower in water than in air, and is also slow to equilibrate. The result of this is that water, as a medium, is often easily depleted of CO_{2} and is slow to gain CO_{2} from the air. Finally, CO_{2} equilibrates with bicarbonate (HCO^{−}_{3}) when dissolved in water, and does so on a pH-dependent basis. In sea water for example, the pH is such that dissolved inorganic carbon (DIC) is mainly found in the form of HCO^{−}_{3}. The net result of this is a low concentration of free CO_{2} that is barely sufficient for an algal RuBisCO to run at a quarter of its maximum velocity, and thus, CO_{2} availability may sometimes represent a major limitation of algal photosynthesis.

== Discovery ==
Pyrenoids were first described in 1803 by Vaucher (cited in Brown et al.). The term was first coined by Schmitz who also observed how algal chloroplasts formed de novo during cell division, leading Schimper to propose that chloroplasts were autonomous, and to surmise that all green plants had originated through the "unification of a colourless organism with one uniformly tinged with chlorophyll". From these pioneering observations, Mereschkowski eventually proposed, in the early 20th century, the symbiogenetic theory and the genetic independence of chloroplasts.

In the following half-century, phycologists often used the pyrenoid as a taxonomic marker, but physiologists long failed to appreciate the importance of pyrenoids in aquatic photosynthesis. The classical paradigm, which prevailed until the early 1980s, was that the pyrenoid was the site of starch synthesis. Microscopic observations were easily misleading as a starch sheath often encloses pyrenoids. The discovery of pyrenoid deficient mutants with normal starch grains in the green alga Chlamydomonas reinhardtii, as well as starchless mutants with perfectly formed pyrenoids, eventually discredited this hypothesis.

It was not before the early 1970s that the proteinaceous nature of the pyrenoid was elucidated, when pyrenoids were successfully isolated from a green alga, and showed that up to 90% of it was composed of biochemically active RuBisCO. In the following decade, more and more evidence emerged that algae were capable of accumulating intracellular pools of DIC, and converting these to CO_{2}, in concentrations far exceeding that of the surrounding medium. Badger and Price first suggested the function of the pyrenoid to be analogous to that of the carboxysome in cyanobacteria, in being associated with CCM activity. CCM activity in algal and cyanobacterial photobionts of lichen associations was also identified using gas exchange and carbon isotope discrimination and associated with the pyrenoid by Palmqvist and Badger et al. The Hornwort CCM was later characterized by Smith and Griffiths.

From there on, the pyrenoid was studied in the wider context of carbon acquisition in algae, but has yet to be given a precise molecular definition.

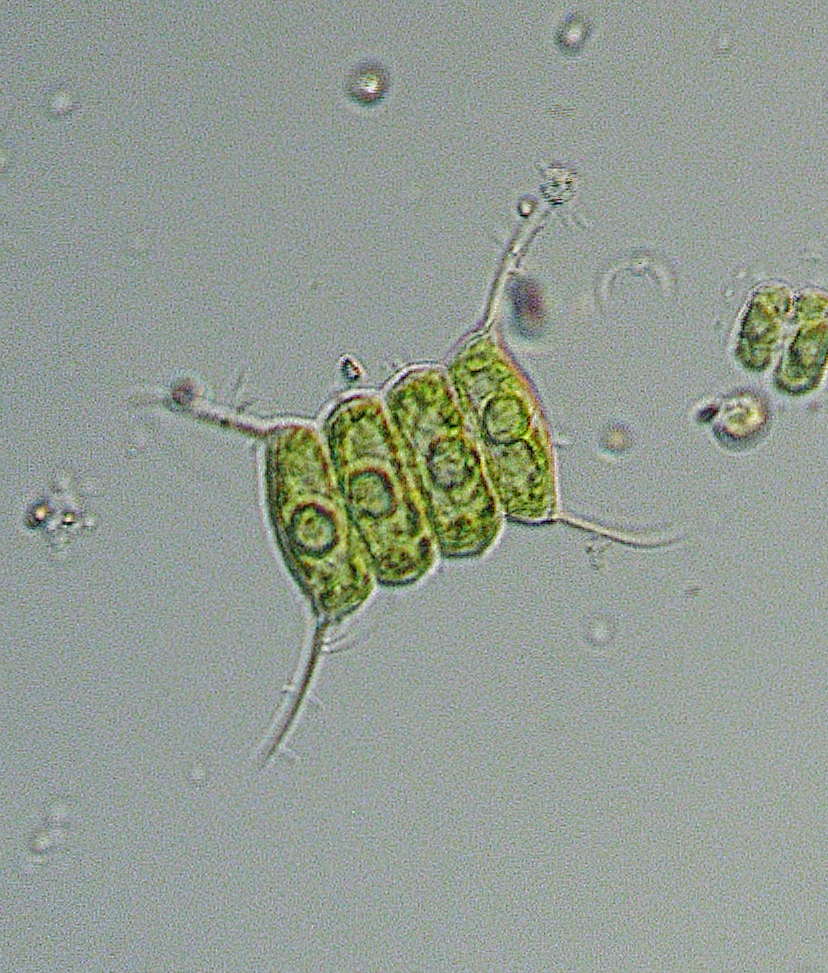
Differential interference contrast micrograph of Scenedesmus quadricauda with the pyrenoid (central four circular structures) clearly visible.

== Structure ==
=== Gross morphology and ultrastructure ===
There is substantial diversity in pyrenoid morphology and ultrastructure between algal species. The common feature of all pyrenoids is a spheroidal matrix, composed primarily of RuBisCO. In most pyrenoid-containing organisms, the pyrenoid matrix is traversed by thylakoid membranes, which are in continuity with stromal thylakoids. In the unicellular red alga Porphyridium purpureum, individual thylakoid membranes appear to traverse the pyrenoid; in the green alga Chlamydomonas reinhardtii, multiple thylakoids merge at the periphery of the pyrenoid to form larger tubules that traverse the matrix. Unlike carboxysomes, pyrenoids are not delineated by a protein shell (or membrane). A starch sheath is often formed or deposited at the periphery of pyrenoids, even when that starch is synthesised in the cytosol rather than in the chloroplast.

When examined with transmission electron microscopy, the pyrenoid matrix appears as a roughly circular electron dense granular structure within the chloroplast. Early studies suggested that RuBisCO is arranged in crystalline arrays in the pyrenoids of the diatom Achnanthes brevipes and the dinoflagellate Prorocentrum micans. However, recent work has shown that RuBisCO in the pyrenoid matrix of the green alga Chlamydomonas is not in a crystalline lattice and instead the matrix behaves as a phase-separated, liquid-like organelle.

In Porphyridium and in Chlamydomonas, there is a single highly conspicuous pyrenoid in a single chloroplast, visible using light microscopy. By contrast, in diatoms and dinoflagellates, there can be multiple pyrenoids. The Chlamydomonas pyrenoid has been observed to divide by fission during chloroplast division. In rare cases where fission did not occur, a pyrenoid appeared to form de novo. Pyrenoids partially dissolved into the chloroplast stroma during every cell division, and this pool of dissolved components may condense into a new pyrenoid in cases where one is not inherited by fission.

=== Molecular components ===
In Chlamydomonas, specifically the model alga Chlamydomonas reinhardtii:

- Mutagenic work has shown that the RuBisCO small subunit is important for pyrenoid matrix assembly, and that two solvent exposed alpha-helices of the RuBisCO small subunit are key to the process.
- Assembly of RuBisCO into a pyrenoid was shown to require the intrinsically disordered RuBisCO-binding repeat protein EPYC1, which was proposed to "link" multiple RuBisCO holoenzymes together to form the pyrenoid matrix. EPYC1 and Rubisco together were shown to be sufficient to reconstitute phase-separated droplets that show similar properties to C. reinhardtii pyrenoids in vivo, further supporting a "linker" role for EPYC1.
- SAGA1 and MITH1 are each necessary for the appearance of matrix-traversing membranes in the pyrenoid; combined they are sufficient for such membranes to appear, even when introduced into the model "higher" land plant Arabidopsis thaliana. Without those matrix-traversing membrane "tubules", there would be no way for CO_{2} to enter the pyrenoid.

The proteome of the Chlamydomonas pyrenoid has been characterized, and the localizations and protein-protein interactions of dozens of pyrenoid-associated proteins were systematically determined. Proteins localized to the pyrenoid include RuBisCO activase, nitrate reductase and nitrite reductase.

In Chlamydomonas, a high-molecular weight complex of two proteins (LCIB/LCIC) forms an additional concentric layer around the pyrenoid, outside the starch sheath, and this is currently hypothesised to act as a barrier to CO_{2}-leakage or to recapture CO_{2} that escapes from the pyrenoid.

== Role of pyrenoids in the CCM ==
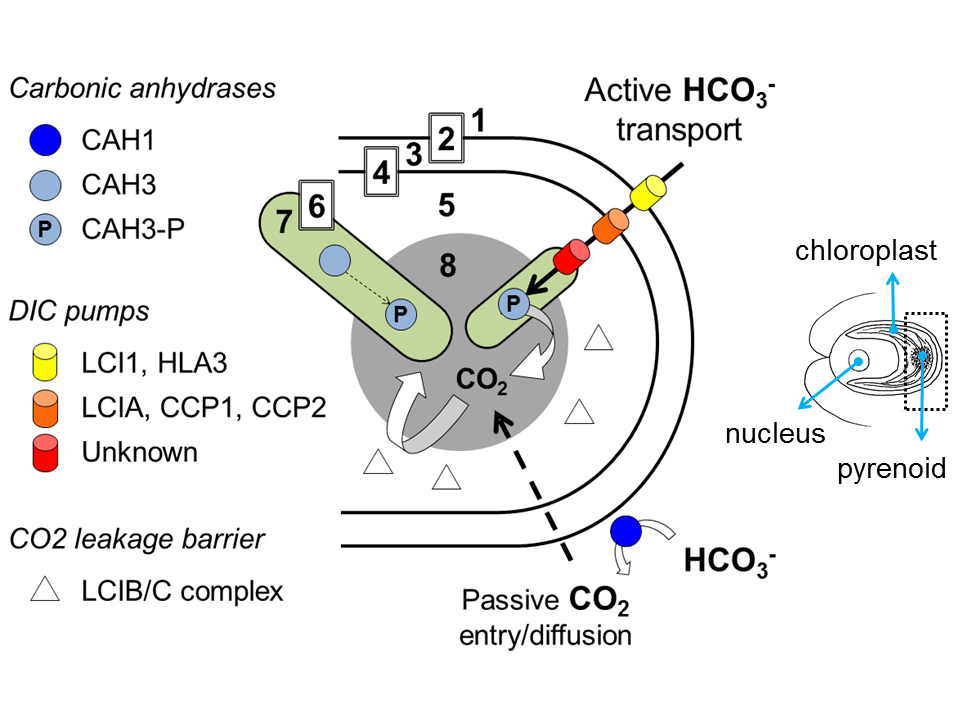
The currently hypothesised composition of the CCM found in Chlamydomonas reinhardtii. 1= Extracellular environment. 2= Plasma membrane. 3= Cytoplasm. 4= Chloroplast membrane. 5= Stroma. 6= Thylakoid membrane. 7= Thylakoid lumen. 8= Pyrenoid.

The confinement of the CO_{2}-fixing enzyme into a subcellular micro-compartment, in association with a mechanism to deliver CO_{2} to that site, is believed to enhance the efficacy of photosynthesis in an aqueous environment. Having a CCM favours carboxylation over wasteful oxygenation by RuBisCO. The molecular basis of the pyrenoid and the CCM have been characterised to some detail in the model green alga Chlamydomonas reinhardtii.

The current model of the biophysical CCM reliant upon a pyrenoid considers active transport of bicarbonate from the extracellular environment to the vicinity of RuBisCO, via transporters at the plasma membrane, the chloroplast membrane, and thylakoid membranes. Carbonic anhydrases in the periplasm and also in the cytoplasm and chloroplast stroma are thought to contribute to maintaining an intracellular pool of dissolved inorganic carbon, mainly in the form of bicarbonate. This bicarbonate is then thought to be pumped into the lumen of transpyrenoidal thylakoids, where a resident carbonic anhydrase is hypothesised to convert bicarbonate to CO_{2}, and saturate RuBisCO with carboxylating substrate. It is likely that different algal groups evolved different types of CCMs, but it is generally taken that the algal CCM is articulated around a combination of carbonic anhydrases, inorganic carbon transporters, and some compartment to package RuBisCO.

Pyrenoids are highly plastic structures and the degree of RuBisCO packaging correlates with the state of induction of the CCM. In Chlamydomonas, when the CCM is repressed, for example when cells are maintained in a CO_{2}-rich environment, the pyrenoid is small and the matrix is unstructured. In the dinoflagellate Gonyaulax, the localisation of RuBisCO to the pyrenoid is under circadian control: when cells are photosynthetically active during the day, RuBisCO assembles into multiple chloroplasts at the centre of the cells; at night, these structures disappear.

== Physiology and regulation of the CCM ==
The algal CCM is inducible, and induction of the CCM is generally the result of low CO_{2} conditions. Induction and regulation of the Chlamydomonas CCM was recently studied by transcriptomic analysis, revealing that one out of three genes are up- or down-regulated in response to changed levels of CO_{2} in the environment. Sensing of CO_{2} in Chlamydomonas involves a "master switch", which was co-discovered by two laboratories. This gene, Cia5/Ccm1, affects over 1,000 CO_{2}-responsive genes and also conditions the degree of packing of RuBisCO into the pyrenoid.

== Origin ==
The CCM is only induced during periods of low CO_{2} levels, and it was the existence of these trigger levels of CO_{2} below which CCMs are induced that led researchers to speculate on the likely timing of origin of mechanisms like the pyrenoid.

There are several hypotheses as to the origin of pyrenoids. With the rise of large terrestrial based flora following the colonisation of land by ancestors of Charophyte algae, CO_{2} levels dropped dramatically, with a concomitant increase in O_{2} atmospheric concentration. It has been suggested that this sharp fall in CO_{2} levels acted as an evolutionary driver of CCM development, and thus gave rise to pyrenoids in doing so ensuring that rate of supply of CO_{2} did not become a limiting factor for photosynthesis in the face of declining atmospheric CO_{2} levels.

However, alternative hypotheses have been proposed. Predictions of past CO_{2} levels suggest that they may have previously dropped as precipitously low as that seen during the expansion of land plants: approximately 300 MYA, during the Proterozoic Era. This being the case, there might have been a similar evolutionary pressure that resulted in the development of the pyrenoid, though in this case, a pyrenoid or pyrenoid-like structure could have developed, and have been lost as CO_{2} levels then rose, only to be gained or developed again during the period of land colonisation by plants. Evidence of multiple gains and losses of pyrenoids over relatively short geological time spans was found in hornworts.

== Diversity ==
Pyrenoids are found in algal lineages, irrespective of whether the chloroplast was inherited from a single endosymbiotic event (e.g. green and red algae, but not in glaucophytes) or multiple endosymbiotic events (diatoms, dinoflagellates, coccolithophores, cryptophytes, chlorarachniophytes, and euglenozoa). Some algal groups, however, lack pyrenoids altogether: "higher" red algae and extremophile red algae, the green alga genera Chloromonas and Mougeotiopsis, and "golden algae". Pyrenoids are usually considered to be poor taxonomic markers and may have evolved independently many times.
