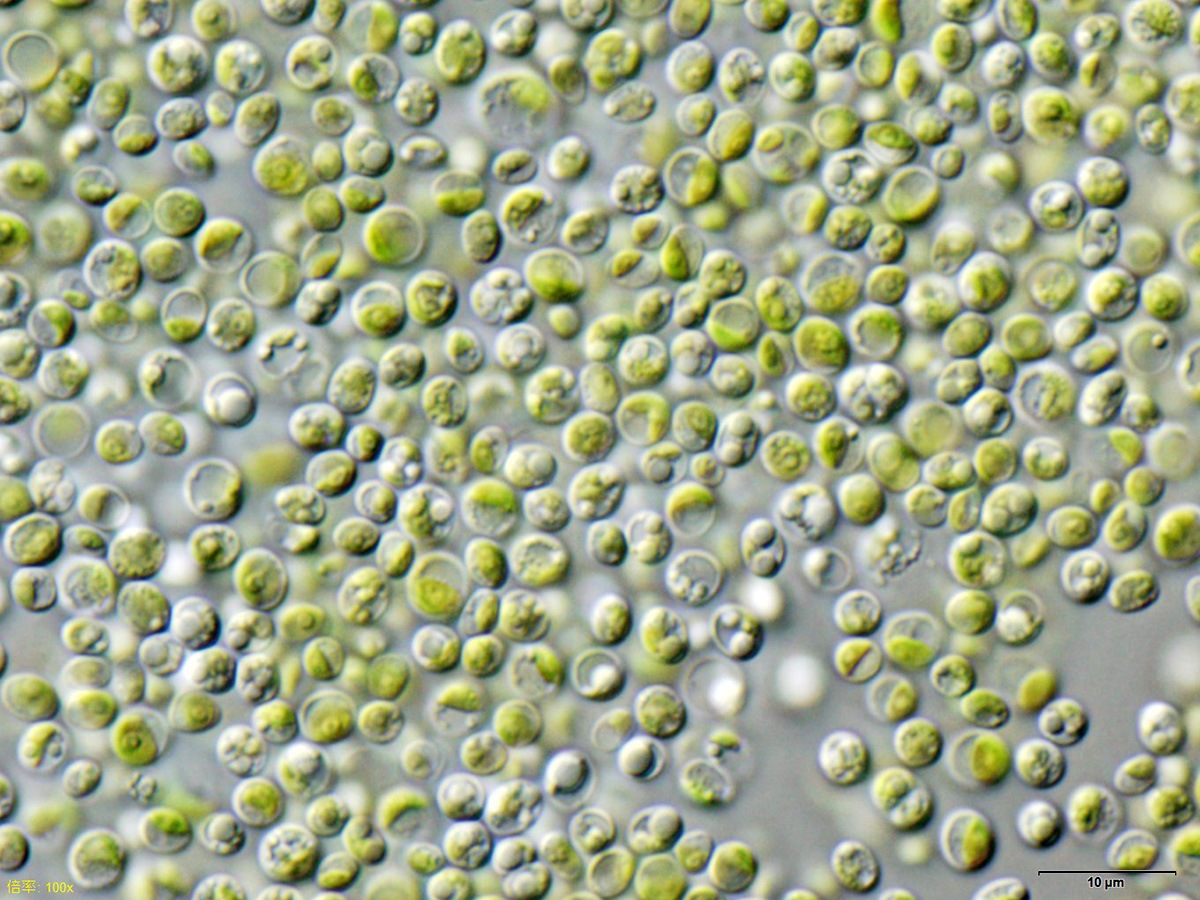
- Chlorella vulgaris

Scientific classification
- Kingdom: Plantae
- Division: Chlorophyta
- Class: Trebouxiophyceae
- Order: Chlorellales; H.C.Bold & M.J.Wynne, 1985

Families
- Chlorellaceae; Eremosphaeraceae; Leptosiraceae; Oocystaceae

= Chlorellales =

Order of algae

The Chlorellales are an order of green algae in the class Trebouxiophyceae.

The Chlorellales include mostly freshwater or terrestrial (rarely marine), coccoid algae. Molecular phylogenetic studies mostly tend to find Chlorellales to consist of two sister clades, corresponding to Chlorellaceae and Oocystaceae; however, in some studies the two are not sister to each other, making Chlorellales not monophyletic.

Genera of uncertain placement include:

- Ankistrodesmopsis
- Edaphochloris
- Picochlorum
- Uvulifera
