= Hormidium (disambiguation) =

Hormidium is a group of orchids whose various species have been transferred to Encyclia, Epidendrum, Homalopetalum, Lepanthes, and Prosthechea.

Hormidium can also refer to:

- A genus of algae, an illegitimate name whose application caused confusion, now included in the Prasiolaceae
  - Klebsormidium, a genus of filamentous charophyte green algae
- Epidendrum subg. Hormidium, a subgenus of Epidendrum

== See also ==
- Homidium or Ethidium bromide
- Horminum, a genus of flowering plants in the family Lamiaceae
