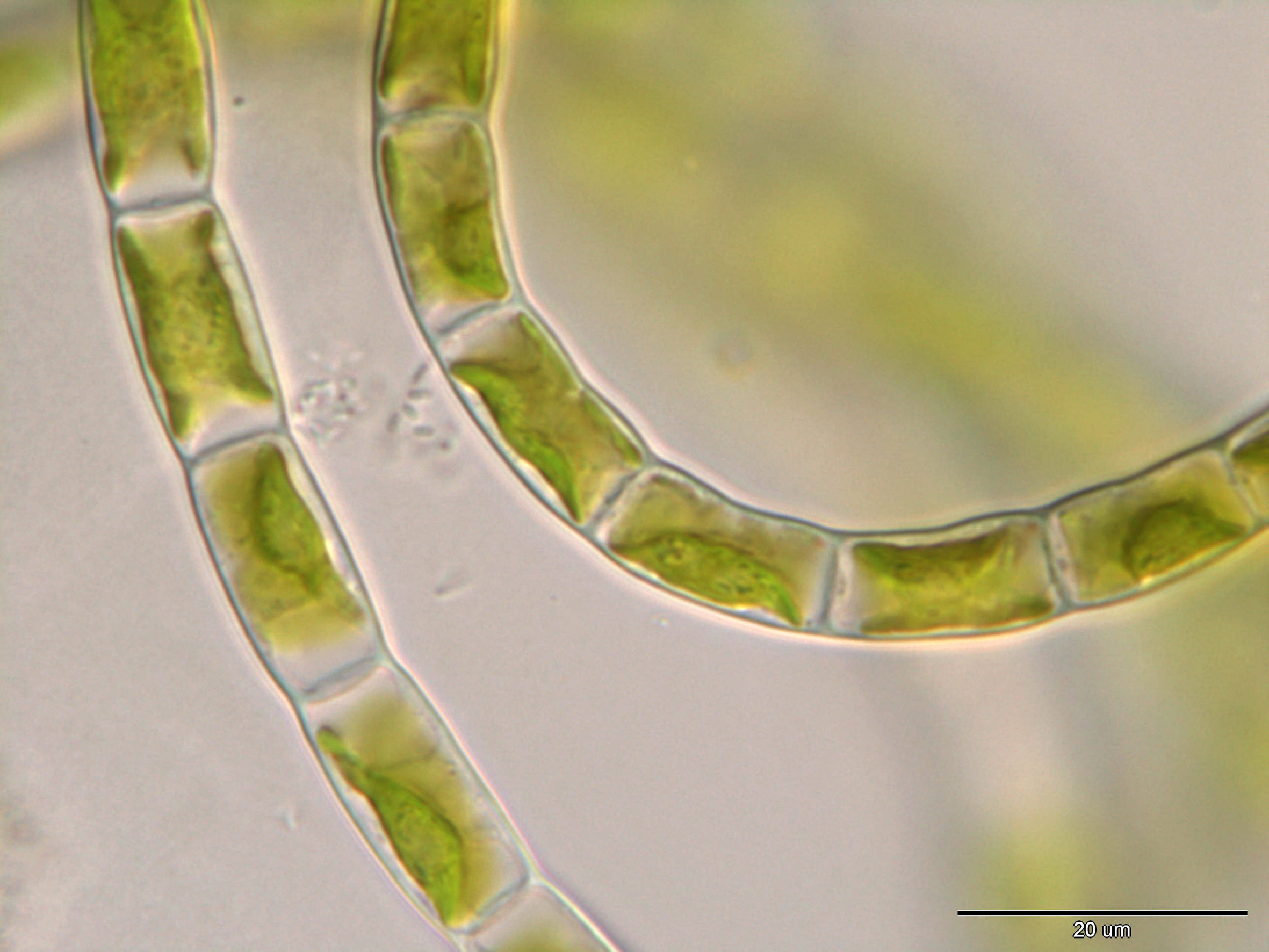
- Klebsormidium bilatum

Scientific classification
- Kingdom: Plantae
- Class: Klebsormidiophyceae
- Order: Klebsormidiales
- Family: Klebsormidiaceae; K.D.Stewart & K.R.Mattox

Genera
- Entransia Hughes 1943; Hormidiella Iyengar & Kanthamma 1940; Interfilum Chodat 1922; Klebsormidium Silva, Mattox & Blackwell 1972; Streptosarcina Mikhailyuk & Lukešová 2018

= Klebsormidiaceae =

Family of algae

The Klebsormidiaceae are a family containing five genera of charophyte green alga forming multicellular, non-branching filaments. The genus Chlorokybus was previously included as well, but this problematic and poorly known genus is now placed in a separate class Chlorokybophyceae.

Klebsormidiaceae are the sister to the Phragmoplastophyta. Their ancestor was probably a multicellular freshwater green algae, and multicellularity will be retained in all of its descendants except the Zygnematophyceae, which reverted back to unicellularity. Together with the unicellular Chlorokybophytina (Mesostigmatophyceae, Spirotaenia and Chlorokybophyceae), they comprise the Streptophyta.

The genera Koliella and Raphidonema were formerly classified as close relatives of Klebsormidium, based on similarities in cell division. However, analysis of both nuclear and chloroplast DNA shows that both of these genera belong to the class Trebouxiophyceae and are not charophytes. Interfilum (previously in Ulotrichaceae) also emerged within this group.

- Streptophyta
  - Phragmoplastophyta
  - Klebsormidiophyceae/ Klebsormidiales
    - Elakatotrichaceae
      - Closteriospira
      - Elakatothrix
    - Klebsormidiaceae
      - Entransia
      - - - Hormidiella
          - Streptosarcina
        - - Interfilum
          - Klebsormidium
