= P. crispa =

P. crispa may refer to:

- Peperomia crispa, a plant species endemic to Ecuador
- Philobrya crispa, a bivalve species in the genus Philobrya
- Pimoa crispa, a spider species in the genus Pimoa
- Prasiola crispa, an alga species in the genus Prasiola

== See also ==
- Crispa (disambiguation)
