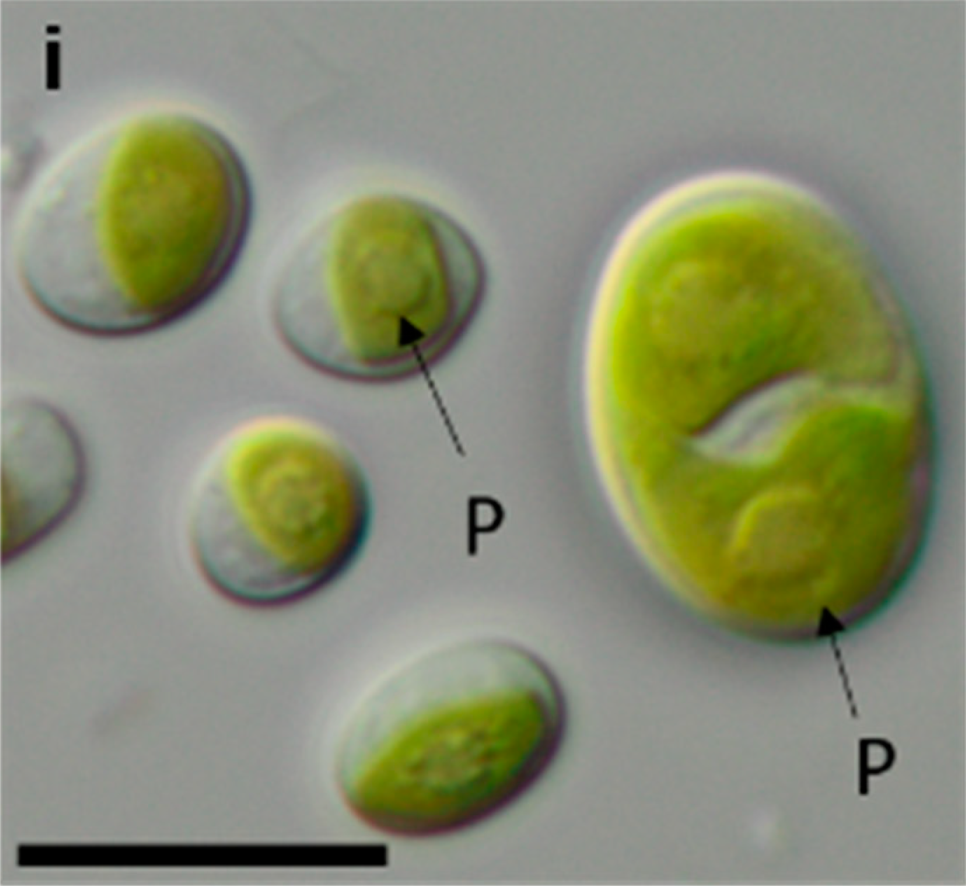

Scientific classification
- Clade: Viridiplantae
- Division: Chlorophyta
- Class: Trebouxiophyceae
- Order: Prasiolales
- Family: Koliellaceae
- Genus: Pseudochlorella
- Species: P. signiensis

Binomial name
- Pseudochlorella signiensis (Friedl & O'Kelly) Darienko & Pröschold

Synonyms
- Pabia signiensis Friedl & O'Kelly

= Pseudochlorella signiensis =

Species of algae

Pseudochlorella signiensis is a species of green algae in the family Koliellaceae. Pabia signiensis, the only species in the genus Pabia, is regarded as a synonym. Pabia was sunk into Pseudochlorella in 2016.
