= Prasiola furfuracea =

Scientific classification
- Kingdom: Plantae
- Division: Chlorophyta
- Class: Trebouxiophyceae
- Order: Prasiolales
- Family: Prasiolaceae
- Genus: Prasiola
- Species: P. furfuracea

Binomial name
- Prasiola furfuracea (Mertens ex Hornemann) Trevisan 1842

Synonyms
- Ulva furfuracea Mertens ex Hornemann 1813; Prasiola leprosa Kützing 1845

Species of seaweed

Prasiola furfuracea is a small green alga that grows terrestrially.

== Description ==
This small alga is dark green and grows to no more than 2 mm long. The frond is membranous, one cell thick, and fan shaped. It is attached by a short stipe, which may be absent, or rhizoids on some cells at the base. The cells are often arranged in lines across the blade. There are over 25 species in this genus, all very similar.

== Habitat ==
Occurs in damp places in woodland or in tufts above high water mark.

== Distribution ==
Recorded from Scotland in the Shetland Isles and Orkney Isles. In County Antrim in Ireland. Elsewhere in Europe: Norway, Sweden, Iceland, Faeroes and the Baltic Sea.
