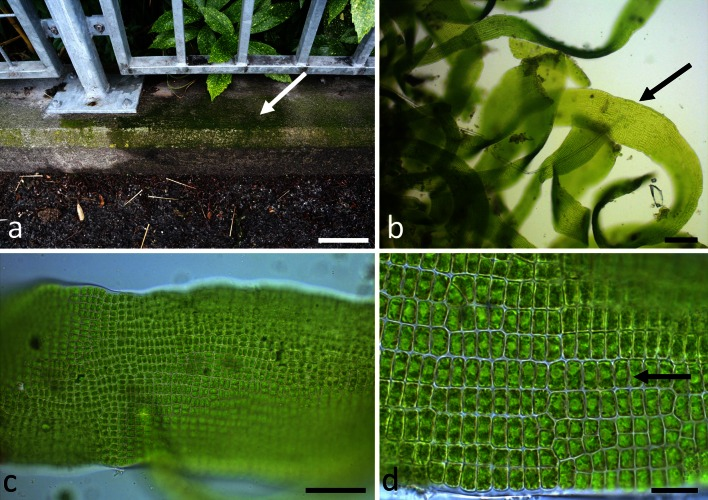

Scientific classification
- Kingdom: Plantae
- Division: Chlorophyta
- Class: Trebouxiophyceae
- Order: Prasiolales
- Family: Prasiolaceae
- Genus: Prasiola
- Species: P. calophylla

Binomial name
- Prasiola calophylla (Carmichael ex Greville) Kützing

= Prasiola calophylla =

Species of algae

Prasiola calophylla is a terrestrial green alga in the class Trebouxiophyceae. It is one of the few macroalgae species that can survive extreme temperatures. It is also known for its ability to withstand high levels of solar radiation, changing salinity, and desiccation.

== Taxonomy ==
The species was first described by Captain Carmichael in Lismore, Scotland in 1826 under the name Bangia calophylla. It was reclassified as Prasiola calophylla by Kutzing in 1845.

== Occurrence ==
P. calophylla is found in cold temperate regions of the Northern Hemisphere, typically on coasts above the high tide line in the supralittoral zone and in damp places inland, like moist soil, rocks, and trees in cold temperatures with humid climates.

It has been reported in the United Kingdom and in continental European cities like Innsbruck in Austria. It was reported in Hokkaido, Japan for the first time in 2016.

P. calophylla has also been reported in parts of Antarctica, including streams in McMurdo Sound, southern parts of Victoria Land on glacial walls, and rarely in Ross island streams. However, more recent studies using gene sequences suggest the reports from Antarctica are a different species, not P. calophylla.
