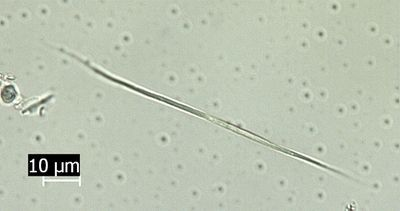
- Koliella longiseta

Scientific classification
- Kingdom: Plantae
- Division: Chlorophyta
- Class: Trebouxiophyceae
- Order: Prasiolales
- Family: Koliellaceae; Hindák

Genera
- Ekerewekia; Hortobagyiella; Koliella; Pseudochlorella; Raphidonema; Raphidonemopsis

= Koliellaceae =

Family of algae

Koliellaceae is a family of green algae in the order Prasiolales.

Koliellaceae was circumscribed by František Hindák in 1996 to include various green algae that reproduce mainly by simple cell division. Cells are solitary or found in small colonies or filaments. Cells are cylindrical to spherical, with or without a layer of mucilage. The cell wall may be smooth or covered with granulations. Cells contain a single, parietal chloroplast with or without a pyrenoid. Reproduction is typically by cell division into two equally sized cells; however, aplanospores or zoospores may be formed occasionally. Sexual reproduction is oogamous.

The taxonomy of this family is problematic because molecular phylogenetics have shown the type genus Koliella is polyphyletic. The type species of Koliella, K. spiculiformis, forms a clade that is closely related to Chlorella; meanwhile, most other species of Koliella and Raphidonema are part of a clade including Prasiola and Stichococcus. Since Hindák's circumscription, a number of genera have been added to the family Koliellaceae based on their placement in their placement in the latter clade, that differ from its original morphological definition. Examples include Pseudochlorella, which consists of single, coccoid cells, and Ekerewekia, which forms branched filaments of cells.
