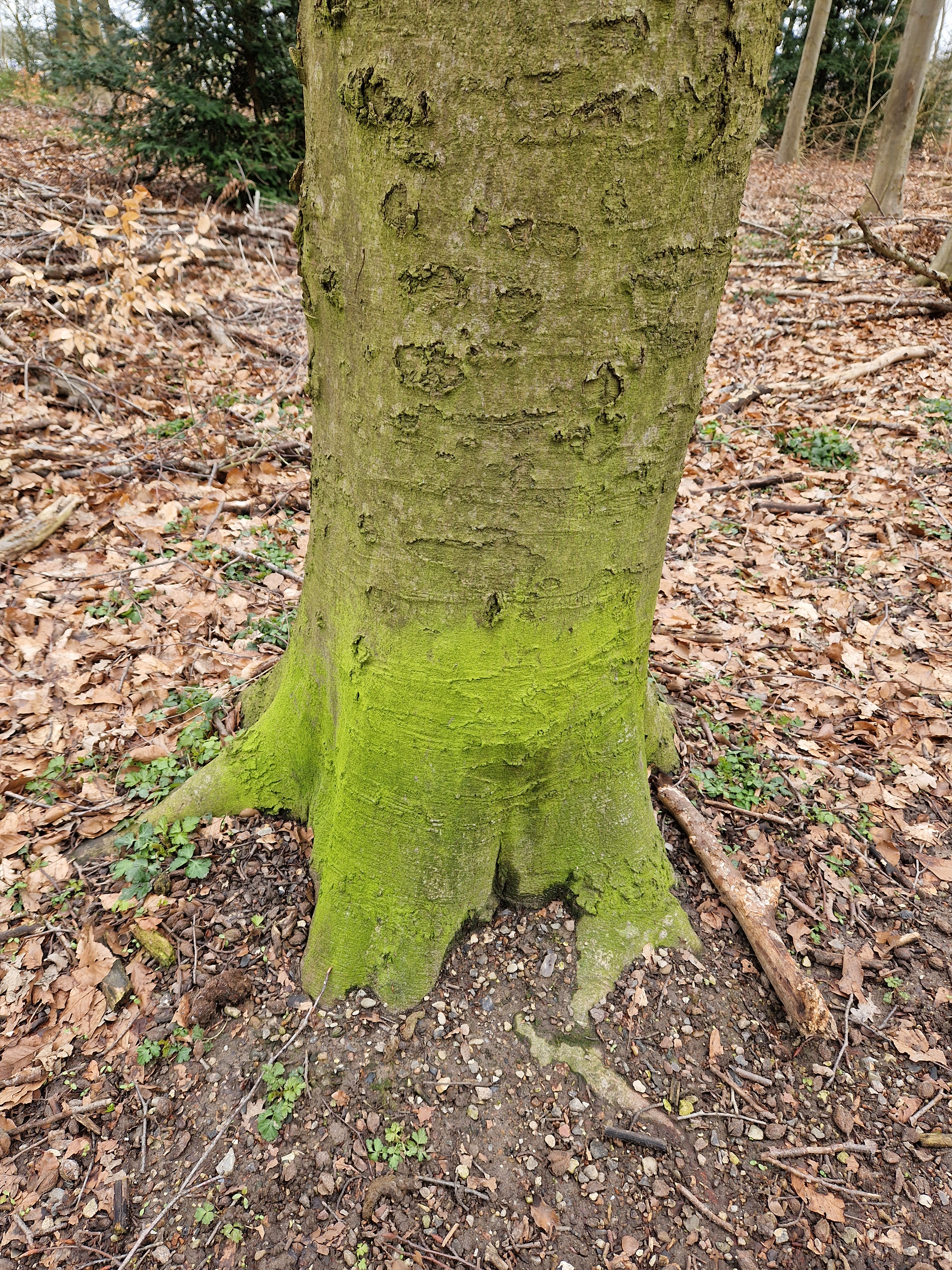
- Desmococcus growing at the base of a beech tree

Scientific classification
- Kingdom: Plantae
- Division: Chlorophyta
- Class: Trebouxiophyceae
- Order: Prasiolales
- Family: Stichococcaceae
- Genus: Desmococcus; F. Brand, 1925

Type species
- Desmococcus olivaceus (Persoon ex Acharius) J.R.Laundon

Species
- Desmococcus apatococcus; Desmococcus olivaceus; Desmococcus spinocystis

= Desmococcus (alga) =

Genus of algae

Desmococcus is a genus of green algae in the family Stichococcaceae. It is a subaerial genus of algae with a cosmopolitan distribution.

Algae in the genus Desmococcus were first named in 1777 by J.C.D. von Schreber, who thought it was a lichen and named it Lichen viridis. After being redescribed in various other genera such as Pleurococcus or Protococcus, the genus was described in 1925 by F. Brand with D. vulgaris as its type. The type species is Desmococcus olivaceus.

Molecular data show that Desmococcus is closely related to Stichococcus and related genus, a common genus of algae with rod-shaped cells. Desmococcus differs from Stichococcus and its congeners in morphology (having sarcinoid colonies or short branched filaments, and the ability to produce zoospores).

== Description ==
Desmococcus consists of cells found in cuboidal packets (sarcinoid habit) or short branched uniseriate filaments. Cells are uninucleate with a single, trough-shaped chloroplast and a pyrenoid; however, the pyrenoid is naked and difficult to see. Asexual reproduction occurs by the production of aplanospores 4-flagellate zoospores which are produced in large, spherical sporangia; the sporangia have a punctate, verrucose, or smooth outer cell wall. Sexual reproduction has not been observed in this genus.

== Habitat ==
Desmococcus is very common and has been described as "the most common subaerial alga world-wide". It typically grows on damp, soil-free surfaces such as tree trunks, wooden poles, and other surfaces where lichens are uncommon.
