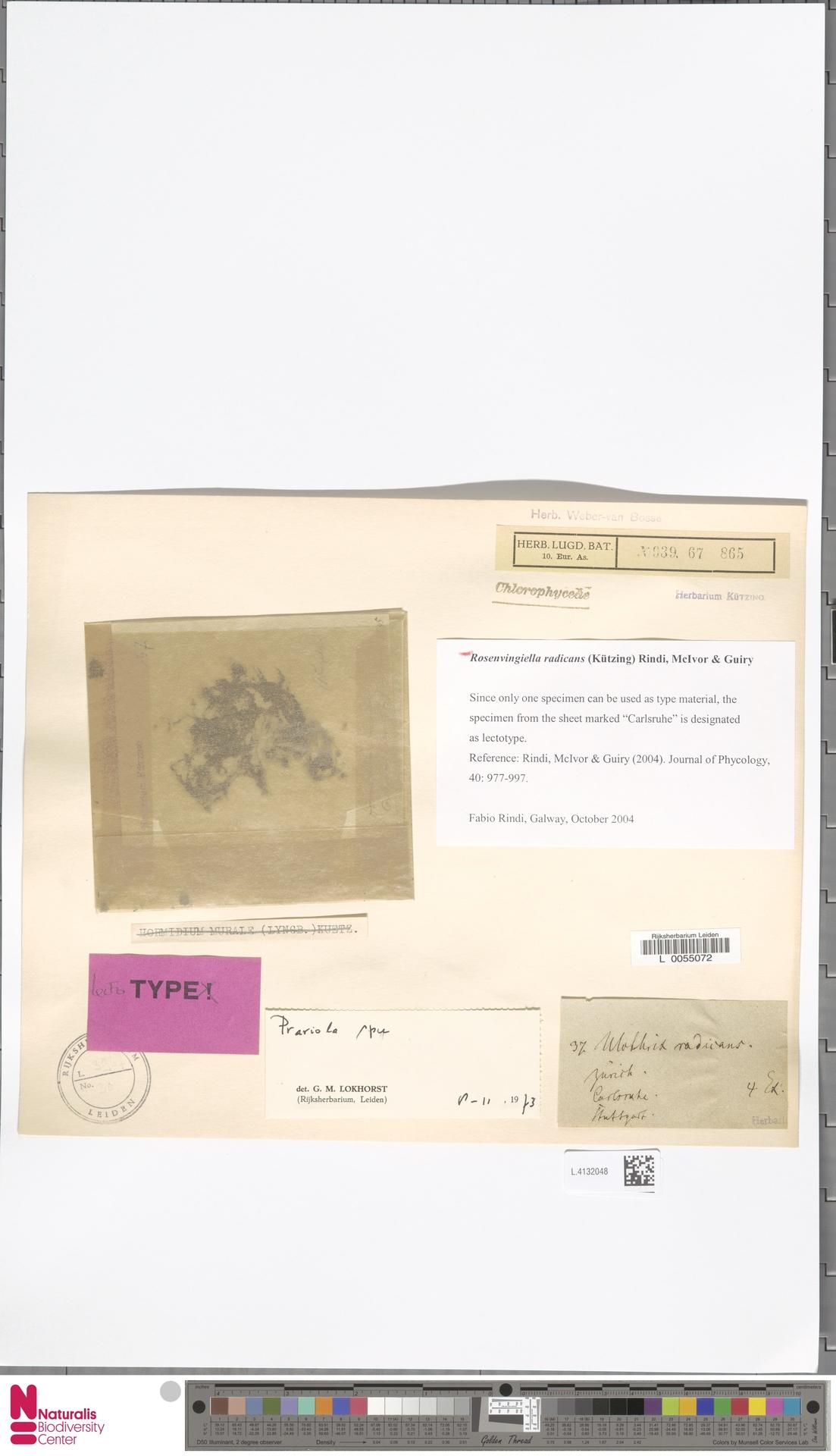
- Type of Ulothrix radicans Kütz. now known as Rosenvingiella radicans

Scientific classification
- Kingdom: Plantae
- Division: Chlorophyta
- Class: Trebouxiophyceae
- Order: Prasiolales
- Family: Prasiolaceae
- Genus: Rosenvingiella; P.C.Silva

Type species
- Rosenvingiella polyrhiza (Rosenvinge) P.C.Silva

Species
- See below

= Rosenvingiella =

Genus of algae

Rosenvingiella is a genus of green algae in the family Prasiolaceae. Members of this genus are found in marine (particularly intertidal) or terrestrial habitats.

The genus was first circumscribed by Janus Lauritz Andreas Kolderup Rosenvinge, generally cited as Lauritz Kolderup Rosenvinge (1858–1939), who was a Danish botanist and phycologist. Rosenvinge named the genus Gayella, but this was junior homonym of Gayella Pierre (a flowering plant in the family Sapotaceae). Therefore, the genus was renamed to Rosenvingiella by Paul Claude Silva in 1957, honoring its original author.

== Description ==
Rosenvingiella consists of uniseriate (one cell wide) filaments of cells, later becoming multiseriate and pseudoparenchymatous. The filaments are attached to a substrate via a unicellular rhizoid, either found singly or in pairs. Cells are shorter than wide, containing a single stellate chloroplast with a single central pyrenoid. Asexual reproduction occurs via the formation of nonmotile spores, while sexual reproduction is oogamous and involves oogonia and male gametes with two flagella.

Rosenvingiella is similar in morphology to Prasiola, and has often been considered a synonym of the latter. Molecular phylogenetic analyses have shown the two genera to be separate: they can be distinguished by morphological characters of the gametangia and rhizoids. The genus Rosenvingiellopsis was also separated from Rosenvingiella based on molecular data.

== Species ==
As accepted by WoRMS;

- Rosenvingiella discifera (Kjellman) Heesch, M.Pazoutová & Rindi, 2016
- Rosenvingiella polyrhiza (Rosenvinge) P.C.Silva, 1957
- Rosenvingiella radicans (Kützing) Rindi, L.McIvor & Guiry, 2004
- Rosenvingiella simplex Vinogradova, 1984
- Rosenvingiella tasmanica M.B.J.Moniz, Rindi & Guiry, 2012

Former species;

- R. australis S.Heesch & W.A.Nelson, 2012 accepted as Rosenvingiella tasmanica M.B.J.Moniz, Rindi & Guiry, 2012
- R. constricta (Setchell & N.L.Gardner) P.C.Silva, 1957 accepted as Rosenvingiellopsis constricta (Setchell & N.L.Gardner) Heesch, M.Pazoutová & Rindi, 2016
