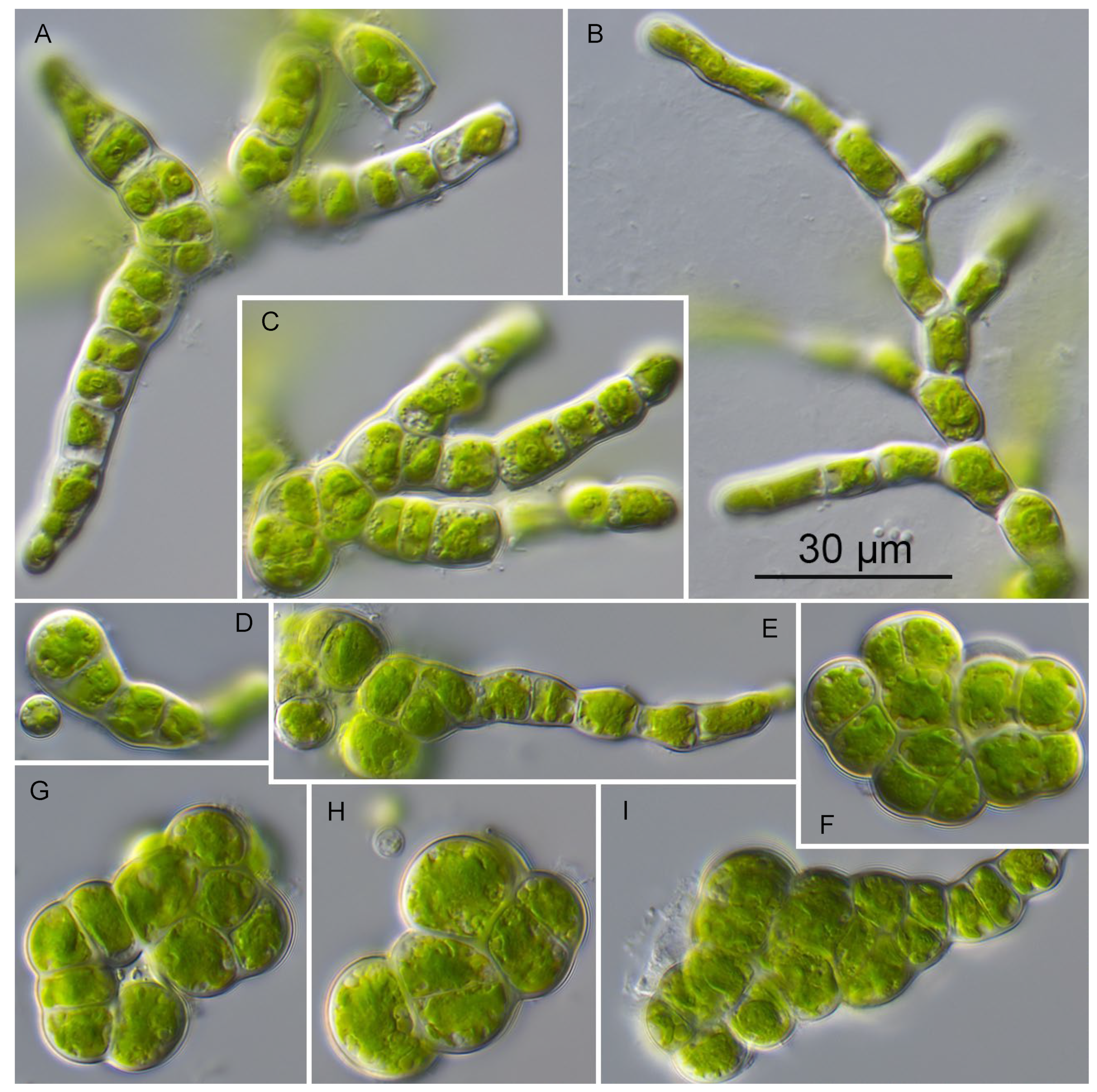
- Prasiolopsis ramosa

Scientific classification
- Kingdom: Plantae
- Division: Chlorophyta
- Class: Trebouxiophyceae
- Order: Prasiolales
- Family: Prasiolaceae
- Genus: Prasiolopsis; Vischer

Species
- Prasiolopsis ramosa

= Prasiolopsis =

Genus of algae

Prasiolopsis is a genus of green algae in the family Prasiolaceae.
