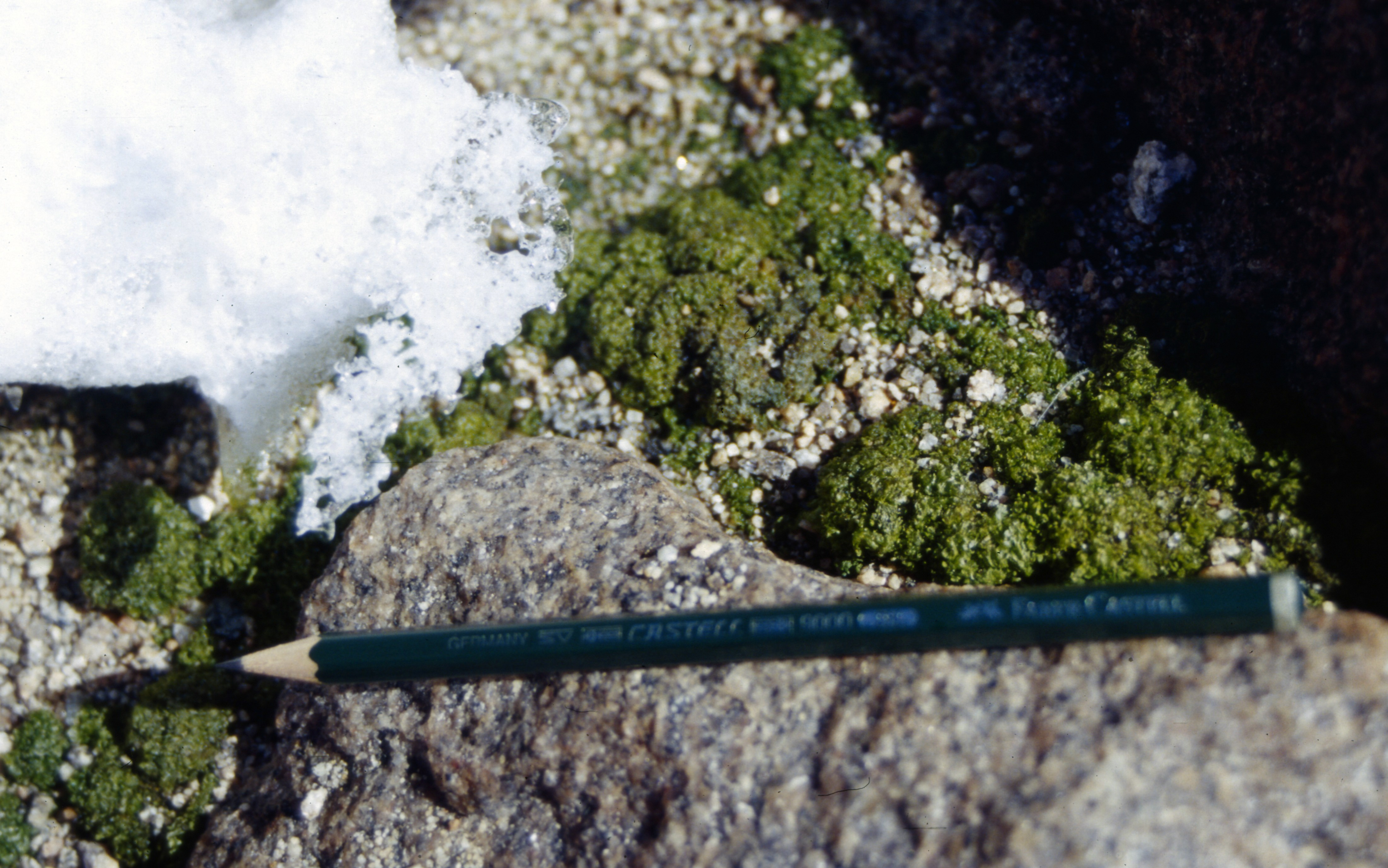
- Prasiola crispa found in central Queen Maud Land, Antarctica

Scientific classification
- Kingdom: Plantae
- Division: Chlorophyta
- Class: Trebouxiophyceae
- Order: Prasiolales
- Family: Prasiolaceae
- Genus: Prasiola
- Species: P. crispa

Binomial name
- Prasiola crispa (Lightfoot) Kützing 1843

Synonyms
- List: Ulva crispaLightfoot 1777; Ulva terrestris Roth 1797; Schizogonium crispatum Kützing 1843; Schizogonium parietinum Kützing 1843; Hormidium parietinum (Kützing) Kützing 1845; Prasiola rothii Kützing 1845; Prasiola orbicularis Kützing 1845; Prasiola antarctica Kützing 1849; Schizogonium laetevirens var. crispatum (Kützing) Kützing 1849; Prasiola rothii var. falklandica Kützing 1849; Prasiola falklandica (Kützing) Kützing 1855; Prasiola georgica Reinsch 1890; Prasiola crispa subsp. terrestris Børgesen 1902; Prasiola crispa var. aspera West & G.S.West 1911; Prasiola crispa subsp. antarctica (Kützing) Knebel 1935; Mastodia antarctica (Kützing) C.W.Dodge 1948

= Prasiola crispa =

Species of seaweed

Prasiola crispa is a small terrestrial green alga. It has been recorded world-wide mostly from cold-temperate to polar regions.

== Taxonomy ==
The species, first described as Ulva crispa Lightfoot, is the type of the genus Prasiola. A lectotype was nominated for the species, the type location of which was provided in accompanying notation as walls that faced north and were favoured as urinals.

The specific epithet is said to translate as "crisped", a reference to the irregular convolutions of the species.

== Description ==
This is a small green alga growing to about 6 cm long. The frond is round in shape, flattened. Generally one cell thick, the cells are arranged in rows or in groups of four.

It seems to be an important food source for Antarctic collembolans.

The species has been used a model for the study of the effects of high intensities of UV radiation on photosynthesis.

== Reproduction ==
Reproduction is by akinetes and aplanospores.

== Distribution ==
Recorded world-wide mostly from cold-temperate to polar regions, e.g. from Iceland, the British Isles including the Isle of Man, New Zealand, Japan and the Pacific shores of North America. In Antarctica, the species lives near penguin colonies.

== Conservation status ==
In Iceland, it is red listed as a vulnerable species (VU).
