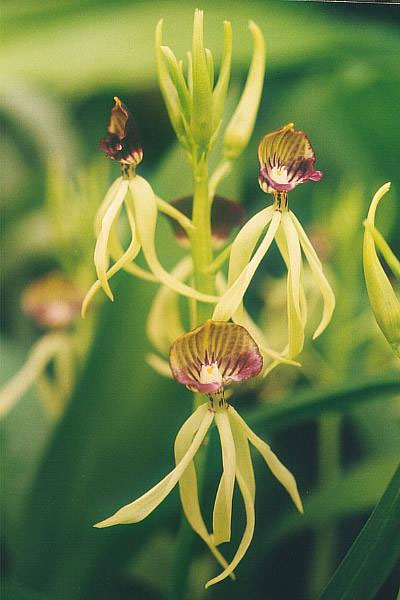
- Prosthechea cochleata

Scientific classification
- Kingdom: Plantae
- Clade: Embryophytes
- Clade: Tracheophytes
- Clade: Spermatophytes
- Clade: Angiosperms
- Clade: Monocots
- Order: Asparagales
- Family: Orchidaceae
- Subfamily: Epidendroideae
- Tribe: Epidendreae
- Subtribe: Laeliinae
- Genus: Prosthechea; Knowles & Westc., 1838

Type species
- Prosthechea glauca Knowles & Westc. - Floral Cabinet 2: 111-112. 1838.

Species
- About 100 species - See text

Synonyms
- Anacheilium Hoffmanns.; Epicladium Small; Epithecia Knowles & Westc., illegitimate superfluous name; Euchile (Dressler & G.E.Pollard) Withner; Hormidium Lindl. ex Heynh.; Panarica Withner & P.A.Harding; Pollardia Withner & P.A.Harding; Pseudencyclia Chiron & V.P.Castro

= Prosthechea =

Genus of orchids

Prosthechea is a genus of flowering plants in the orchid family (Orchidaceae). The name is derived from the Greek word prostheke (appendix), referring to the appendage on the back of the column. Appendage orchid is a common name for this genus. Prosthechea is abbreviated Psh. in the horticultural trade.

== Morphology ==
The roots of all Prosthechea species possess a velamen (a thick sponge-like covering) differentiated into epivelamen and endovelamen. Flavonoid crystals were observed in both the roots and leaves. The erect stems form flattened or thickened pseudobulbs. There are 1 to 3 terminal, sessile leaves. The leathery blade is ovate to lanceolate. (Euchile leaves are softer and thinner than other Prosthechea leaves.)

The flowers form an apical, paniculate raceme with a spathe at the base of the inflorescence. There is a great variety in the flowers of this genus. They may be attached to the stem by a peduncle or they may be sessile. They can flower on the raceme at the same time or successively. They can be resupinate or non-resupinate (as in Prosthechea cochleata). Prosthechea flowers are unique among the Laeliinae in producing fluorescent flavenoid crystals when preserved in ethanol with 5% sodium hydroxide.

The sepals are almost equal in length, while the petals can be much slender. The lip is pressed closely (adnate to proximal) to half of the column and shows a callus (a stiff protuberance). The column is 3- to 5-toothed at its top.

There are four, almost equal pollinia with an inverted egg shape. There are four stalks (or caudicles) in two pairs. The beak is entire, curved into a half circle and covered with viscous glycoside crystals.

The fruits consist of ellipse-shaped to egg-shaped, 1-locular, 3-winged capsules.

== Taxonomy ==
The genus Prosthechea has only recently (1997; published in 1998) been reestablished by W. E. Higgins as a distinct genus (see references). Two species were later transferred to Euchile (E. citrina and E. mariae) by Withner in 1998. The status of Euchile species as sister to Prosthechea excluding Euchile was confirmed by Higgins in his doctoral dissertation in 2000. Previously, the species had been included in different genera : Anacheilium, Encyclia, Epidendrum, Euchile, Hormidium and Pollardia. The status as genus was confirmed by recent data, based on molecular evidence (nuclear (nrITS) and plastid (matK and trnL-F) DNA sequence data) (W. E. Higgins et al. 2003).

== Distribution ==
This is a neotropical epiphytic genus, widespread across much of Latin America from Mexico to Paraguay, as well as in Florida and the West Indies.

== Species ==
As of May 2023, Plants of the World Online accepts the following species:

Image	Name	Distribution	Elevation (m)
	Prosthechea abbreviata (Schltr.) W.E.Higgins (1997 publ. 1998).	Mexico, Belize, Guatemala, El Salvador, Honduras, Nicaragua, Costa Rica, Panama, Colombia, Ecuador and Peru	100–1,400 metres (330–4,590 ft)
	Prosthechea aemula (Lindl.) W.E.Higgins (1997 publ. 1998).	Panama, Colombia, Ecuador, Peru, Venezuela, Guyana, French Guiana, Surinam, Trinidad and Tobago and Brazil	650–1,800 metres (2,130–5,910 ft)
	Prosthechea alagoensis (Pabst) W.E.Higgins (1997 publ. 1998).	Brazil (Alagoas and Bahia )	800–1,000 metres (2,600–3,300 ft)
	Prosthechea allemanii (Barb.Rodr.) W.E.Higgins (1997 publ. 1998).	Brazil (Minas Gerais and Parana)	1,100–1,400 metres (3,600–4,600 ft)
	Prosthechea allemanoides (Hoehne) W.E.Higgins (1997 publ. 1998).	Brazil ( Espirito Santo, Minas Gerais and São Paulo )	500–1,100 metres (1,600–3,600 ft)
	Prosthechea aloisii (Schltr.) Dodson & Hágsater (1999).	Ecuador (Imbabura)	
	Prosthechea arminii (Rchb.f.) Withner & P.A.Harding (2004).	Colombia and Venezuela	1,200 metres (3,900 ft)
	Prosthechea baculus (Rchb.f.) W.E.Higgins (1997 publ. 1998).	Mexico (Vera Cruz, Oaxaca and Chiapas), Guatemala, Belize, Honduras, El Salvador, Nicaragua and Costa Rica and south to Colombia and Brazil	400–1,700 metres (1,300–5,600 ft)
	Prosthechea barbozae Pupulin (2004).	Costa Rica	900 metres (3,000 ft)
	Prosthechea bennettii (Christenson) W.E.Higgins (1997 publ. 1998).	Peru	2,000–4,150 metres (6,560–13,620 ft)
	Prosthechea bicamerata (Rchb.f.) W.E.Higgins (1997 publ. 1998).	Mexico	1,900–2,600 metres (6,200–8,500 ft)
	Prosthechea bohnkiana V.P.Castro & G.F.Carr(2004).	Brazil (Bahia)	1,000 metres (3,300 ft)
	Prosthechea boothiana (Lindl.) W.E.Higgins (1997 publ. 1998).	Florida, Bahamas, Dominican Republic, Haiti, Cuba, Caymans, Mexico, Guatemala and Belize	0–1,500 metres (0–4,921 ft)
	Prosthechea borsiana (Campacci) Van den Berg (2015)	Peru (Amazonas) and Brazil (Goias)	
	Prosthechea brachiata (A.Rich. & Galeotti) W.E.Higgins (1997 publ. 1998).	Mexico (Guerrero and Oaxaca)	1,700–2,200 metres (5,600–7,200 ft)
	Prosthechea brachychila (Lindl.) W.E.Higgins (1997 publ. 1998).	Colombia, and Venezuela	2,000–2,700 metres (6,600–8,900 ft)
	Prosthechea brassavolae (Rchb.f.) W.E.Higgins (1997 publ. 1998).	Mexico Guatemala, Belize, Honduras, El Salvador, Nicaragua, Costa Rica and Panama	900–2,500 metres (3,000–8,200 ft)
	Prosthechea bueraremensis (Campacci) Van den Berg(2015)	Brazil (Bahia)	800–900 metres (2,600–3,000 ft)
	Prosthechea bulbosa (Vell.) W.E.Higgins (1997 publ. 1998).	southeastern Brazil	1,000–1,300 metres (3,300–4,300 ft)
	Prosthechea caetensis (Bicalho) W.E.Higgins (1997 publ. 1998).	Brazil (Minas Gerais and Bahia)	
	Prosthechea calamaria (Lindl.) W.E.Higgins (1997 publ. 1998).	Colombia, Venezuela, Brazil and Bolivia	220–1,400 metres (720–4,590 ft)
	Prosthechea campos-portoi (Pabst) W.E.Higgins (1997 publ. 1998).	Brazil (Espirito Santo)	
	Prosthechea campylostalix (Rchb.f.) W.E.Higgins (1997 publ. 1998).	Guatemala, Panama and Costa Rica	1,200–2,000 metres (3,900–6,600 ft)
	Prosthechea carrii V.P.Castro & Campacci (2001).	Brazil (Bahia)	1,200–1,600 metres (3,900–5,200 ft)
	Prosthechea chacaoensis (Rchb.f.) W.E.Higgins (1997 publ. 1998).	Mexico, Guatemala, Belize, El Salvador, Honduras Nicaragua, Costa Rica, Panama, Colombia and Venezuela	0–1,200 metres (0–3,937 ft)
	Prosthechea chimborazoensis (Schltr.) W.E.Higgins	Panama to Ecuador and Venezuela	
	Prosthechea chondylobulbon (A.Rich. & Galeotti) W.E.Higgins (1997 publ. 1998).	Mexico (Nayarit, Jalisco, Colima, Michoacan, Guerrero, Mexico, Oaxaca, Vera Cruz, Puebla and Chiapas), Guatemala and El Salvador	1,000–2,600 metres (3,300–8,500 ft)
	Prosthechea christensonii (Harding) W.E.Higgins (2009)	Ecuador	
	Prosthechea christyana (Rchb.f.) Garay & Withner (2001).	Bolivia	
	Prosthechea citrina (Lex.) W.E.Higgins(1997 publ. 1998)	Mexico	1,300–2,600 metres (4,300–8,500 ft)
	Prosthechea cochleata (L.) W.E.Higgins (1997 publ. 1998).	Florida, Mexico, Guatemala, Belize, El Salvador, Honduras, Nicaragua, Costa Rica, Panama, Bahamas, Cuba, Dominican Republic, Haiti, Jamaica, Cayman Islands, Leewards, Puerto Rica, Windwards, French Guiana, Surinam, Guyana, Venezuela and Colombia	1,900 metres (6,200 ft)
	Prosthechea concolor (Lex.) W.E.Higgins (1997 publ. 1998).	Mexico (Jalisco, Michoacan, Mexico, Morelos, Guerrero, Oaxaca and Puebla)	1,500–2,100 metres (4,900–6,900 ft)
	Prosthechea crassilabia (Poepp. & Endl.) Carnevali & I.Ramírez	Cuba, Dominican Republic, Haiti, Trinidad & Tobago, Nicaragua, Costa Rica, Panama, Colombia, Ecuador, Peru, Venezuela, Surinam, French Guiana, and Guyana	1,200–1,900 metres (3,900–6,200 ft)
	Prosthechea cretacea (Dressler & G.E.Pollard) W.E.Higgins (1997 publ. 1998).	Mexico (Michoacan, Mexico, Morelos, Guerrero and Oaxaca)	2,200–2,600 metres (7,200–8,500 ft)
	Prosthechea ebanii Chiron & V.P.Castro(2008)	Brazil ( Espirito Santo)	
	Prosthechea elisae Chiron & V.P.Castro (2003).	Brazil (Espirito Santo)	500 metres (1,600 ft)
	Prosthechea faresiana (Bicalho) W.E.Higgins (1997 publ. 1998).	Brazil (Minas Gerais)	1,000–1,500 metres (3,300–4,900 ft)
	Prosthechea farfanii Christenson (2002).	Peru	2,100–2,600 metres (6,900–8,500 ft)
	Prosthechea fausta (Rchb.f. ex Cogn.) W.E.Higgins (1997 publ. 1998).	Brazil	700 metres (2,300 ft)
	Prosthechea favoris (Rchb.f.) Salazar & Soto Arenas (2001).	Mexico	
	Prosthechea fortunae (Dressler) W.E.Higgins (1997 publ. 1998).	Panama (Chiriqui)	
	Prosthechea fragrans (Sw.) W.E.Higgins (1997 publ. 1998).	Mexico, Guatemala, Honduras, Nicaragua, Costa Rica, Panama, Cuba, Dominican Republic, Haiti, Leewards, Trinidad & Tobago, Windwards, French Guiana, Surinam, Guyana, Venezuela, Colombia, Ecuador, Peru, Bolivia and Brazil	2,000 metres (6,600 ft)
	Prosthechea fuertesii (Cogn.) Christenson (2008)	Cuba to Hispaniola.	
	Prosthechea garciana (Garay & Dunst.) W.E.Higgins (1997 publ. 1998).	Venezuela	1,200 metres (3,900 ft)
	Prosthechea ghiesbreghtiana (A.Rich. & Galeotti) W.E.Higgins (1997 publ. 1998).	Mexico (Guerrero and Oaxaca)	2,000–2,700 metres (6,600–8,900 ft)
	Prosthechea gilbertoi (Garay) W.E.Higgins (1997 publ. 1998).	Colombia	2,000–2,200 metres (6,600–7,200 ft)
	Prosthechea glauca Knowles & Westc. (1838).	Mexico, Guatemala, Honduras and El Salvador	900–2,100 metres (3,000–6,900 ft)
	Prosthechea glumacea (Lindl.) W.E.Higgins (1997 publ. 1998).	Nicaragua, Guatemala, Ecuador and Brazil	50 metres (160 ft)
	Prosthechea grammatoglossa (Rchb.f.) W.E.Higgins (1997 publ. 1998).	Venezuela, Colombia, Ecuador, Peru and Bolivia	750–2,100 metres (2,460–6,890 ft)
	Prosthechea greenwoodiana (Aguirre-Olav.) W.E.Higgins (1997 publ. 1998).	Mexico (Oaxaca)	2,020 metres (6,630 ft)
	Prosthechea guttata (Schltr.) Christenson (2003).	Mexico	1,400–2,400 metres (4,600–7,900 ft)
	Prosthechea hajekii D.E.Benn. & Christenson (2001).	Peru ( Junin)	1,800 metres (5,900 ft)
	Prosthechea hartwegii (Lindl.) W.E.Higgins (1997 publ. 1998).	Venezuela, Colombia, Ecuador, Peru and Bolivia	1,300–3,100 metres (4,300–10,200 ft)
	Prosthechea hastata (Lindl.) W.E.Higgins (1997 publ. 1998).	Mexico (Guerrero and Oaxaca )	2,400 to 2,700 metres (7,900 to 8,900 ft)
	Prosthechea ionocentra (Rchb.f.) W.E.Higgins (1997 publ. 1998).	Costa Rica, Panama and Colombia	900–1,600 metres (3,000–5,200 ft)
	Prosthechea ionophlebia (Rchb.f.) W.E.Higgins (1997 publ. 1998).	Costa Rica and Panama	700–1,100 metres (2,300–3,600 ft)
	Prosthechea itabirinhensis (Campacci) J.M.H.Shaw	Brazil (Minas Gerais)	1,245 metres (4,085 ft)
	Prosthechea jauana (Carnevali & I.Ramírez) W.E.Higgins (1997 publ. 1998).	Venezuela	
	Prosthechea joaquingarciana Pupulin (2001).	Costa Rica	1,800–2,000 metres (5,900–6,600 ft)
	Prosthechea karwinskii (Mart.) J.M.H.Shaw	Mexico (Oaxaca)	1,300–2,600 metres (4,300–8,500 ft)
	Prosthechea kautskyi (Pabst) W.E.Higgins	Brazil (Espirito Santo )	500–1,200 metres (1,600–3,900 ft)
	Prosthechea lambda (Linden ex Rchb.f.) W.E.Higgins (1997 publ. 1998).	Colombia	200–250 metres (660–820 ft)
	Prosthechea lindenii (Lindl.) W.E.Higgins (1997 publ. 1998).	Colombia and Venezuela	1,600–2,000 metres (5,200–6,600 ft)
	Prosthechea livida (Lindl.) W.E.Higgins (1997 publ. 1998)	Mexico, Belize, Guatemala, El Salvador, Honduras, Nicaragua, Costa Rica, Panama, Colombia, Venezuela and Ecuador	0–1,600 metres (0–5,249 ft)
	Prosthechea macrothyrsodes (Rchb.f.) Christenson	Colombia	
	Prosthechea madrensis (Schltr.) Karremans	Mexico, El Salvador and Nicaragua	600–1,050 metres (1,970–3,440 ft)
	Prosthechea magnispatha (Ames, F.T.Hubb. & C.Schweinf.) W.E.Higgins (1997 publ. 1998).	Mexico	800–1,800 metres (2,600–5,900 ft)
	Prosthechea marciliana (Campacci) W.E.Higgins	Brazil (Mato Grosso)	300–400 metres (980–1,310 ft)
	Prosthechea mariae (Ames) W.E.Higgins	Mexico	1,000–1,200 metres (3,300–3,900 ft)
	Prosthechea megahybos (Schltr.) Dodson & Hágsater (1999).	Colombia, Ecuador, Peru and Bolivia	900–1,200 metres (3,000–3,900 ft)
	Prosthechea mejia (Withner & P.A.Harding) W.E.Higgins	Colombia	
	Prosthechea michuacana (Lex.) W.E.Higgins (1997 publ. 1998)	Mexico (Michoacan, Mexico, Morelos, Guerrero, Oaxaca, Hidalgo, Vera Cruz, and Chiapas ), Guatemala and Honduras	1,500–2,800 metres (4,900–9,200 ft)
	Prosthechea micropus (Rchb.f.) W.E.Higgins (2005)	Mexico (Nayarit, Jaslisco, Guerrero, Mexico, Morelos, and Oaxaca )	1,200–2,000 metres (3,900–6,600 ft)
	Prosthechea moojenii (Pabst) W.E.Higgins (1997 publ. 1998).	Brazil ( Bahia and Minas Gerais)	300 metres (980 ft)
	Prosthechea mulasii Soto Arenas & L.Cerv. (2002 publ. 2003).	Mexico (Guerrero, Jalisco and Mexico) and Guatemala	1,800–2,200 metres (5,900–7,200 ft)
	Prosthechea neglecta Pupulin (2001).	Costa Rica	1,900–2,800 metres (6,200–9,200 ft)
	Prosthechea neurosa (Ames) W.E.Higgins (1997 publ. 1998).	Mexico (Chiapas), Belize, Guatemala and Costa Rica	700–1,100 metres (2,300–3,600 ft)
	Prosthechea obpiribulbon (Hágsater) W.E.Higgins (1997 publ. 1998).	Mexico (Oaxaca to Jalisco)	1,300–2,700 metres (4,300–8,900 ft)
	Prosthechea ochracea (Lindl.) W.E.Higgins (1997 publ. 1998).	Mexico, Guatemala, Honduras, El Salvador, Nicaragua, Costa Rica and Panama	500–3,500 metres (1,600–11,500 ft)
	Prosthechea ortizii (Dressler) W.E.Higgins (1997 publ. 1998).	Costa Rica	
	Prosthechea pachysepala (Klotzsch) Chiron & V.P.Castro	Brazil ( Rio de Janeiro, Minas Gerais and São Paulo)	1,000 metres (3,300 ft)
	Prosthechea pamplonensis (Rchb.f.) W.E.Higgins (1997 publ. 1998).	Venezuela and Ecuador	1,800–2,700 metres (5,900–8,900 ft)
	Prosthechea panthera (Rchb.f.) W.E.Higgins (1997 publ. 1998).	Mexico(Oaxaca and Chiapas) and Guatemala	1,300–2,100 metres (4,300–6,900 ft)
	Prosthechea papilio (Vell.) W.E.Higgins (1997 publ. 1998).	Brazil (Espirito Santo, Minas Gerais near Serra da Canastra, Rio de Janeiro, Rio Grande do Sul and Santa Catalina)	
	Prosthechea pastoris (Lex.) Espejo & López-Ferr. (2000).	Mexico	100–2,500 metres (330–8,200 ft)
	Prosthechea pitengoensis (T.V.S.Campacci & Laitano) J.M.H.Shaw	Brasil (Minas Geraias)	600 metres (2,000 ft)
	Prosthechea pringlei (Rolfe) W.E.Higgins (1997 publ. 1998).	Mexico (Michoacan, Mexico, Morelos, Guerrero and Oaxaca )	1,800–2,500 metres (5,900–8,200 ft)
	Prosthechea prismatocarpa (Rchb.f.) W.E.Higgins (1997 publ. 1998).	Costa Rica and Panama	1,200–3,300 metres (3,900–10,800 ft)
	Prosthechea pseudopygmaea (Finet) W.E.Higgins	Mexico, Guatemala, El Salvador, Honduras, Costa Rica and Panama	1,400–2,700 metres (4,600–8,900 ft)
	Prosthechea pterocarpa (Lindl.) W.E.Higgins (1997 publ. 1998).	Mexico	550–2,200 metres (1,800–7,220 ft)
	Prosthechea pulcherrima (Klotzsch) W.E.Higgins (1997 publ. 1998).	Peru	
	Prosthechea pulchra Dodson & W.E.Higgins (2001).	Ecuador and Bolivia	2,600 metres (8,500 ft)
	Prosthechea punctulata (Rchb.f.) Soto Arenas & Salazar	Mexico (Sinaloa, Jalisco, Michoacan, Mexico, Morelos, Guerrero)	1,500–2,300 metres (4,900–7,500 ft)
	Prosthechea pygmaea (Hook.) W.E.Higgins (1997 publ. 1998).	Florida, Cuba, Dominican Republic, Haiti, Jamaica, Leewards?, Puerto Rico, Trinidad & Tobago, Windwards, Mexico, Guatemala, Belize, Honduras, Nicaragua, Costa Rica, Panama, French Guiana, Surinam, Guyana, Venezuela, Colombia, Ecuador, Peru, Bolivia and Brazil	0–1,700 metres (0–5,577 ft)
	Prosthechea racemifera (Dressler) W.E.Higgins (1997 publ. 1998).	Costa Rica and Panama	600–1,500 metres (2,000–4,900 ft)
	Prosthechea radiata (Lindl.) W.E.Higgins (1997 publ. 1998).	Mexico (San Luis Potosí, Querétaro Hidalgo, Puebla, Veracruz, Oaxaca, Tabasco and Chiapas), Guatemala, Honduras and Belize to Costa Rica, Panama, Colombia	150–2,000 metres (490–6,560 ft)
	Prosthechea regentii V.P.Castro & Chiron	Brazil (Minas Gerais)	500–700 metres (1,600–2,300 ft)
	Prosthechea regnelliana (Hoehne & Schltr.) W.E.Higgins (1997 publ. 1998).	Brazil (Minas Gerais)	
	Prosthechea rhynchophora (A.Rich. & Galeotti) W.E.Higgins (1997 publ. 1998).	Mexico, Guatemala, Honduras and Nicaragua	950–2,000 metres (3,120–6,560 ft)
	Prosthechea roraimensis V.P.Castro & Campacci	Brazil (Roraima)	600–1,000 metres (2,000–3,300 ft)
	Prosthechea sceptra (Lindl.) W.E.Higgins (1997 publ. 1998).	Venezuela, Colombia and Ecuador	150–2,000 metres (490–6,560 ft)
	Prosthechea schunkiana (Campacci & P.A.Harding) W.E.Higgins	Brazil (Minas Gerais)	600 metres (2,000 ft)
	Prosthechea semiaperta (Hágsater) W.E.Higgins	Mexico (Guerrero and Oaxaca )	500–2,500 metres (1,600–8,200 ft)
	Prosthechea serpentilingua Withner & D.G.Hunt	Brazil	
	Prosthechea sessiliflora (Edwall) W.E.Higgins (1997 publ. 1998).	Brazil (São Paulo and Minas Gerais)	
	Prosthechea silvana Cath. & V.P.Castro (2003).	Brazil (Bahia)	400–800 metres (1,300–2,600 ft)
	Prosthechea sima (Dressler) W.E.Higgins (1997 publ. 1998).	Panama and Colombia	600–1,400 metres (2,000–4,600 ft)
	Prosthechea spondiada (Rchb.f.) W.E.Higgins (1997 publ. 1998).	Costa Rica, Jamaica, and Panama	900–2,100 metres (3,000–6,900 ft)
	Prosthechea squalida (Lex.) Soto Arenas & Salazar	Mexico (Nayarit, Jalisco, Coloma, Michoacan, Guerrerro, Mexico, Moreles, Oaxaca and Vera Cruz)	500–2,300 metres (1,600–7,500 ft)
	Prosthechea suzanensis (Hoehne) W.E.Higgins (1997 publ. 1998).	Brazil (Minas Gerais, São Paulo)	
	Prosthechea tardiflora Mora-Ret. ex Pupulin (2001).	Costa Rica	500–600 metres (1,600–2,000 ft)
	Prosthechea terassaniana (Campacci & P.A.Harding) W.E.Higgins	Brazil (São Paulo)	200–300 metres (660–980 ft)
	Prosthechea tigrina (Linden ex Lindl.) W.E.Higgins (1997 publ. 1998).	Brazil, Colombia, Ecuador, Peru, Venezuela and the Guianas	2,100–2,700 metres (6,900–8,900 ft)
	Prosthechea tinukiana Bogarín & Karremans	Costa Rica	2,450 metres (8,040 ft)
	Prosthechea trulla (Rchb.f.) W.E.Higgins (1997 publ. 1998).	Mexico	300–1,500 metres (980–4,920 ft)
	Prosthechea vagans (Ames) W.E.Higgins (1997 publ. 1998).	Mexico, Guatemala, El Salvador, and Costa Rica	1,400–1,950 metres (4,590–6,400 ft)
	Prosthechea varicosa (Bateman ex Lindl.) W.E.Higgins (1997 publ. 1998).	Mexico (Jalisco, Michoacan, Guerrero, Morelos, Oaxaca, Vera Cruz, Puebla, and Hidalgo)	1,500–2,800 metres (4,900–9,200 ft)
	Prosthechea vasquezii Christenson (2003).	Bolivia.	
	Prosthechea venezuelana (Schltr.) W.E.Higgins (1997 publ. 1998).	Venezuela, Colombia and Ecuador	450 metres (1,480 ft)
	Prosthechea vespa (Vell.) W.E.Higgins (1997 publ. 1998).	Brazil	15–1,000 metres (49–3,281 ft)
	Prosthechea villae-rosae P.Ortiz	Colombia (Cundinamarca)	2,800 metres (9,200 ft)
	Prosthechea vita (D.G.Hunt, Withner & P.A.Harding) J.M.H.Shaw	Ecuador	
	Prosthechea vitellina (Lindl.) W.E.Higgins (1997 publ. 1998).	Mexico, Nicaragua and Honduras	1,400–2,600 metres (4,600–8,500 ft)
	Prosthechea widgrenii (Lindl.) W.E.Higgins (1997 publ. 1998).	Brazil (Minas Gerais)	500–1,000 metres (1,600–3,300 ft)

=== Natural Hybrids ===
- Prosthechea × chixoyensis E.Mó & Cetzal
- Prosthechea × intermedia (Campacci) J.M.H.Shaw
