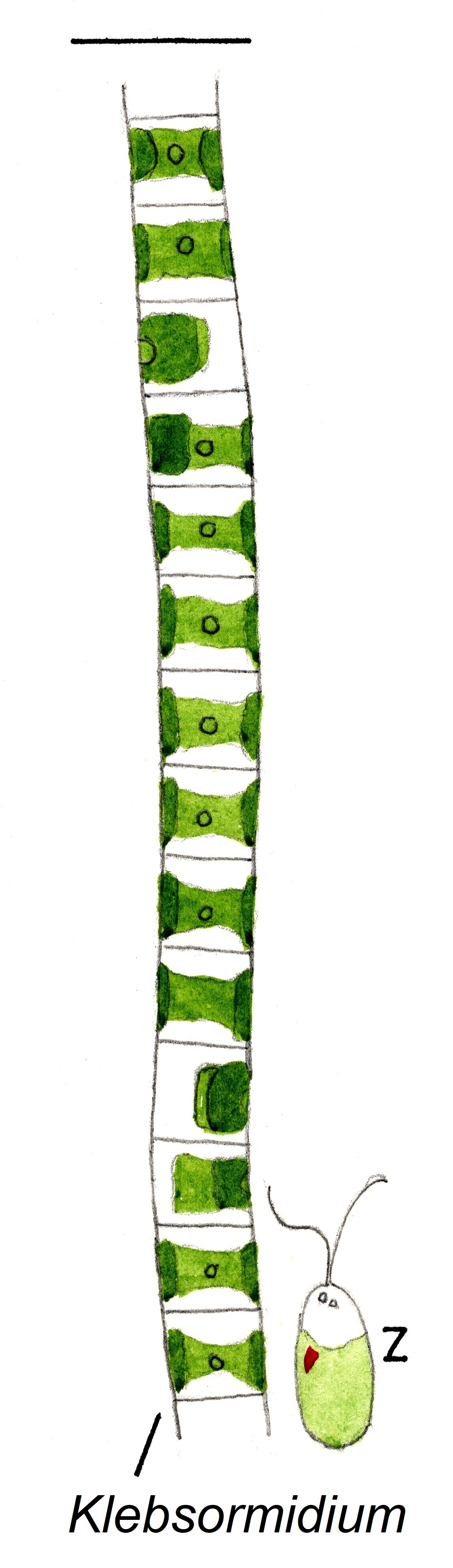

Scientific classification
- Kingdom: Plantae
- Class: Klebsormidiophyceae
- Order: Klebsormidiales
- Family: Klebsormidiaceae
- Genus: Klebsormidium; P.C.Silva, Mattox & W.H.Blackwell

Type species
- Klebsormidium flaccidum P.C.Silva, Mattox & W.H.Blackwell

Species
- See species list.

= Klebsormidium =

Genus of algae

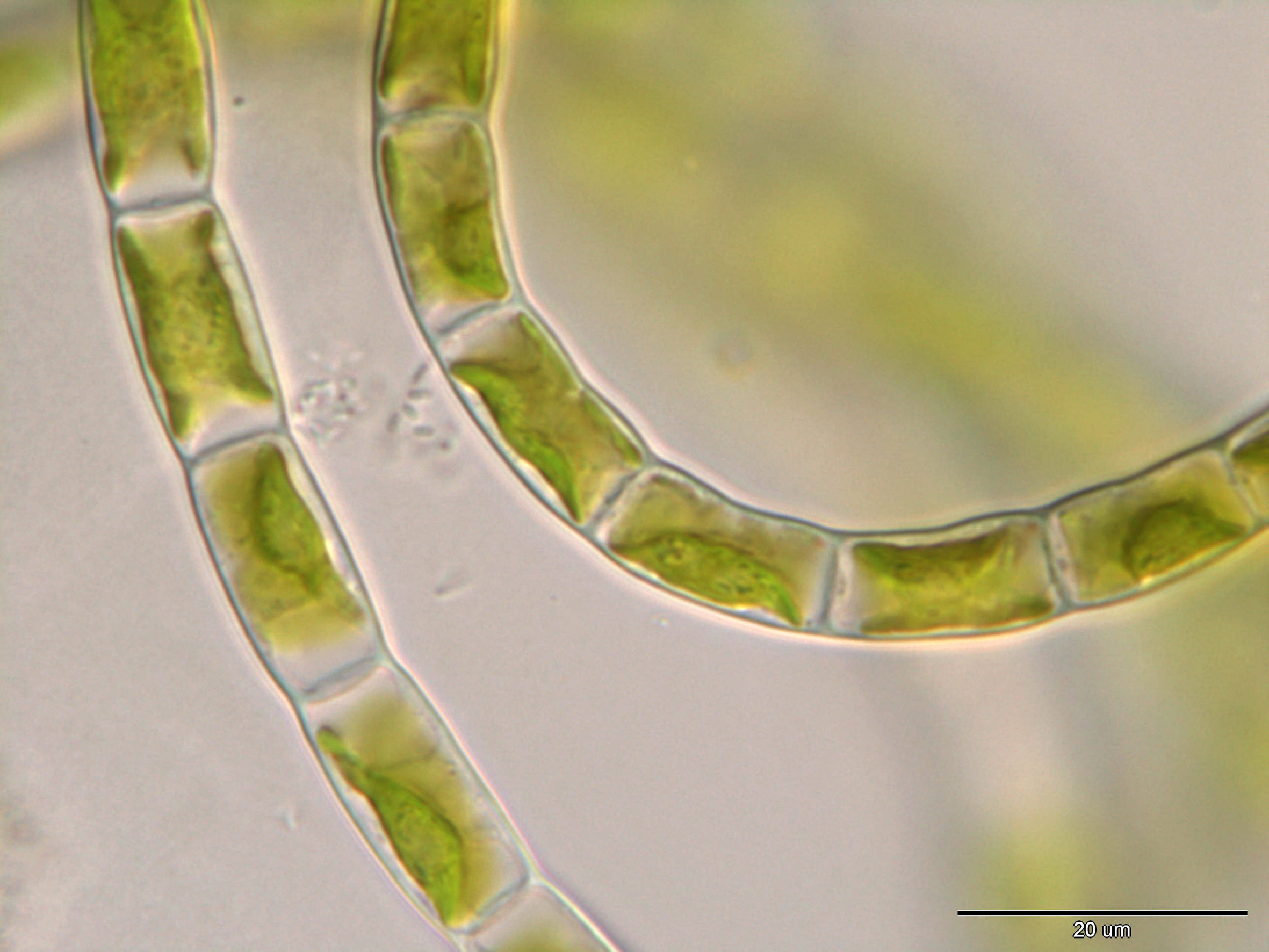
Klebsormidium bilatum

Klebsormidium is a genus of filamentous charophyte green algae comprising 20 species. The name was proposed in 1972 to resolve confusion in application and status of Hormidium (Note: Hormidium nitens G.A.Klebs 1896) and was given for the German botanist Georg Albrecht Klebs. (Note: Georg Albrecht Klebs (1857-1918) Dinophyceae, Chrysophyceae and Xanthophyceae specialist)

The algae occurs mostly in soil and on moist substrates, nevertheless, aquatic and one marine species are also known. Many Klebsormidium-species are able to synthesize substances for UV protection, the so-called mycosporine-like amino acids. The draft genome sequence of Klebsormidium nitens NIES-2285 (called K. flaccidum at the time of publication) was published in 2014.

== Description ==
Klebsormidium forms uniseriate (one cell thick), unbranched filaments. Cells are cylindrical or barrel-shaped. The cell wall may be thin or thickened, and is sometimes made of H-shaped pieces. Each cell contains a single parietal chloroplast which encircles around 40 to 70% of the cell wall, usually with a single pyrenoid.

Klebsormidium reproduces asexually but not sexually. It produces zoospores with two flagella, which are released from cells through a pore. It can also produce aplanospores and akinetes.

The genus can be difficult to distinguish from Ulothrix, but Ulothrix tends to have chloroplasts that are wider and encircling nearly all of the cell.

== Species ==
The valid species currently considered to belong to this genus are:

- Klebsormidium acidophilum
- Klebsormidium bilatum
- Klebsormidium crenulatum
- Klebsormidium dissectum
- Klebsormidium drouetii
- Klebsormidium elegans
- Klebsormidium flaccidum
- Klebsormidium fluitans
- Klebsormidium fragile
- Klebsormidium klebsii
- Klebsormidium lamellosum
- Klebsormidium montanum
- Klebsormidium mucosum
- Klebsormidium nitens
- Klebsormidium pseudostichococcus
- Klebsormidium scopulinum
- Klebsormidium sterile
- Klebsormidium subtile
- Klebsormidium subtilissimum
- Klebsormidium tribonematoideum

The species of Klebsormidium are in critical need of a taxonomic revision. Traditional morphological characteristics used to delimit the taxa, such as the width of filaments or shape of cells, are unreliable and do not map well to phylogenetic groups.
