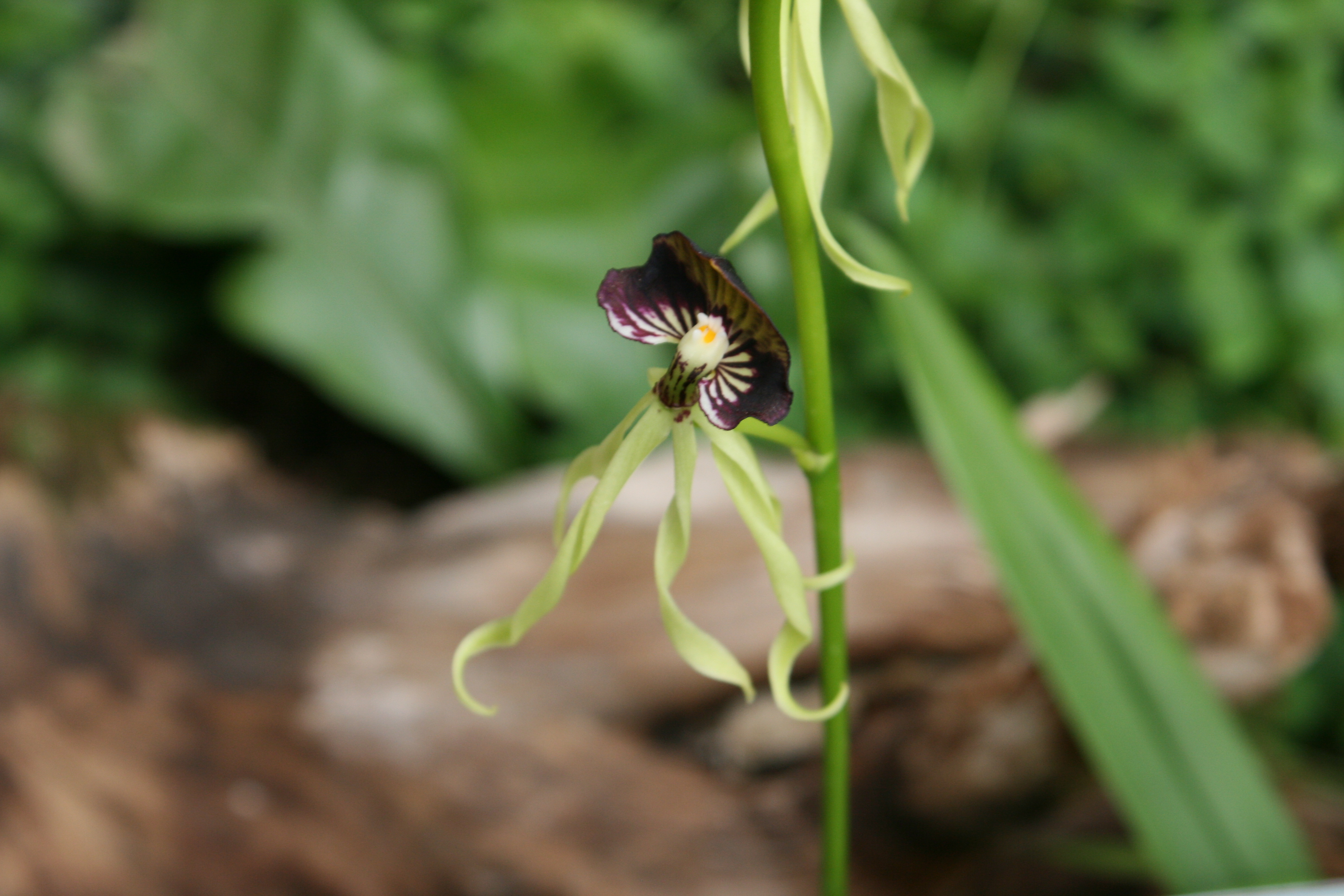

Scientific classification
- Kingdom: Plantae
- Clade: Embryophytes
- Clade: Tracheophytes
- Clade: Spermatophytes
- Clade: Angiosperms
- Clade: Monocots
- Order: Asparagales
- Family: Orchidaceae
- Subfamily: Epidendroideae
- Genus: Prosthechea
- Species: P. cochleata

Binomial name
- Prosthechea cochleata (L.) W.E.Higgins

Synonyms
- Anacheilium cochleatum; Encyclia cochleata; Epidendrum cochleatum

= Prosthechea cochleata =

Species of orchid

Prosthechea cochleata, commonly referred to as the clamshell orchid or cockleshell orchid, is an epiphytic, sympodial New World orchid native to Central America, the West Indies, Colombia, Venezuela, and southern Florida. It is also known as the black orchid in Belize, where it is the national flower.

Each oblong discoid pseudobulb bears one or two linear nonsucculent leaves. The flowers are unusual in that though the labellum is usually below the column in the orchids, in the members of Prosthechea the labellum forms a "hood" over the column. This makes the flower effectively upside down, or non-resupinate. Whereas the species usually has one anther, Prosthechea cochleata var. triandra is an endangered variety that has three anthers and is autogamous, allowing its existence in Florida where no appropriate pollinators appear to be present.

P. cochleata is common in cultivation, and is valued for its uniquely shaped and long-lasting flowers on continually growing racemes. Several hybrids have been produced with this species, including the popular Prosthechea Green Hornet. (still often listed as Encyclia Green Hornet)
