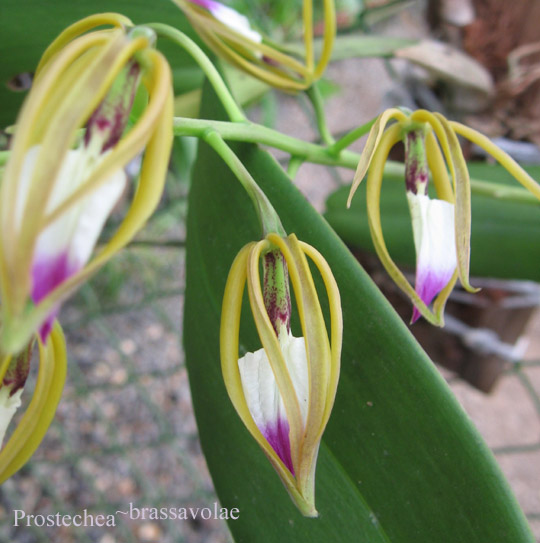

Scientific classification
- Kingdom: Plantae
- Clade: Tracheophytes
- Clade: Angiosperms
- Clade: Monocots
- Order: Asparagales
- Family: Orchidaceae
- Subfamily: Epidendroideae
- Genus: Prosthechea
- Species: P. brassavolae

Binomial name
- Prosthechea brassavolae (Rchb.f.) W.E.Higgins

Synonyms
- Encyclia brassavolae (Rchb.f.) Dressler; Epidendrum brassavolae Rchb.f.; Hormidium brassavolae (Rchb. f.) Brieger; Panarica brassavolae (Rchb.f.) Withner & P.A.Harding; Pseudencyclia brassavolae (Rchb.f.) V.P.Castro & Chiron

= Prosthechea brassavolae =

Species of orchid

Prosthechea brassavolae is a species of orchid native to Central America and Mexico. It is cultivated by orchid fanciers.
