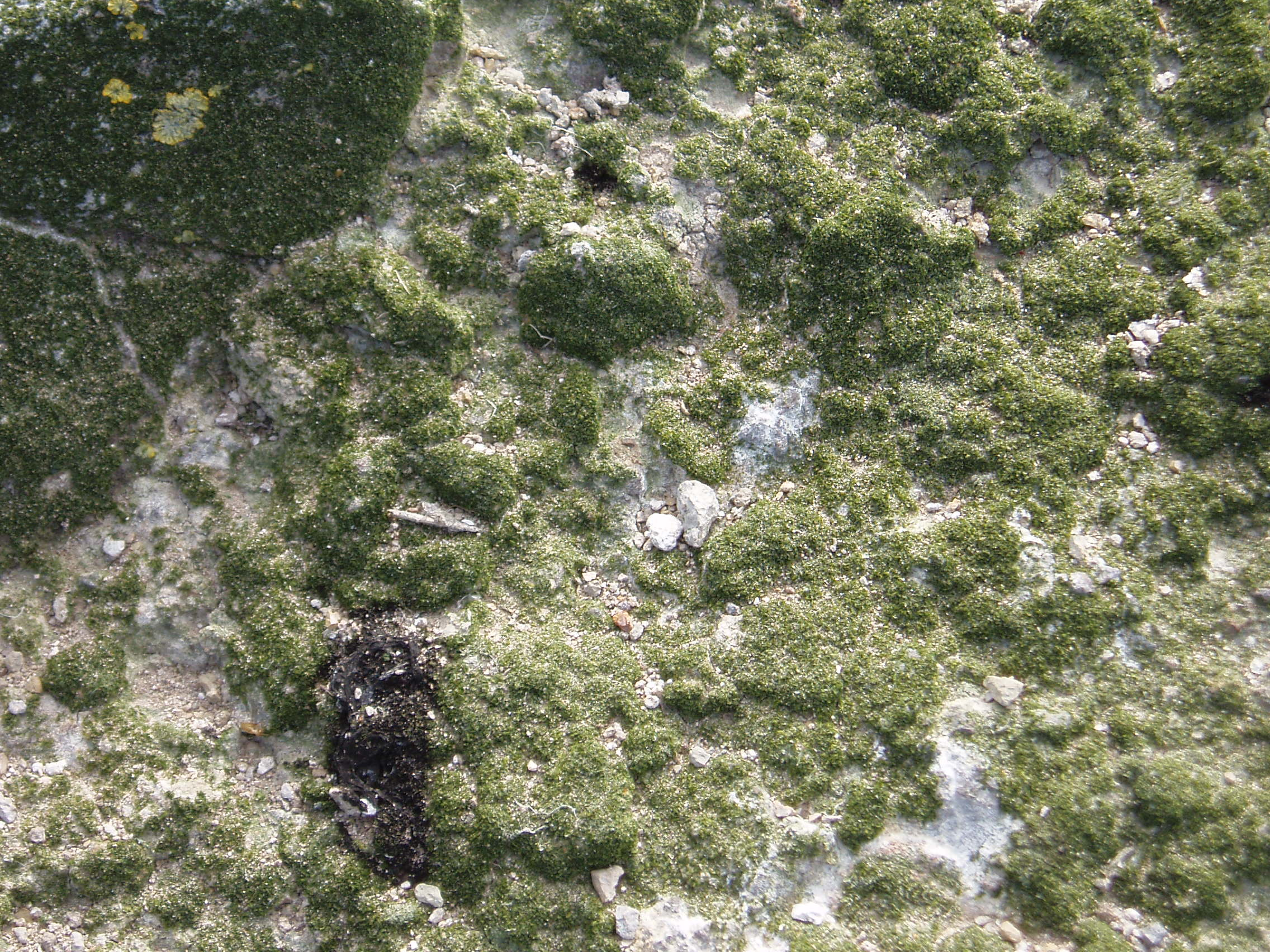

Scientific classification
- Kingdom: Plantae
- Division: Chlorophyta
- Class: Trebouxiophyceae
- Order: Prasiolales
- Family: Prasiolaceae
- Genus: Prasiola
- Species: P. stipitata

Binomial name
- Prasiola stipitata Suhr ex Jessen

= Prasiola stipitata =

Species of alga

Prasiola stipitata is a small green alga of the family Praiolaceae. This species has been recorded in Iceland, the Faroe Islands, on the Atlantic coasts of North America and Europe as well as on the coasts of Australia and New Zealand. It inhabits cold temperature high-nutrient habitats.

== Description ==
This alga grows to no more than 1 centimeter long, is fan shaped with a distinct stipe. The vegetative frond is monostromatic. The cells in the blade are arranged in packets of 4 or more. In colour the fronds are dark green.

== Habitat ==
P. stipitata thrives in high-nutrient habitats and is therefore often found in the spray water zone of shores frequented by sea birds.

== Distribution ==
Rather erratic in its distribution. Recorded mostly from cold-temperate regions on both hemispheres, e.g. Iceland, the Faroes, Atlantic coasts of North America and Europe, including Great Britain and Ireland, as well as from Australia and New Zealand. This species has also been recorded at the Antipodes, Auckland and Campbell Islands.

== Reproduction ==
Sexual and asexual plants have been recorded.
