= Erzsébet Kol =

Hungarian phycologist who specialized in snow algae

- Kol in 1937
- Born: July 8, 1897; Kolozsvár, Austria-Hungary (now Cluj-Napoca, Romania)
- Died: November 15, 1980 (aged 83); Budapest, Hungary
- Occupation: Phycologist
- Years active: 1925—1959
- Father: Ferenc Kol

Erzsébet Kol (July 8, 1897 – November 15, 1980) was a Hungarian phycologist who specialized in snow algae. Her research, conducted throughout Europe and North America, is considered crucial to the field of algae that live in alpine environments.

== Early life and education ==
Ferenc Kol (1869–1939), Erzsébet's father

Kol was born in Kolozsvár, now Cluj-Napoca in modern-day Romania, on July 8, 1897 to Ferenc Kol and Ida Fülöp. She attended high school in Kolozsvár before attending Franz Joseph University. After World War I, the university relocated to Szeged, where she completed her studies.

== Scientific career ==
Kol graduated with a degree in biology in 1925 and published her first work in the same year on the topic of algae near Szeged, Hungary. She soon also published on alpine algae in 1926 and desmids in the following year. These early publications were all in Hungarian, her native language.

After her graduation from university, she worked as a teaching assistant at Franz Joseph University until 1927, when she became an assistant professor.

In 1930, Kol was awarded the Pál Bugát Prize from the Society of Natural Sciences.

Kol traveled across Europe for her research. In particular, she traveled to various mountain ranges, including, but not limited to, the Alps, Carpathians, Transylvania, and Albania. In 1934, she collaborated with Robert Chodat in Geneva on the topic of unicellular algae's heterotrophic and anaerobic growth.

=== Travels to North America ===
The International Federation of University Women awarded Kol a fellowship of $1,500 in 1935 to pursue her research in a foreign country. This fellowship enabled her to conduct fieldwork in North America for the first time, where she met contemporary phycologists like W.R. Taylor, M.A. Howe and Tracy Hazen. In North America, she looked at "red" and "green" alpine snow. The Smithsonian then further supported her research with another grant to travel far north and work on glaciers.

=== Return to Hungary ===
Upon returning to Hungary, Kol became a full professor (Hungarian: privatdozent) of biology, the second Hungarian woman at the time to have achieved that feat (beat only by Mária Vendl). Kol worked in Kolozsvár until 1948, when she became a researcher for the Botanical Department of the Hungarian National Museum in Budapest.

In 1952, she earned her Candidate of Biological Sciences. She retired from the Hungarian National Museum in 1959.

Illustration of Koliella viretii, one of the algae named for Kol

== Later life and legacy ==
In 1961, Kol won the Géza Entz Prize, awarded by the Hungarian Limnological Society. Kol submitted her application for doctorate in 1973, at the age of 75. It was rejected. She passed away in Budapest on November 15, 1980. She was buried at Farkasréti Cemetery.

In 1995, Kol was named on the list of "phycological trailblazers" by the Phycological Society of America.

The genus Koliella, for an algae found in the Tatra Mountains, is named for her.

== Selected works ==
- Tiszaparttol Alaszkaig (transl. From the banks of the Tisza to Alaska), 1940
- Comparative algological and hydrobiological studies in rice fields in Hungary (1956)
