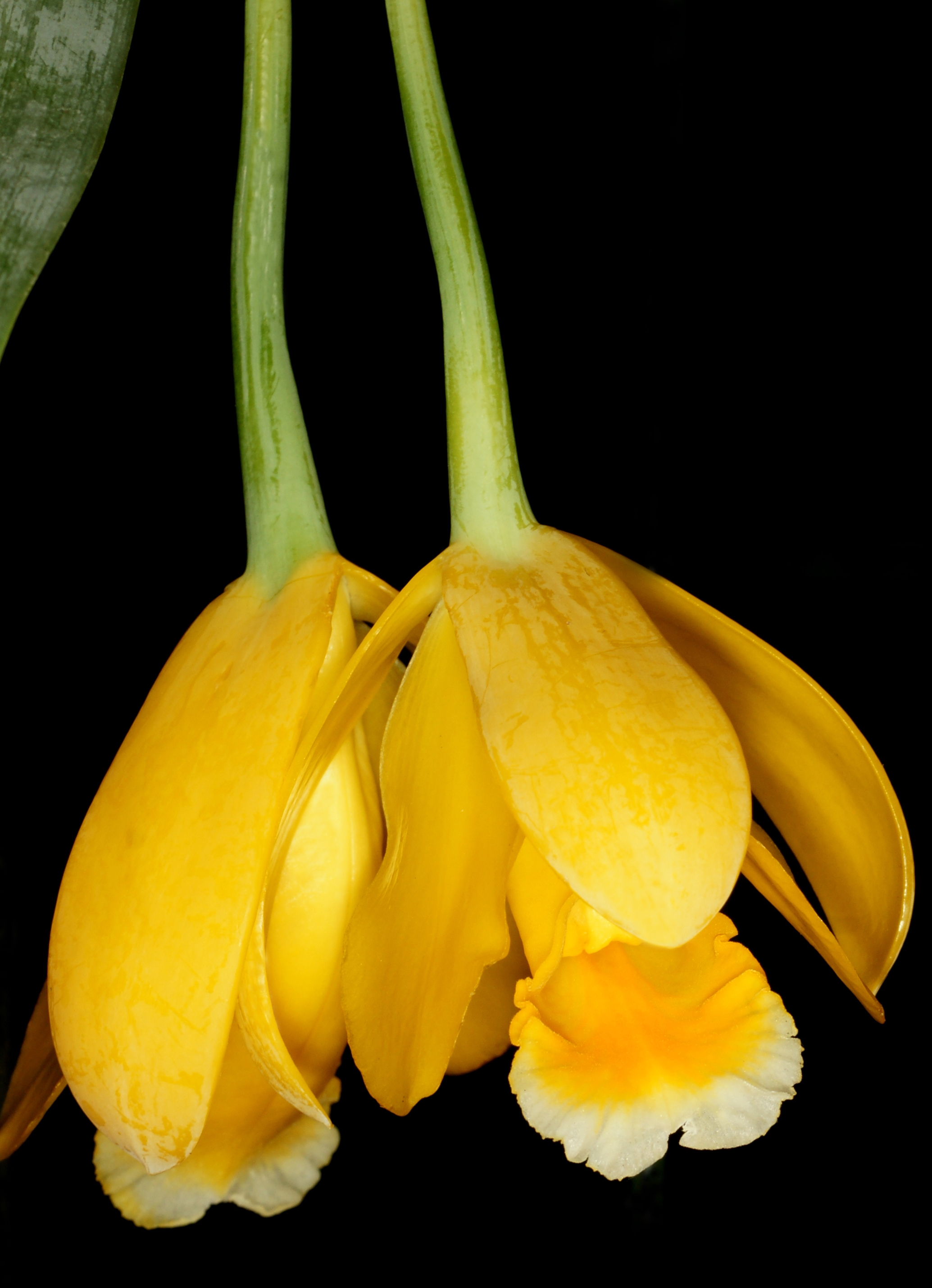

Scientific classification
- Kingdom: Plantae
- Clade: Tracheophytes
- Clade: Angiosperms
- Clade: Monocots
- Order: Asparagales
- Family: Orchidaceae
- Subfamily: Epidendroideae
- Genus: Prosthechea
- Species: P. citrina

Binomial name
- Prosthechea citrina (Lex.) W.E.Higgins

Synonyms
- Cattleya citrina (Lex.) Lindl.; Cattleya sulfurina Lem.; Encyclia citrina (Lex.) Dressler; Epidendrum citrinum (Lex.) Rchb.f.; Euchile citrina (Lex.) Withner; Sobralia citrina Lex.

= Prosthechea citrina =

Species of orchid

Prosthechea citrina, synonym Encyclia citrina, is a species of orchid native to southwest Mexico. It is known as tulip orchid and has a strong lemon fragrance. Its petals are golden yellow with varying degrees of white crenulations in the lip. The plant may be upright or pendant, but the flowers are always pendant. It is also known as the tulip orchid due to its flowers' rounded cup-like shape. It has been referred to for generations as costicoatzontecoxòchitl, meaning "flower in the form of yellow serpent head", by the Nahuas (indigenous peoples of southwestern United States and northwestern Mexico).

== Description ==
P. citrina is epiphytic and has pendant plants and flowers. The plant is compact and has tightly clustered pseudobulbs, 4–6 cm (1.6–2.4 in) in length, 2–3 cm (0.79–1.18 in) wide, with a persistent papery surface. The leaves are silvery-greenish, 2–4 per pseudobulb, elliptical, acute and closely obtuse, 18–25 cm (7.1–9.8 in) in length, 2–4 cm (0.79–1.57 in) wide. The foliage is very noticeable with a fine powdery "film" over the leaves. The plant uniquely grows hanging upside down off a larger trunk or branch of a larger tree, often in rather cool and dry forest environments at 1,300–2,200 m (4,300–7,200 ft) of elevation.

=== Flowers ===
The flowers are grouped as an inflorescence 6–10 cm (2.4–3.9 in) in length, one to two large (5–6.5 cm [2.0–2.6 in]). Its blooms are pale yellow to canary yellow or almost orange with fleshy sepals and petals. Its sepals are elliptical, 5–6.5 cm (2.0–2.6 in) in length, 1.5–2 cm (0.59–0.79 in) wide. Its petals are similar but a little wider. Its lip is more or less the same length, with darker veins and ruffled texture, united with the column at the base. The outer lip is somewhat variable and may be lighter or darker than the petals and sepals. The ovaries are free of any sharp angles or wings, while its pods are rounded and ribbed.

== Distribution ==
P. citrina grows on trees in mixed oak-pine forests in central and southern Mexico.

- Guerrero: Leonardo Bravo.
- Jalisco: Mascota.
- Michoacán: Madero.
- Oaxaca: Mpio. San Pedro Juchatengo, Santo Domingo Albarradas, Dto. Teposcolula.
