= Prasiococcus =

Scientific classification
- Kingdom: Plantae
- Division: Chlorophyta
- Class: Trebouxiophyceae
- Order: Prasiolales
- Family: Prasiolaceae
- Genus: Prasiococcus; Vischer

Species
- Prasiococcus calcarius

Genus of algae

Prasiococcus is a genus of green algae in the family Prasiolaceae.
