= Epidendrum subg. Hormidium =

Scientific classification
- Kingdom: Plantae
- Clade: Tracheophytes
- Clade: Angiosperms
- Clade: Monocots
- Order: Asparagales
- Family: Orchidaceae
- Subfamily: Epidendroideae
- Genus: Epidendrum
- Subgenus: Epidendrum subg. Hormidium; Lindl.

Subgenus of orchids

The subgenus Hormidium of the genus Epidendrum of family Orchidaceae features short pseudobulbs, a creeping growth habit, a very short peduncle, and a lip adnate to the column to its apex. The subgenus was published by Lindley in 1841.

In his 1861 treatise on the Orchidaceae, H. G. Reichenbach included only the five species mentioned by Lindley, after stating that the taxon was a synonym for Epidendrum Aulizeum. Three of Lindley's species are now recognized as synonyms for Prosthechea pygmaea, leaving only two species in Epidendrum subgenus Hormidium (page numbers refer to H. G. Reichenbach 1861):

- E. miserum Lindl. 1841 (p. 346)
- E. serpens Lindl. 1845 (p. 346)

With these species should be included the members of the "Serpens group":

- E. carmelense Hágsater & Dodson 1993
- E. garayi Løjtnant 1977
- E. ilinazae Hágsater & Dodson 1999
- E. moronense Dodson & Hágsater 1989
- E. oxapampense Hágsater 1999
- E. pachacutequianum Hágsater & Collantes 2006
- E. platyphylloserpens Hágsater 2001

E. sophronitis Linden & Rchb.f. (1857) was placed in the genus Hormidium by G. Bentham and J. D. Hooker in 1883.
