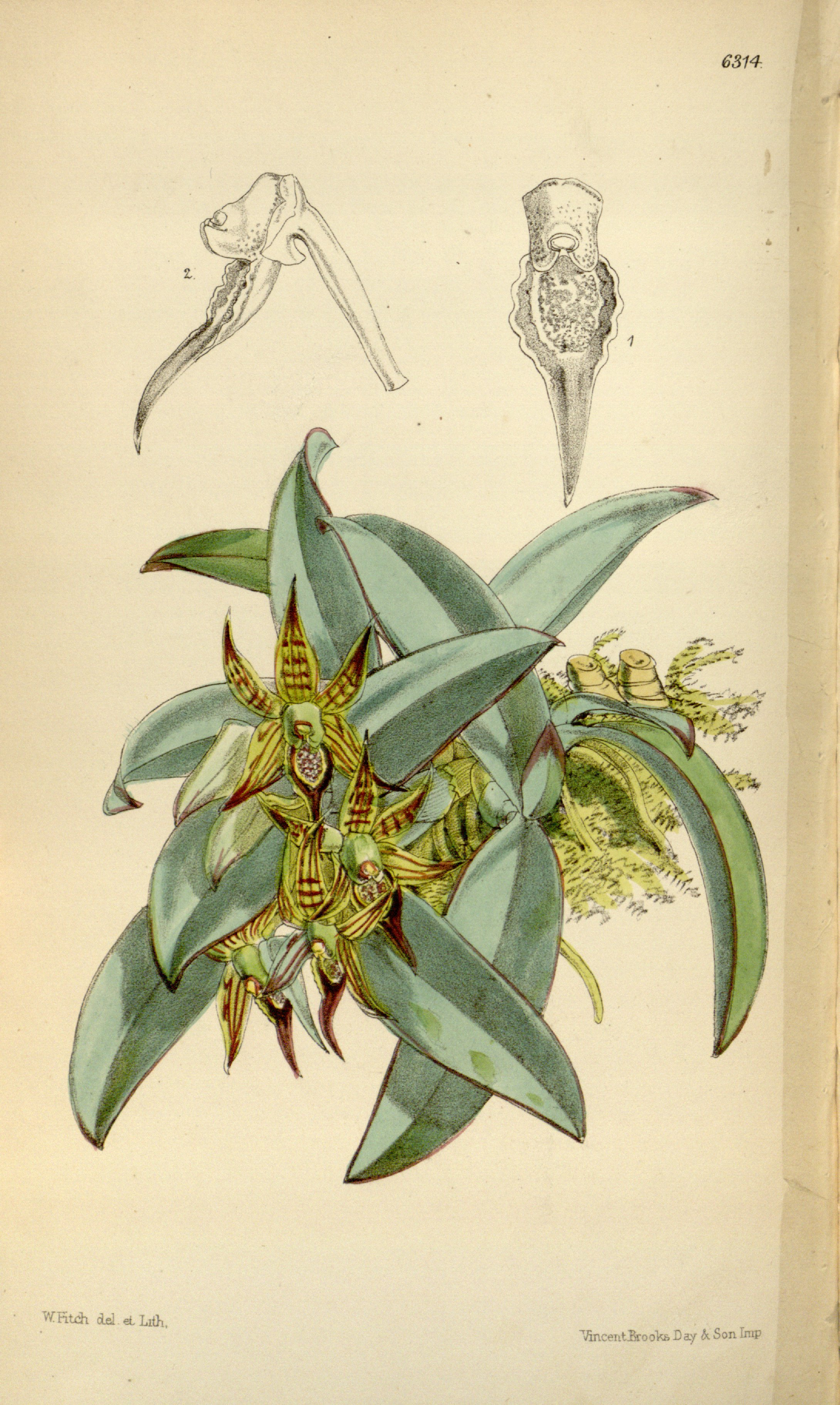

Scientific classification
- Kingdom: Plantae
- Clade: Tracheophytes
- Clade: Angiosperms
- Clade: Monocots
- Order: Asparagales
- Family: Orchidaceae
- Subfamily: Epidendroideae
- Genus: Epidendrum
- Subgenus: Epidendrum subg. Hormidium
- Species: E. sophronitis

Binomial name
- Epidendrum sophronitis Linden & Rchb.f.

Synonyms
- Hormidium sophronitis (Linden & Rchb.f.) Benth. & Hook.f. Kalopteriz sophronitis (Linden & Rchb.f.) Garay & Dunst.

= Epidendrum sophronitis =

Species of orchid

Epidendrum sophronitis Linden & Rchb.f. (1857) is a small Epidendrum orchid that bears a superficial resemblance to a Sophronitis, as the generic epithet was used prior to the year 2000.

== Description ==
Epidendrum sophronitis is a small pendant pseudobulbous epiphyte that grows in deep shade on the lower part of tree trunks in the montane Tropical rainforest at altitudes of 1.5—3.5 km in Ecuador (where the type was collected), and in Peru, including Amazonas and Pasco. The 1 cm tall ovoid pseudobulbs bear 1—3 elliptic 4–8 cm long fleshy leaves, keeled and bluish-green above, purple below. The 1—1.5 cm racemose inflorescence erupts from a sheath at the apex of the pseudobulb and bears up to three relatively large flowers, one at a time. The flowers are overall greenish yellow, with quite variable purple markings. The lanceolate acuminate recurved dorsal sepal is 2—3.5 cm long by 1 cm wide. The lanceolate-triangular acuminate lateral sepals are usually broader but the same length as the dorsal sepal. The lanceolate acuminate petals are smaller than the sepals. The unlobed, acuminate lip is adnate to the column to its apex and 2—3.5 cm long by 1—2.5 cm wide.
