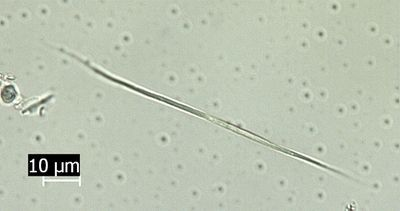
- Koliella longiseta

Scientific classification
- Domain: Eukaryota
- Supergroup: Archaeplastida
- Clade: Viridiplantae
- Division: Chlorophyta
- Class: Trebouxiophyceae
- Order: Prasiolales
- Family: Koliellaceae
- Genus: Koliella; Hindák

Type species
- Koliella spiculiformis (Vischer) Hindák

Species
- Koliella longiseta; Koliella antarctica; Koliella sempervirens

= Koliella =

Genus of algae

Koliella is a genus of green algae in the order Prasiolales. Members of this genus are found in freshwater plankton, but some are also found on snow and ice.

The genus name of Koliella is in honour of Erzsébet Kol (1897-1980), who was a Hungarian phycologist who worked at the Hungarian National Museum in Budapest.

The genus was circumscribed by František Hindák in Nova Hedwigia vol.6 (issues 1/2) on page 99 in 1963.

== Description ==
Koliella consists of straight or curved spindle-shaped or needle-shaped cells. The apices may be rounded, obtuse, acute, or sharply pointed. Cells contain a single parietal chloroplast lining the inside of the cell, which may be straight or spiraled; a pyrenoid may be present or absent. Oil droplets are also present within the cell.

Koliella reproduces vegetatively by cell division; cells usually detach after division, but may occasionally be found in short chains. It is similar to a number of fusiform green algal genera, such as Monoraphidium, Ankistrodesmus, and Schroederia but the cell division is transverse, dividing into two shorter cells. It also reproduces asexually by producing zoospores, which are biflagellate. Sexual reproduction occurs in this genus, and is oogamous, but not much details are known.

== Taxonomy ==
Erzsébet Kol (1897-1980), namesake

Koliella is similar to the genus Raphidonema, and is primarily distinguished from the latter genus in that its cells detach after division (while Raphidonema forms filaments of cells). Some taxonomists suggest that the difference between the two genera is too small to warrant separation, and that Koliella should be considered a synonym of Raphidonema. For example, filaments of Raphidonema often separate into single cells akin to Koliella when placed in a liquid medium.

As currently defined, the genus Koliella is polyphyletic; the type species K. spiculiformis is closely related to Chlorella while other species (K. longiseta and K. sempervirens) appear to be more closely related to Stichococcus.
