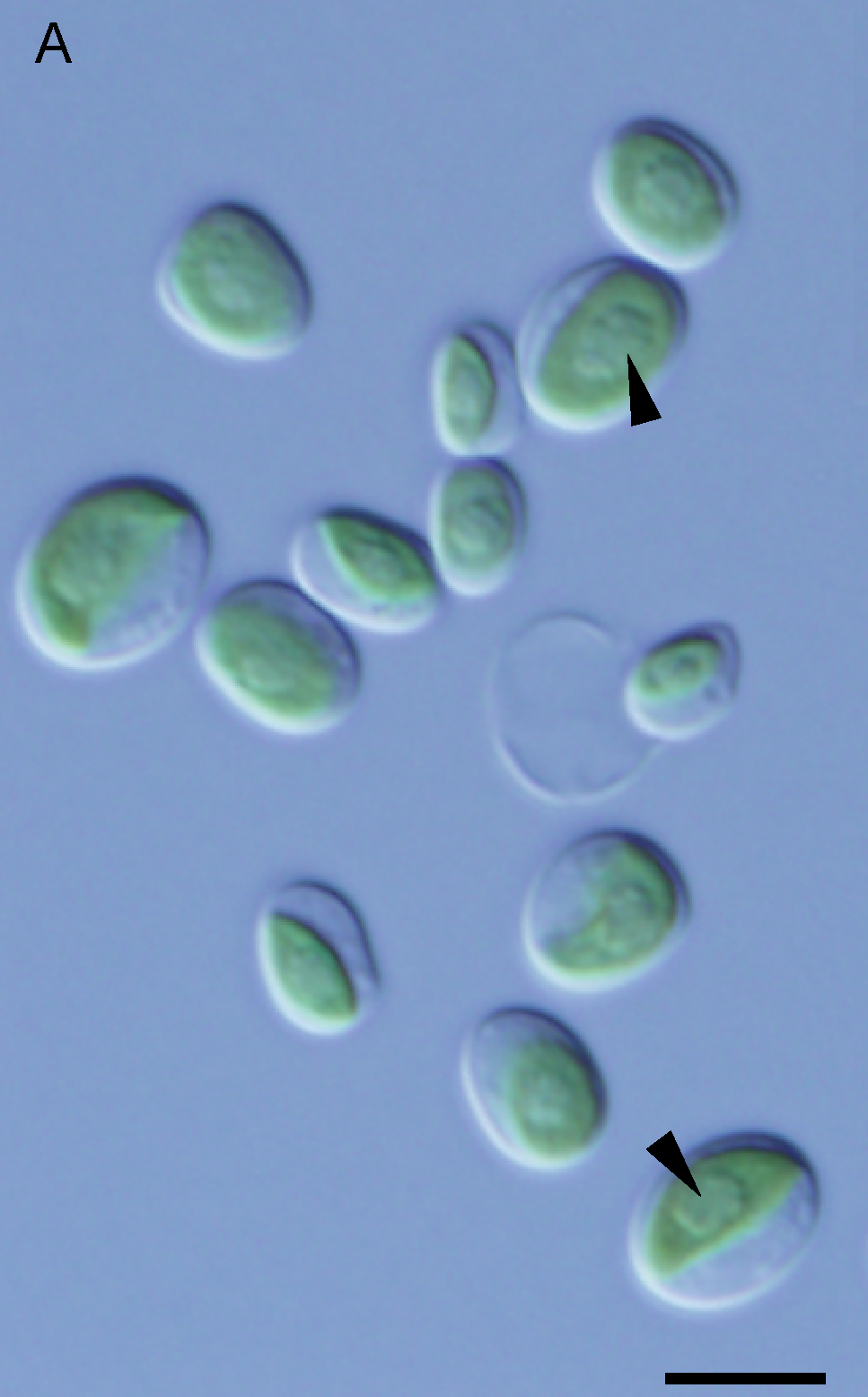
- Pseudochlorella sp.

Scientific classification
- Clade: Viridiplantae
- Division: Chlorophyta
- Class: Trebouxiophyceae
- Order: Prasiolales
- Family: Koliellaceae
- Genus: Pseudochlorella; J.W.G.Lund

Type species
- Pseudochlorella pyrenoidosa (Zeitler) J.W.G.Lund

Species
- See text.

Synonyms
- Pabia Friedl & O'Kelly

= Pseudochlorella =

Genus of algae

Pseudochlorella is a genus of green algae in the family Koliellaceae.

== Species ==
As of September 2022, AlgaeBase accepts three species:

- Pseudochlorella pringsheimii (Shihar & Krauss) Darienko & al.
- Pseudochlorella pyrenoidosa (Zeitler) J.W.G.Lund
- Pseudochlorella signiensis (Friedl & O'Kelly) Darienko & Pröschold
