= Hormidium =

Genus of orchids

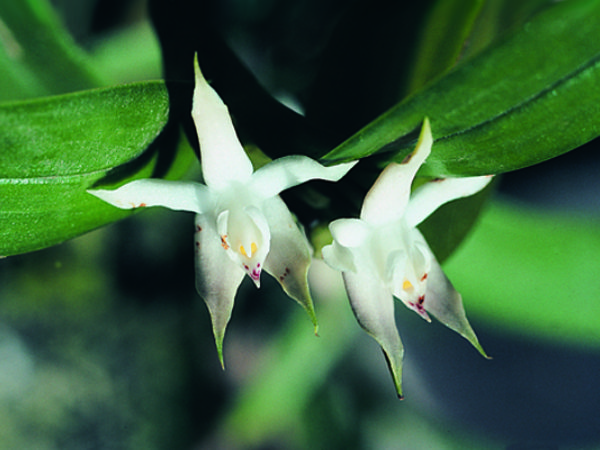
Prosthechea pygmaea, formerly Hormidium pseudopygmaeum

Within the Orchidaceae, Hormidium was originally a subgenus of the genus Epidendrum, but was later raised to a full genus. It is now considered not to be distinct from the genus Prosthechea, of which it is a synonym. Most of the species of Hormidium have been transferred to Prosthechea, although others are now classified in Encyclia, Epidendrum, Homalopetalum, and Lepanthes.

== Taxonomy ==
In 1841, John Lindley used the name Hormidium for one of the subgenera into which he divided the genus Epidendrum. He described the subgenus as having pseudobulbous stems, sessile flowers and with the lip (labellum) of the flower joined (adnate) to the column. Later, in 1861, Heinrich Reichenbach concluded that the subgenus Hormidium was superfluous.

In 1883, George Bentham and Joseph Hooker raised Hormidium to a full genus. They distinguished Hormidium from the other pseudobulbous species of Epidendrum with at least a partially adnate labellum, and specifically mentioned only four species, two of which are now retained in Epidendrum, one which is now placed in Homalopetalum, and one which is now placed in Lepanthes. Because the genus Encyclia features non-adnate labella, and because the genus Prosthechea features labella which are only partially adnate (and therefore do not quite meet Lindley's criteria for Hormidium), Bentham and Hooker's description is useful:

"The plant is a small epiphyte. The pseudobulbs and rhizome are covered with membranaceous sheathes. The pseudobulb bears one or two small leathery or fleshy leaves. The flowers are small (or larger, in the case of Hormidium sophronitis), born on a short raceme. The floral bracts are small. The sepals are of equal lengths, partially closed or completely open, the dorsal sepal free at the rear and the lateral sepals adnate to the base of the column forming a small "ladle". The petals are similar to the sepals or very narrow. The labellum is adnate to the column to its apex with completely erect lamina, either trilobate or lacking any divisions. The column is short with a dilated margin. The clinandrium is short and truncated. The terminal, operculate, slightly kidney-shaped anther leans against the column and carries four pollinia. The flattened egg-shaped pollinia are distinct from each other."

Hormidium is now considered not to be distinct from the genus Prosthechea, of which it is a synonym. Most, but not all, of the former species of Hormidium have been transferred to Prosthechea.

== Species and synonymy ==
The following species have at one time or another been placed in the genus Hormidium but are now placed in different genera:

- H. almasii (Hoehne) Brieger = Prosthechea glumacea
- H. baculibulbum (Schltr.) Brieger = Prosthechea crassilabia
- H. boothianum (Lindl.) Brieger = Prosthechea boothiana
- H. caetense Bicalho = Prosthechea caetensis
- H. calamarium (Lindl.) Brieger = Prosthechea calamaria
- H. coriaceum Brieger = Prosthechea crassilabia
- H. faresianum Bicalho = Prosthechea faresiana
- H. faustum (Rchb.f. ex Cogn.) Brieger = Prosthechea fausta
- H. gilbertoi (Garay) P.Ortiz = Prosthechea gilbertoi
- H. glumaceum (Lindl.) Brieger = Prosthechea glumacea
- H. hioramii Acuna & Roíg = Prosthechea pygmaea
- H. humile (Cogn.) Schltr. = Prosthechea pygmaea
- H. leochilus (Rchb.f.) B.D.Jacks. = Homalopetalum leochilus
- H. miserum (Lindl.) Benth. & Hook.f. ex Hemsl. = Epidendrum miserum
- H. pseudopygmaeum Finet = Prosthechea pseudopygmaea
- H. pulchellum (Sw.) Benth. & Hook.f. ex B.D.Jacks. = Epidendrum miserum
- H. pygmaeum (Hook.) Benth. & Hook.f. ex Hemsl. = Prosthechea pygmaea
- H. racemiferum (Dressler) Withner & P.A.Harding = Prosthechea racemifera
- H. rhynchophorum (A.Rich. & Galeotti) Withner & P.A.Harding = Prosthechea rhynchophora
- H. serpens (Lindl.) Benth. & Hook.f. = Epidendrum serpens
- H. sessiliflorum (Edwall) Pabst, Moutinho & A.V.Pinto = Prosthechea sessiliflora
- H. sophronitis (Linden & Rchb.f.) Benth. & Hook.f. = Epidendrum sophronitis
- H. tripterum (Brongn.) Cogn. = Prosthechea pygmaea
- H. uniflorum (Lindl.) Heynh. = Prosthechea pygmaea
- H. variegatum Brieger = Prosthechea pachysepala
- H. virens Brieger = Prosthechea crassilabia
- H. widgrenii (Lindl.) Brieger = Prosthechea widgrenii
