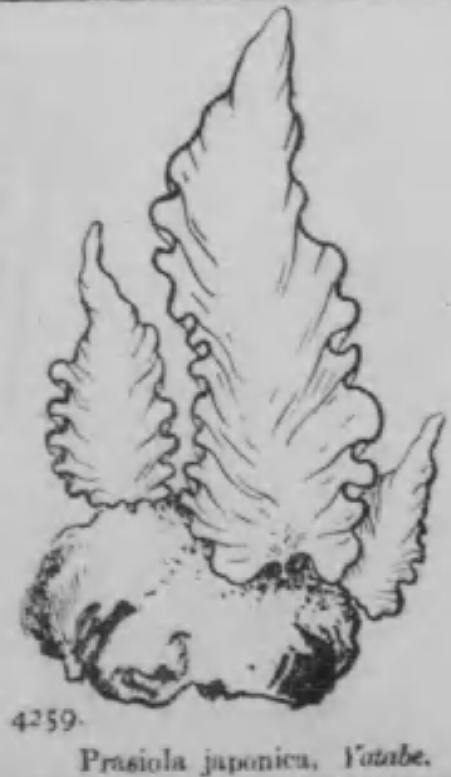
- Prasiola japonica

Scientific classification
- Kingdom: Plantae
- Division: Chlorophyta
- Class: Trebouxiophyceae
- Order: Prasiolales
- Family: Prasiolaceae
- Genus: Prasiola (C.Agardh) Meneghini

Type species
- Prasiola crispa (Lightfoot) Kützing

Species
- See below

= Prasiola =

Genus of algae

Prasiola is a genus of macroscopic green algae, found in a variety of habitats ranging from terrestrial, freshwater, to marine. The genus has a cosmopolitan distribution, ranging from the Arctic to the Antarctic.

Plants belonging to the genus Prasiola were first described by John Lightfoot in 1777 in his series Flora Scotica, as the name Ulva crispa. In 1838, Giuseppe Giovanni Antonio Meneghini circumscribed the genus.

Species of Prasiola are edible and are often harvested for food, particularly Prasiola japonica, in countries such as Japan and Myanmar.

== Description ==
Prasiola forms single-layered blades which may range in shape from fan-shaped, ribbon-shaped, to wedge-shaped and may or may not have a distinct stipe. In some species, plants start as uniseriate, unbranched filaments or thin ribbons. Blades may be attached to a substrate or may be freely floating or lying. Individual cells are quadrangular, and arranged in regular rows, sometimes grouped into blocks of four or eight. Individual cells are uninucleate (with a single nucleus) and contain a star-shaped chloroplast with a single central pyrenoid.

== Reproduction ==
Life history and reproductive strategies of Prasiola differ between species. Asexual reproduction occurs by fragmentation or aplanospores. Sexual reproduction has only been reported in some species, and is oogamous, with flagellated sperm and non-motile egg cells. During sexual reproduction, the thallus may become polystromatic (thicker than one cell). Both male and female gametes may be produced on the same thalli (i.e. are monoecious) or different thalli (i.e. are dioecious).

== Evolution ==
Molecular phylogenetic studies have found that Prasiola is sister to a clade containing the similar genus Rosenvingiella and Rosenvingiellopsis. The genera Prasiola and Rosenvingiella were sometimes considered to be congeneric. The studies have also shown that freshwater and marine species of Prasiola are representatives of a lineage that back-colonized their habitats from a terrestrial ancestor; this is the opposite situation of colonization from sea to land and with few documented examples. Prasiola forms a nearly monophyletic group, but the subaerial alga Prasiococcus was found to be nested within the Prasiola clade.

== Ecology ==
Prasiola species are found in freshwater, marine, and terrestrial habitats. Freshwater species in this genus are common in cold-water streams. Terrestrial species often inhabit soil, rocks, and tree trunks; they are particularly common in nitrogen-rich areas such as guano deposits. Marine species are mostly found in the intertidal or splash zone; each individual plant is small but they usually grow side by side to form a dense green turf on rock surfaces. In areas like Antarctica, Prasiola is one of the most important primary producers.

Marine Prasiola often have the ascomycete fungus Mastodia tessellata (also known as Kohlmeyera complicatula, Turgidosculum complicatulum) growing within their thalli. When the two species grow together, the thalli of Prasiola change in morphology, to becoming olive green and with a rough and convoluted surface. The true nature of their relationship is unclear. It has been variously described as a mycophycobiosis, a lichen-like symbiosis, or a parasitic relationship.

== Species ==
There are about 35 species in the genus.

- Prasiola antarctica
- Prasiola anziana
- Prasiola borealis
- Prasiola calophylla
- Prasiola crispa
- Prasiola cristata
- Prasiola delicata
- Prasiola delicatula
- Prasiola elongata
- Prasiola fangchengensis
- Prasiola filiformis
- Prasiola flotowii
- Prasiola fluviatilis
- Prasiola formosana
- Prasiola furfuracea
- Prasiola glacialis
- Prasiola hubeica
- Prasiola japonica
- Prasiola johanseni
- Prasiola lanpingensis
- Prasiola linearis
- Prasiola mauritiana
- Prasiola meridionalis
- Prasiola mexicana
- Prasiola minuta
- Prasiola nevadensis
- Prasiola novaezelandiae
- Prasiola sinica
- Prasiola skottsbergii
- Prasiola snareana
- Prasiola stipitata
- Prasiola subareolata
- Prasiola tibetica
- Prasiola volcanica
- Prasiola velutina
- Prasiola yunnanica

Traditionally, species were differentiated from each other based on morphological characters, such as the size and shape of the blade and the stipe. However, species delimitation has been problematic due to extensive morphological variability. This has been corroborated by genetic studies, which have found the existence of cryptic species.
