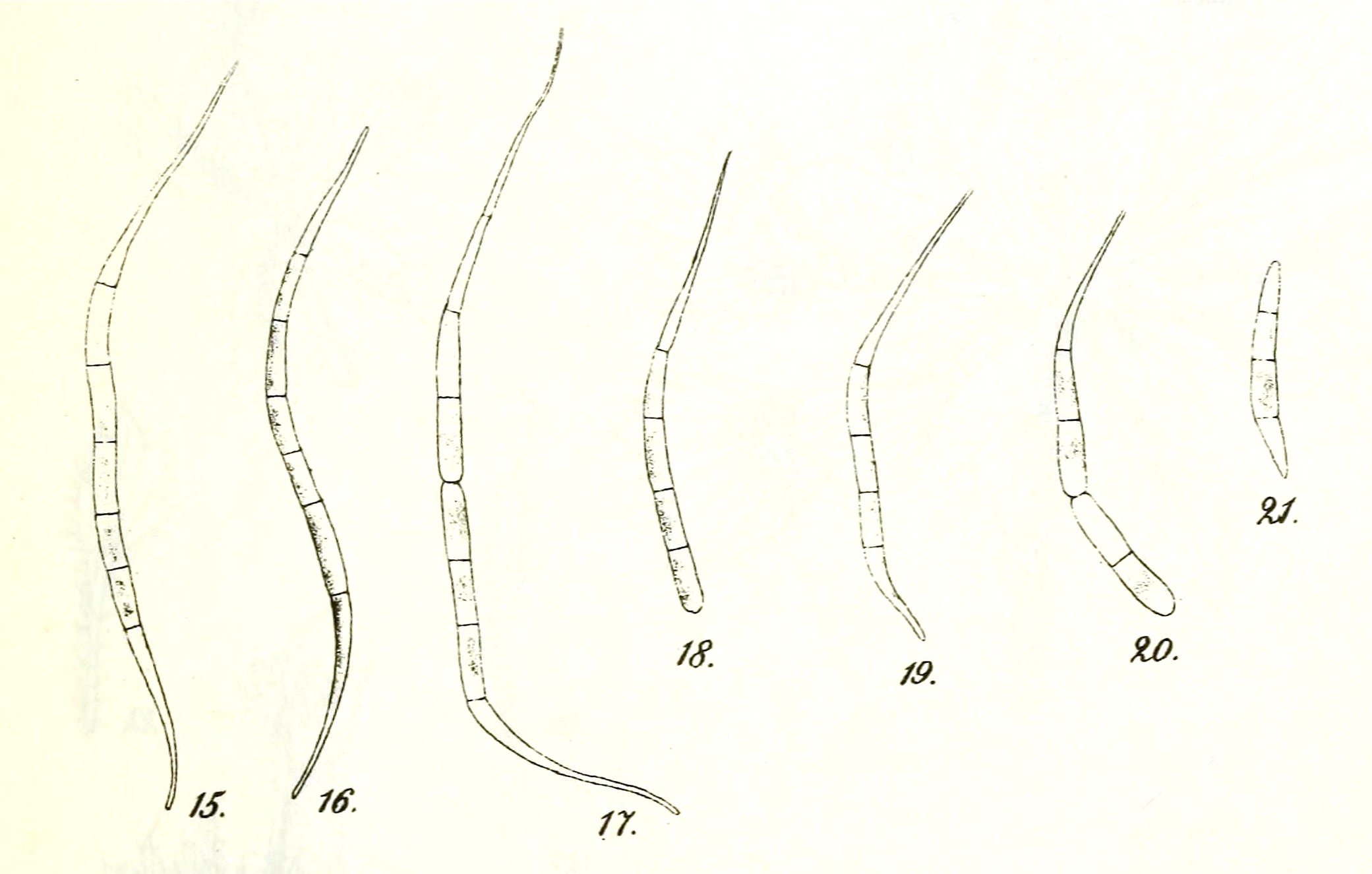
- Raphidonema nivale

Scientific classification
- Clade: Viridiplantae
- Division: Chlorophyta
- Class: Trebouxiophyceae
- Order: Prasiolales
- Family: Koliellaceae
- Genus: Raphidonema; Lagerheim, 1892

Type species
- Raphidonema nivale Lagerheim

Species
- Raphidonema brevirostre; Raphidonema nivale; Raphidonema sempervirens; Raphidonema tatrae; Raphidonema transsylvanica

= Raphidonema (alga) =

Genus of algae

Raphidonema is a genus of filamentous green alga comprising five species. It is a member of the Trebouxiophyceae.

Raphidonema is widely distributed in freshwater habitats, especially snow, where it can impart a green discoloration to the snow.

== Description ==
Raphidonema consists of free-floating filaments of cells, ranging from 2 to 32 cells, which may be straight or slightly curved. Interjacent cells are cylindrical, while cells at the ends taper to a point. The cell membrane is very thin and lacks a mucilaginous sheath. A single chloroplast is present in each cell, girdle- or band-shaped, lacking a pyrenoid. Reproduction occurs asexually via the vegetative division (mitosis) of cells within filaments.

== Taxonomy ==
Raphidonema is similar and closely related to the genus Koliella. Koliella was separated from Raphidonema based on morphology, with Koliella supposedly having cells that separate from each other after division, forming solitary cells. However, some taxonomists do not separate the two taxa, as the difference between the genera is judged to be insufficient for separation. For example, filaments of Raphidonema often separate into single cells akin to Koliella when placed in a liquid medium. Another similar, but poorly studied genus is Raphidonemopsis, which differs from Raphidonema in that its filaments are attached to a substrate.
