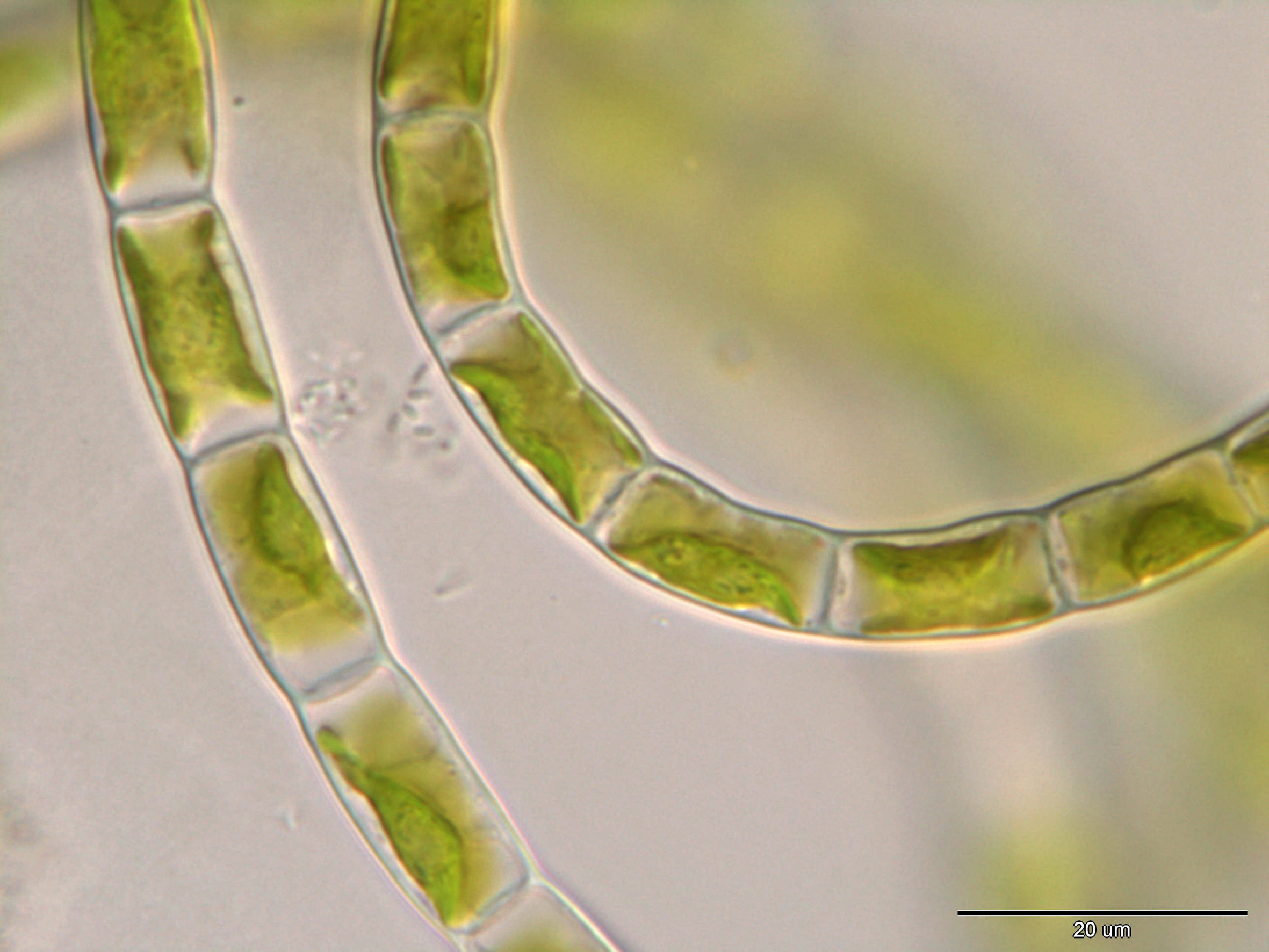
- Klebsormidium bilatum

Scientific classification
- Kingdom: Plantae
- Clade: Streptophyta
- Class: Klebsormidiophyceae
- Order: Klebsormidiales; K.D.Stewart & K.R.Mattox

Families
- Elakatotrichaceae Hindák; Klebsormidiaceae K.D.Stewart & K.R.Mattox

= Klebsormidiales =

Order of algae

Klebsormidiales is an order of charophyte algae. Until Bierenbroodspot et al.'s phylogeny, it was the only order in the class Klebsormidiophyceae, sister of the Phragmoplastophyta. As of February 2022, AlgaeBase accepted two families in the order:

- Elakatotrichaceae Hindák
- Klebsormidiaceae K.D.Stewart & K.R.Mattox

In 2024, Bierenbroodspot et al. emended Klebsormidiophyceae and Klebsormidiales, and described 2 new orders, namely Entransiales and Hormidiellales.
