= Epidendrum serpens =

Scientific classification
- Kingdom: Plantae
- Clade: Tracheophytes
- Clade: Angiosperms
- Clade: Monocots
- Order: Asparagales
- Family: Orchidaceae
- Subfamily: Epidendroideae
- Genus: Epidendrum
- Subgenus: Epidendrum subg. Hormidium
- Species: E. serpens

Binomial name
- Epidendrum serpens Lindl.

Species of orchid

Epidendrum serpens is a sympodial pseudobulbous orchid that grows among lichens on trees near the tree line at altitudes of 1.6-3.5 km in Peru and Ecuador, including the states of Azuay and Pichincha.

== Description ==
The flattened oblong cylindrical pseudobulbs grow to 2 cm long and bear one or two to three leaves. The short, terminal, racemose inflorescence bears three to seven rather large flowers, up to 2 cm across, colored deep violet (Reichenbach) to wine-red (Dodson & Dodson). The lip is heart-shaped where it diverges from the apex of the column, is bolobate at the apex, bears a low keel down the middle, and is slightly fringed on the edge.
