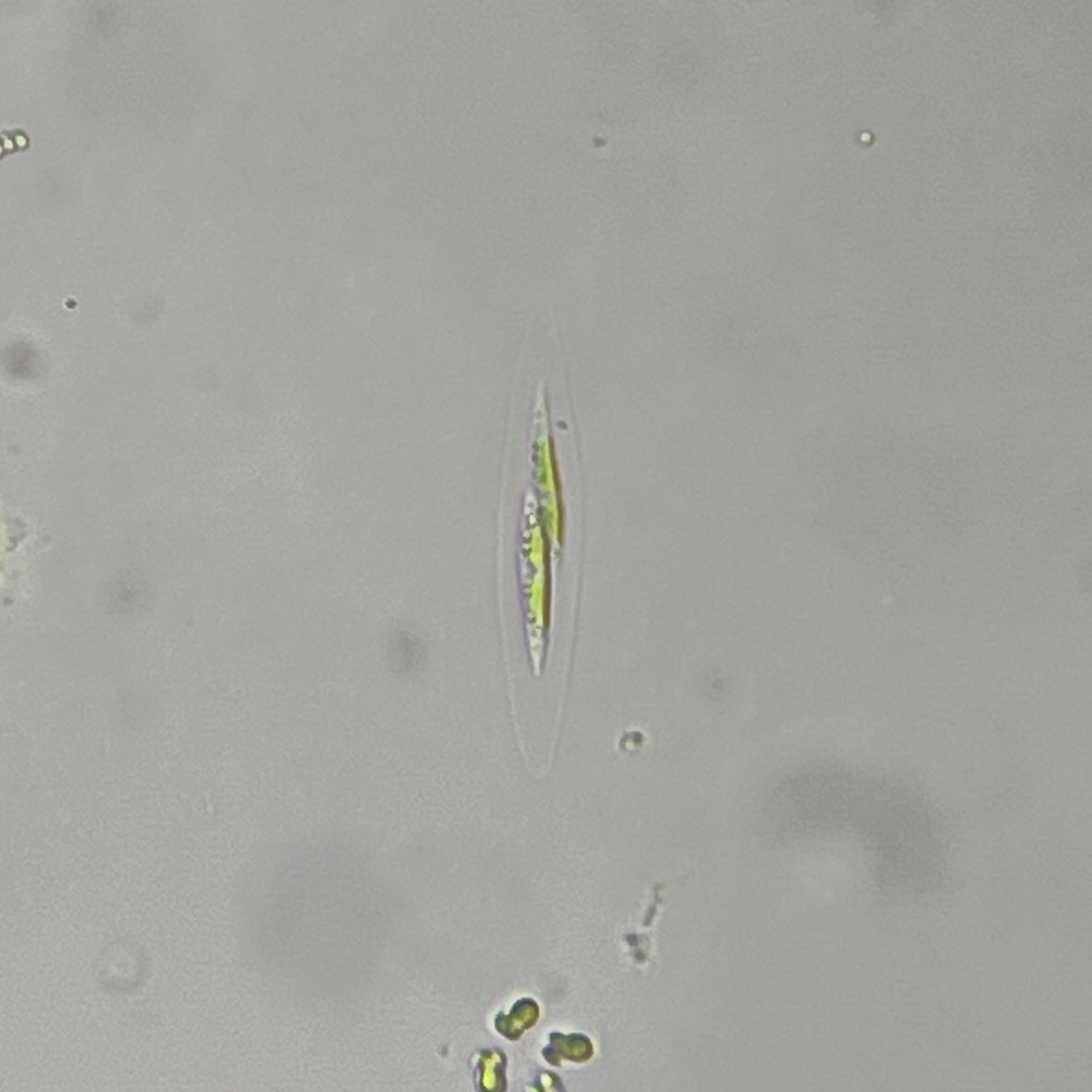
- Elakatothrix genevensis

Scientific classification
- Kingdom: Plantae
- Class: Klebsormidiophyceae
- Order: Klebsormidiales
- Family: Elakatotrichaceae
- Genus: Elakatothrix; Wille, 1898

Type species
- Elakatothrix gelatinosa Wille, 1898

Species
- See text

= Elakatothrix =

Genus of algae

Elakatothrix is a genus of green algae in the class Klebsormidiophyceae.

== Etymology ==
Genus name Elakatothrix is composed of elakato- prefix, "spindle", and –thrix suffix, "thread", literally "spindle thread", in reference to the tapered shape of individual cell of the colonial algae.

== List of species ==
- E. auae Setchell 1924
- E. acuta Pascher 1915
- E. alpina Beck-Mannagetta 1926
- E. americana Wille 1899
- E. arvernensis Chodat & Chodat 1925
- E. bifurcata Kant & Gupta 1998
- E. biplex (Nygaard 1945) Hindák 1962
- E. gelatinosa Wille 1898
- E. gelifacta (Chodat 1902) Hindák 1987
- E. genevensis (Reverdin 1919) Hindák 1962
- E. gloeocystiformis Korshikov 1953
- E. gracilis Hortobagyi 1973
- E. inflexa Hindák 1966
- E. lacustris Korshikov 1953 non Beck-Mannagetta 1931
- E. linearis Pascher 1915
- E. minima Beck-Mannagetta 1929
- E. obtusata Flechtner, Johansen & Clark 1998
- E. ovalis (Ettl 1968) Hindák 1987
- E. parvula (Archer 1862) Hindák 1962
- E. pseudogelatinosa Korshikov 1953
- E. spirochroma (Reverdin 1917) Hindák 1962
- E. subacuta Korshikov 1939
