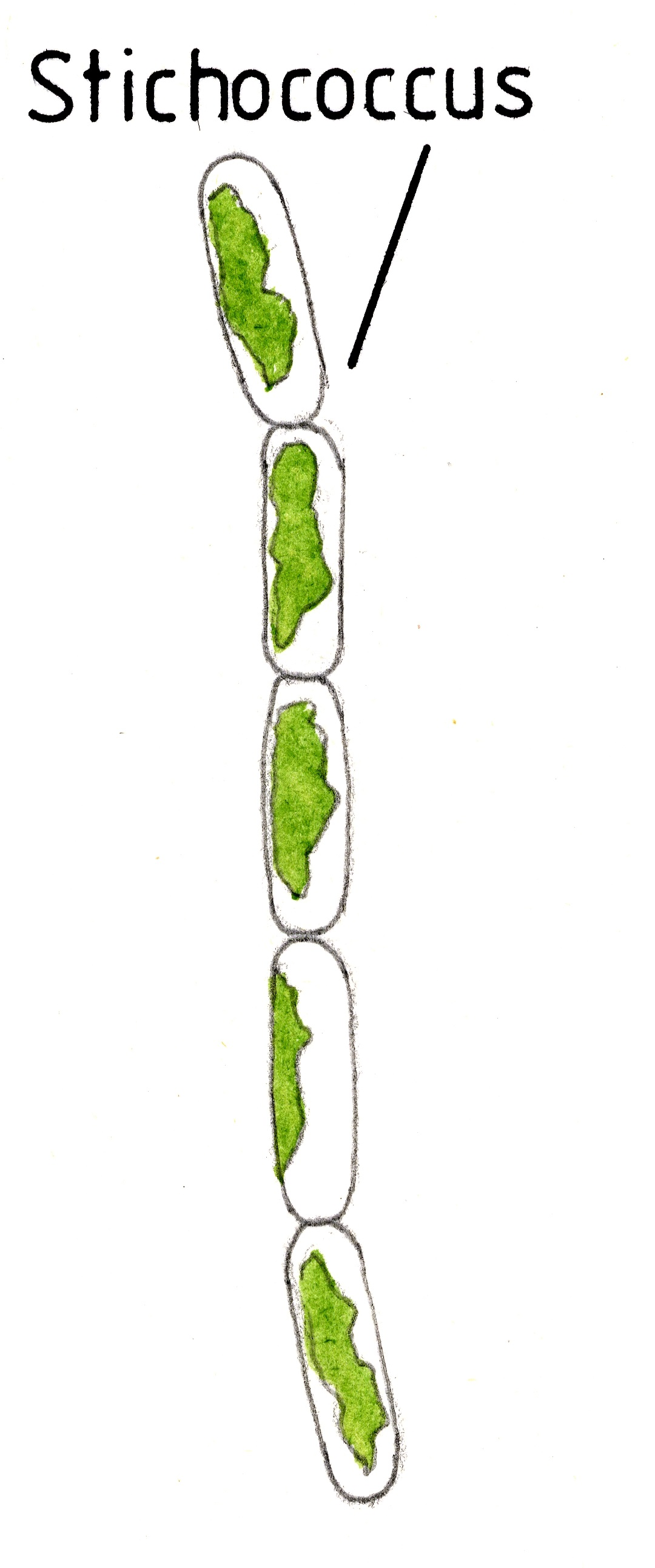

Scientific classification
- Kingdom: Plantae
- Division: Chlorophyta
- Class: Trebouxiophyceae
- Order: Prasiolales
- Family: Stichococcaceae
- Genus: Stichococcus; Nägeli

Species
- S. bacillaris; S. ampulliformis; S. sp. NB2VFF10; S. chlorelloides; S. sp. BCP-SRS2-14; S. sp. MBIC10457; S. sp. MBIC10465; S. deasonii; S. jenerensis; S. thannithode

= Stichococcus =

Genus of algae

Stichococcus is a genus of green algae in the family Stichococcaceae. It is a very common algal genus found in a variety of habitats, such as tree trunks, soil, snow, freshwater and marine habitats. One species, Stichococcus bacillaris is economically important as it produces fatty acids useful for biofuels.

The name Stichococcus originates from the Ancient Greek στίχος (stíkhos, "row, line") and κόκκος (kókkos, "seed" or "berry").

== Description ==
Stichococcus consists of solitary cells or uniseriate filaments of few cells (2 to 4) that readily break apart. The cells are cylindrical, about three times longer than wide, straight or sometimes curved, with rounded ends often containing vacuoles. Cells are uninucleate with one thin, parietal chloroplast with or without a pyrenoid. Pyrenoids if present are located in the middle of the chloroplast but usually difficult to see. Reproduction occurs by vegetative cell division, and by the fragmentation of filaments.

== Taxonomy ==
Stichococcus is placed within the order Prasiolales, equivalent to the Prasiola-clade found in literature. The morphological form of Stichococcus is not monophyletic, and therefore in 2020 it was split into several genera: Protostichococcus, Deuterostichococcus, Tritostichococcus, Tetratostichococcus, and Pseudostichococcus. The similar morphology of all of these genera and species makes identification using morphology difficult or even impossible. Stichococcus and its relatives produce sorbitol and sucrose as an osmolyte, when subjected to salt stress.
