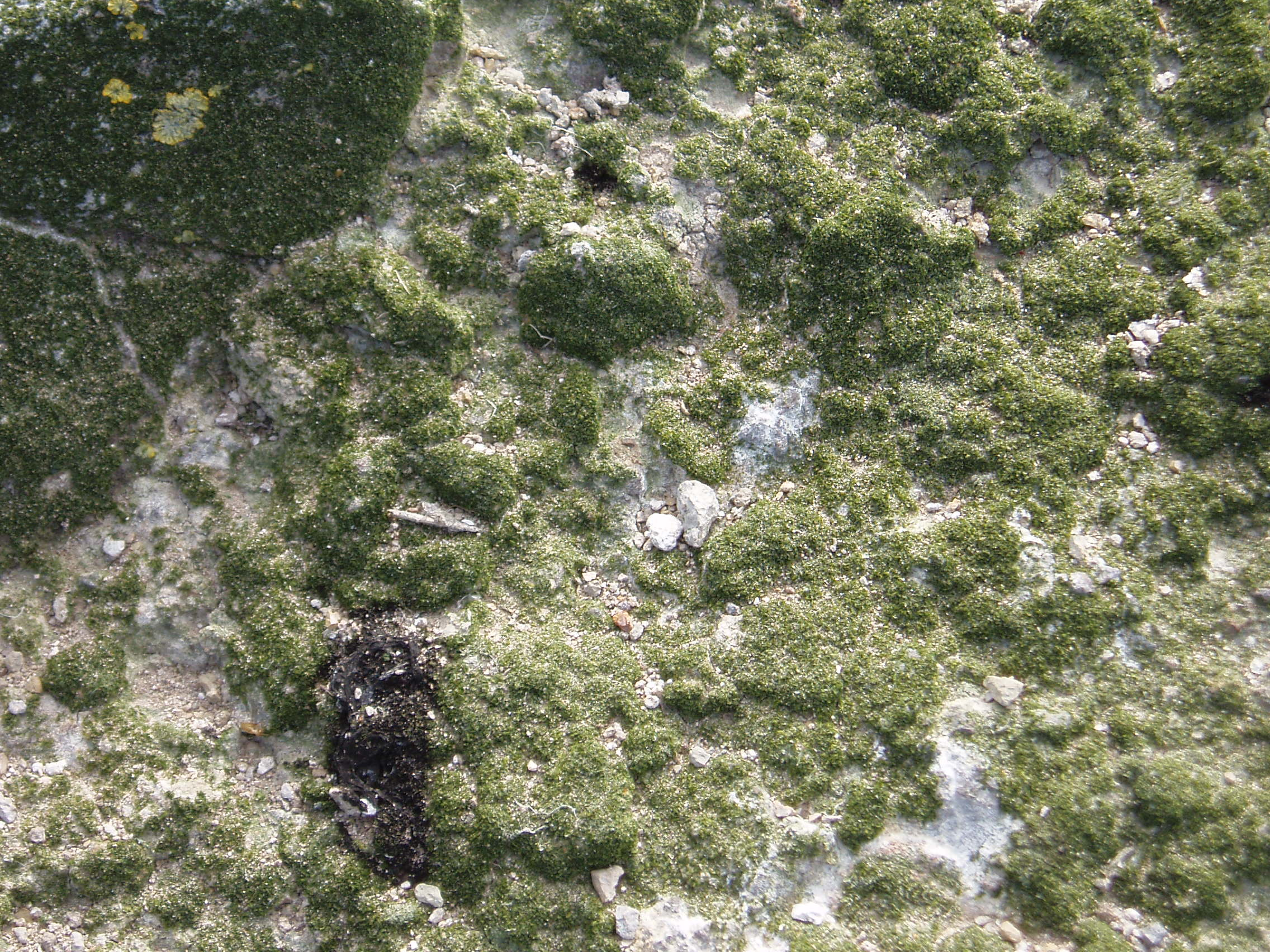
- Prasiola stipitata

Scientific classification
- Kingdom: Plantae
- Division: Chlorophyta
- Class: Trebouxiophyceae
- Order: Prasiolales
- Family: Prasiolaceae; F.F.Blackman & A.G.Tansley

Genera
- Prasiococcus; Prasiola; Prasiolopsis; Prasionella; Prasionema; Rosenvingiella; Rosenvingiellopsis; Schizogonium

= Prasiolaceae =

Family of algae

Prasiolaceae is a family of green algae in the order Prasiolales. Members of this family are found in freshwater, terrestrial, and marine habitats.

Algae in the family Prasiolaceae consist of thalli with blades a single cell thick (i.e. monostromatic). Vegetative cells are polygonal with two to four cells arranged within a parent cell wall. Each cell has a single, stellate chloroplast and a central pyrenoid.

Traditionally, it was the only family in the order Prasiolales. However, molecular phylogenetics have shown that additional algae with simple morphologies, such as Stichococcus, also belong to the same clade as this family.

== Phylogeny ==
Molecular phylogenetic studies suggest the following relationships:

- - - - Prasiola + Prasiococcus
      - - Rosenvingiella
        - Rosenvingiellopsis
    - - Prasionema
      - Prasionella
  - Prasiolopsis

Another, older study places Prasionella as sister to Rosenvingiella. The above cladogram excludes the genus Schizogonium, which is taxonomically problematic and likely a synonym of Rosenvingiella.
