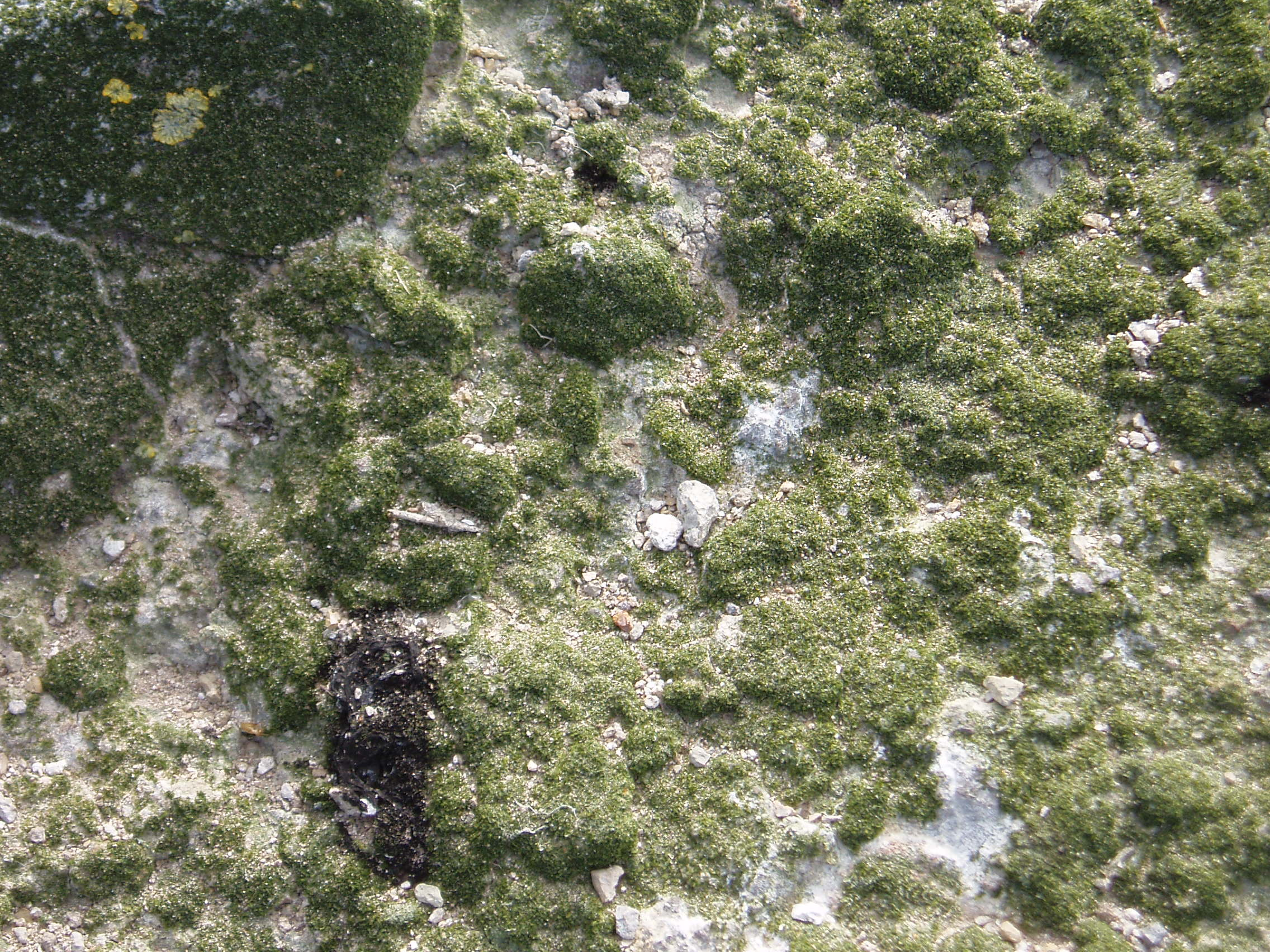
- Prasiola stipitata

Scientific classification
- Kingdom: Plantae
- Division: Chlorophyta
- Class: Trebouxiophyceae
- Order: Prasiolales; F.E.Fritsch

Families
- Koliellaceae; Prasiolaceae; Stichococcaceae

= Prasiolales =

Order of algae

Prasiolales is an order of green algae in the class Trebouxiophyceae. Members of this order are ecologically widespread and are found in freshwater, marine, and terrestrial habitats from the Arctic to the Antarctic.

Morphological features include a single stellate, axial chloroplast with a central pyrenoid. The ultrastructure of Prasiolales is unique and includes cells with four flagella, with their basal flagellar apparatuses in a counterclockwise orientation. For a long time, its placement was uncertain and debated between Ulvophyceae and Trebouxiophyceae (also known as Pleurastrophyceae). Molecular data, however, have robustly supported its placement in the latter class.

Traditionally the order contained a single family, Prasiolaceae. Molecular phylogenetics studies have found that coccoid algae of very simple morphology, such as Stichococcus, also belong to this order.

Genera of uncertain placement to family include:

- Edaphochlorella
- Pseudomarvania

== Phylogeny ==
Molecular phylogenetic studies have shown the following relationships (not all genera are included):

- Prasiolales
  - - - - - - Raphidonema/Koliella pro parte
            - Pseudochlorella
          - Raphidonema/Koliella pro parte
        - Ekerewekia
      - Gloeocystis polydermatica
    - Edaphochlorella (syn. Chlorella mirabilis)
  - - - - - - Prasiolaceae
            - Pseudomarvania
          - - Stichococcus
            - Desmococcus
        - - Protostichococcus
          - - Deuterostichococcus
            - Tritostichococcus
      - - Diplosphaera
        - Tetratostichococcus
    - Pseudostichococcus
