= Chlorococcales =

Order of algae

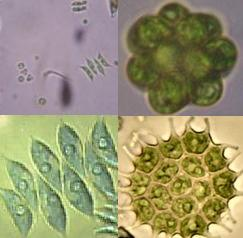
Various algae, formerly classified within Chlorococcales

Chlorococcales is a formerly recognized order of green algae in the class Chlorophyceae. As of February 2022, the type family Chlorococcaceae was placed in the order Chlamydomonadales.

Conventionally, many groups of coccoid green algae were lumped in the order Chlorococcales sensu lato by Komárek & Fott (1983), based on Pascher's (1918) idea of establishing orders according to life forms. However, coccoid green algae are currently placed in several orders of Chlorophyceae, Trebouxiophyceae, Ulvophyceae (e.g., Chlorocystis) and Prasinophyceae within the division Chlorophyta, or in the division Charophyta (e.g., Chlorokybales, Desmidiales).

== Families ==
According to Komárek & Fott (1983):

- Chlorococcaceae (Chlorococcoideae, Spongiococcoideae)
- Palmellaceae (Hormotiloideae, Palmelloideae, Neochloridoideae, Chlorosarcinoideae)
- Chlorochytriaceae
- Dicranochaetaceae
- Characiaceae (Fernandinelloideae, Characioideae, Schroederioideae)
- Treubariaceae
- Golenkiniaceae
- Hydrodictyaceae
- Micractiniaceae
- Botryococcaceae (Dictyosphaerioideae, Ecballocystoideae, Botryococcoideae)
- Radiococcoideae (Radiococcoideae, Disporoideae, Dictyochlorelloideae, Palmodictyoideae)
- Oocystaceae (Lagerheimiodeae, Oocystoideae, Eremosphaeroideae, Glaucocystoideae)
- Chlorellaceae (Siderocelidoideae, Chlorelloideae, Ankistrodesmoideae, Tetraedronoideae, Scotielloideae)
- Coelastraceae
- Scenedesmaceae (Coronastroideae, Danubioideae, Crucigenioideae, Tetrallantoideae, Scenedesmoideae, Dimorphococcoideae)

According to Smith (1938):

- Chlorococcaceae
- Endosphaeraceae
- Characiaceae
- Protosiphonaceae
- Hydrodictyaceae
- Oöcystaceae
- Scenedesmaceae

== Bibliography ==
- Komarék, J.; Fott, B. 1983. Chlorophyceae (Grünalgen), Ordnung: Chlorococcales, In: Huber-Pestalozzi, G., (Ed), Das Phytoplankton des Susswasers; Systematik und Biologie. Stuttgart, E. Schweizerbart’sche Verlagsbuchhhandlung, Bd 7, fasc. 1, 1044p.
