= Dicloster =

Scientific classification
- Domain: Eukaryota
- Clade: Archaeplastida
- Clade: Viridiplantae
- Division: Chlorophyta
- Class: Trebouxiophyceae
- Order: Chlorellales
- Family: Chlorellaceae
- Genus: Dicloster; C.-C.Jao, Y.S.Wei & H.C.Hu
- Species: D. acuatus

Binomial name
- Dicloster acuatus C.-C.Jao, Y.S.Wei & H.C.Hu

Genus of algae

Dicloster is a genus of green algae in the family Chlorellaceae, containing the sole species Dicloster acuatus. It is found in freshwater habitats as plankton, and is distributed around the world.

Dicloster acuatus is a colonial alga, consisting of coenobia of two or four cells, attached at their centers (in four-celled colonies, the two pairs of cells are arranged in different levels). Cells are 30–60 μm long and 3–9 μm wide, narrowly crescent-shaped, with narrowly tapering apices, pointing away from the center. Cells are embedded in a mucilaginous matrix. The cell wall is smooth. Cells contain a single nucleus with a single, parietal chloroplast and up to five (typically one or two) pyrenoids).

Reproduction occurs asexually by the formation of autospores, with each cell forming up to four coenobia. Sexual reproduction or zoospores have not been recorded from this genus.

Because of its coenobial morphology resembling genera such as Scenedesmus or Selenastrum, it has been placed in the families Scenedesmaceae and Selenastraceae at points. However, analysis of 18S ribosomal RNA and ITS2 sequences have shown that it is more closely related to genera such as Parachlorella in the family Chlorellaceae.
