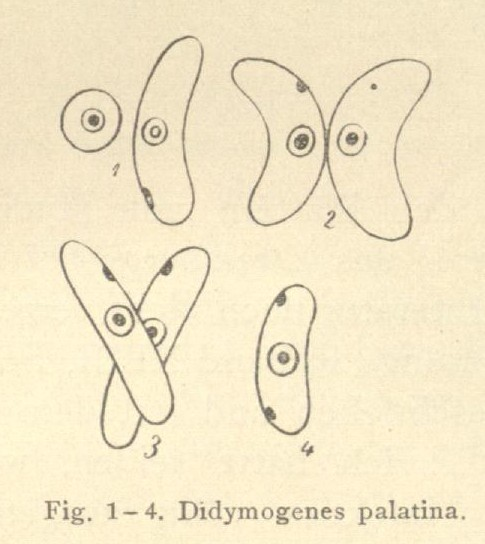
- Didymogenes palatina

Scientific classification
- Kingdom: Plantae
- Division: Chlorophyta
- Class: Trebouxiophyceae
- Order: Chlorellales
- Family: Chlorellaceae
- Genus: Didymogenes; Schmidle, 1905

Type species
- Didymogenes palatina Schmidle

Species
- Didymogenes anomala; Didymogenes granulata; Didymogenes palatina; Didymogenes soliella; Didymogenes sphaerica

= Didymogenes =

Genus of algae

Didymogenes is a genus of microscopic green algae in the class Trebouxiophyceae. It is a planktonic species found in freshwater habitats worldwide. Formerly placed in the family Scenedesmaceae, molecular studies have placed it in the family Chlorellaceae.

== Description ==
Didymogenes consists of colonies of two or four cells, termed coenobia, which may sometimes be united to form compound coenobia (syncoenobia). Cells are attached to each other by their centers, arranged parallel or crosswise. The cells are curved or sigmoid, 4–18 μm long, with apices rounded. The cell walls are smooth or with granules, or with bristles. Inside the cells are a single nucleus and a single parietal chloroplast with a pyrenoid. The ultrastructure of the bristles are similar to that of the closely related Micractinium.

In 2013, two additional species of Didymogenes, D. soliella and D. sphaerica, were described. The morphologies of these two species are dissimilar from Didymogenes as traditionally defined, and are similar to Chlorella, consisting of solitary, spherical cells. Their placement in Didymogenes is based on molecular data.

Reproduction occurs asexually via the formation of autospores, arranged into coenobia. The autospores are released by the rupture of the parent cell wall, and daughter cells may have remnants of the cell walls attached. Sexual reproduction or zoospores have not been observed in this genus.
