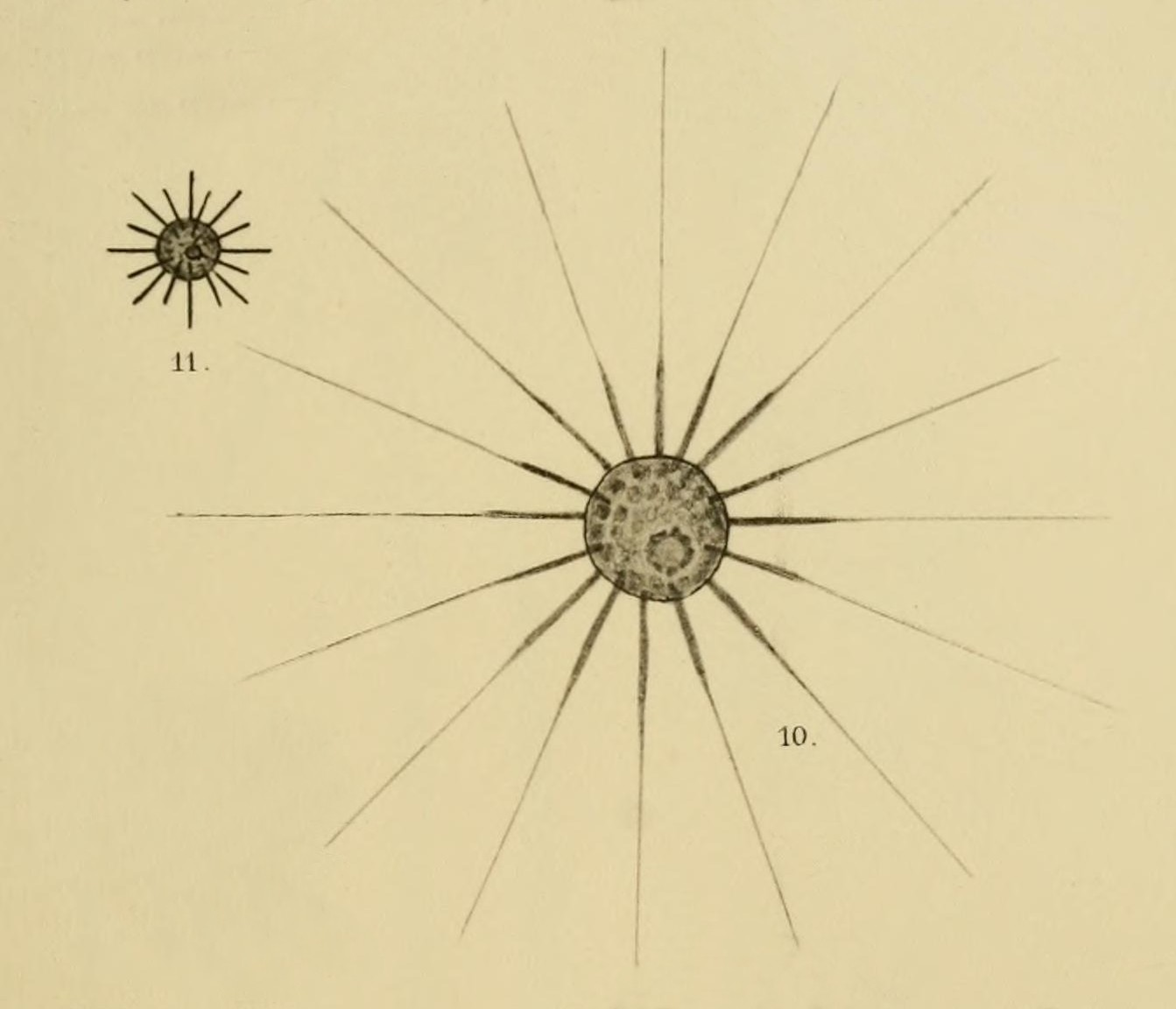

Scientific classification
- Clade: Viridiplantae
- Division: Chlorophyta
- Class: Trebouxiophyceae
- Order: Chlorellales
- Family: Chlorellaceae
- Genus: Acanthosphaera; Lemmermann
- Species: A. zacharaisii

Binomial name
- Acanthosphaera zacharaisii Lemmermann, 1899

Synonyms
- Acanthosphaera tenuispina Korshikov

= Acanthosphaera =

Genus of algae

Acanthosphaera is a genus of green algae, in the family Chlorellaceae. It contains the sole species Acanthosphaera zachariasii, although some sources list a second species, Acanthosphaera tenuissima. It is widely distributed, in freshwater habitats and exists as phytoplankton.

Acanthosphaera consists of solitary, free-living planktonic cells. The cell is spherical, about 8–15 μm in diameter and uniformly covered in 20–40 spines. The spines are distinctly thickened at the base, and very narrow at the tips. The spines are organized in four whorls of 4, 8, 8, and 4 respectively. Cells contain a single nucleus and one parietal, cup-shaped chloroplast, which has a single, prominent pyrenoid with a starch sheath.

Asexual reproduction occurs by the formation of two, four or eight zoospores, released via the rupture of the parental cell wall. Zoospores as having two flagella, are ovoid and often have two stigmata and four contractile vacuoles. The original author Korshikov described the presence of 4-flagellate zoospores, but this has not been confirmed in subsequent reports. Sexual reproduction has not been observed in this genus.
