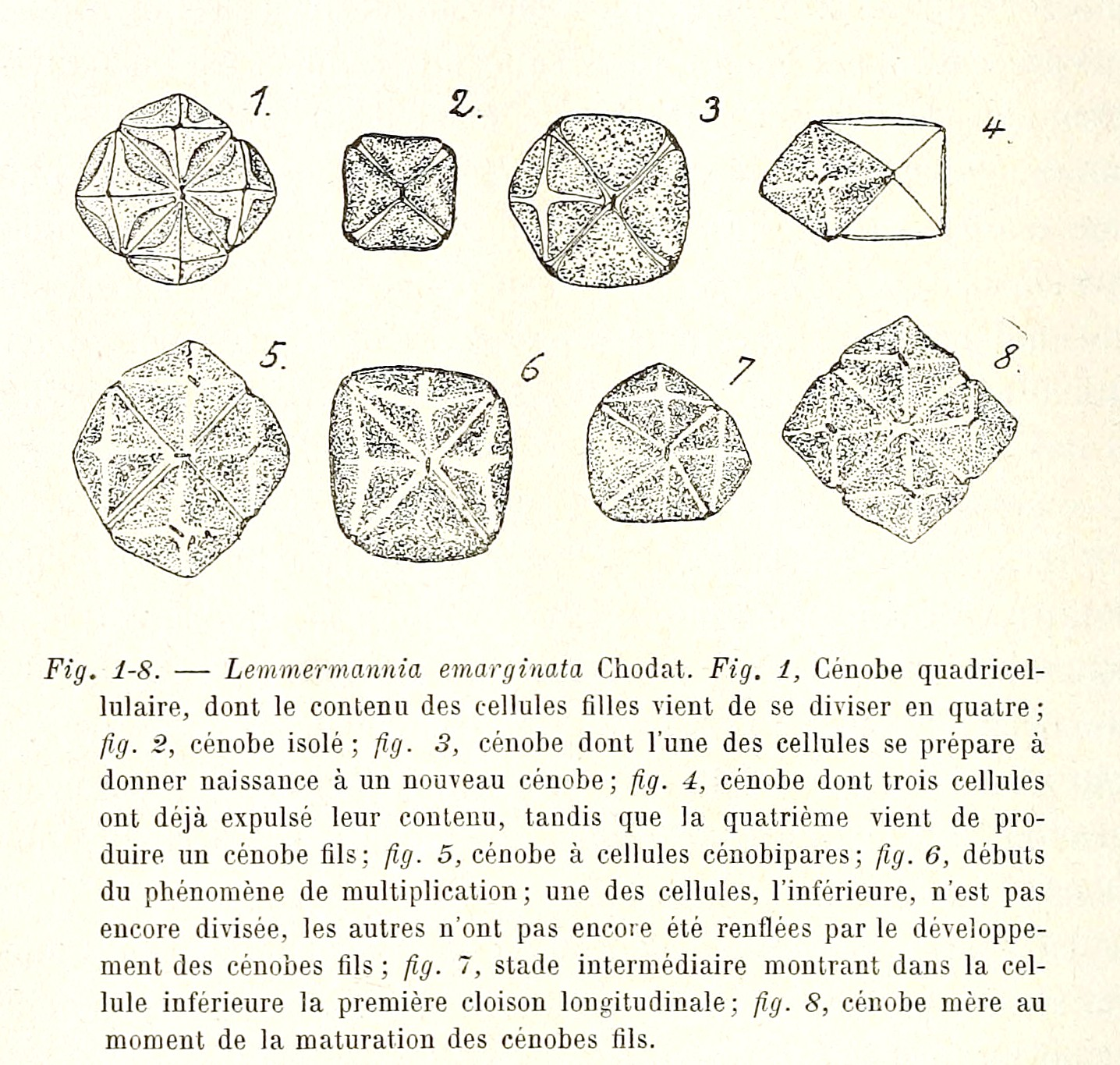

Scientific classification
- Domain: Eukaryota
- Clade: Archaeplastida
- Clade: Viridiplantae
- Division: Chlorophyta
- Class: Trebouxiophyceae
- Order: incertae sedis
- Family: incertae sedis
- Genus: Lemmermannia; Chodat, 1900

Type species
- Lemmermannia tetrapedia (Kirchner) Lemmermann

Species
- See text.

= Lemmermannia =

Genus of algae

Lemmermannia /ˌlɛməɹˈmæniə/ is a genus of fresh water trebouxiophyceans. as of March 2022, the genus contains five described species. They form coenobia of 4 to 16 cells. Its type species is L. tetrapedia (Kirchner) Lemmermann, originally described in 1880 but put into the genus Lemmermannia in 1904.

== Etymology ==
The genus is named in honor of German botanist Ernst Johann Lemmermann.

== History ==
In 1880, Kirchner described Staurogenia tetrapedia.

In 1897, Schröder described Tetrapedia emarginata

In 1898, Kuntze moved Staurogenia tetrapedia to the genus Crucigenia, in the name Crucigenia tetrapedia.

In 1900, Chodat described the genus Lemmermannia and used T. emarginata (now L. emarginata) as the type of the new genus.

In 1904, Lemmermann moved Crucigenia tetrapedia into Lemmermannia as Lemmermannia tetrapedia, which was not widely recognized; the old name Crucigenia tetrapedia was kept in use. The genus Lemmermannia had been ignored for many years until 2013.

In 2013, Bock et al. found a new clade of algae including Crucigenia tetrapedia and three others using molecular methods. Bock et al. (2013) decided that Crucigenia tetrapedia and Lemmermannia emarginata are the same organism. Since C. tetrapedia was described first (in 1880) and has priority, it is the species name that should be used. The type of Lemmermannia thus changed its name, from L. emarginata to L. tetrapedia (Kirchner) Lemmermann 1904. Three other species formerly in the genus Tetrastrum were added to Lemmermannia.

== Morphology ==
Lemmermannia includes triangular or oval green, planktonic algae that mostly form tightly joined square coenobia of 4 cells, with or without small rectangular opening in the centre. L. komarekii make coenobia of up to 16 cells in the form of near-square synceonobia, where 4 tetrads join together. The cells have a single plastid, with or without a small pyrenoid. All species lack spines, and mostly have smooth cell walls, with or without convexity. A minority of L. punctata individuals, as well as old empty cells of the species, have granules on the outer cell walls.

== Metabolism ==
Lemmermannia tetrapedia can use hypoxanthine and allantoin as the only nitrogen source for photosynthesis, which indicates that eukaryotic algae share similar purine degradation pathway to higher plants, animals, and fungi.

== Reproduction ==
Lemmermannia perform asexual reproduction (autosporation by sporangium); sexual reproduction has not been observed.

Lemmermannia species perform two types of reproduction: L. tetrapedia exhibits Crucigenia-type of autosporation where the daughter coenobium rotates 45˚ relative to the cell wall of the mother coenobium; the other four species produce daughter coenobia in the same orientation as the mother coenobia. This demonstrates that in this taxon a Crucigenia-type of autosporation should not be used as a generic character.

== Phylogeny ==
Molecular phylogenies based on the SSU rDNA and ITS rRNA genes show Lemmermannia to be a sister clade to Botryococcus in Trebouxiophyceae.

== Species ==
As of March 2022, AlgaeBase accepted five species:

- Lemmermannia emarginata (Schröder) Chodat
- Lemmermannia komarekii (Hindák) C.Bock & Krienitz
- Lemmermannia punctata (Schmidle) C.Bock & Krienitz
- Lemmermannia tetrapedia (Kirchner) Lemmermann
- Lemmermannia triangularis (Chodat) C.Bock & Krienitz

== Habitat ==
All species inhabit freshwater around the globe.

L. tetrapedia has been reported highly susceptible to heavy metals in water.
