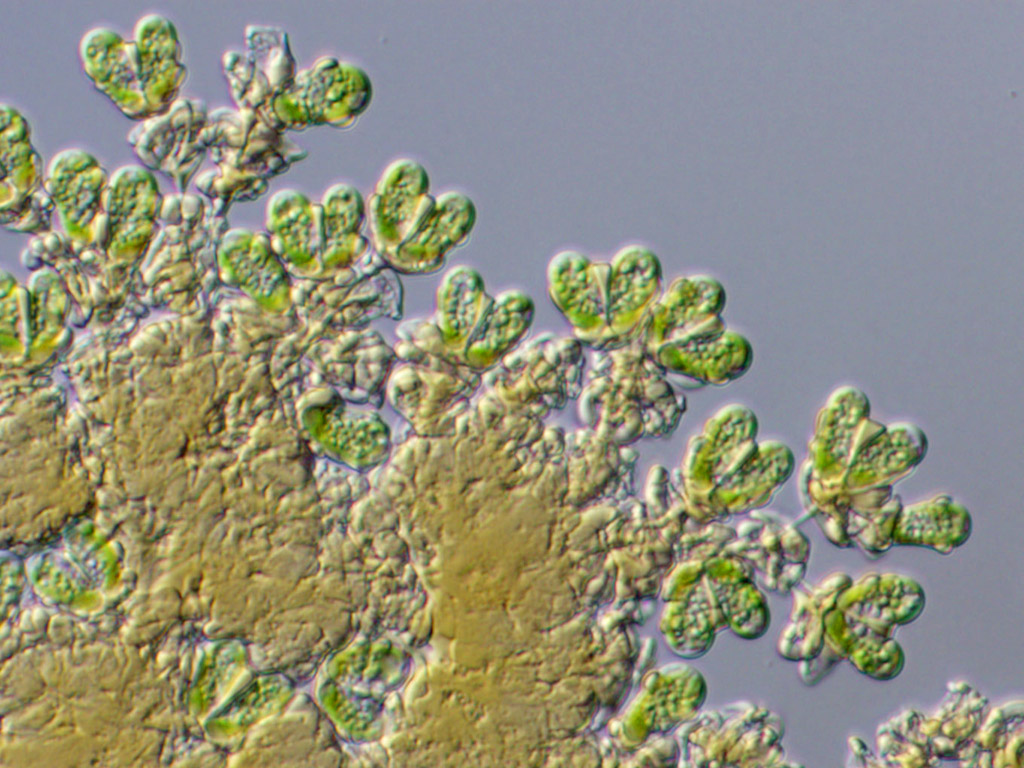
- Botryococcus braunii

Scientific classification
- Kingdom: Plantae
- Division: Chlorophyta
- Class: Trebouxiophyceae
- Order: Trebouxiales
- Family: Botryococcaceae; Wille, 1909

Genera
- Botryococcus; Caulodendron; Dichotomococcus; Selenodictyon

= Botryococcaceae =

Family of algae

Botryococcaceae is a family of green algae in the class Trebouxiophyceae.

Traditionally, Botryococcaceae has been defined on morphological grounds. Members of this family consist of irregular colonies of cells found free-floating or attached to a substrate. Cells are united by mucilaginous stalks that are formed by the gelatinization of the old parent cell walls. Cells may be spherical, ellipsoidal, or ovoid with a chloroplast with or without a pyrenoid. Reproduction occurs exclusively asexually by the formation of autospores. However, molecular phylogenetic studies have found that some genera placed in Botryococcaceae based on morphology alone are unrelated to Botryococcus; the genus Dictyosphaerium is now placed in the family Chlorellaceae.
