= Muriella =

Scientific classification
- Kingdom: Plantae
- Division: Chlorophyta
- Class: Trebouxiophyceae
- Order: Chlorellales
- Family: Chlorellaceae
- Genus: Muriella; J.B.Petersen

Species
- Muriella zofingiensis; Muriella terrestris; Muriella sp. AS 2-4

Genus of algae

Muriella is a genus of green algae in the class Trebouxiophyceae. It is named after Muriel Bristol.
