= Dimorphococcopsis =

Scientific classification
- Clade: Viridiplantae
- Division: Chlorophyta
- Class: Trebouxiophyceae
- Order: incertae sedis
- Family: Dictyosphaeriaceae
- Genus: Dimorphococcopsis; C.-C.Jao
- Species: D. fritschii

Binomial name
- Dimorphococcopsis fritschii Crow) C.-C.Jao

Genus of algae

Dimorphococcopsis is a genus of green algae, in the family Dictyosphaeriaceae. As of February 2022, the only species is Dimorphococcopsis fritschii.
