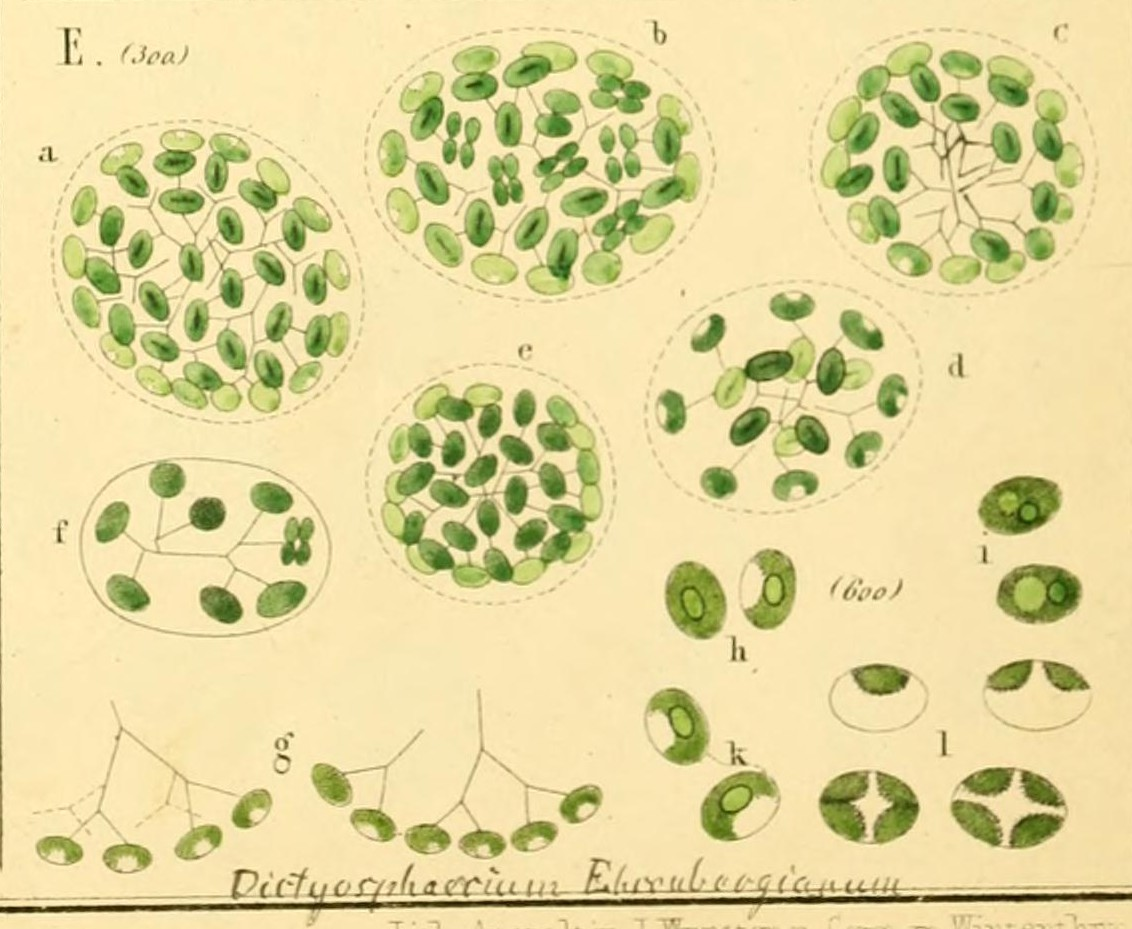

Scientific classification
- Clade: Viridiplantae
- Division: Chlorophyta
- Class: Trebouxiophyceae
- Order: Chlorellales
- Family: Chlorellaceae
- Genus: Dictyosphaerium; Nägeli, 1849

Type species
- Dictyosphaerium ehrenbergianum Nägeli

Species
- Dictyosphaerium coacervatum; Dictyosphaerium ehrenbergianum; Dictyosphaerium granulatum; Dictyosphaerium indicum; Dictyosphaerium lacustre; Dictyosphaerium libertatis; Dictyosphaerium planctonicum; Dictyosphaerium primarium; Dictyosphaerium reniforme; Dictyosphaerium simplex; Dictyosphaerium subsolitarium; Dictyosphaerium terrestre

= Dictyosphaerium =

Genus of algae

Dictyosphaerium is a genus of green algae, in the family Chlorellaceae. It occurs in freshwater habitats around the world and is planktonic. The name comes from the Greek roots diktyon, meaning "net", and sphaira, meaning "ball", referring to its morphology.

== Description ==
Dictyosphaerium consists of irregular colonies of 4 to 64 cells in a common mucilaginous envelope 10–100 μm wide. Cells are roughly spherical to ellipsoidal, 1-10 μm in diameter, with one nucleus and a single pyrenoid-containing chloroplast. Cells are attached to the end of thin stalks; the stalks emerge from the center of the colony and continuously branch out. These stalks are formed from the remnants of the mother cell wall.

Dictyosphaerium cells reproduce asexually by autospores. Two or four autospores are produced per sporangium; after release, the mother cell wall gelatinizes and develops into a thin strand, which are connected to the newly released cells.

== Taxonomy ==
Dictyosphaerium has traditionally been classified in its own family, Dictyosphaeriaceae, or as part of the family Botryococcaceae, characterized by cells connected by gelatinous stalks or strands of mucilage. However, molecular phylogenetic studies have demonstrated that Dictyosphaerium is closely related to the unicellular genus Chlorella, and is now currently placed in the family Chlorellaceae.

Additionally, the morphotype of Dictyosphaerium (consisting of branching strands of mucilage connecting cells) is known to be polyphyletic, having evolved multiple times. Therefore, this morphotype can now be found in many new genera. For example, the genus Mucidosphaerium differs from Dictyosphaerium sensu stricto in having spherical cells, as opposed to Dictyosphaerium with oval cells. The genus Mychonastes (including the former genus Pseudodictyosphaerium) differs in having chloroplasts without pyrenoids, and more irregular mucilaginous strands.

Other similar genera include Compactochlorella, Kalenjinia, Marasphaerium, Masaia, Hindakia, Heynigia, and Xerochlorella. These genera appear to be more or less cryptic, being reliably differentiated only by DNA barcoding. Their biogeographical patterns remain unclear.
