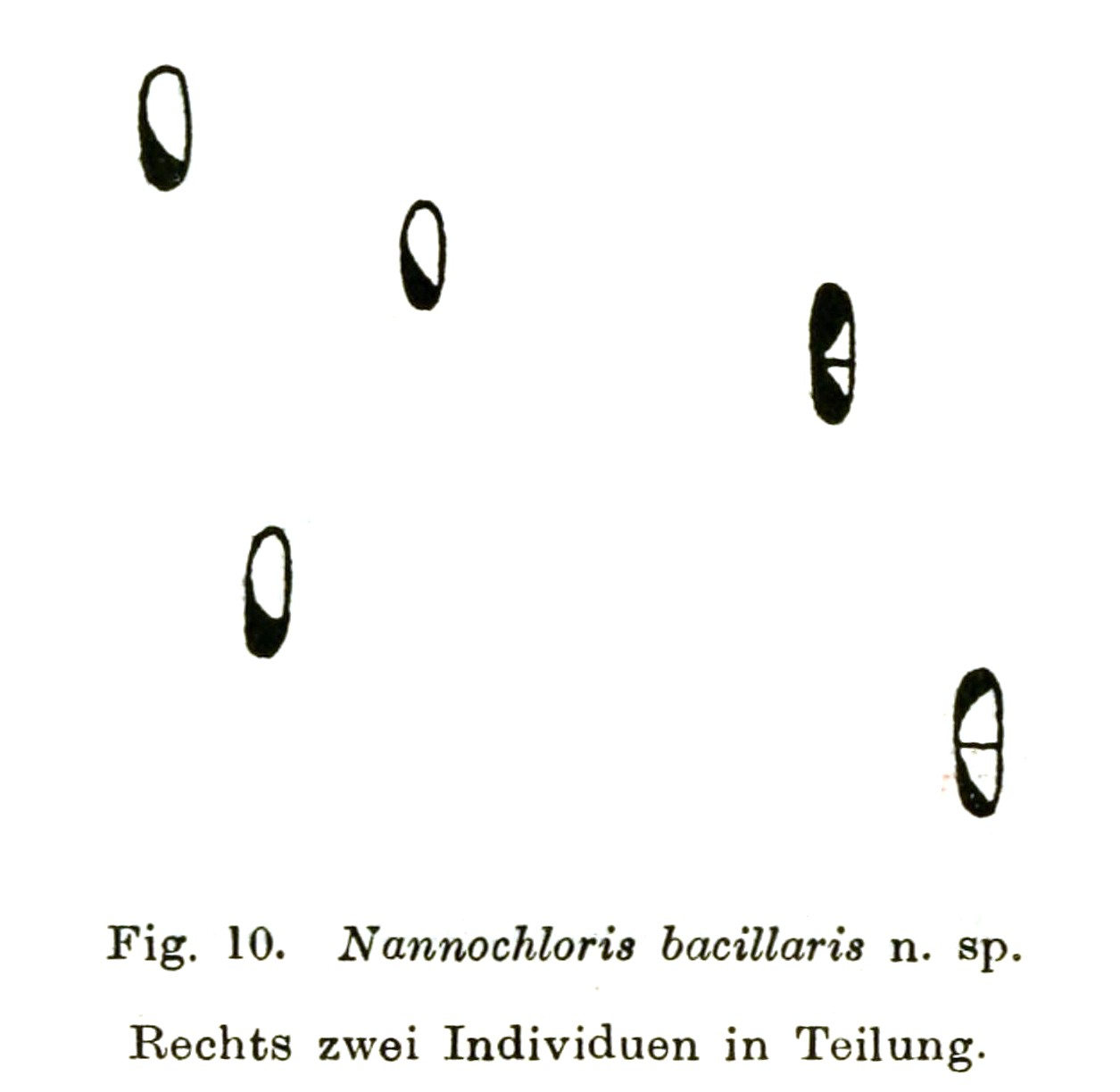
- Nannochloris bacillaris

Scientific classification
- Clade: Viridiplantae
- Division: Chlorophyta
- Class: Trebouxiophyceae
- Order: Chlorellales
- Family: Chlorellaceae
- Genus: Nannochloris; Naumann, 1921

Species
- Nannochloris bacillaris; Nannochloris normandinae

= Nannochloris =

Genus of algae

Nannochloris is a genus of green algae in the family Chlorellaceae. It is found in freshwater habitats.

Nannochloris consists of very small cells less than 4.5 μm in diameter. The cells are solitary or paired, subspherical to subcylindrical, and surrounded by layers of mucilage and often found in large groups. The single chloroplast is parietal and plate-like, at one or both ends, and with one naked pyrenoid.
