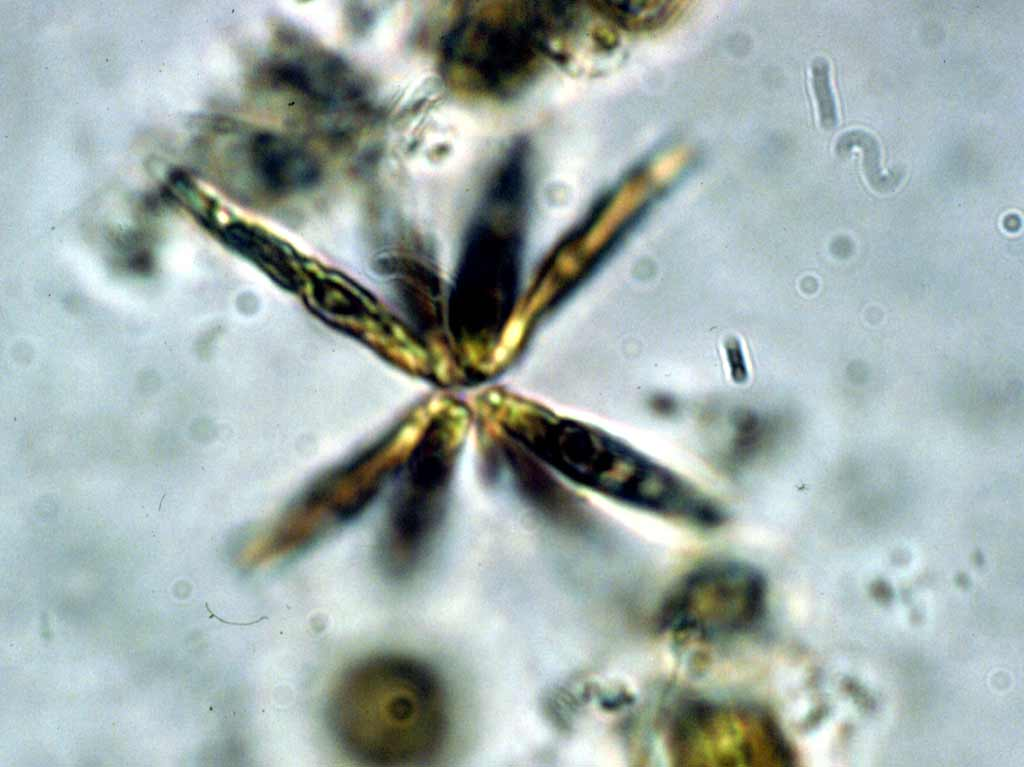
- Actinastrum hantzschii

Scientific classification
- Kingdom: Plantae
- Division: Chlorophyta
- Class: Trebouxiophyceae
- Order: Chlorellales
- Family: Chlorellaceae
- Genus: Actinastrum; Lagerheim, 1882

Type species
- Actinastrum hantzschii Lagerheim

Species
- See below

= Actinastrum =

Genus of algae

Actinastrum is a genus of freshwater green algae. It was first described by Gustaf Lagerheim in 1882. Members of the genus are commonly found in eutrophic freshwater ponds and lakes, and have a cosmopolitan distribution.

Traditionally, Actinastrum was placed within the family Coelastraceae based on morphology (spherical, three-dimensional colonies and reproduction by autospores). However, molecular phylogenetic studies have shown that the type species Actinastrum hantzschii is closely related to Chlorella, another autospore-forming genus in the family Chlorellaceae.

== Description ==
Actinastrum consists of eight (sometimes two, four or 16) cells, which are attached together at a common point to form a star-shaped colony, termed a coenobium. The colonies are often aggregated to form compound coenobia. Cells are 7–40 μm long and 1–8 μm wide, much longer than broad, and are cylindrical, cigar-shaped, or pointed. The cell wall is smooth, thin, and not thickened. Cells are uninucleate (with a single nucleus) and a contain a single chloroplast, which is elongated, parietal and contains a single pyrenoid.

Actinastrum reproduces asexually, by forming 4-16 autospores usually arranged into a coenobium. The first protoplast division occurs transversely, the second perpendicular to it, and the third occurs along the long axis of the cell. Spores are released by the dissolution of the parental cell wall. Sexual reproduction has not been observed in this genus.

== Species ==
As of 2025, AlgaeBase accepts ten species, including one fossil species:

- Actinastrum aciculare
- †Actinastrum bansaense
- Actinastrum cerastioides
- Actinastrum fluviatile
- Actinastrum gracillimum
- Actinastrum hantzschii
- Actinastrum mixtum
- Actinastrum schroeteri
- Actinastrum subcornutum
- Actinastrum tetaniforme

Species in Actinastrum are distinguished based on the overall shape of the cells. However, the genus is very morphologically, and the cell shape changes considerably during its life cycle and in response to external conditions.
