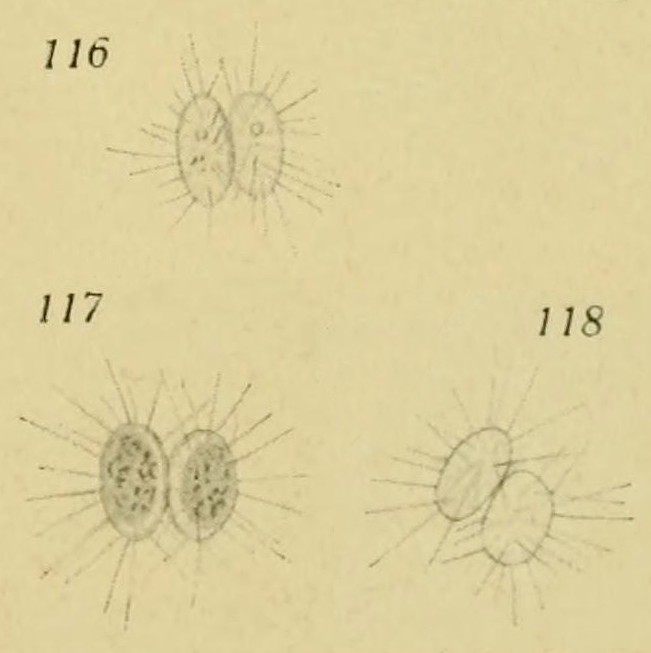
- Dicellula geminata

Scientific classification
- Clade: Viridiplantae
- Division: Chlorophyta
- Class: Trebouxiophyceae
- Order: Chlorellales
- Family: Chlorellaceae
- Genus: Dicellula; Svirenko, 1926
- Species: D. geminata

Binomial name
- Dicellula geminata (Printz) Korshikov

Synonyms
- Dicellula planctonica; Franceia geminata; Franceia tuberculata

= Dicellula =

Genus of algae

Dicellula is a genus of green algae in the family Chlorellaceae. It contains a single species, Dicellula geminata. It occurs in the plankton of eutrophic fresh water. It is distributed around the world, but uncommon.

Dicellula geminata consists mostly of 2-celled (occasionally 4-celled or single-celled) coenobia. The cells are oval to long-oval, about 8–22 × 5–12 μm, attached side-by-side. The cell wall is covered in delicate bristles up to 20 μm long, often with brownish incrustations at the base of each bristle. Cells are uninucleate (with one nucleus), with two (sometimes one or up to eight) chloroplasts each containing a single pyrenoid.

Asexual reproduction occurs by the formation of autospores arranged into coenobia; they are released by the gelatinization of the parental cell wall. Sexual reproduction or zoospores have not been reported from this genus.
