= Lithoglypha =

Scientific classification
- Domain: Eukaryota
- Kingdom: Fungi
- Division: Ascomycota
- Class: Lecanoromycetes
- Order: Acarosporales
- Family: Acarosporaceae
- Genus: Lithoglypha; Brusse (1988)
- Species: L. aggregata

Binomial name
- Lithoglypha aggregata Brusse (1988)

Genus of fungi

Lithoglypha is a fungal genus in the family Acarosporaceae. It is monotypic, containing the single species Lithoglypha aggregata, a saxicolous (rock-dwelling), crustose lichen found in South Africa.

== Taxonomy ==
Both the genus and species were proposed in 1988 by the lichenologist Franklin Andrej Brusse in 1988. The genus name is derived from the Greek roots lithos ("rock") and glyphe (referring to writing or engraving on a stone tablet). The lichen is only known to occur in the Clarens Formation of South Africa.

== Description ==
The genus Lithoglypha is characterised by a thallus that is endolithic, meaning it grows within the interior of rocks, presenting a crustose (crust-like) appearance. The algae associated with Lithoglypha belong to the order Chlorococcales.

The apothecia (fruiting bodies) of Lithoglypha initially develop in a cleistotheciform (closed) manner, later transforming into a pseudolecideine form, which indicates a transition in their developmental stages. The excipulum, or the outer layer of the apothecium, has a dark reddish-brown colouration and is prosoplectenchymatous (composed of tightly interwoven cells) at the base, becoming paraplectenchymatous (with loosely interwoven cells) towards the top. The epithecium, the uppermost layer above the hymenium, also dark reddish-brown, is paraplectenchymatous and tends to become evanescent, leaving remnants only along the edges of the hymenium, which is the fertile, spore-producing layer. The hypothecium, the tissue below the hymenium, is interspersed, adding to the structural complexity of the apothecia.

The hymenium itself is hyaline (translucent) and varies in height from 50 to 100 μm, displaying a reaction that turns from blue to wine-red upon the addition of iodine, a diagnostic feature in identifying lichen species. Paraphyses within the hymenium are septate (segmented), cylindrical, and can be either simple or branched, contributing to the overall structure and function of the reproductive apparatus. Asci, the spore-bearing cells, are clavate (club-shaped) with a tholus (the thicker, central part) that may not react (J-) or turn pale blue with iodine, while the external gel reacts positively (J+), turning blue or wine-red.

Lithoglypha produces a large number of ascospores, typically more than 100, which are hyaline, ellipsoid, simple, and small, measuring 2–8 by 1–3 μm. Pycnidia, asexual reproductive structures, are either spherical or pear-shaped, with a diameter of about 150 μm. The spore-bearing filaments within, known as pycnidiosporophores, are hyaline, cylindrical, and can be either simple or branched. The pycnidiospores, produced at the tips of these filaments, are acrogenous (formed at the apex) and resemble hyaline needles, measuring 4–8 by 0.8 μm.
