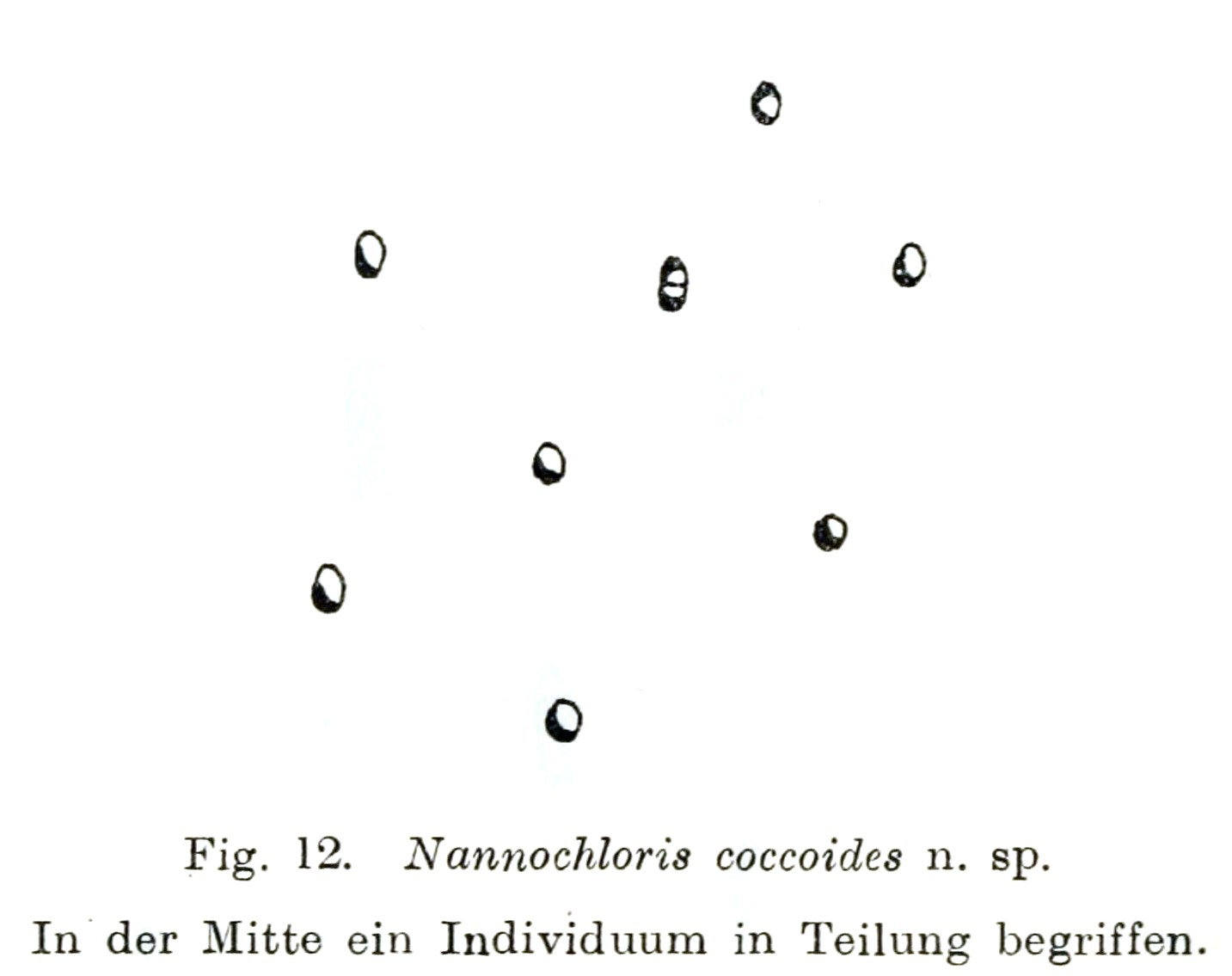
- Marvania coccoides

Scientific classification
- Kingdom: Plantae
- Division: Chlorophyta
- Class: Trebouxiophyceae
- Order: Chlorellales
- Family: Chlorellaceae
- Genus: Marvania; F.Hindák

Species
- Marvania geminata; Marvania coccoides; Marvania sp. JL 11-11

= Marvania =

Genus of algae

Marvania is a genus of green algae in the family Chlorellaceae.

The genus name of Marvania is in honour of Petr Marvan (1929–2022), who was a Czech botanist (algology, mycology and lichenology), and hydrobiologist who worked at the Water Research Institute.

The genus was circumscribed by František Hindák in Arch. Hydrobiol. Suppl. vol.49 on page 268 in 1976.
