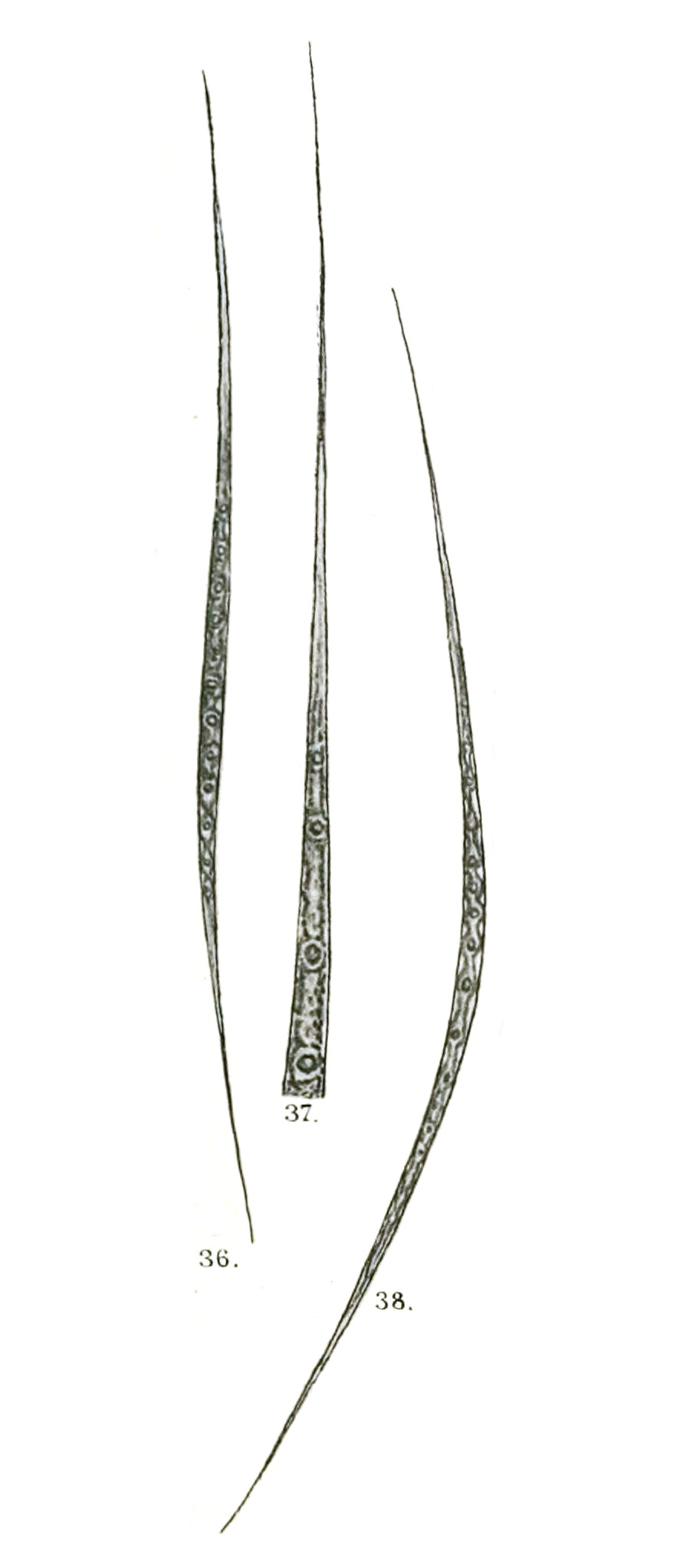
- Closteriopsis longissima

Scientific classification
- Kingdom: Plantae
- Division: Chlorophyta
- Class: Trebouxiophyceae
- Order: Chlorellales
- Family: Chlorellaceae
- Genus: Closteriopsis; Lemmermann, 1899

Type species
- Closteriopsis longissima (Lemmermann) Lemmermann

Species
- Closteriopsis acicularis

= Closteriopsis =

Genus of algae

Closteriopsis is a genus of green algae in the family Chlorellaceae. It is planktonic in freshwater habitats, and is widespread.

Closteriopsis is currently placed in the family Chlorellaceae, based on molecular data, although it is similar in morphology to Selenastraceae and was formerly placed there.

== Description ==
Closteriopsis is a unicellular organism. Cells are 10–240 μm long and 1–6.5 μm wide, and are very long and narrow, either straight or curved with usually pointed tips. Most sources describe Closteriopsis as lacking a mucilaginous envelope, although it has been documented in one species. Cells have smooth cell walls, a single nucleus and a central or parietal, ribbon-like chloroplast with multiple pyrenoids arranged in a series. Reproduction occurs asexually by the formation of two to eight autospores, which form in a series and are released through the rupture of the parental cell wall. Flagellated stages and sexual reproduction have not been observed in this genus.

Closteriopsis is similar to other narrow, spindle-shaped organisms such as Keratococcus, Schroederia and Monoraphidium, and differs from them in having multiple pyrenoids per chloroplast. It is also similar to some acicular species of Closterium (hence the name), from which it is distinguished by having only one chloroplast and reproducing by autospores. Species are distinguished from each other based on chloroplast morphology and cell size and shape.
