= Dactylosphaerium =

Scientific classification
- Clade: Viridiplantae
- Division: Chlorophyta
- Class: Trebouxiophyceae
- Order: incertae sedis
- Family: Dictyosphaeriaceae
- Genus: Dactylosphaerium; Steinecke, 1916

Type species
- Dactylosphaerium sociale

Species
- Dactylosphaerium ellipsoideum Behre; Dactylosphaerium granulatum Krienitz; Dactylosphaerium jurisii Hindák; Dactylosphaerium sociale Steinecke

Genus of algae

Dactylosphaerium is a genus of green algae, in the class Trebouxiophyceae.
