= Micractiniaceae =

Scientific classification
- Domain: Eukaryota
- Clade: Archaeplastida
- Clade: Viridiplantae
- Division: Chlorophyta
- Class: Trebouxiophyceae
- Order: incertae sedis
- Family: Micractiniaceae; G.M.Smith, 1950

Genera
- See text.

Family of algae

Micractiniaceae is a family of green algae in the class Trebouxiophyceae. As of February 2022, AlgaeBase placed only the genus Phythelios in this family, and not the type genus Micractinium.
