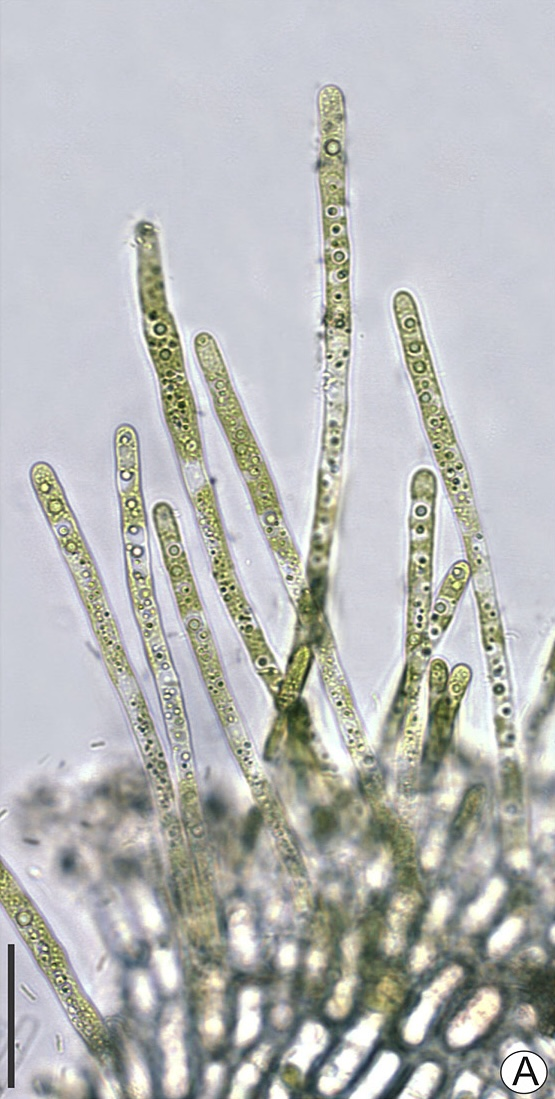
- Rhopalosolen cylindricus

Scientific classification
- Clade: Viridiplantae
- Division: Chlorophyta
- Class: Trebouxiophyceae
- Order: incertae sedis
- Family: incertae sedis
- Genus: Rhopalosolen; Fott, 1957

Type species
- Rhopalosolen cylindricus (F.D.Lambert) Fott

Species
- Rhopalosolen cylindricus (F.D.Lambert) Fott; Rhopalosolen saccatus (Filarsky) Fott; Rhopalosolen sebestyeniae Fott

= Rhopalosolen =

Genus of algae

Rhopalosolen is a genus of green algae in the class Trebouxiophyceae. It is found in freshwater habitats, and is epizoic or epiphytic on various substrates such as rotifers, nematodes, cladocerans, copepods, fungal hyphae, plants, or other algae.

== Description ==
Rhopalosolen consists of singular cells attached to a substrate. The cells are cylindrical or club-shaped, about 80–430 μm long and 10–45 μm wide when mature, somewhat tapered at the base and broadly rounded at the apex. At the base, the cells are attached to the substrate via a mucilaginous pad. Cells contain a single chloroplast lining the inside of the cell; the chloroplast is initially plate-like but may become dissected with age, and divide into multiple pieces during reproduction. Multiple pyrenoids are present. Adult cells are coenocytic, with multiple nuclei. Species are distinguished from each other based on the size and shape of the cells.

Reproduction occurs asexually and sexually. In asexual reproduction, biflagellate zoospores are produced that escape through a tear in the mother cell wall near the apex. Sexual reproduction has been observed in the type species, R. cylindricus, and is anisogamous.
