= Parachlorella =

Scientific classification
- Kingdom: Plantae
- Division: Chlorophyta
- Class: Trebouxiophyceae
- Order: Chlorellales
- Family: Chlorellaceae
- Genus: Parachlorella; L.Krienitz, E.H.Hegewald, D.Hepperle, V.A.R.Huss, T.Rohr & M.Wolf

Type species
- Parachlorella beijerinckii L.Krienitz, E.H.Hegewald, D.Hepperle, V.A.R.Huss, T.Rohr & M.Wolf

Species
- Parachlorella kessleri; Parachlorella beijerinckii; Parachlorella hussii

Genus of algae

Parachlorella is a genus of green algae in the order Chlorellales. The genus Parachlorella is more or less indistinguishable from the similar genus Chlorella using morphological features alone; the two genera differ genetically, and can be identified using their 18S ribosomal RNA.

Parachlorella consists of solitary, egg-shaped to spherical cells, sometimes covered in a gelatinous layer. The chloroplast is parietal and contains a broadly elliptical pyrenoid sheathed in grains of starch. Reproduction occurs through autospores. It is found in freshwater habitats, or soil.
