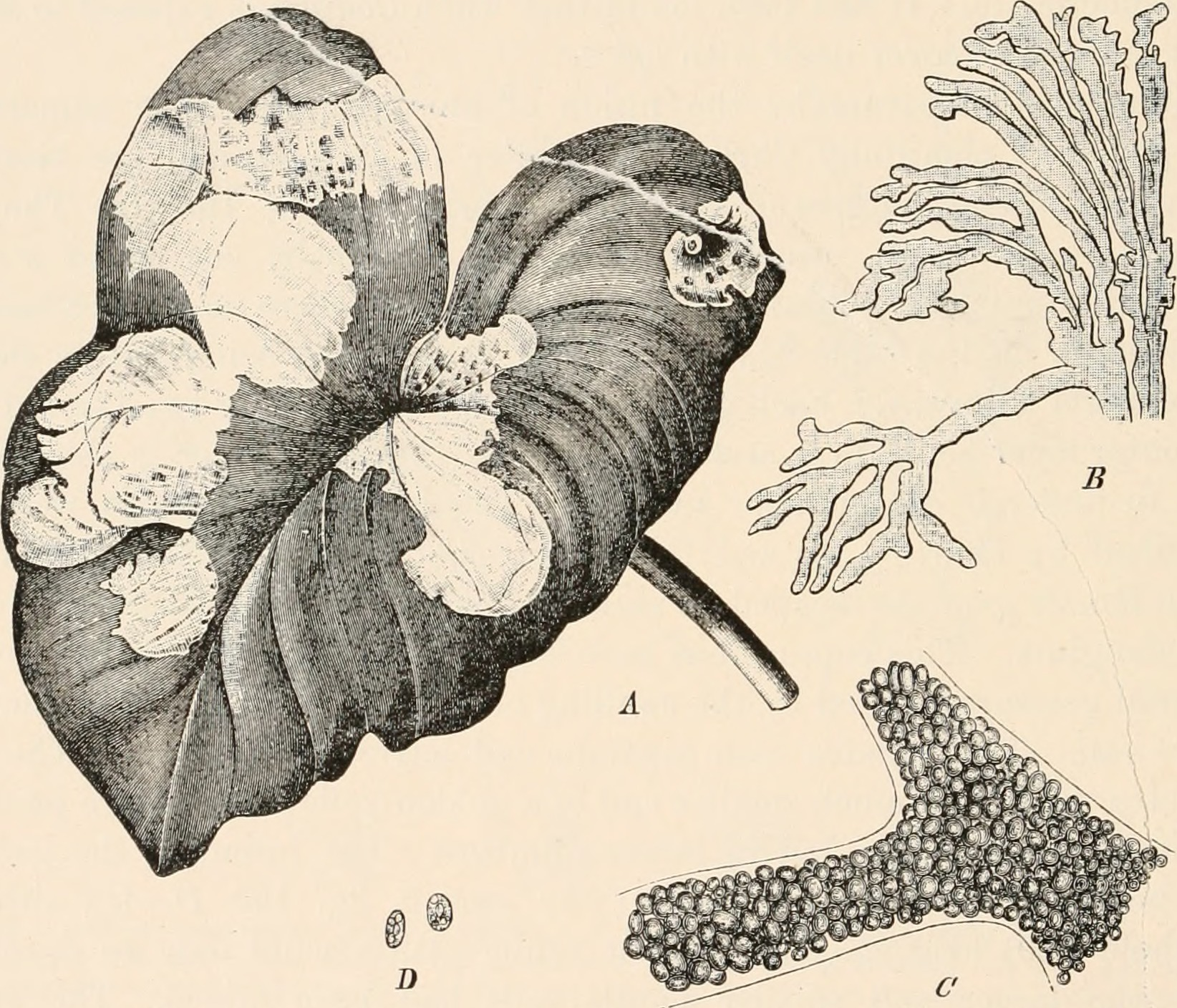
- Illustration of Phyllosiphon arisari: A, leaf of Arisarum vulgare showing the infection; B, algal branches in the petiole; C, part of algal thallus with aplanospores; D, aplanospores

Scientific classification
- Domain: Eukaryota
- Supergroup: Archaeplastida
- Clade: Viridiplantae
- Division: Chlorophyta
- Class: Trebouxiophyceae
- Order: Phyllosiphonales
- Family: Phyllosiphonaceae
- Genus: Phyllosiphon; J.G.Kühn, 1878

Type species
- Phyllosiphon arisari J.G.Kühn

Species
- Phyllosiphon alocasiae Lagerheim; Phyllosiphon ari Procházková, Němková & Neustupa; Phyllosiphon arisari J.G.Kühn; Phyllosiphon coccidium H.Y.Song, Y.X.Hu, H.Zhu, Q.H.Wang, G.X.Liu & Z.Y.Hu; Phyllosiphon deformans Mangenot; Phyllosiphon duini K.Procházková, Y.Nemcová & J.Neustupa; Phyllosiphon maximus Lagerheim; Phyllosiphon philodendri Lagerheim

= Phyllosiphon =

Genus of algae

Phyllosiphon is a genus of green algae in the class Trebouxiophyceae. Unusually among the green algae, members of Phyllosiphon are often parasitic within the leaves of Araceae, causing necrosis. It has a mostly tropical to subtropical distribution, and is found primarily in the Mediterranean region, but has also been isolated in North America, Australia, Africa, and China.

== Description ==
Most members of Phyllosiphon are parasitic green algae that inhabit the leaves of plants in the family Araceae. When inside the leaves, they cause yellowish-green spots; they remain greenish in color even when the leaf dries. Microscopically, the thallus of Phyllosiphon consists of branched, siphonal filaments which penetrate the space between leaf parenchyma cells. Asexual reproduction occurs from the formation of endospores, which fill the filaments. Endospores are about 3-6 μm in diameter and ellipsoidal.

A number of species of Phyllosiphon are free-living, but are phylogenetically in the same clade as parasitic Phyllosiphon species, and are therefore placed in the genus. When free-living, the cells are solitary and coccoid. Cells contain a single parietal, lobed chloroplast with or without pyrenoids, as well as oil droplets and carbohydrates.

== Ecology ==
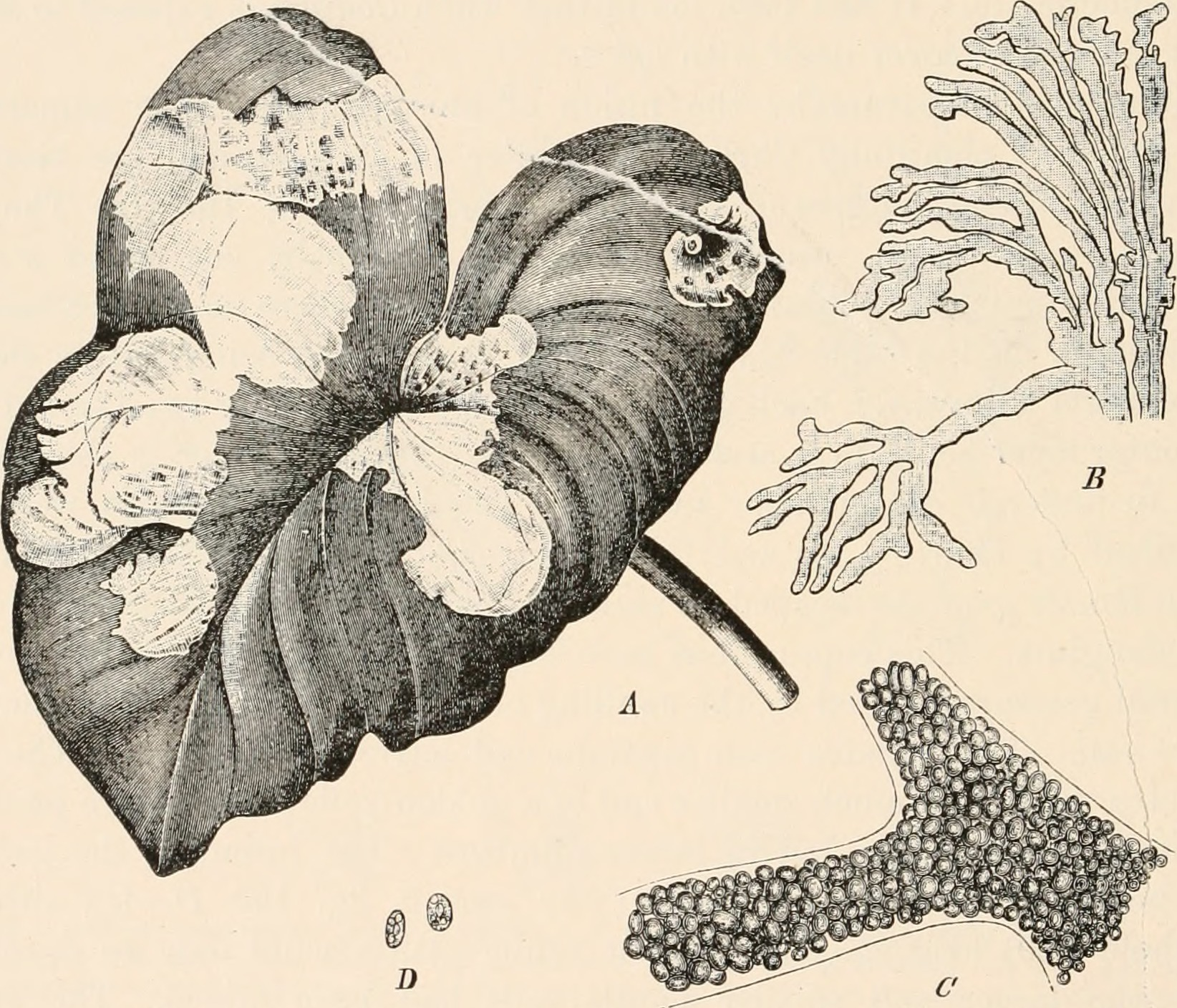
Illustration of the phytopathogenic green algae Phyllosiphon arisari, which affects the foliage of Arisarum

The species Phyllosiphon arisari Kühn induces necrosis in leaf tissue of Arisarum, after invading the intracellular space. Another species, Phyllosiphon ari, parasitizes leaves of Arum italicum. Five additional species have been described from the tropics, but have not been reported since.

When free-living, Phyllosiphon species inhabit a variety of terrestrial habitats, in particular subaerial biofilms on tree bark.
