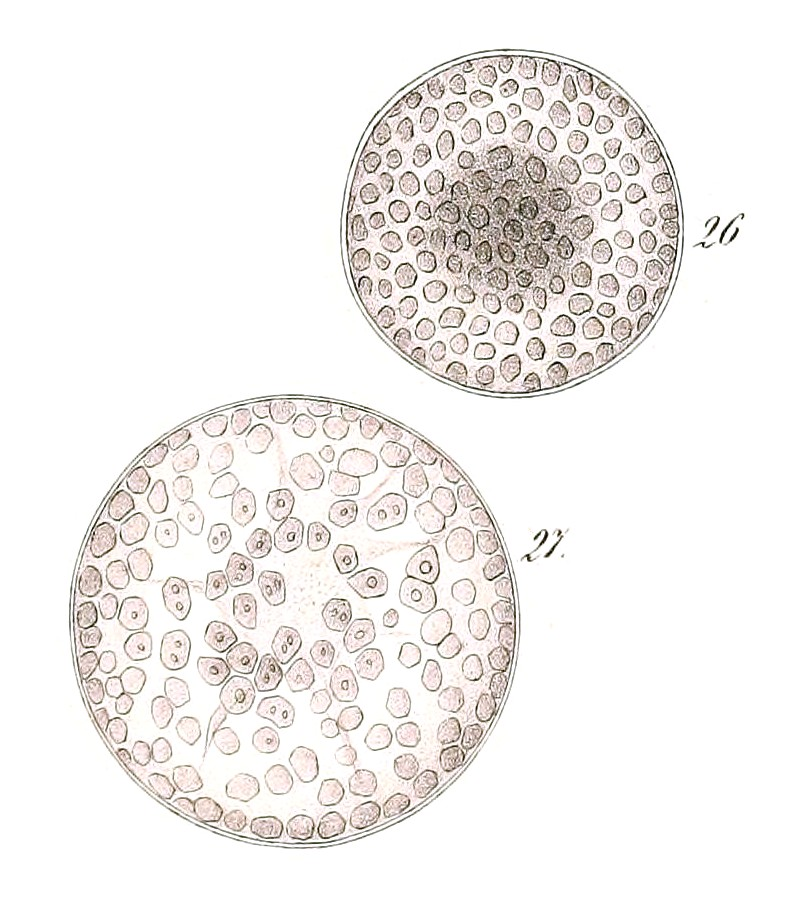

Scientific classification
- Kingdom: Plantae
- Division: Chlorophyta
- Class: Trebouxiophyceae
- Order: Chlorellales
- Family: Oocystaceae
- Genus: Eremosphaera; De Bary, 1858

Type species
- Eremosphaera viridis De Bary

Species
- Eremosphaera antillana; Eremosphaera eremosphaeria; Eremosphaera gigas; Eremosphaera minor; Eremosphaera oocystoides; Eremosphaera tanganyikae; Eremosphaera viridis; Eremosphaera yanshanensis

= Eremosphaera =

Genus of algae

Eremosphaera is a genus of green algae in the family Oocystaceae. It was first described by Heinrich Anton de Bary in 1858, who thought it was a desmid. Since then, many authors have debated its classification, until its modern placement in the family Oocystaceae.

Eremosphaera is widely distributed in freshwater habitats around the world. Most species of Eremosphaera, including the type species E. viridis are associated with Sphagnum bogs, which are characteristically acidic and associated with desmids. A few species prefer alkaline habitats, such as Eremosphaera minor which grows in alkaline soil. Because of its large size, it is used as a model organism to study cell physiology.

The genus name comes from the Greek roots eremos, meaning "solitary", and sphaira, meaning "ball".

== Description ==
Eremosphaera consists of relatively large cells which are solitary or in clusters of two to four, with or without a mucilaginous envelope. Cells are spherical to ellipsoidal 23–130 × 20–120 μm, with a thick cellulosic cell wall up to 1 μm thick. Some species are thickened at the poles, while one species (Eremosphaera oocystoides) has spicules covering the surface. The cytoplasm is filled with a large central vacuole with radial strands of cytoplasm which connect the nucleus to its periphery. The cytoplasm may have numerous oil droplets, granules, or calcium oxalate crystals. The central nucleus is about 5 to 31 μm in diameter, with up to five nucleoli. Each cell has many parietal (sometimes radial) chloroplasts; the chloroplasts are discoid, with one to three pyrenoids.

Asexual reproduction occurs via the formation of autospores; two to four are produced per sporangium and these are released through a rupture in the parental cell wall. Sexual reproduction has only been documented in on species, E. viridis, and is oogamous and homothallic. Sixteen to 64 sperm cells produced in an antheridium, and are biflagellate, spherical and lack plastids or a stigma. Egg cells are similar in morphology to autospores; when fertilized, zygotes produced thickened walls.

== Classification ==
Eremosphaera is classified in the subfamily Eremosphaeroideae of the family Oocystaceae, along with Oocystaenium and Excentrosphaera. The subfamily is distinguished by having relatively large cells, many chloroplasts, and a smooth cell wall. It is unclear whether it is monophyletic, since phylogenetic studies often find it as a basal evolutionary grade to the rest of Oocystaceae.

Species are distinguished from each other based on details of morphology, namely the size and shape of the cells and their chloroplasts. However, the genus is in need of taxonomic revision, and is not monophyletic as currently circumscribed.
