= Koliellopsis =

Scientific classification
- Clade: Viridiplantae
- Division: Chlorophyta
- Class: Trebouxiophyceae
- Order: incertae sedis
- Family: incertae sedis
- Genus: Koliellopsis; Lokhorst
- Species: K. inundata

Binomial name
- Koliellopsis inundata Lokhorst

Genus of algae

Koliellopsis is a genus of green algae in the class Trebouxiophyceae. As of February 2022, AlgaeBase accepted only one species in the genus, Koliellopsis inundata.
