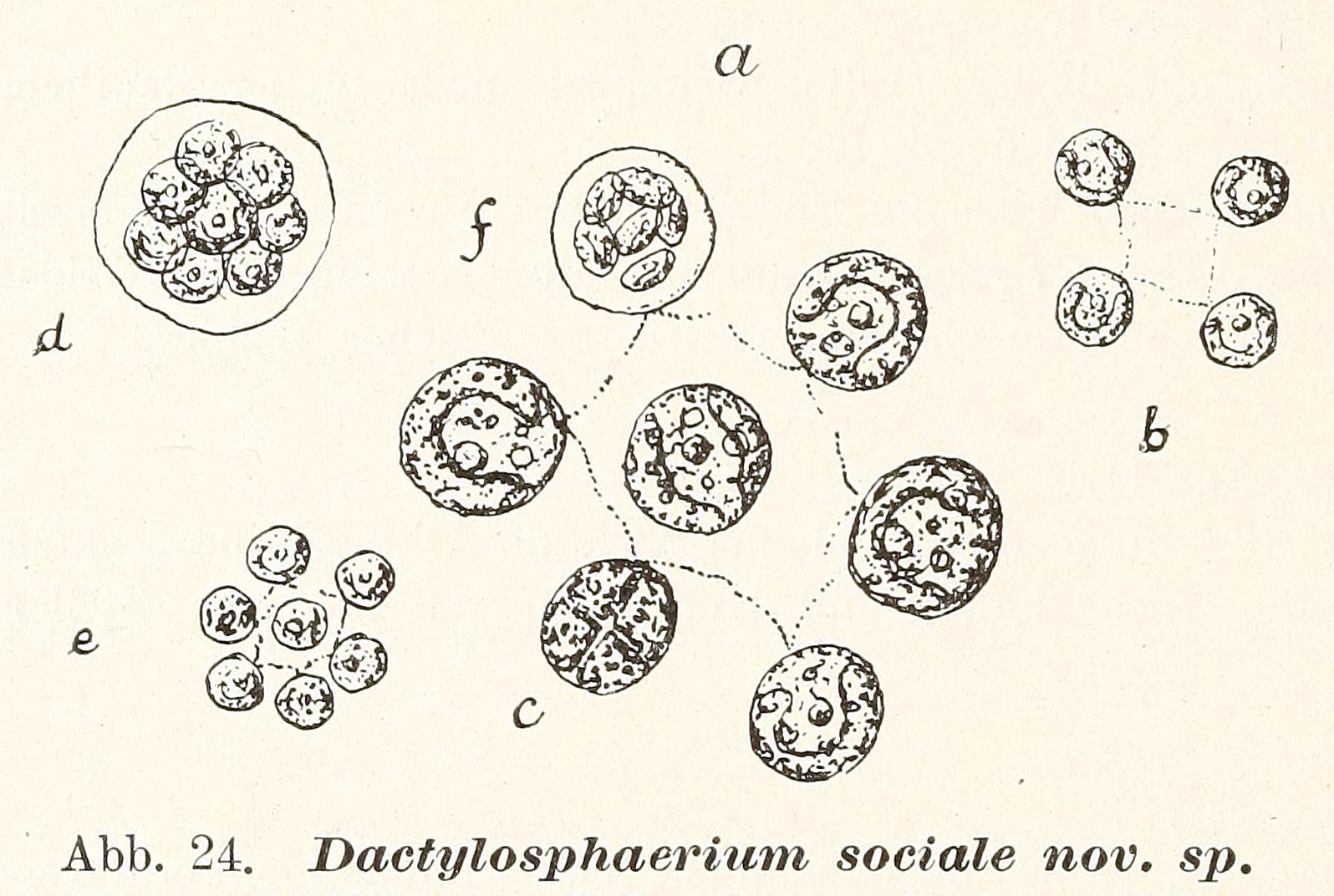

Scientific classification
- Clade: Viridiplantae
- Division: Chlorophyta
- Class: Trebouxiophyceae
- Order: incertae sedis
- Family: Dictyosphaeriaceae; Kützing

Genera
- See text

= Dictyosphaeriaceae =

Family of algae

Dictyosphaeriaceae is a family of green algae. As of February 2022, AlgaeBase places two genera in the family:

- Dactylosphaerium Steinecke
- Dimorphococcopsis C.-C.Jao

However, AlgaeBase does not include the type genus Dictyosphaeria in the family.

Members of the family can reproduce either asexually by use of an autospore, or sexually by fertilization of an egg by sperm. They form colonies which have a gelatinous coating. The four (or more?) daughter cells connect via filaments derived from the cell wall of the mother cell. The cell body is elliptical, spherical, or heart shaped. It has a single chloroplast which is plate-like or cup-shaped and contains a pyrenoid.
