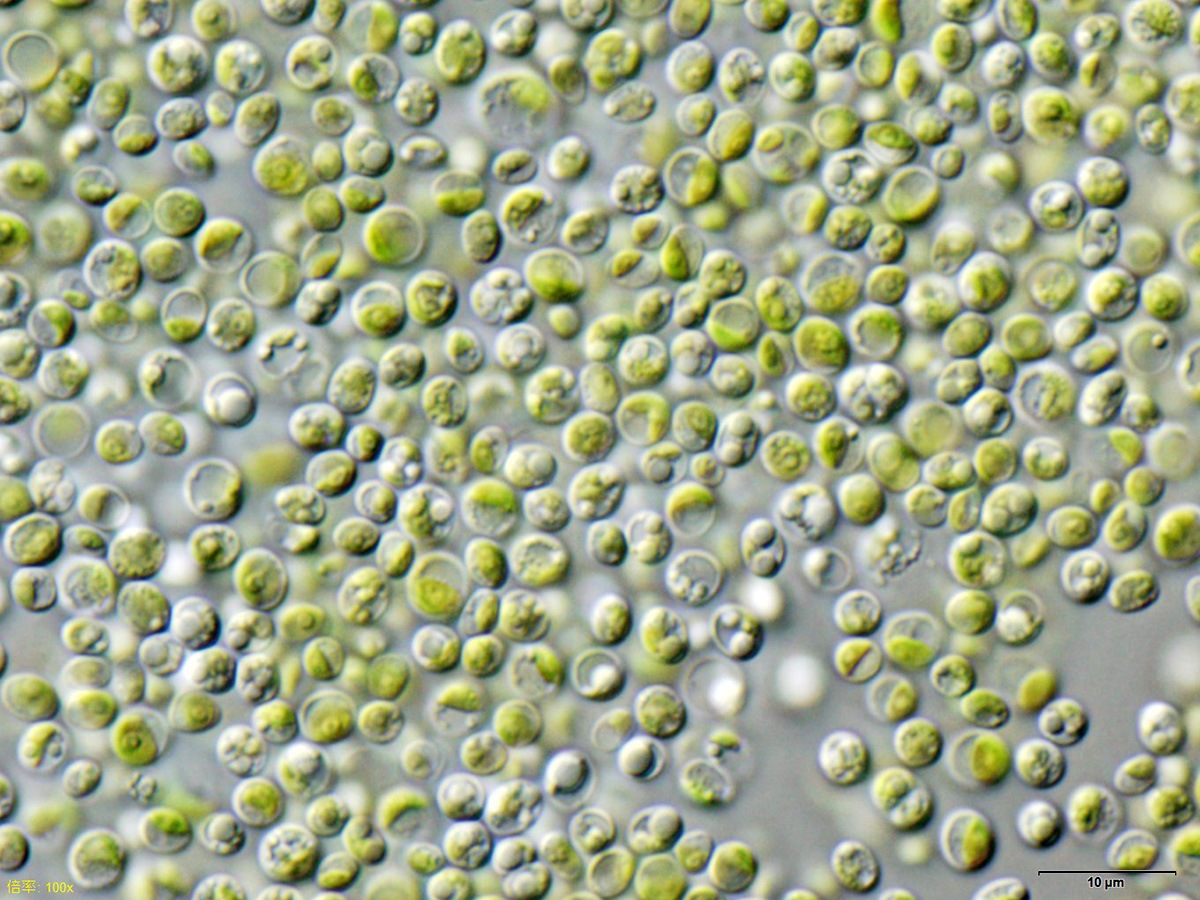
- Chlorella vulgaris

Scientific classification
- Kingdom: Plantae
- Division: Chlorophyta
- Class: Trebouxiophyceae
- Order: Chlorellales
- Family: Chlorellaceae; Brunnthaler

Genera
- See below

= Chlorellaceae =

Family of algae

Chlorellaceae are a family of green algae in the order Chlorellales. About 250 species are currently accepted in the family. Members of the family are distributed worldwide and are common in a variety of freshwater, terrestrial and marine environments.

Members of the family Chlorellaceae are important ecologically, mainly as primary producers. Algae such as Chlorella are important model organisms for plant physiology and biochemistry, because of they are easy to cultivate and grow rapidly. Additionally, many members are rich in lipids, carbohydrates and vitamins, making them of interest in the field of biotechnology. Meanwhile, genera such as Prototheca are of clinical significance as pathogens of humans and other animals.

== Description ==
Members of Chlorellaceae are morphologically diverse and include solitary and colonial forms. Traditionally, the family was circumscribed based on the mode of reproduction (production of autospores), and the family was defined around the type genus Chlorella, which is generally solitary and consists of spherical cells. However, based on molecular evidence, a number of genera have been moved into Chlorellaceae that differ significantly in morphology; these include Actinastrum (elongate cells in colonies), Micractinium (spherical cells with bristles), and Didymogenes (colonial cells with a thick mucilaginous envelope). Cells generally contain a single chloroplast with a pyrenoid.

In addition to autotrophic members that contain a chloroplast, the family includes genera which have lost the ability to photosynthesize are therefore heterotrophic. These genera, namely Prototheca and Helicosporidium, are colorless, single-celled organisms that resemble yeast, and are opportunistic pathogens of animals.

== Genera ==
As of 2025, AlgaeBase includes the following genera:

- Acanthosphaera
- Actinastrum
- Apodococcus
- Auxenochlorella
- Ava
- Brachionococcus
- Carolibrandtia
- †Caryosphaeroides
- Catena
- Chlorella
- Chloroparva
- Closteriopsis
- Compactochlorella
- Coronacoccus
- Coronastrum
- Cylindrocelis
- Dicellula
- Dicloster
- Dictyosphaerium
- Didymogenes
- Endolithella
- Geminella
- Gloeotila
- Golenkiniopsis
- Hegewaldia
- Helicosporidium
- Heynigia
- Hindakia
- Hormospora
- Kalenjinia
- Keratococcus
- Laetitia
- Lewiniosphaera
- Marasphaerium
- Marinichlorella
- Marvania
- Masaia
- Meyerella
- Micractinium
- Mucidosphaerium
- Muriella
- Nannochloris
- Nanochlorum
- Nomia
- Palmellochaete
- Parachlorella
- Planktochlorella
- Podohedra
- Prototheca
- Pseudochloris
- Pseudosiderocelopsis
- Pumiliosphaera
- Siderocelis

== Phylogeny ==
Higher-order relationships within Chlorellaceae are largely unresolved, with conflicting topologies; however, there are several well-supported clades:

- The Chlorella clade, containing Chlorella as well as other genera such as Actinastrum and Micractinium:
- The Parachlorella clade, containing Parachlorella and other genera such as Dictyosphaerium:
- The Nannochloris clade, containing genera such as Nannochloris, Marvania and Picochlorum
- The AHP clade, which contains the auxotrophic or heterotrophic members Auxenochlorella, Helicosporidium, and Prototheca.

In addition, several taxa form their own lineage not part of a larger clade, such as Muriella terrestris and Endolithella mcmurdoensis.

Current hypotheses on the phylogenetic relationships between taxa are as follows:

- - Chlorellaceae
    - - Chlorella clade
        - - - - - - Chlorella
                  - Micractinium
                - Actinastrum
              - Carolibrandtia
            - - - - Hindakia
                  - Lewiniosphaera
                - Heynigia
              - - Didymogenes
                - Brachionococcus (syn. Aliichlorella)
          - Meyerella
        - Hegewaldia
      - Parachlorella clade
        - - - - Parachlorella
              - Marasphaerium
              - Dictyosphaerium (polyphyletic)
              - Compactochlorella
              - Mucidosphaerium
              - Planktochlorella
            - Closteriopsis
            - Coronacoccus
            - Masaia
          - Marinichlorella
        - Dicloster
        - Kalenjinia
    - Muriella terrestris
    - Nannochloris clade
      - - Picochlorum
        - Laetitia
        - Nannochloris
        - Edaphochloris
        - Pumiliosphaera
        - Koliella pro parte
        - Catena
        - Gloeotila contorta
        - Nomia
        - Ava
      - - Chloroparva
        - Pseudochloris
    - Endolithella mcmurdoensis
    - AHP clade (Auxenochlorella, Helicosporidium, Prototheca)
  - Oocystaceae (outgroup)

Not all genera are included, as some (e.g. Cylindrocelis, Palmellochaete, etc.) have not been studied using molecular methods. In addition, some genera such as Geminella appear to cluster outside of Chlorellales.
