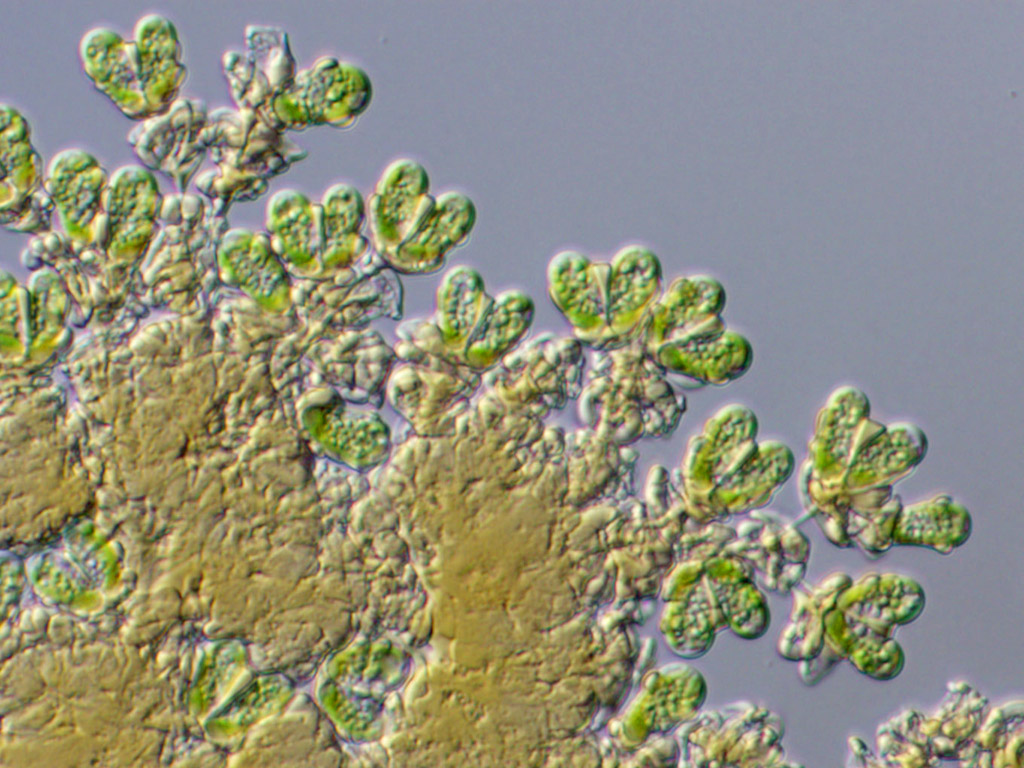
- Botryococcus braunii

Scientific classification
- Kingdom: Plantae
- Division: Chlorophyta
- Class: Trebouxiophyceae
- Order: Trebouxiales
- Family: Botryococcaceae
- Genus: Botryococcus; Kützing, 1849

Type species
- Botryococcus braunii Kützing

Species
- See text

= Botryococcus =

Botryococcus Temporal range: Precambrian - Recent >542–0 Ma

Genus of algae

Botryococcus is a genus of green algae. It is a microscopic or semi-microscopic alga that is found in freshwater habitats worldwide. It consists of colonies of cells in an irregular, gelatinous matrix.

Botryococcus produces high amounts of oil, which often make the colonies colored yellowish to reddish. When seen with a microscope, colonies release oil under the pressure of a cover slip. Because of its high amounts of oil, Botryococcus is of interest to the field of biotechnology, as it is a promising source of biofuel.

In addition to its current biosynthetic capabilities, fossils of the genus are known since Precambrian times, and form the single largest biological contributor to crude oil, and are a major component of oil shales.

== Taxonomy ==
The genus and its holotype were described in 1849 by Friedrich Traugott Kützing.

== Description ==
Botryococcus consists of irregularly shaped colonies of cells; in some species or when old, the colonies may be composed of subcolonies connected by gelatinous strands. Cells are 6-20 μm long and 2.5-8 μ wide, elongate, obovoid and narrower near the center of the colonies, ovoid, or spherical, and arranged around the periphery of the colony in one layer. They are partially or wholly submerged in a gelatinous matrix, or may be attached to the gelatinous matrix at the base. The matrix is often impregnated with oil that gives the colony a yellowish, brownish or reddish color. Cells are uninucleate (with one nucleus) and contain a single parietal, cup-shaped chloroplast with one pyrenoid (but the pyrenoid may not be visible due to oil droplets crowding the protoplast).

Reproduction in Botryococcus occurs asexually by the formation of autospores. The protoplast divides into two, four, eight or 16 autospores, while the parent cell walls gelatinize. Sexual reproduction and zoospores have not been reported in this genus.

== Ecology ==
The algae is frequently found in plankton in waters with differing characteristics and a wide geographic distribution. It is an important component of algal blooms and the discoloration of water.

== Species ==
There are 13 accepted species in the genus.

- Botryococcus australis J.Komárek & P.Marvan 1992
- Botryococcus balkachicus Zalessky
- Botryococcus braunii Kützing 1849
- Botryococcus calcareus West 1892
- Botryococcus canadensis F.Hindák 1991
- Botryococcus comperei J.Komárek & P.Marvan 1992
- Botryococcus fernandoi J.Komárek & P.Marvan 1992
- Botryococcus neglectus (West & G.S.West) J.Komárek & P.Marvan 1992
- Botryococcus pila J.Komárek & P.Marvan 1992
- Botryococcus protuberans West & G.S.West 1905
- Botryococcus pusillus Goor 1924
- Botryococcus terribilis Komárek & Marvan 1992
- Botryococcus terricola Klebs 1883

Species-level delimitation of Botryococcus remains difficult. Species are distinguished by morphological characters such as the cell size, shape, and characteristics of the mucilage. However, the morphological characters may overlap and it is sometimes not possible to assign a population to a species.
