= Xerochlorella =

Scientific classification
- Clade: Viridiplantae
- Division: Chlorophyta
- Class: Trebouxiophyceae
- Order: incertae sedis
- Family: incertae sedis
- Genus: Xerochlorella; Fucíková, P.O.Lewis & L.A.Lewis, 2014

Species
- Xerochlorella dichotoma (H.P.Ling & R.D.Seppelt) Mikhailyuk & P.M. Tsarenko, 2020; Xerochlorella minuta (J.B.Petersen) Mikhailyuk & P.M.Tsarenko, 2020; Xerochlorella olmiae Fucíková, P.O.Lewis & L.A.Lewis, 2014

Genus of algae

Xerochlorella is a genus of green algae in the class Trebouxiophyceae.
