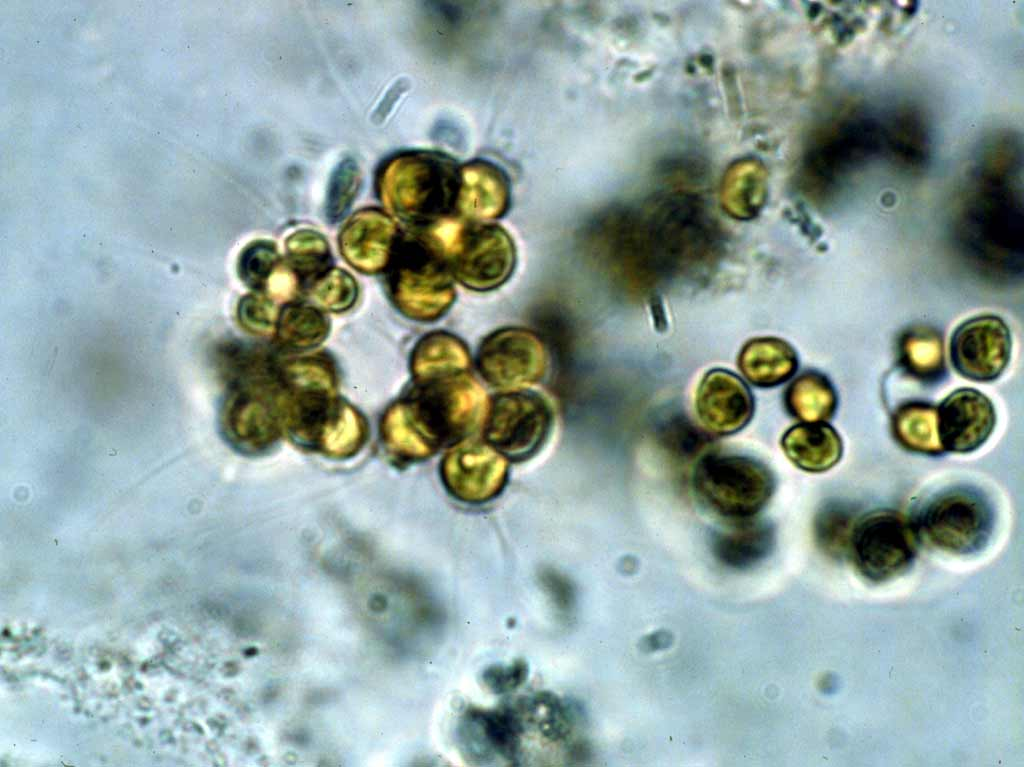
- Micractinium pusillum

Scientific classification
- Kingdom: Plantae
- Division: Chlorophyta
- Class: Trebouxiophyceae
- Order: Chlorellales
- Family: Chlorellaceae
- Genus: Micractinium; Fresenius, 1858

Type species
- Micractinium pusillum Fresenius

Species
- See text.

Synonyms
- Diacanthos Korshikov

= Micractinium =

Genus of algae

Micractinium is a genus of microscopic green algae in the family Chlorellaceae. Species of the genus Micractinium are found as phytoplankton, and are commonly found in freshwater habitats around the world. A few species are found as endosymbionts of ciliates. There is increasing interest in Micractinium due to its high growth rate and lipid production.

== Description ==
Cells of Micractinium are spherical to ellipsoidal, and are solitary or stuck together in colonies. Colonies can contain up to 128, occasionally 256 cells, and are polyhedral or pyramidal in shape. Most species generally produce long narrow bristles that taper from base to tip. Cells have a single cup-shaped chloroplast with a single pyrenoid. Bristles consist of protein and lack cellulosic fibers; they are produced after the cell wall.

Micractinium reproduces asexually via the formation of autospores (usually four per cell), which are released from by a rupture in the parental cell wall. Autospores generally remain attached to each other to form colonies, but occasionally detach and develop into single cells; when this happens, the number and arrangement of spines can differ from the typical morphology. In one species, Micractinium pusillum, oogamy has been reported, but this needs reinvestigation.

== Ecology ==
Members of the genus Micractinium are common in a variety of freshwater to brackish habitats, and can tolerate a wide array of temperatures, ranging from 0°C in Antarctica to hot springs over 70°C. They play an important role in the ecosystem, as primary producers and producers of oxygen. They also purify the water they inhabit via accumulation and mineralization of pollutants. Some species, such as Micractinium conductrix are obligate endosymbionts of ciliates; these species cannot produce grow without vitamin B1 and vitamin B12 and thus obtain them from their hosts.

== Taxonomy ==
The genus Micractinium was formerly placed in the family Micractiniaceae, characterized by sexual reproduction without the production of zoospores, and colonies covered with bristles. Molecular phylogenetic studies showed that Micractiniaceae was polyphyletic and that Micractinium was closely related to Chlorella. Accordingly, Micractinium has been transferred to the family Chlorellaceae.

Both Chlorella and Micractinium sporopollenin in their cell walls, and have pyrenoids that are transversed by thylakoid membranes and covered in a starch sheath. Traditionally, Micractinium has been distinguished from Chlorella on the basis of forming colonies and bristles. However, Micractinium sometimes does not produce bristles and colonies—it appears to be an inducible defense against grazers such as rotifers. Additionally, some species of Micractinium do not produce bristles, such as those that are endosymbiotic within other organisms.

The genus Diacanthos, distinguished by having exactly two spines on opposite sides of the cell, is a synonym of Micractinium.

=== Species ===
As of March 2022, AlgaeBase accepted the following species:

- Micractinium appendiculatum Korshikov
- Micractinium belenophorum (Korshikov) T.Proschold, C.Block, W.Luo & L.Kreinitz
- Micractinium bornhemiense (W.Conrad) Korshikov
- Micractinium conductrix (K.Brandt) Pröschold & Darienko
- Micractinium conococcoides T.Hortobagyi
- Micractinium crassisetum Hortobágyi
- Micractinium depressum C.-C.Jao & Ling
- Micractinium elongatum (H.J.Carter) Hegewald & Schnepf
- Micractinium extremum Hortobágyi
- Micractinium inermum R.Hoshina & Y.Fujiwara
- Micractinium kostikovii E.Krivina & A.Temraleeva
- Micractinium parvisetum Walton
- Micractinium parvum Hindák
- Micractinium pusillum Fresenius
- Micractinium quadrisetum (Lemmermann) G.M.Smith
- Micractinium simplicissimum H.Chae, H.-G. Choi & J.H.Kim
- Micractinium singularis H.Chae, H.-G.Choi & J.H.Kim
- Micractinium strigoniense T.Hortobagyi
- Micractinium tetrahymenae Pröschold, Pitsch & Darienko
- Micractinium valkanovii Vodenicarov
- Micractinium variabile H.Chae, H.-G.Choi & J.H.Kim

Species have traditionally been defined based on morphological characteristics, such as cell shape, colony shape, and number and size of bristles. However, Micractinium displays a large amount of phenotypic plasticity, such as producing or not producing bristles; this makes species delimitation based on morphological alone unreliable. This means there is a high amount of cryptic diversity within Micractinium.
