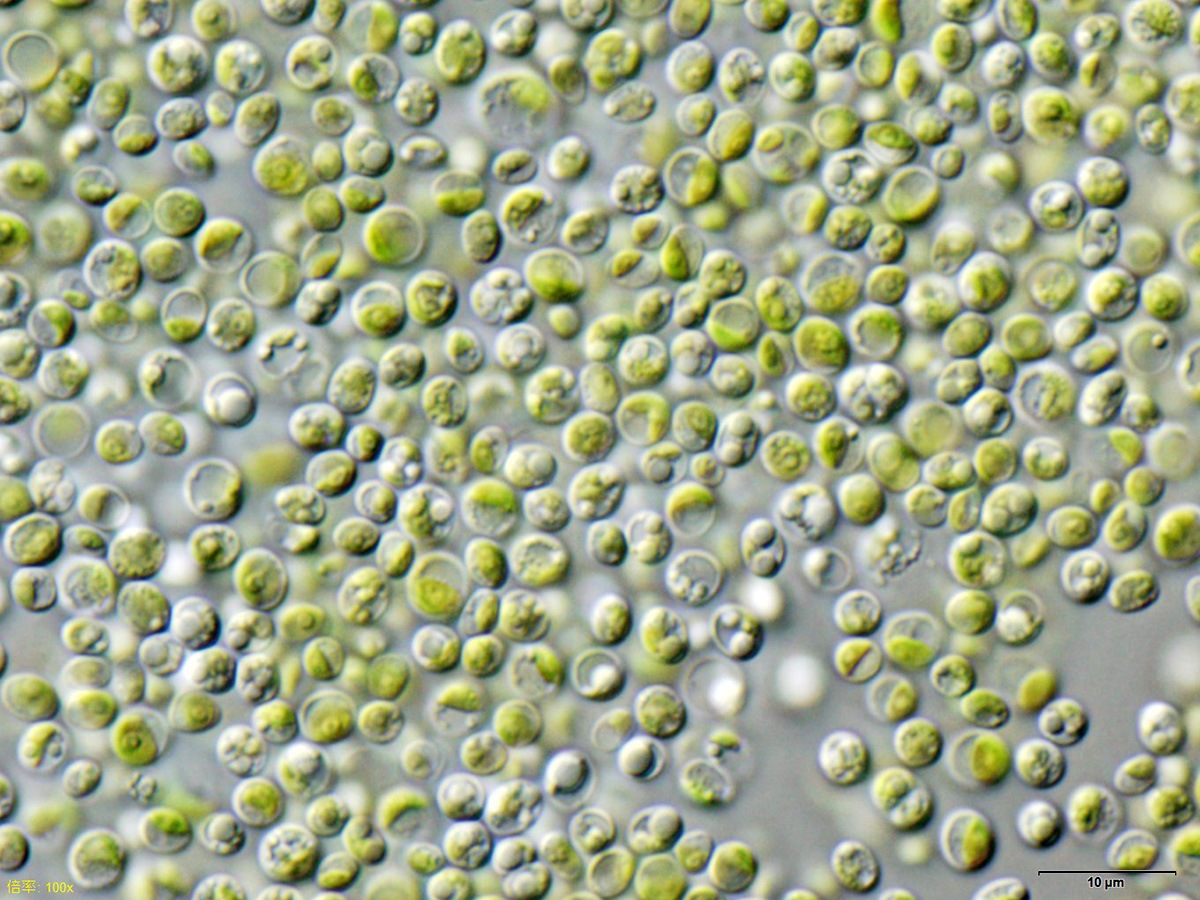
- Chlorella vulgaris

Scientific classification
- Kingdom: Plantae
- Division: Chlorophyta
- Subdivision: Chlorophytina
- Class: Trebouxiophyceae; Friedl, 1995

Orders
- See text

Synonyms
- Pleurastrophyceae K.R.Mattox & K.D.Stewart

= Trebouxiophyceae =

Class of algae

The Trebouxiophyceae, also known as trebouxiophytes, are a class of green algae, in the division Chlorophyta. Members of this class are single-celled, colonial, or multicellular and are found in freshwater, terrestrial or marine habitats worldwide. Many taxa in the Trebouxiophyceae form symbiotic relationships with other organisms; in particular, the majority of phycobionts within lichens are trebouxiophytes. A number of taxa have also lost the ability to photosynthesize, and have evolved to become parasitic; examples include Prototheca and Helicosporidium.

Trebouxiophyceae was originally defined by ultrastructural characteristics, but is now generally circumscribed based on phylogenetics, particularly based on the 18S rDNA locus. As of 2024, Trebouxiophyceae contains 211 genera and about 925 species.

== Morphology ==
Members of the Trebouxiophyceae are microscopic or macroscopic organisms which exist in a variety of forms: non-flagellate coccoid or elliptical single cells, unbranched filaments, blades, or colonies of cells. Although most species are photosynthetic with chloroplasts, a few genera (Helicosporidium and Prototheca) lack them. Chloroplasts are diverse in morphology and placement and may be axial and stellate (e.g. Prasiola), numerous and discoid (e.g. Eremosphaera), or parietal. Pyrenoids may be present or absent.

In most species, reproduction occurs exclusively asexual, and occurs via the formation of autospores or zoospores. Sexual reproduction is rare in the class, with reports from only a few taxa; isogamy, anisogamy and oogamy have all been reported. However, many more taxa possess the genes for sexual reproduction, suggesting it is more common than previously thought.

=== Ultrastructure ===
Trebouxiophyceaen algae are characterized by a combination of plesiomorphic traits. It has basal bodies of its flagella in a counterclockwise orientation, non-persistent, metacentric spindles during telophase, and phycoplast-mediated cytokinesis. The presence of counterclockwise basal bodies are shared with Ulvophyceae, the metacentric spindles are shared with walled prasinophytes, and the non-persistent spindles and phycoplasts are also present in Chlorophyceae. Some members do not produce flagellated stages at all.

== Ecology ==
Trebouxiophycean algae are common and widespread, and found in a variety of habitats. Terrestrial species live most commonly in places such rocks, soils or tree bark. However, some genera, such as Dictyosphaerium, are planktonic within fresh water, and may dominate the water column from early spring to late summer.

Marine trebouxiophycean algae such as Prasiola typically occupy the shoreline, and may exhibit tolerance to freezing. In these harsh environments, ultraviolet-absorbing compounds or cryoprotectants such as proline are often present.

=== Symbioses ===
Trebouxiophyceae is most well known for the ability to form symbiotic relationships with fungi, forming lichens. When associated with a lichen-forming fungus, the alga is termed a phycobiont. The fungus benefits from the carbohydrates provided by the algae, while the algae inhabit a matrix of hyphae which provide protection. Trebouxia (also the namesake of the class) and Asterochloris are the most common and widespread phycobionts of lichens; it is estimated that Trebouxia is associated with over 20% of all lichen-forming fungi worldwide.

Research on lichens has historically focused more on the fungal partner (the mycobiont) over the phycobionts. Research on trebouxiophycean phycobionts has been hampered by the time-consuming nature of identification. Because the morphology of these algae is often heavily influenced by the environment, reliable identification relies on molecular techniques such as DNA barcoding. However, recent research has discovered considerable diversity. It was previously thought that a specific mycobiont associates with only one type of phycobiont; however, it is now accepted that multiple trebouxiophycean algae can associate with a single species or even a single thallus.

In addition to lichens, single-celled microalgae (called zoochlorellae) are commonly found as endosymbionts within a variety of freshwater and marine organisms. Endosymbionts come from several genera, mainly Micractinium and Chlorella. The host organisms are diverse and include ciliates (e.g. Paramecium), sea anemones, Hydra and freshwater sponges. Paramecium bursaria is a well-studied example and model organism for endosymbiosis. The hosts may have an obligate or a facultative relationship with the symbionts.

=== Parasitism ===
Prototheca and Helicosporidium are two unusual examples of once-algal organisms which have lost their chloroplasts and become parasitic. Prototheca infects vertebrates (including humans), and induces protothecosis; Helicosporidium infects a wide array of invertebrates. Phyllosiphon is an unusual genus, consisting of branched siphonous filaments with chloroplasts. It is an endophytic parasite occurring in leaves, particularly the family Araceae.

Ecological diversity of Trebouxiophyceae

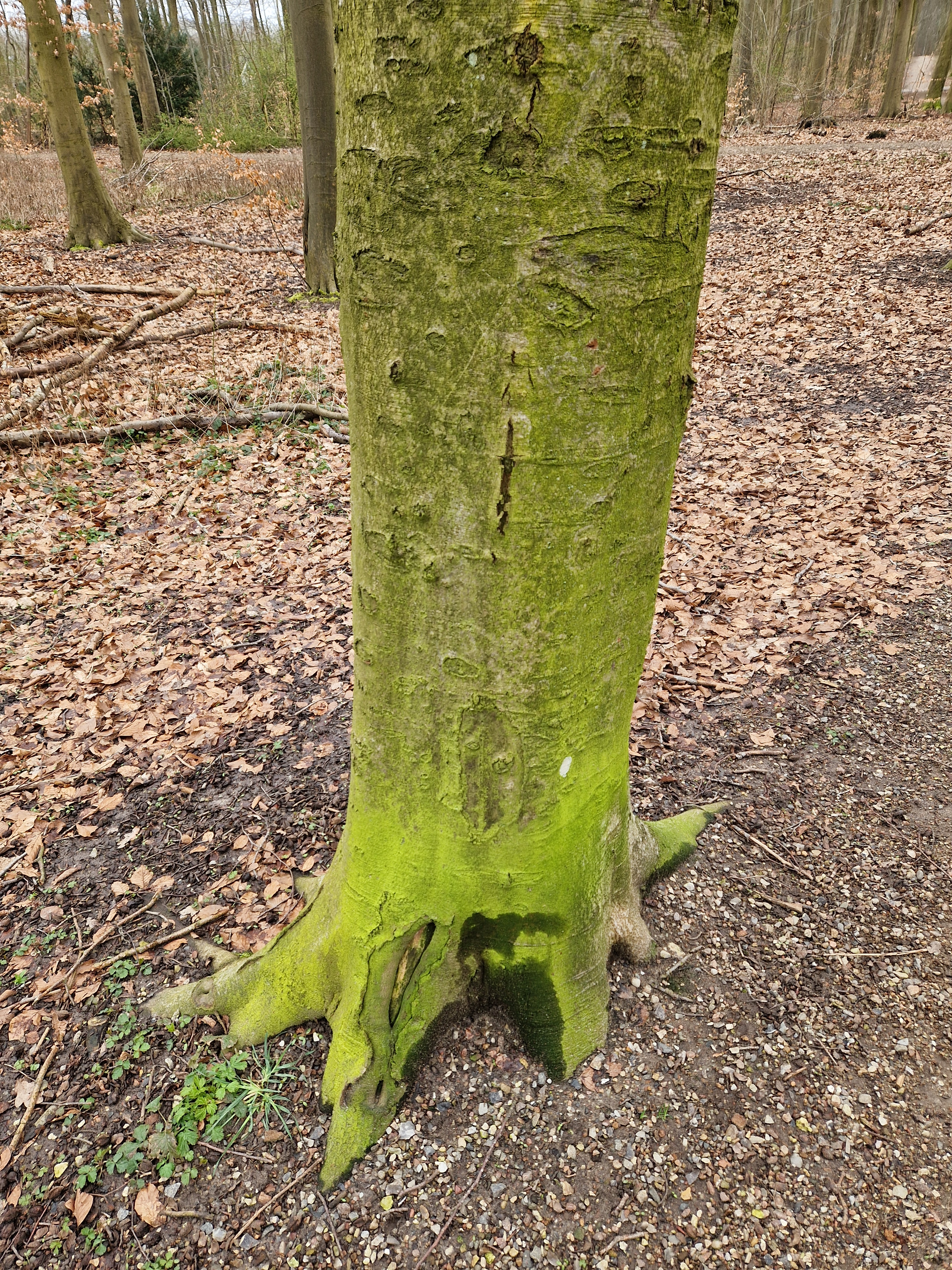
Desmococcus, a terrestrial alga growing on the bark of a beech tree

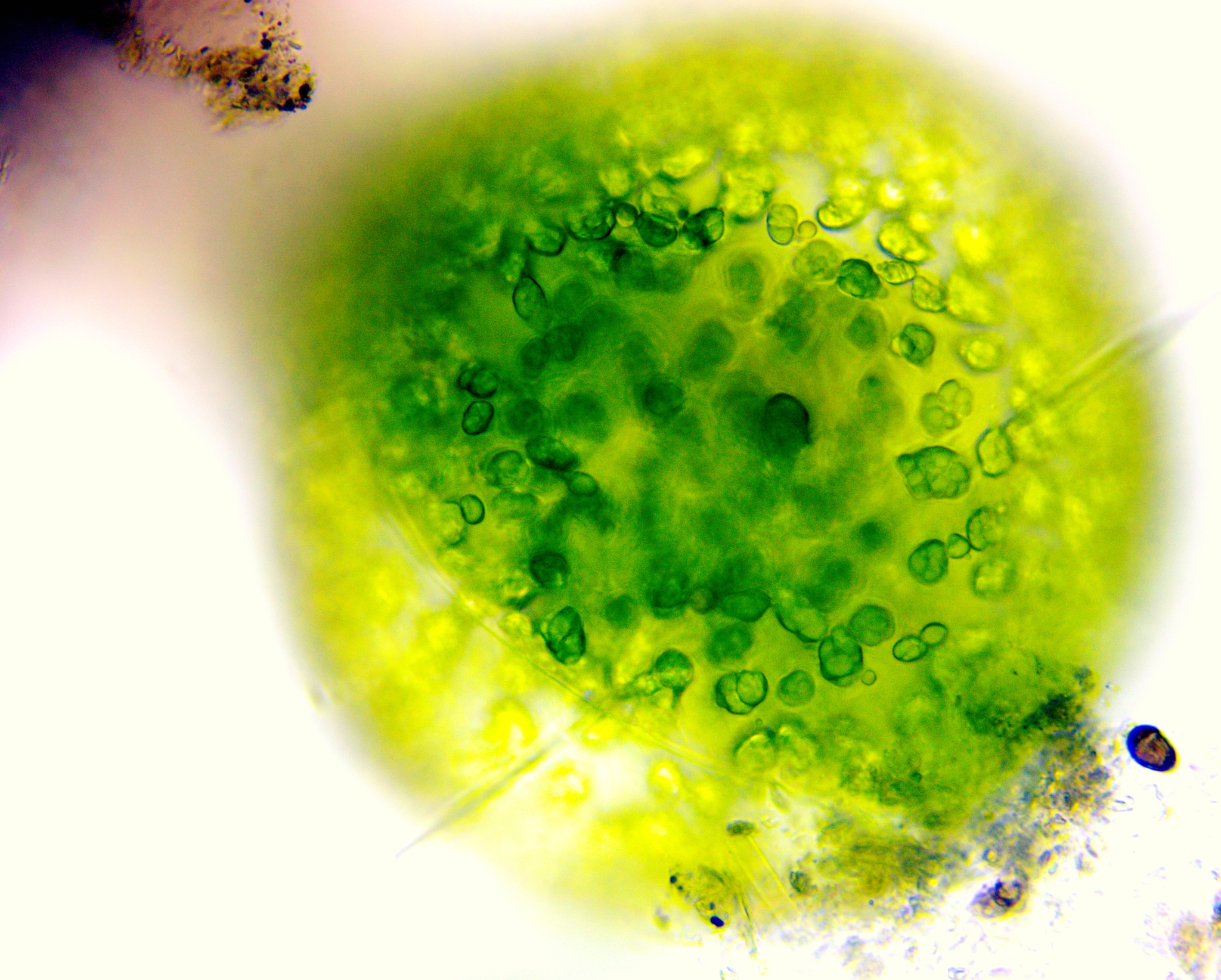
Eremosphaera, found in freshwater plankton

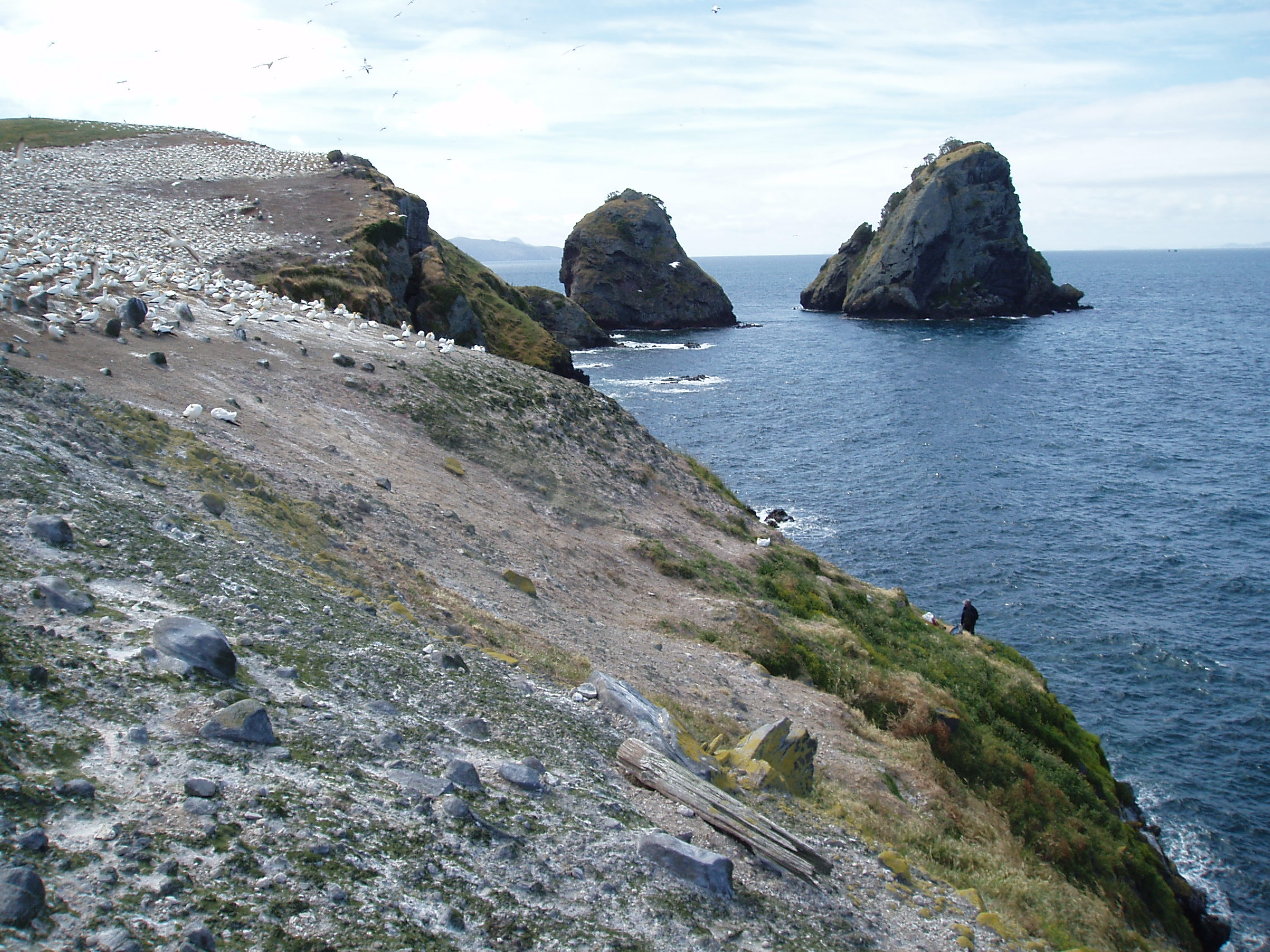
Prasiola stipitata growing on a rocky shore

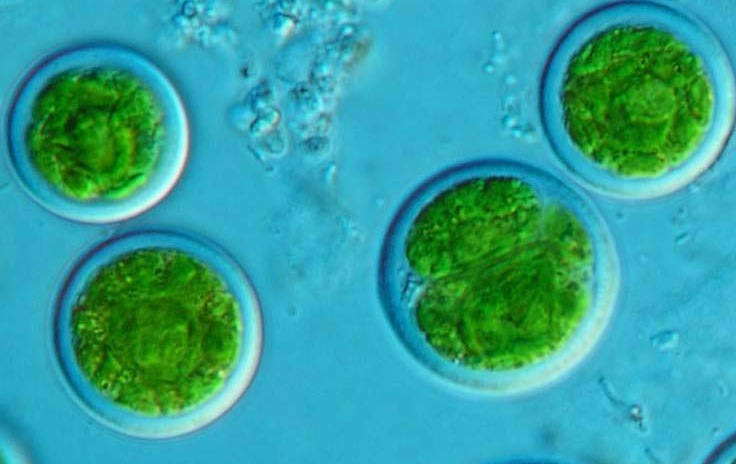
Trebouxia, a common phycobiont of lichens

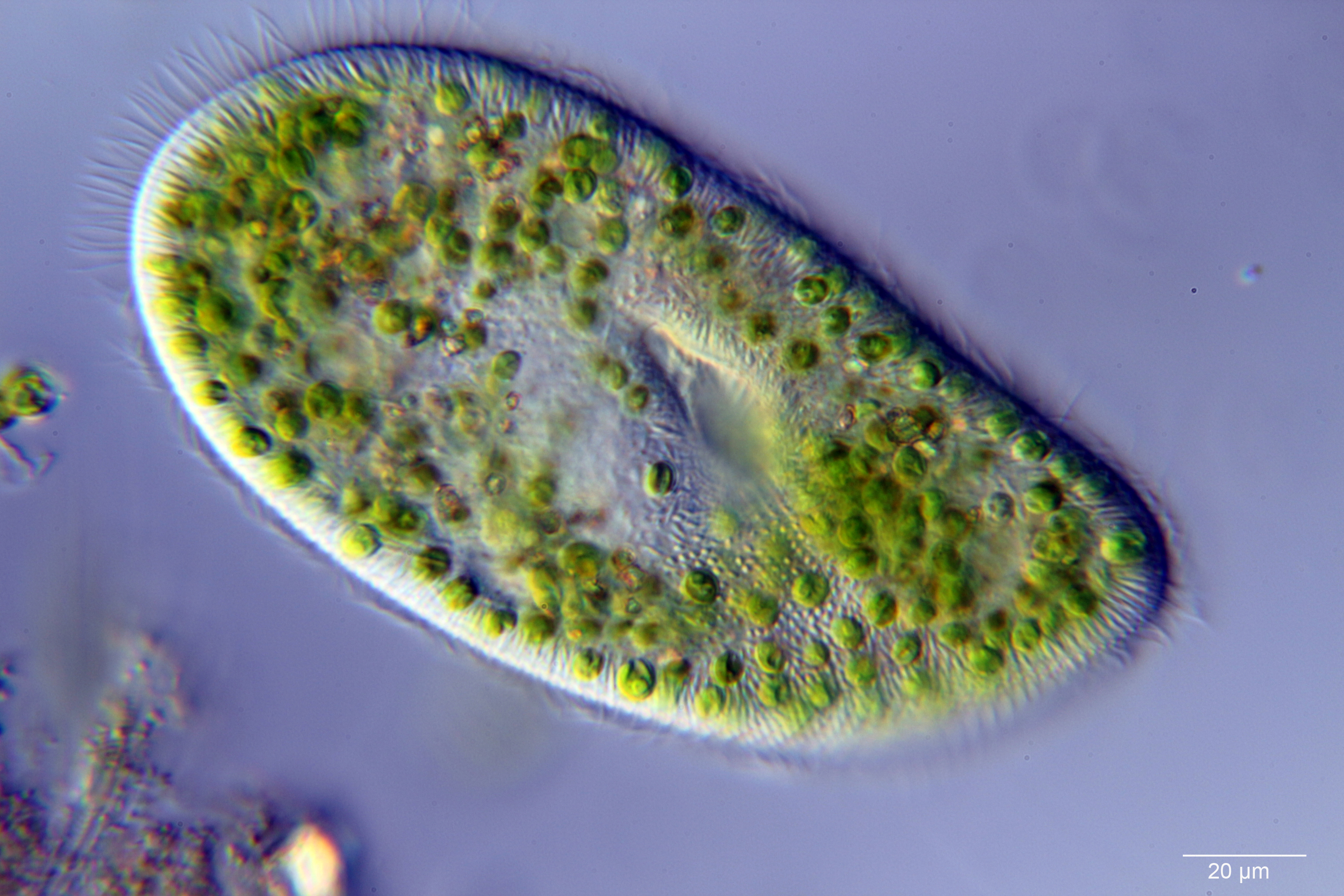
The ciliate Paramecium bursaria with endosymbiotic trebouxiophycean algae

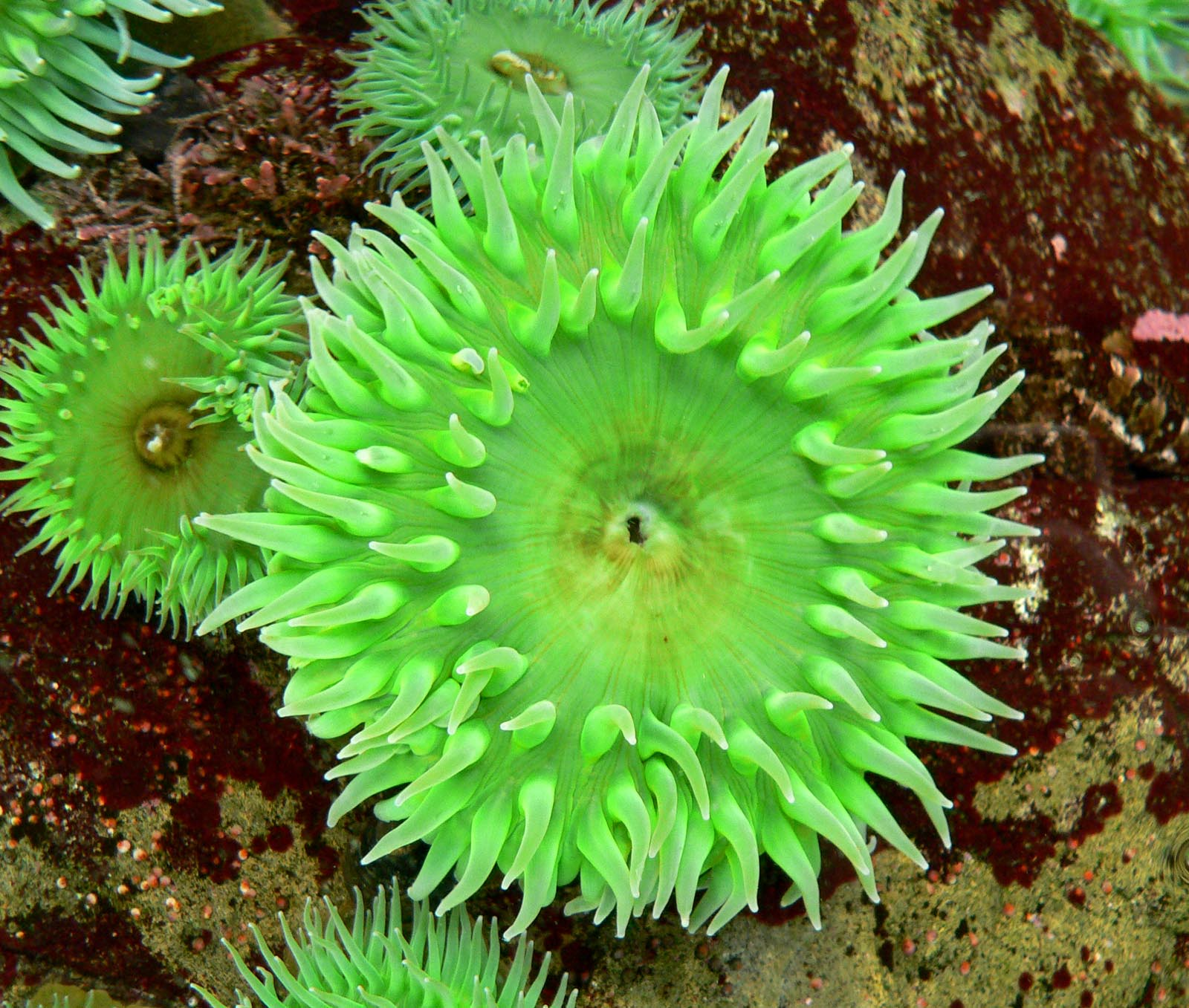
Anthopleura xanthogrammica; the green color is due to endosymbiotic Elliptochloris marina

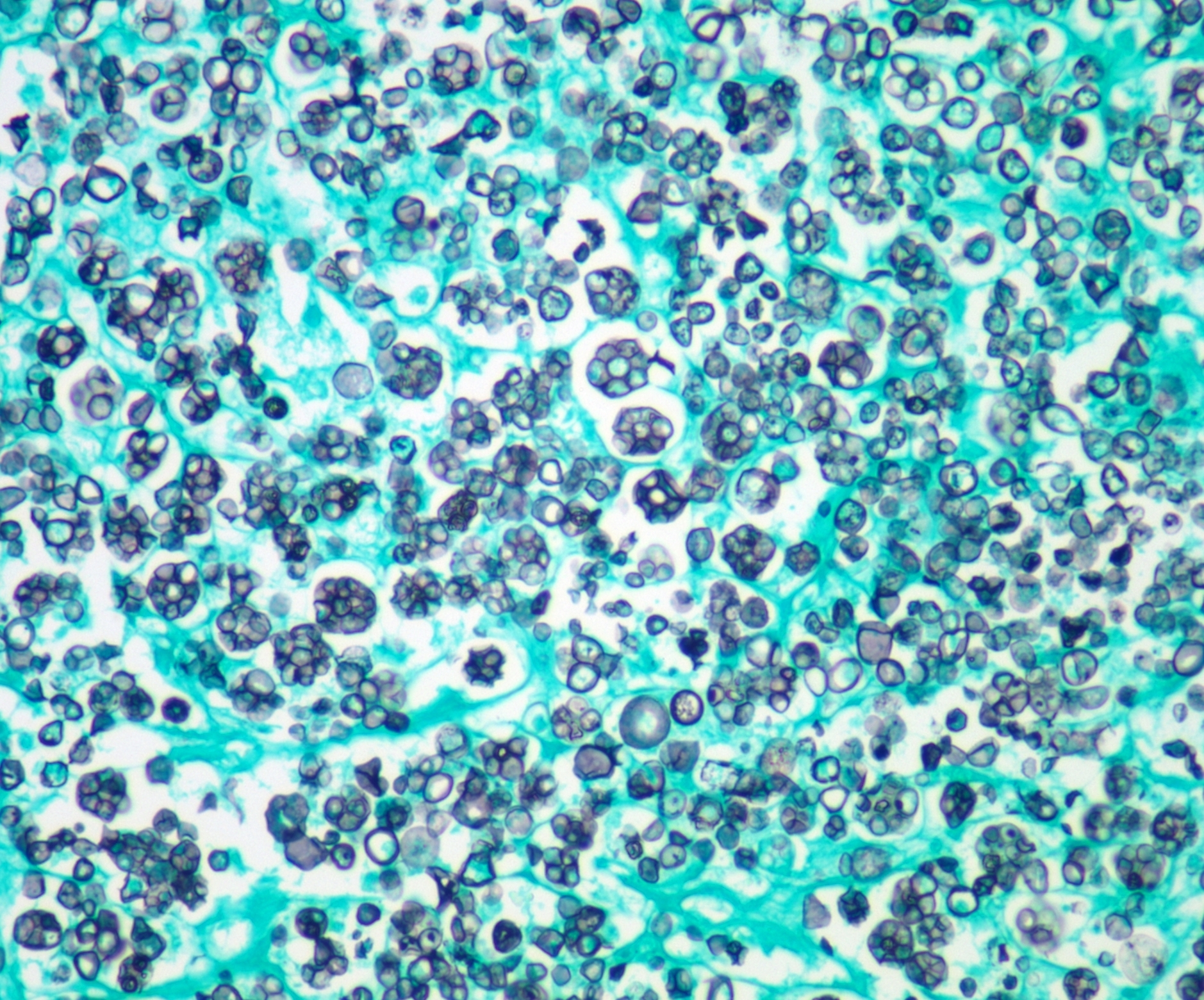
Photomicrograph (stained) of Prototheca wickerhamii infection in a human

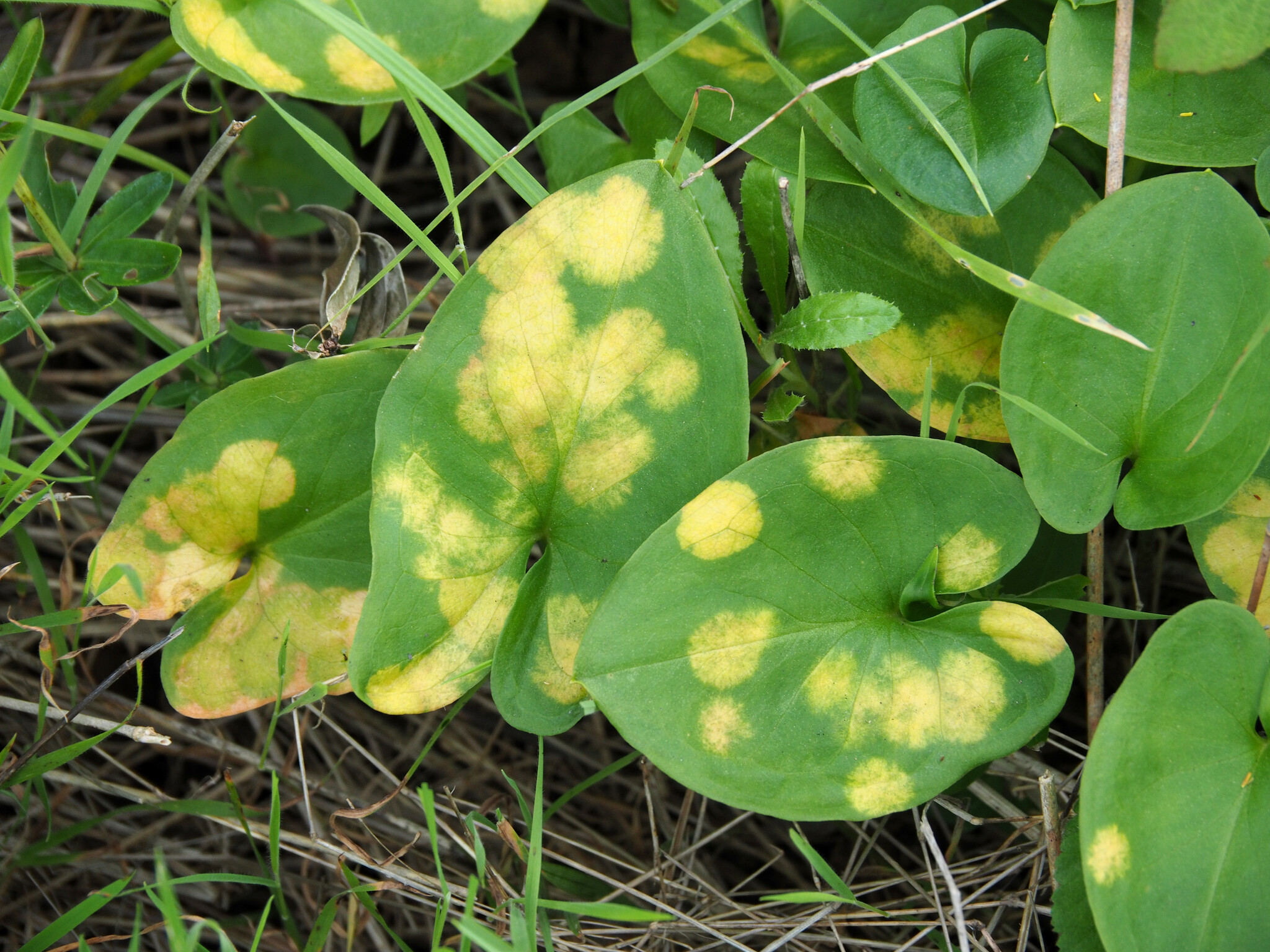
Parasitic alga Phyllosiphon arisari causing yellow spots on Arisarum

== Evolution and phylogeny ==
The clade Trebouxiophyceae likely originated about 600–800 million years ago, and fossils from trebouxiophycean algae have appeared in sediments dating back to at least the Precambrian. Fossil deposits of Botryococcus are a major component of oil shales.

The closest relatives of Trebouxiophyceae are Chlorophyceae and Ulvophyceae; together, they form a monophyletic group termed the UTC clade (also known as core Chlorophyta). The ancestral trebouxiophycean alga was likely a sexual organism; later lineages appear to have independently lost the ability to reproduce sexually many times. It is hypothesized that the production of autospores became advantageous in terrestrial environments, since flagellated cells require water for movement.

== Taxonomy ==
The taxonomy of algae has traditionally been based on morphological characters; however, microalgae typically have few morphological characters, and therefore morphological classifications are limited by convergent evolution and cryptic diversity. Therefore, modern taxonomic classifications involve an integrative species concept combining morphological and molecular data. Higher-level relationships within Trebouxiophyceae are not yet fully resolved.

As of 2025, AlgaeBase accepts the following orders:

- Chlorellales
- Microthamniales
- Phyllosiphonales
- Prasiolales
- Trebouxiales
- Watanabeales

Genera and families without intervening taxonomy include:

- Coccomyxaceae
- Dictyosphaeriaceae (Note: In AlgaeBase the type genus, Dictyosphaerium, is placed within Chlorellaceae.)
- Micractiniaceae (Note: In AlgaeBase the type genus, Micractinium, is placed within Chlorellaceae.)
- Ragelichloridaceae
- Apatococcus
- Autumnella
- Chlorolobion
- Chloropyrula
- Elliptochloris
- Eremochloris
- Glaphyrella
- Koliellopsis
- Lemmermannia
- Leptochlorella
- Leptosira
- Lunachloris
- Neochlorella
- Rhopalosolen
- Xerochlorella
- Xylochlorella

== Usage ==
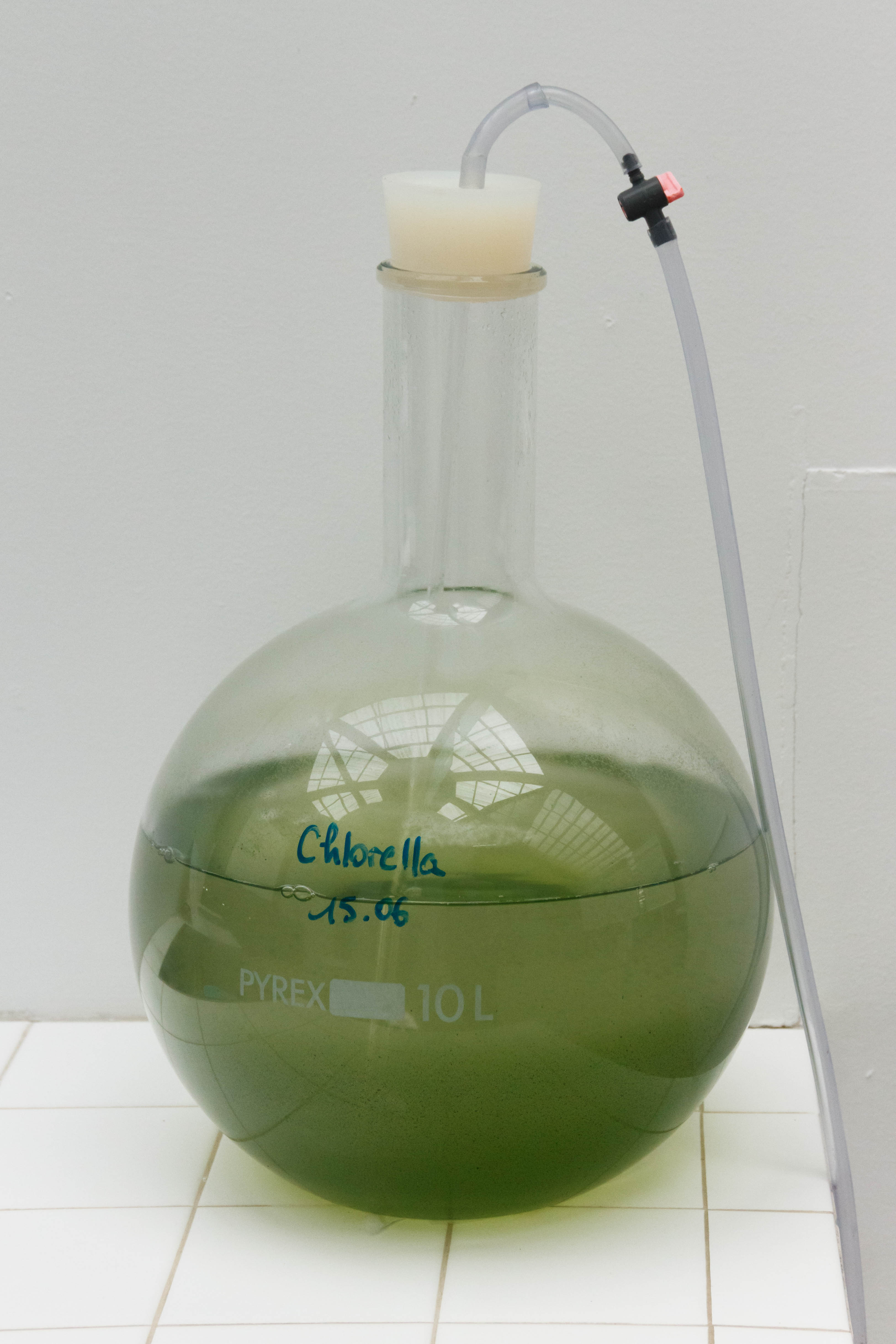
A liquid culture of Chlorella

The microalga Chlorella has been used by researchers to study basic elements of biochemistry and physiology, as an simpler analog of land plants. Biochemical research involving Chlorella has resulted in two Nobel Prizes: in 1931, Otto Heinrich Warburg was awarded the Nobel Prize in Physiology or Medicine for his research on cellular respiration, and in 1961, Melvin Calvin was awarded the Nobel Prize in Chemistry for studying carbon dioxide assimilation in plants, using Chlorella as a model.

Some trebouxiophycean microalgae are under interest as potential sources of biofuels or other products, such as proteins and lipids. Botryococcus is of particular interest as a producer for biodiesel, since it produces a high amount of lipids.

A few algae in Trebouxiophyceae are edible, such as Prasiola, which is edible and locally harvested for food Japan and Myanmar. In the mid-twentieth century, Chlorella was seen as an economical source of food and an answer to the global food crises of the time. Since then, improvements in crop yield have caused a decline in interest in Chlorella as food; however, it has a small market as a niche nutritional supplement.

== See also ==
- List of Trebouxiophyceae genera
