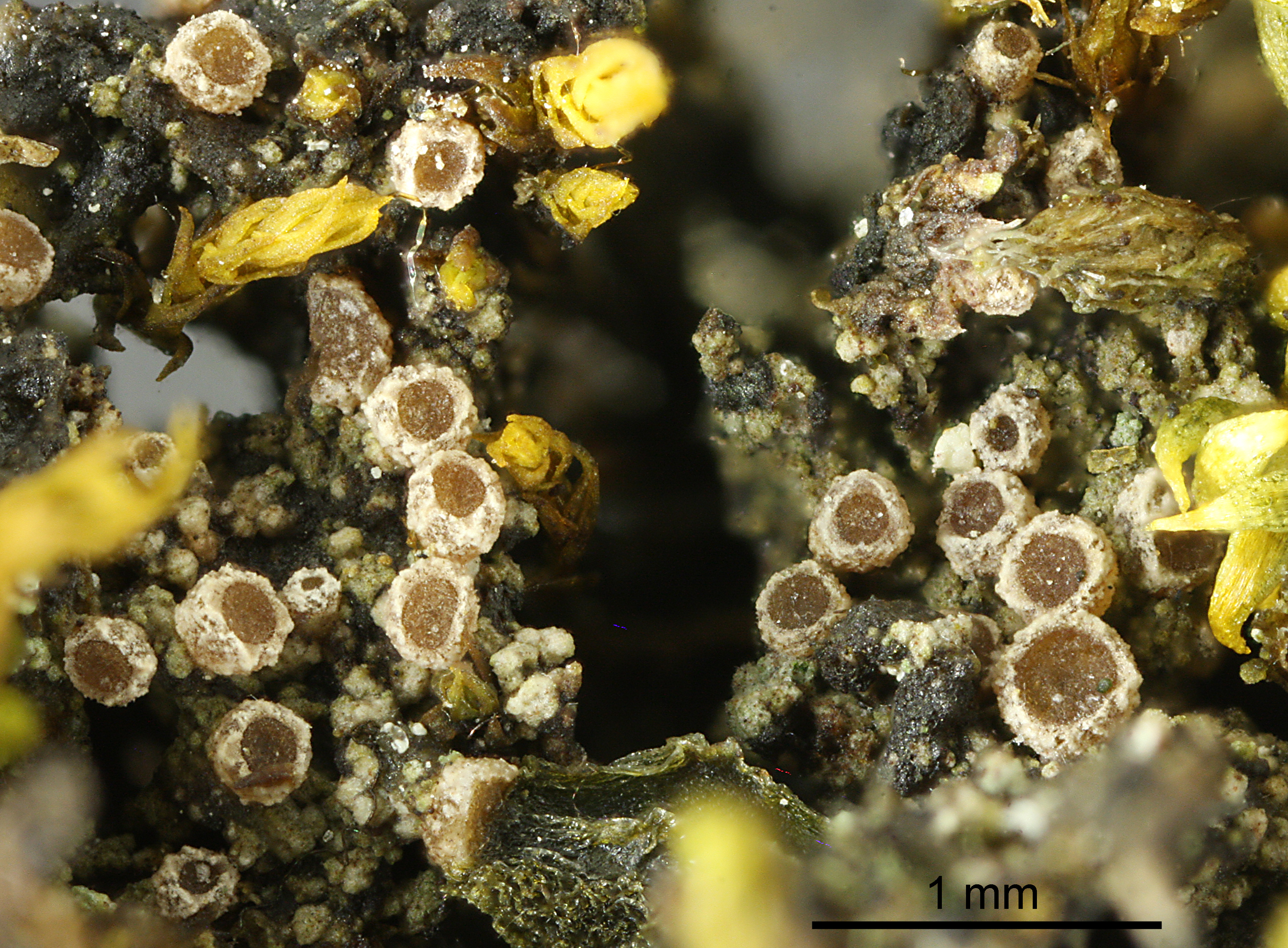
- scale: 1 mm

Scientific classification
- Kingdom: Fungi
- Division: Ascomycota
- Order: Thelocarpales
- Family: Thelocarpaceae
- Genus: Sarcosagium; A.Massal. (1856)
- Species: S. campestre

Binomial name
- Sarcosagium campestre (Fr.) Poetsch & Schied. (1872)

Synonyms
- Biatora campestris Fr. (1822); Biatorella campestris (Fr.) Th. Fr. (1874); Sarea campestris (Fr.) Kuntze (1898); Biatorella fossarum var. campestris (Fr.) Boistel (1903); Sarcosagium campestre var. macrosporum Coppins & P.James (1979)

= Sarcosagium =

Single-species fungal genus

Sarcosagium is a genus of crustose lichen-forming fungi in the family Thelocarpaceae. Established by the Italian lichenologist Abramo Bartolommeo Massalongo in 1856, it is currently regarded as a monotypic genus containing the single species Sarcosagium campestre. It is characterized by its inconspicuous, often gelatinous thallus and minute, reddish-brown, barrel-shaped apothecia. Its unusual morphology led to its placement in various groups historically, but genomic analyses have situated the genus within the Lichinomycetes, an ancient lineage of symbiotic ascomycetes. Its precise familial classification, however, remains a matter of ongoing discussion.

An ephemeral pioneer species, S. campestre typically colonizes transient or disturbed habitats such as acidic soils, decaying mosses, and urban wasteland across Europe and North America. It shows a high tolerance to heavy metals, frequently appearing on mine spoil heaps and tailings ponds enriched with zinc, lead, and copper. The species exhibits a distinct seasonal phenology, behaving as an autumn ephemerophyte (a species with short-lived fruiting bodies), with apothecia that emerge in late summer and disappear by winter. Because of its small size and preference for neglected anthropogenic sites, it is believed to be more widespread than current records suggest.

== Taxonomy and systematics ==
Abramo Bartolommeo Massalongo established the genus Sarcosagium in the journal Flora in 1856 as part of a series describing new lichen taxa. In his protologue, he described the genus as having open apothecia arising from the thallus, verruciform to conical-truncate fruiting bodies, a gelatinous disc, a coloured hypothecium, polysporous asci with very numerous minute spores (myriospores), and slender, branched paraphyses intermixed with gonidia (algal cells). He characterized the thallus as crustose and homeomerous (with the photobiont distributed uniformly throughout the thallus rather than in a distinct layer), closely attached to the substrate, cracked into small patches (areolate) and warty (verrucose) to minutely scaly (squamulose) when dry, and swollen when moist. Massalongo compared the new genus with several existing genera, remarking on resemblances to Collema, Gyalecta, and Biatora, and he initially placed it within the family Collemaceae, creating the tribe Sarcosagieae to accommodate it while acknowledging its uncertain classification.

The sole species described by Massalongo was Sarcosagium biatorellum, based on material collected among mosses at Bolca in the Province of Verona, Italy, on 25 September 1855. The species now accepted in the genus, S. campestre, is based on Biatora campestris, originally described by Elias Magnus Fries in 1822. The combination Sarcosagium campestre was published by Ignaz Sigismund Poetsch and Karl Schiedermayr in 1872, and the species has also been placed in Biatorella as Biatorella campestris (Fr.) Th.Fr.. Other names applied to the taxon include Biatorella sarcosagium, Sarea campestris, and Biatorella fossarum var. campestris.

Cannon, Coppins, and Simkin (2025) treat Sarcosagium as a monotypic genus, with the species account of S. campestre also constituting the generic description. In ITALIC 8.0, S. biatorellum is treated as a synonym of S. campestre, together with names such as Biatorella campestris and Biatorella sarcosagium. Some nomenclatural databases nevertheless maintain separate records for S. campestre and S. biatorellum, reflecting their publication as distinct names even though recent floras treat them as synonyms.

Sarcosagium is usually classified in the Thelocarpaceae, the only family in the order Thelocarpales, alongside the larger genus Thelocarpon. The order Thelocarpales was proposed by Robert Lücking and H. Thorsten Lumbsch in 2016 to accommodate these ephemeral, multispored lichens. Earlier molecular analyses placed Sarcosagium campestre and allied polysporous taxa in varying positions near or sister to the Lichinomycetes, reflecting long-standing uncertainty in the higher-level classification of the group. Genome-level analyses published in 2022 supported placement of the Thelocarpaceae within the Lichinomycetes, which those authors resolved as an ancient lineage of symbiotic ascomycetes. Cannon and colleagues (2025) nevertheless noted that there is still some doubt as to whether Sarcosagium truly belongs in the Thelocarpaceae, even though it appears to fall within the Lichinomycetes.

Sarcosagium is distinguished from Thelocarpon by its apothecial ascomata with barrel-shaped to convex fruiting bodies and an exciple with reddish pigments, whereas Thelocarpon has mostly perithecial ascomata with a colourless exciple and often yellow pruina. It can be separated from Biatorella (Biatorellaceae, Lecanorales), which has larger, immarginate apothecia with little exciple visible in section, and from Biatoridium, which has asci with multilayered walls.

== Description ==
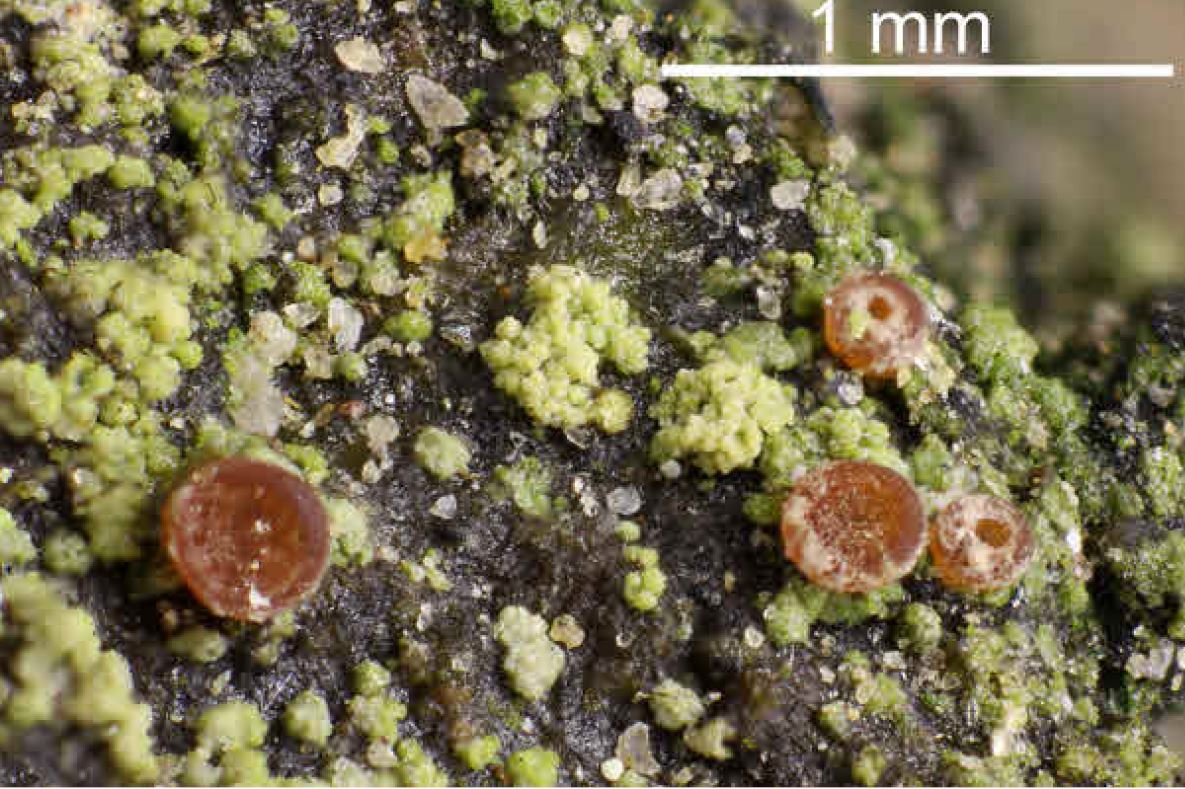
Minute reddish-brown apothecia of Sarcosagium campestre on rabbit dung and detritus in a former limestone quarry near Haan-Gruiten, North Rhine–Westphalia, Germany

The thallus of Sarcosagium campestre is a thin, often inconspicuous crust, which ranges in colour from greenish or green-grey to blackish-brown. It may be more or less gelatinous when moist and can be reduced to scattered granules or an indeterminate dark crust in the field. In the protologue of S. biatorellum, the thallus was described as a very thin, spreading crust that became greenish-brown and semitranslucent when wet. The photobiont is chlorococcoid.

The apothecia are 0.1–0.3 (sometimes up to 0.5) mm in diameter, sessile, barrel-shaped to convex, and dark red-brown, becoming translucent when wet. The disc is flat or slightly concave and opens with age to become cup-like, while the exciple is well developed, the same colour as the disc, and often thinly grey-pruinose. Massalongo described the young apothecia as punctiform (point-like) and flesh-coloured before they opened more fully and the disc became evident. The hymenium is 120–170 micrometres (μm) tall, and both the epithecium and hypothecium are colourless or pale yellow. The paraphyses are unbranched or sparingly branched, lax in K, with swollen apices.

The asci (spore-bearing cells) are cylindrical and thin-walled. They lack an apical dome and turn blue when treated with iodine (K/I+). The ascospores are colourless, thin-walled, ellipsoidal to elongate-cylindrical, and usually aseptate, measuring 5–8 × 2–2.3 μm in modern accounts. In the protologue, the spores were described as ovoid-oblong and measured 6.1–9.0 μm long by about 2–4 μm wide. No secondary metabolites (lichen products) have been detected using thin-layer chromatography, and standard chemical spot tests yield negative results.

A variety, S. campestre var. macrosporum Coppins & P.James (1979), has been described with consistently longer ascospores of 7–13 × 2–3 μm. It has been reported from metalliferous mine spoil and calcareous sand dunes, although its taxonomic status requires further study.

== Habitat and ecology ==
Sarcosagium campestre is an ephemeral pioneer, colonizing temporary or disturbed habitats where there is little competition from other species. Typical substrates include base-rich or acidic soils, decaying mosses, walls, paths, quarry floors, urban wasteland, and mine spoil heaps. In Eastern and East-Central Europe it has been described as a characteristic lichen of neglected habitats such as roadside scarps, edges of dirt roads, and sand-, gravel-, and loam-pits, where its apparent rarity may partly reflect under-recording. It has also been recorded growing on decaying lichen thalli, including Peltigera didactyla and species of Collema, as well as on rotting wood and other detritus.

The species is frequently associated with metalliferous habitats rich in heavy metals. In southern Poland, it has been recorded from abandoned zinc-lead mining areas on the Silesian-Kraków Upland, growing on soil and bryophytes on zinc- and lead-enriched substrates. In Maine, United States, it was collected from the fine-textured, metal-enriched, waterlogged soils of the tailings pond at the Callahan Mine, a copper- and zinc-enriched Superfund site, where it was treated as one of the indicator species for sites important for metal-tolerant lichens. In Bavaria, it has been found in open calcareous semi-dry grasslands on nutrient-poor raw soils over calcareous gravel, in early successional stages of restored habitats.

A three-year phenological study of S. campestre on disused lead mine spoil heaps in the Peak District, Derbyshire, found that the species behaves as an autumn ephemerophyte, an example of an ephemeral lichen with a short life cycle and a generation length of about 1–3 years. Its apothecia pass through four stages of development: a bud phase, in which tiny pink pruinose buds emerge; a mature phase, in which pink or purplish barrel-shaped apothecia with ripe asci are present; a white phase, in which the apothecia become cup-shaped and change colour through orange to dirty white; and an empty phase, in which the thecium gelatinizes and disperses, leaving an empty white cup that also soon disappears. Apothecia typically begin forming in late summer and reach maturity in autumn. They then age and decay during winter; consequently, the species is usually impossible to find in the field during spring and early summer. Each phase lasts about three months, and although individual thalli can persist for at least three years, the apothecia themselves are short-lived. A survey of herbarium specimens at the Natural History Museum, London and the Royal Botanic Garden Edinburgh confirmed this seasonal pattern nationally, with 85% of 33 collections made between July and December and a marked peak in September and October.

== Distribution ==
Sarcosagium campestre has been recorded from scattered localities across Europe and northeastern North America, although its distribution remains poorly understood because the species is inconspicuous and associated with habitats that are seldom surveyed by lichenologists. In Italy, where the type was originally collected, records of S. campestre are scattered across northern and central regions.

The species is local but widespread across the British Isles. In Eastern and East-Central European lowlands, it has been reported from Poland, Lithuania, Latvia, Estonia, and Ukraine, and has been considered one of the transient-habitat lichens with the broadest west-to-east distribution in the region. Additional regional records include Belarus, European Russia, and Ukrainian localities in Kherson, Sumy, and Crimea. In Germany, it has been recorded from Bavaria, and von Brackel and Kocourková also cited occurrences outside Germany from Prague in the Czech Republic and Karelia in Russia.

In North America, the species is known from the northeastern United States. Medeiros and co-authors reported it from the Callahan Mine in Brooksville, Maine, noting that this was the first documented modern record for New England since a 1938 collection from Vermont.
