= Thelocarpon triseptatum =

Scientific classification
- Kingdom: Fungi
- Division: Ascomycota
- Order: Thelocarpales
- Family: Thelocarpaceae
- Genus: Thelocarpon
- Species: T. triseptatum

Binomial name
- Thelocarpon triseptatum Aptroot & M.Cáceres (2016)
- Holotype: Macapá, Brazil

Species of lichen

Thelocarpon triseptatum is a wood-dwelling lichen in the family Thelocarpaceae. This lichen was discovered in 2016 growing on dead wood in savanna vegetation near Macapá in northern Brazil. It forms a close partnership with colonies of green algae, creating tiny, pale fruiting structures that contain spores divided by three cross-walls.

== Taxonomy ==
Thelocarpon triseptatum was described as new to science in 2016 by André Aptroot and Marcela da Silva Cáceres from material collected near Macapá, Amapá (northern Brazil). The holotype was gathered on wood in savanna vegetation near Povoado Abacate da Pedreina at about 30 m elevation; the specific epithet refers to the species' 3-septate ascospores. In their discussion, the authors noted that, although it lacks the yellow pruina seen in many other members of its genus, its hamathecium, ascus features, and wall structure firmly place it in Thelocarpon. They also emphasized its intimate association with algal colonies and judged it to be lichenized rather than parasitic.

== Description ==
The thallus of T. triseptatum is inconspicuous, forming a thin, pale film or a few scattered hyphae on weathered wood. The ascomata occur in close contact with colonies of green algae (chiefly Klebsormidium and Gloeocystis) growing on the wood surface. Fertile structures are tiny, pallid, perithecioid ascomata (0.2–0.3 mm diam.) with a distinctly flat apex; the wall thickens markedly around the apical ostiole. The hamathecium comprises very thin, sparsely anastomosing paraphysoids immersed in a gel. Asci are cylindrical (95–160 × 5–7 μm) and contain eight translucent (hyaline) ascospores. Each spore is narrowly ellipsoid, three-septate, 12–16 × 3.5–4.5 μm, and lacks any thickened end-cells.

== Habitat and distribution ==
The species is known only from its type locality near Abacate da Pedreina, Amapá State, northern Brazil, where it grows on dead wood within lowland savanna vegetation at about 30 m elevation.
