= Metallurgy during the Copper Age in Europe =

Prehistoric period, Copper Age

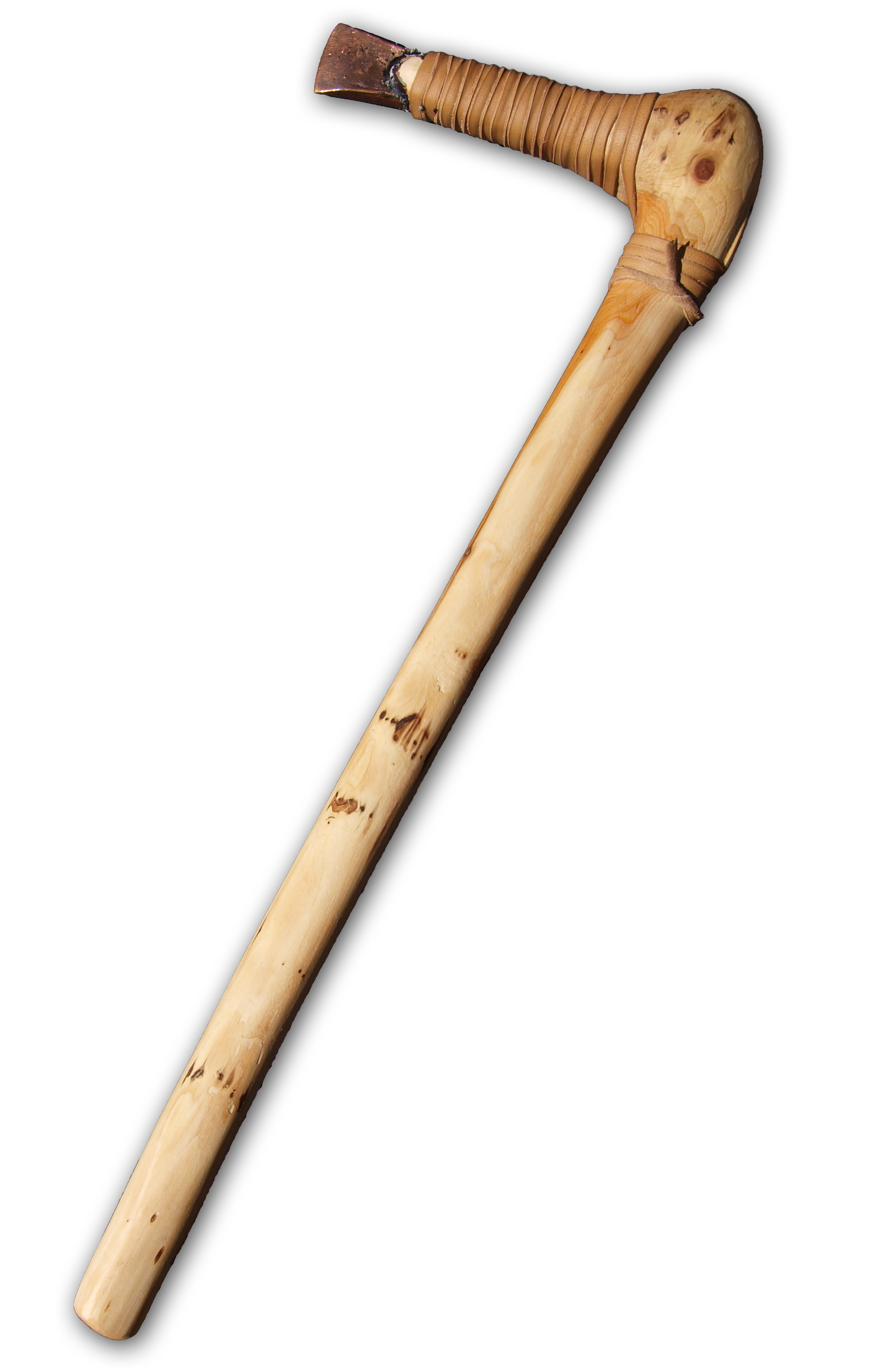
Reconstruction of Ötzi's copper axe (c. 3300 BCE)

The Copper Age, also called the Eneolithic or the Chalcolithic Age, has been traditionally understood as a transitional period between the Neolithic and the Bronze Age, in which a gradual introduction of the metal (native copper) took place, while stone was still the main resource utilized. Recent archaeology has found that the metal was not introduced so gradually and that this entailed significant social changes, such as developments in the type of habitation (larger villages, launching of fortifications), long-distance trade, and copper metallurgy.

Some of the earliest Copper Age artifacts were found in the 5th and 6th millennia BCE archaeological sites of the Vinča culture such as Majdanpek, Jarmovac and Pločnik (including a copper axe from 5500 BCE). Somewhat later, in the 5th millennium BCE, metalwork is attested at Rudna Glava mine in Serbia, and at Ai Bunar mine in Bulgaria.

3rd millennium BCE copper metalwork is attested in places like Palmela (Portugal), Cortes (Navarre), and Stonehenge (England). However, as often happens with the prehistoric times, the limits of the age cannot be clearly defined and vary between different sources.

== Inception of metallurgy in Europe ==
The theory that metallurgy was imported into Europe from the Near East has been practically ruled out. A second hypothesis, that there were two main points of origin of metallurgy in Europe, in southern Spain and in West Bulgaria, is also doubtful due to the existence of sites outside the centers of diffusion where metallurgy was known simultaneously with, or before, those in the 'original' nuclei, such as Brixlegg (Tyrol, Austria), while sites closer to the supposed origins of metallurgy, such as in the north of Spain, show fewer metal artifacts than sites in the south and practically no evidence of production.

Currently, the general opinion is that the development of metallurgy took place independently in different places, at different times, with various techniques. One fact that supports this interpretation is that, although the final products (beads, rings, sickles, swords, axes, etc.) are quite similar throughout Europe, the method of production is not. Thus the use of crucibles was the technique utilized in the south of Spain, whereas central Europe employed a slagging process, but Cabrierés (France) used a primitive oxidizing non-slagging process, while in the British Isles the absence of debris, slag or ceramic suggests another technique.

Consequently, the way in which metallurgy was initiated differs considerably depending on the region. There are areas in which copper seems to play a crucial role (i.e., the Balkans), whereas other areas show no interest in it at all. Then there are societies that use copper artifacts, but do not practice metallurgy, and there are other ones that fully adopt some of the cultural innovations but ignore the rest. One example of the latter is Basque country in northern Spain, where splendid large dolmens are present along the Ebro river, but metal is rather infrequent, and when it does appear between the trapping, it is more often bronze or arsenical copper than copper.

== Reasons to use copper ==
Copper is the eighth most abundant metal in the Earth's crust, is available all over the world, and is one of the few that can appear in a pure state. It is not complicated to work with, and a bare hammering can be enough to transform a nugget into a bead. The eye-catching look of native copper makes it easy to recognize, and even flashier if converted into jewelry, a possible motivation for humankind to start metallurgy with it. An evolutive technological process has been described, although there are authors like Javinovic, who think that it is not necessary to pass through the first stages to reach the last one.

=== Converting copper ===
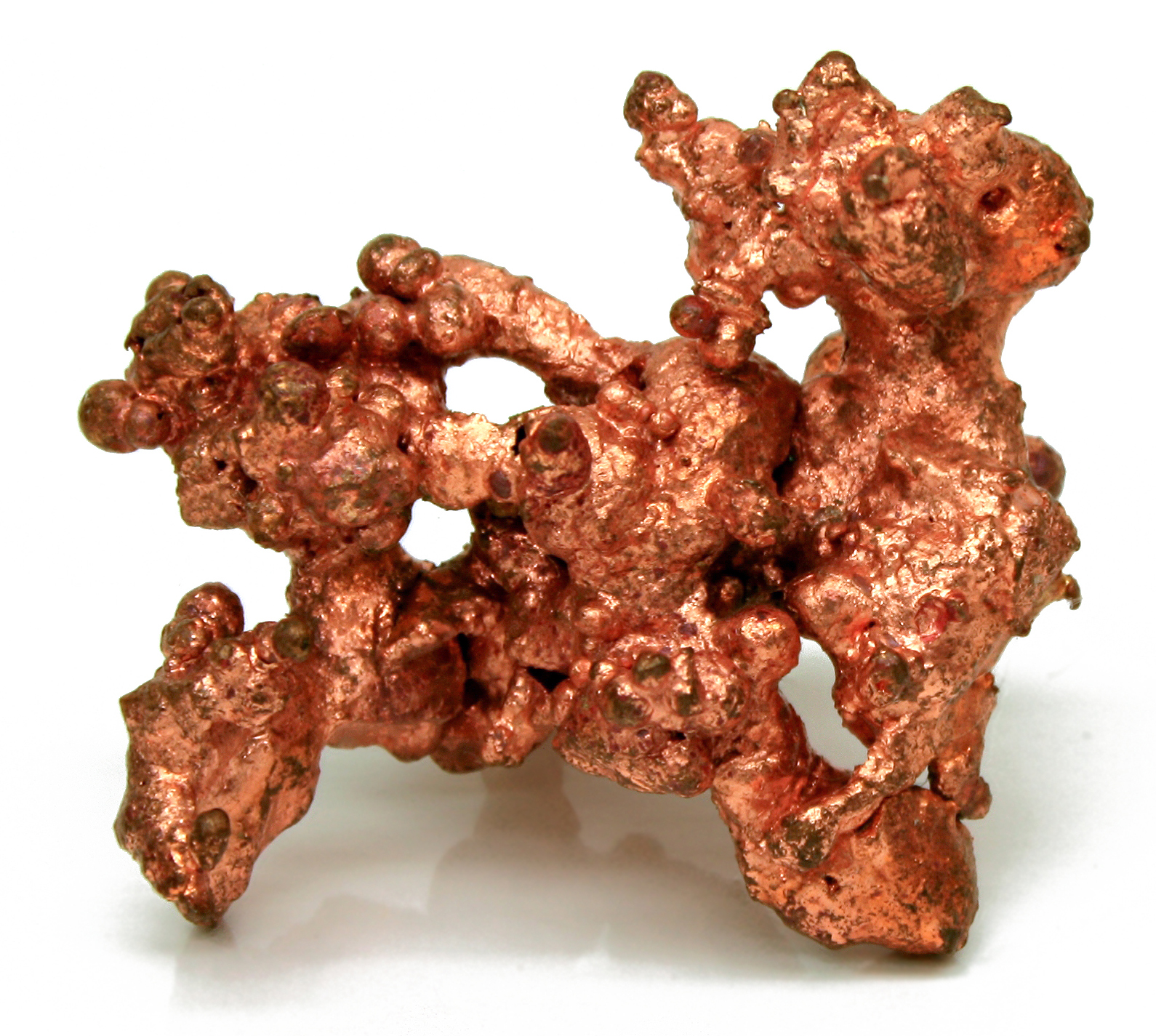
Sample of native copper.

To start with, the raw material must be obtained. Copper can be found in over 160 different minerals, but mining activities are entailed to obtain them in large quantities if a reasonable amount of copper is wanted. Some of the most commonly exploited minerals are cuprite, malachite, azurite, chalcopyrite, chrysocolla and tennantite; e.g. malachite was extracted in Rudna Glava (Serbia), Cabrierés (France) or Chinflón (Riotinto, Spain). In fact, one of the possible explanations about what Ötzi the Iceman, the ancient mummy found in the Alps who lived around 3300 years BCE, was doing at 3,210 metres (10,530 ft) of altitude is that he could have been prospecting for new ores of minerals.

Secondly, the mineral is separated from the gangue. This is only possible by smelting or beneficiation. To do so, it is necessary to use a furnace that is able to reach at least 1,089 °C (1,992 °F).

Lastly, a wide range of specific tools and resources have to be available, such as furnaces, moulds, crucibles, mauls, etc.

- Stage A: Although native copper nowadays is frequently displayed in museum showcases of mineral collections, it once occurred copiously during prehistoric times. In Cyprus or Crete, collecting the mineral was once as easy as simply picking it up from the ground. In fact, native copper is no longer as easy to find in that state these days. The treatment of this native mineral was also uncomplicated through cold-hammering. This only permitted the production of a limited range of artifacts like awls, pins, or beads. In larger objects, the metal cracks when it is cold-hammered.
- Stage B: Annealing the metal on an open fire (200–300 °C or 390–570 °F is hot enough) reduces its hardness considerably and gives in malleability. This permits the manufacture of slightly more sophisticated objects, like bracelets, but is still a rather limited technique.
- Stage C: In the first two steps, the material used was native copper that does not actually need specialized technology. Probably, due to the situation that native copper was increasingly difficult to find, copper ore is used in this third step. This is a very significant development. In fact, this is truly the beginning of the metallurgy, as the mineral has to be smelted to separate the copper from the gangue, requiring technology.

== Early mining in Europe ==
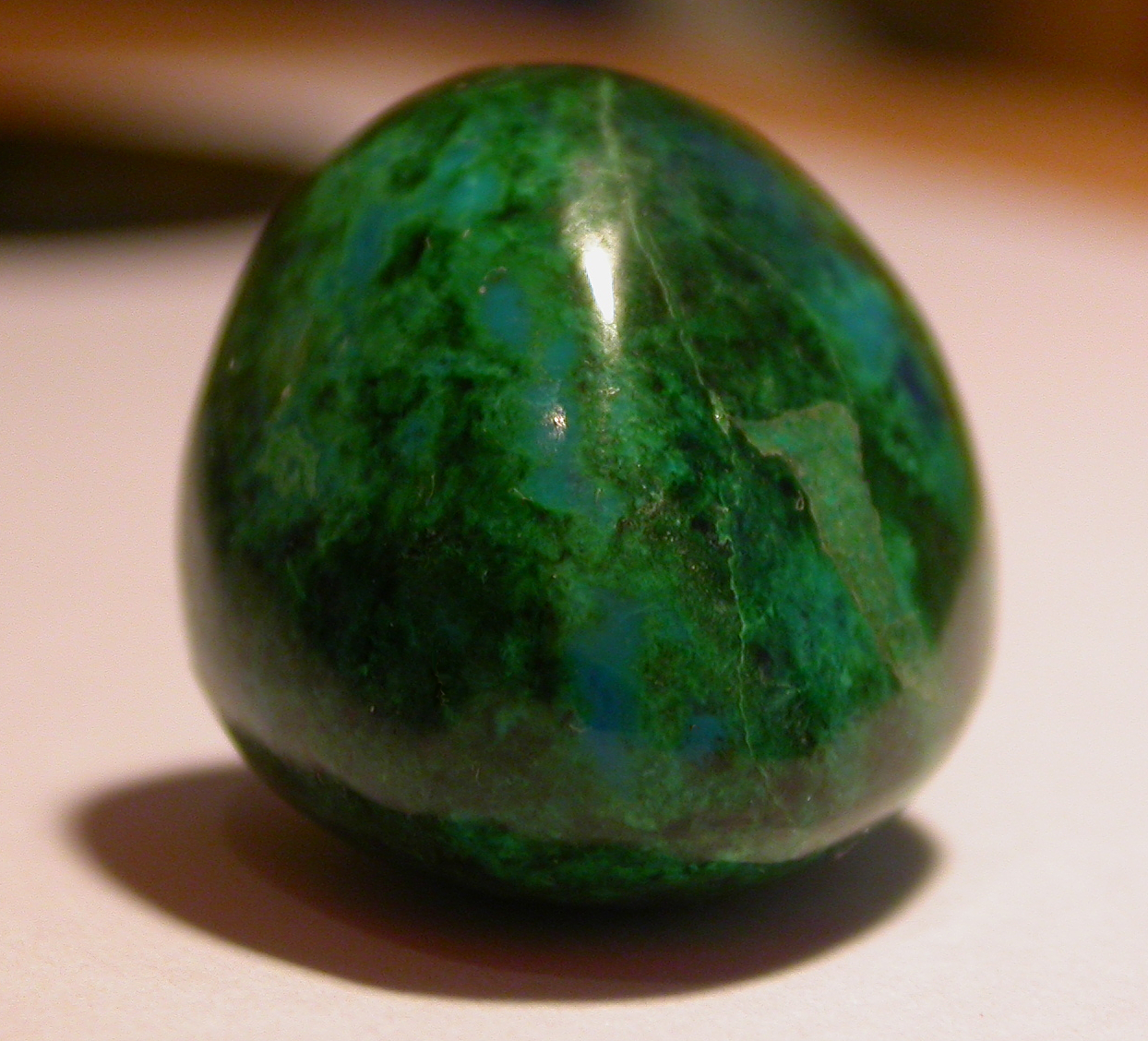
Polished chrysocolla.

Minerals of copper were known from ancient times. In Crete, little fragments of malachite and azurite were powdered and used as make up or to decorate ceramic as early as 6000 BCE.

Therefore, the minerals were not collected because people were looking for copper but for virtues like those mentioned or simply because of its brightness and colour, but this knowledge of the minerals is critical since they already knew how to recognize them and where to collect them when, later, they started the systematic search for ores.

Numerous examples of mines are known all over Europe, from the east: Rudna Glava (Serbia), Ai Bunar (Bulgaria); to the west: Mount Gabriel (Ireland), Great Orme, Alderley Edge (United Kingdom); crossing Central Europe: Mitterberg (Salzach, Austria), Neuchâtel (Switzerland), Cabrierés (France); to the south: Riotinto, Mola Alta de Serelles (Spain); and the Mediterranean: Corsica, Cyprus, and the Cyclades islands. It is remarkable that, usually, it is not a single mine but a complex, with a variable, large number of mineshafts, as in Rudna Glava (30) or Mount Gabriel (31).

== Techniques and tools ==
The techniques observed in all of them are quite similar. Basically they used the thermic alteration or firesetting (Mohen 1992, Craddock 1995, Eiroa et al. 1996, Timberlake 2003). This consists of applying fire to the rock and then pouring water over it: the rapid changes of temperature will cause cracks within the rocks that can be totally broken with the help of mauls and picks. Then the useful masses were selected, crushed and transported to the production centre that could be in the surrounding area (Mitterberg) or far away (Rudna Glava).

The mines were exploited in extremely efficient and clever ways, according to the technology available (Jovanovic 1980, Craddock 1995, Timberlake 2003). The entire convenient mineral was collected and the abandoned shafts carefully refilled with gangue and rocks (Mohen 1992; 85). For example, at Mount Gabriel, it was estimated that they extracted the astonishing number of 32,570.15 tonnes (35,902.44 tons) of rock, gangue and ore. The usable amount of copper was 162.85 tonnes and the final smelting finished metal was 146.56 tonnes (Jackson 1980; 24). The entire process was thoroughly described in 1744 by Lewis Morris, Crown Mineral Agent for Cardiganshire, and, incidentally, antiquarian.

Their method seems to be this. They make a great fire of wood in the bottom of their rakes which were always open up on that account, and when the rock was sufficiently hot they cast water upon it, which shiver'd it; and then with stone wedges, which they drove in with other stones, they work'd their way through the hardest rocks, tho' but slowly.

The tools employed are mainly presented in Lewis' observations, but other ones have been recovered in archaeological context:

- Stone tools: The most frequent find are the stone hammers, normally made of hard rocks accessible to the mine, beach or river pebbles. There is no standardization of these mauls but is common a system of hafting, usually a groove carved in the middle for where a rope was tied to the handle, like the twisted hazel recovered in Copa Hill.
- Antler and bone tools: Picks and scrapes made of bone and antlers have been found in the majority of the mines.
- Wood: Evidence of wooden tools are more infrequent. Nevertheless, in places like Ai Bunar or Mount Gabriel were recovered shovels and wedges. A rudimentary system of stairs or scaffoldings can be supposed (Mohen 1992).
- Metal: The use of any metallic tool is rather strange and extraordinary. It seems that the copper was not used for the miners' tools. However copper chisels and discarded axes could be utilized as wedges.
- Other evidence: The presence of coal and charcoal, crucial for the firing (fire-setting) and furnace (fuel), is habitual. Leather sacks (at Ai Bunar) and shoulder baskets (at Copa Hill) were used to transport the crushed mineral.

== Society ==
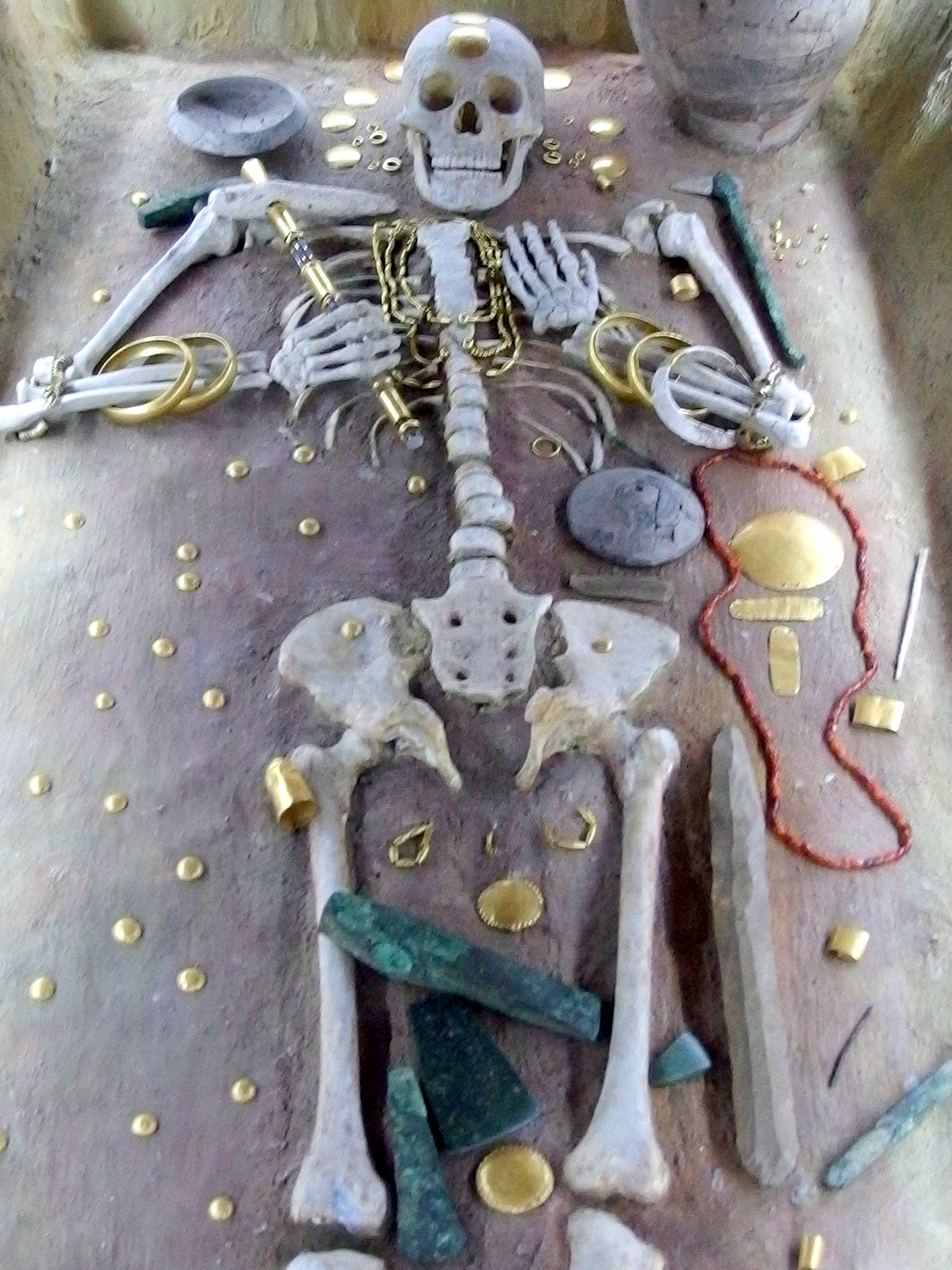
Elite male tomb, Varna culture (Bulgaria), 4500 BCE

The information available about the people of the Copper Age has not substantially increased along with the number of archaeological sites. Several ideas have been proffered, one of the most followed is that the metal itself did not bring abrupt transformation into the people's life, or even more that early copper does not produce anything useful at all, meaning with this that with the copper, they produced mainly jewellery and, overall, weapons that obviously were not within reach of the majority of the population but only to privileged individuals. In other words, the real importance of the metal is not utilitarian but social. This is a suitable explanation about the rising of Great Cultures of Metal such as Vinča culture (Ex-Yugoslavia) Tiszapolgar, Remedello and Rinaldone (Italy), Montagne Noire (France), El Argar and Targas (Spain), etc.

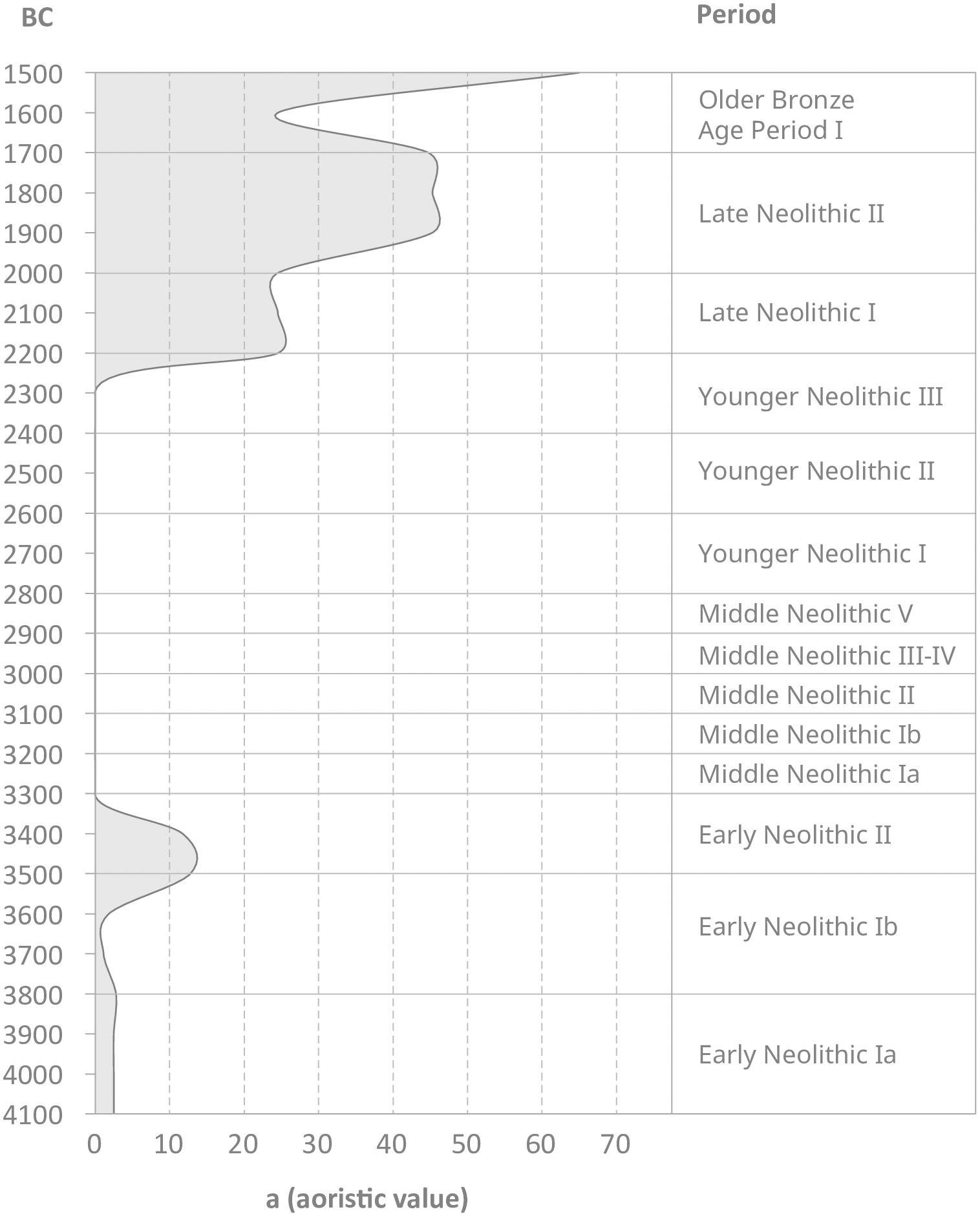
The number of metal in northern Germany. After a first peak between 3500 - 3300 BC, nmetal has not been recorded any longer for thousand years, when the Bronze Age starts.

Between 4000 and 3300 BC, copper artefacts, mainly from Serbian mines, reached northern Germany and southern Scandinavia. The metal was probably redistributed by groups in the eastern Alps. Societies of the Funnel Beaker Culture in the north of central and northern Europe were able to cast the copper into different types and they deposited it mainly in hoards. There is no reason to believe that copper was the exclusive preserve of privileged individuals. In contrast to the aforementioned regions, copper artefacts had a more symbolic value.

As the period moved forward, especially around the 3rd millennium, new and complex realities would appear strongly linked to the metal, like the impressive fortified villages of Los Millares (Spain), Vila Nova de Sao Pedro (Portugal) or the more modest cairn next to Copa Hill in the United Kingdom destinated to control the centres of extraction, or the equally and generalized cultural phenomenons of Megalithism, Rock Art, Bell Beakers Vessels that are known from Scandinavia to the South of Spain and from Scotland to Turkey.

== See also ==
- Copper
- Copper Age
- Copper metallurgy in Africa
- Metallurgy
- Native copper
