= Thelocarpon immersum =

Scientific classification
- Kingdom: Fungi
- Division: Ascomycota
- Order: Thelocarpales
- Family: Thelocarpaceae
- Genus: Thelocarpon
- Species: T. immersum

Binomial name
- Thelocarpon immersum Fryday (2020)

Species of lichen

Thelocarpon immersum is a little-known species of lichen in the family Thelocarpaceae. It is found in Alaska. Discovered in 2020 in Glacier Bay National Park and Preserve, this lichen grows on soil in wet, lime-rich meadows and is known only from its original collection site in Alaska. It is characterized by tiny, flask-shaped fruiting bodies that remain almost completely buried in a mat of algae, with only their tips visible at the surface.

== Taxonomy ==
The lichen was described as a new species in 2020 by the lichenologist Alan Fryday. The type specimen was collected in the Hoonah–Angoon Census Area of Glacier Bay National Park and Preserve. Here the lichen was found near the park entrance growing on soil in a calcareous wet meadow in a glacial outwash plain. The specific epithet immersum refers to the perithecioid nature of its ascomata (fruiting bodies), which are immersed in "a mat of cyanobacteria and chlorococcoid algae, with only the tips protruding". The lichen is only known its type locality.

== Description ==
Thelocarpon immersum forms minute, flask-shaped fruiting bodies (ascomata) that remain almost completely buried in the lichen's algal mat. Each yellow-green ascoma measures only 0.08–0.12 mm across and pierces the surface just at its apex, giving the thallus a pitted appearance. The wall that surrounds the cavity (excipulum) is clear except for its uppermost 100 μm, which is tinged yellow-brown. Short, simple filaments called periphyses line the neck of the ascoma and project 30–40 μm into the pore.

Under the microscope the spore-bearing layer (hymenium) reacts with iodine to a deep orange-brown (I+). Slender supporting filaments (paraphyses) thread the hymenium; they are 80–100 μm long and only about 1 μm wide, branching sparingly and occasionally fusing with each other. The spore sacs (asci) begin cylindrical (75–90 × 15–17 μm) with a narrow upper tip but later broaden into a club shape up to 20 μm wide; their walls stain orange-brown with iodine, while the interior contents stain yellow. Each ascus contains eight round ascospores, 5–7 μm in diameter, that also give a yellow iodine reaction. No asexual propagules have been observed, and all standard lichen spot tests are negative, indicating that the species lacks the common secondary metabolites often used in field identification.
