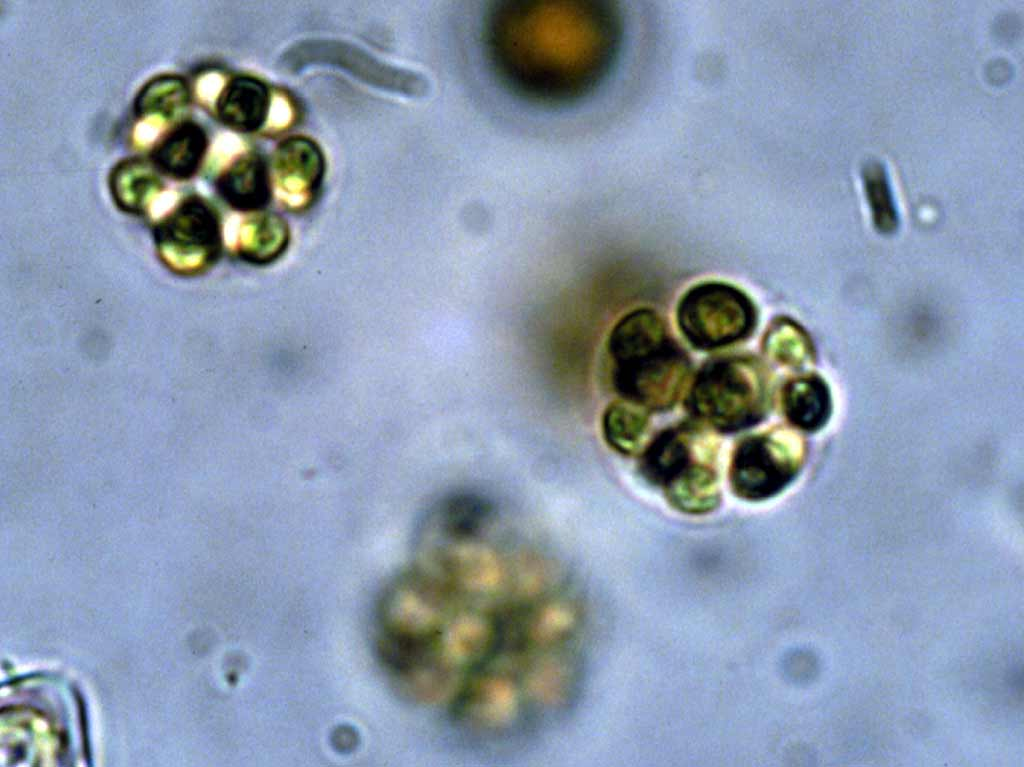
- Sphaerocystis schroeteri

Scientific classification
- Clade: Viridiplantae
- Division: Chlorophyta
- Class: Chlorophyceae
- Order: Chlamydomonadales
- Family: Sphaerocystidaceae
- Genus: Sphaerocystis; R. Chodat, 1897

Type species
- Sphaerocystis schroeteri Chodat, 1897

Species
- Sphaerocystis mucosus; Sphaerocystis oleifera; Sphaerocystis planctonica; Sphaerocystis schroeteri

= Sphaerocystis =

Genus of algae

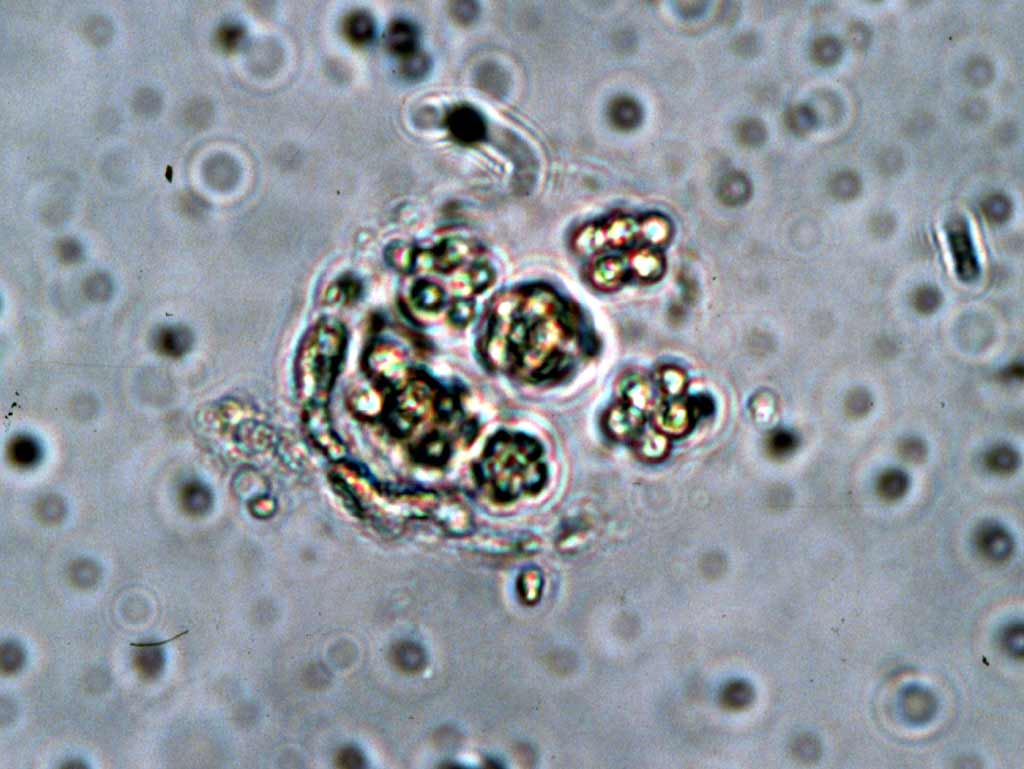
Sphaerocystis schroeteri

Sphaerocystis is a genus of green algae, specifically of the class Chlorophyceae. It is found as plankton in freshwater habitats.

Sphaerocystis consists of cells embedded in spherical, gelatinous colonies up to 1 mm in diameter. The cells are spherical, 4 to 64 in a colony. They are individually dispersed within the colony matrix, or clustered in mucilage in groups of 4 or more. Cells have one nucleus and a single parietal chloroplast with a single pyrenoid.

Reproduction in Sphaerocystis occurs by the formation of autospores or zoospores. Autospores are formed in twos, fours, or eights and are released by the dissolution of the parent cell wall. Zoospores have two apical flagella and have a single cup-shaped chloroplast with a pyrenoid.

Sphaerocystis is similar in morphology to other genera, namely Coenochloris, Coenococcus, and Coenocystis. The morphological characters used to separate the genera are currently unclear.
