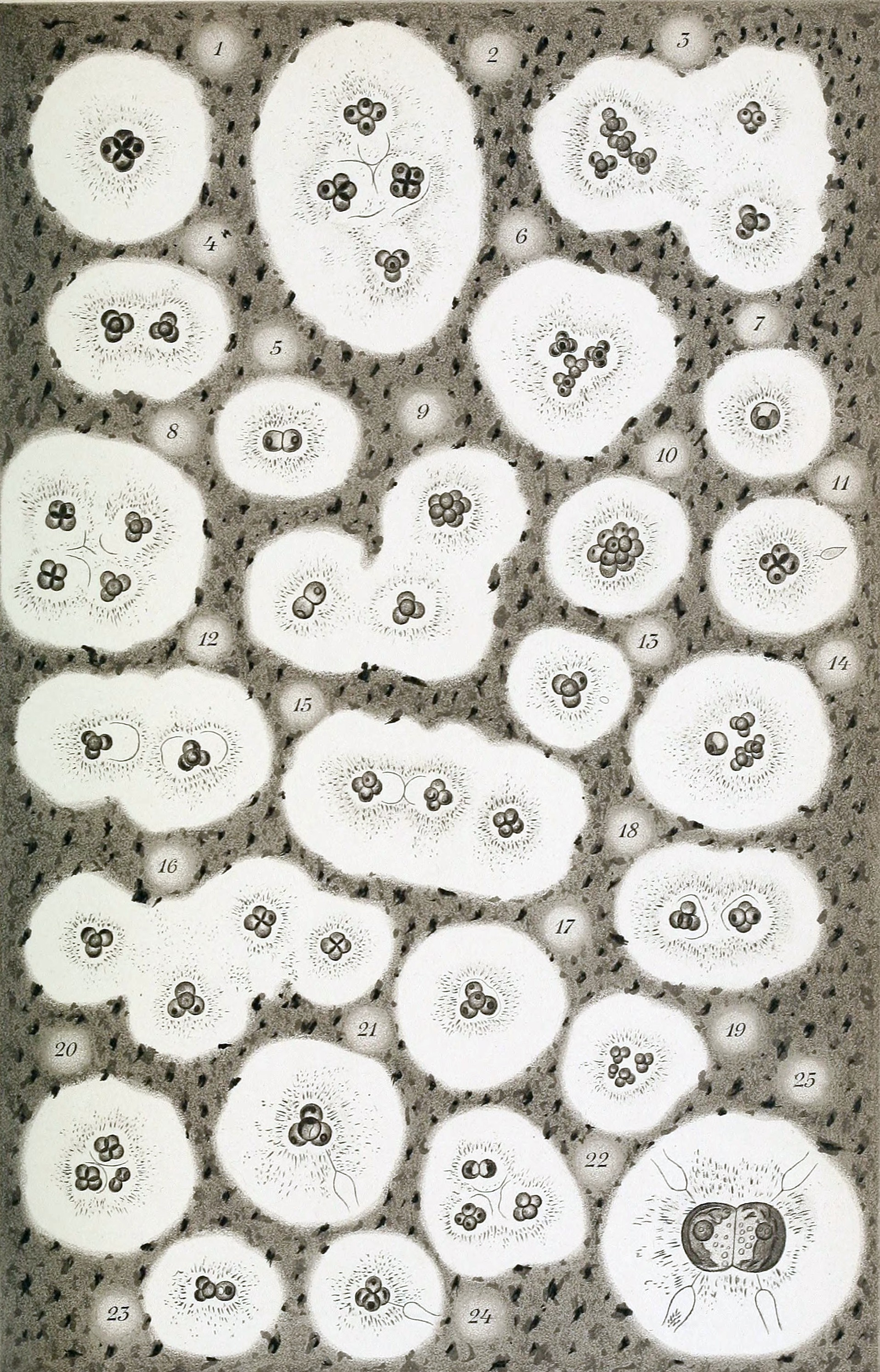
- Radiococcus nimbatus

Scientific classification
- Kingdom: Plantae
- Division: Chlorophyta
- Class: Chlorophyceae
- Order: Sphaeropleales
- Family: Radiococcaceae
- Genus: Radiococcus; Schmidle, 1902

Type species
- Radiococcus nimbatus (De Wildeman) Schmidle

Species
- Radiococcus bavaricus; Radiococcus bilobatus; Radiococcus nimbatus; Radiococcus planktonicus; Radiococcus polycoccus; Radiococcus signiensis; Radiococcus sphaericus; Radiococcus wildemannii

= Radiococcus =

Genus of algae

Radiococcus is a genus of green algae in the family Radiococcaceae. It is found in the plankton of freshwater habitats.

Radiococcus consists of colonies of cells embedded in a mucilage; the mucilage may have radial striations. Cells are 3–15 μm in diameter, often grouped into tetrads or arranged in a ring. The cell walls are mostly smooth, although in some species they may be warty (verrucose). Cells have a single nucleus and a single parietal chloroplast with one pyrenoid.

Radiococcus reproduces asexually via the formation of autospores. Four to eight autospores are produced per sporangium; they are released when the mother cell wall fragments. Cell wall fragments remain in the mucilage for some time before dissolving.

Radiococcus is considered an ill-defined genus in need of taxonomic revision. It is similar to Planktosphaeria, which has multiple chloroplasts per cell, and Korschpalmella, which lacks pyrenoids.
