= Mitterberg-Sankt Martin =

- Municipality
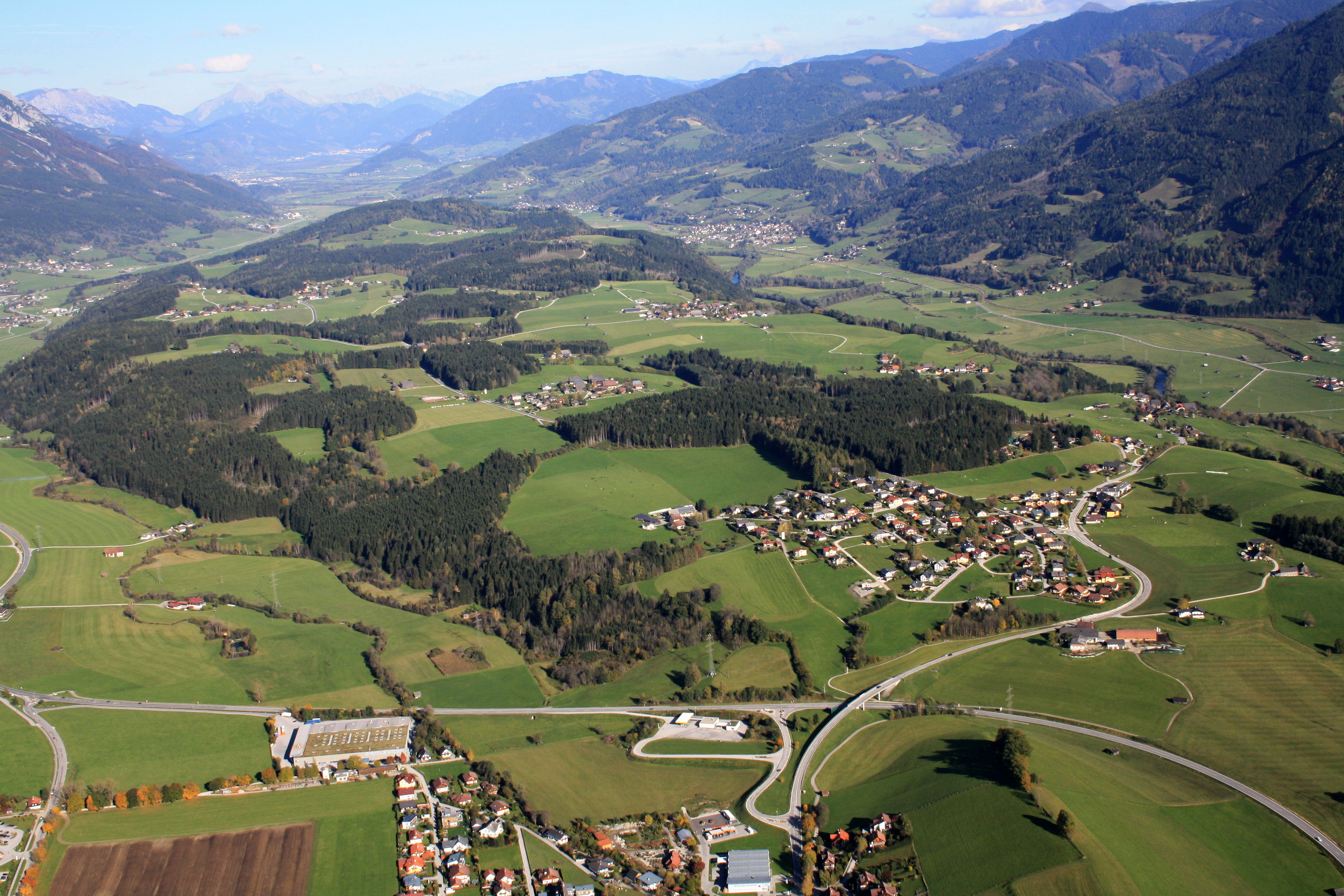
- Aerial view of Mitterberg

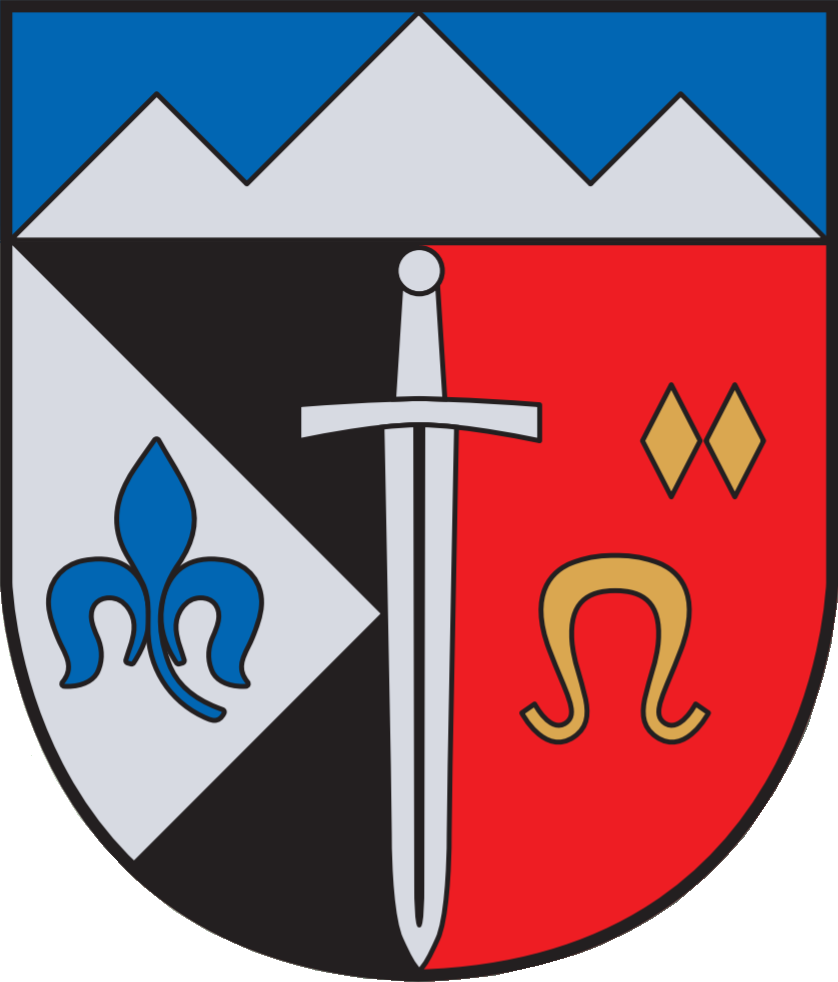
- Coat of arms

- Location within Austria
- Coordinates: 47°29′20″N 13°58′55″E
- Country: Austria
- State: Styria
- District: Leizing

Government
  - Mayor: Friedrich Zefferer (SPÖ)

Area
  - Total: 54.94 km^{2} (21.21 sq mi)

Population (2018-01-01)
  - Total: 1,933
  - Density: 35.18/km^{2} (91.13/sq mi)
- Time zone: UTC+1 (CET)
  - Summer (DST): UTC+2 (CEST)
- Postal code: 8954, 8962
- Area code: 03684, 03685
- Website: www.mitterberg- sanktmartin.at/

Mitterberg-Sankt Martin is a municipality since 2015 in the Expositur Gröbming in the Liezen District of Styria, Austria (judicial district Schladming).

The municipality was founded as part of the Styria municipal structural reform, at the end of 2014, by merging the former towns Mitterberg and Sankt Martin am Grimming.

== Geography ==
=== Municipality arrangement ===
The municipality territory includes the following sections (populations 2015):

- Diemlern (124)
- Gersdorf (371)
- Mitterberg (639)
- Oberlengdorf (137)
- Salza (143)
- Sankt Martin am Grimming (229)
- Strimitzen (47)
- Tipschern (154)
- Unterlengdorf (90)

The municipality consists of the Katastralgemeinden (areas 2015):

- Diemlern (919,75 ha)
- Lengdorf (1.463,09 ha)
- Mitterberg (1.728,63 ha)
- St. Martin (1.380,85 ha)

== Coat of arms ==
Crests of former towns

St. Martin am Grimming

Both predecessors had a community crest. Because of the merger, both crests lost their official validity on January 1, 2015. The authorization of the municipal coat of arms for the merged community took effect on 15 February 2015.

Blazon (crest description):

"Under a blue shield head with a silver tri-peak, the middle point of which is higher, divided from black to red, on the right side is a golden horseshoe with 2 rhombuses, at left is a silver diamond-square with a blue lily inside; the center is split with a downward silver sword".

== Economy ==
=== Tourism ===
The municipality formed, together with Michaelerberg-Pruggern and Gröbming, the tourism agency "Gröbminger Land“. The base is in the town Gröbming.
