= Ignaz Sigismund Poetsch =

Austrian physician and lichenologist

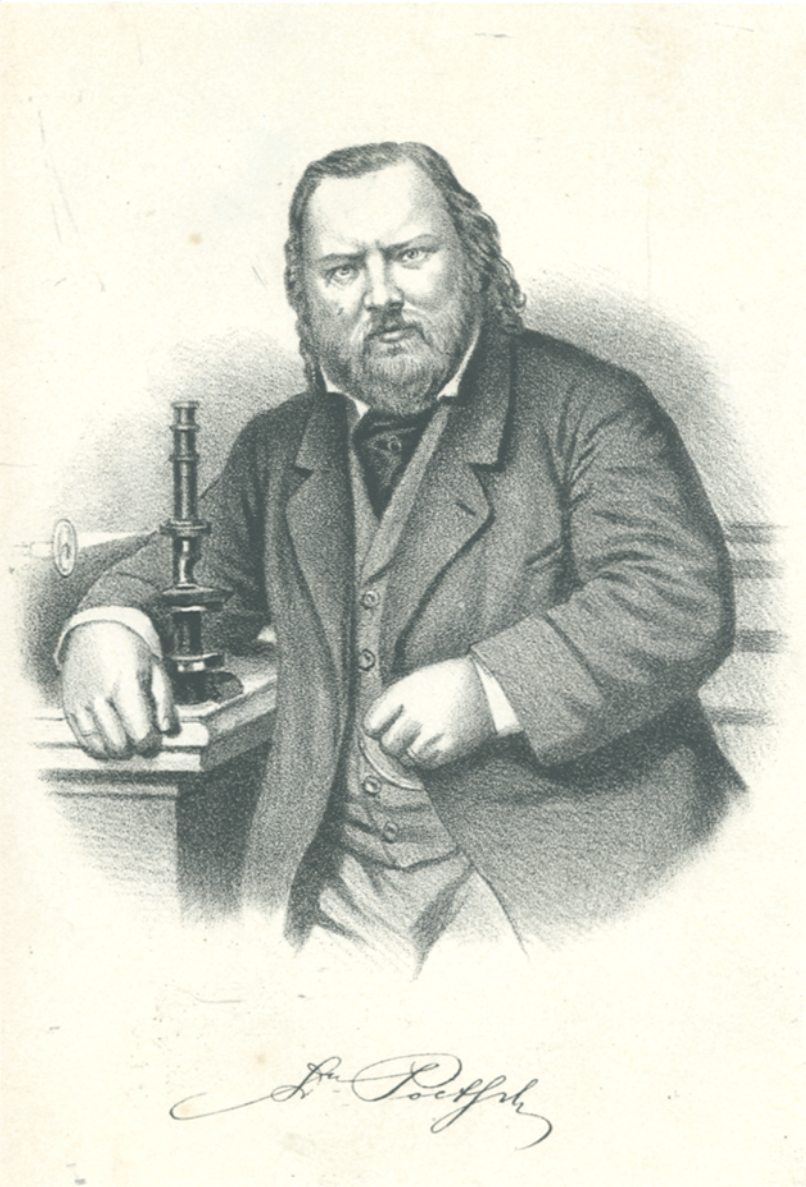
- 1881 lithograph of Poetsch
- Born: October 20, 1823; Drmaly, Vysoká Pec, Bohemia
- Died: April 23, 1884 (aged 60); Mitterberg, Austria-Hungary
- Education: University of Prague; University of Vienna
- Scientific career
- Fields: Medicine; cryptogamic botany; mycology; lichenology
- Workplaces: Kremsmünster Abbey; Industrial works at Gaming; Vienna hospitals
- Author abbrev. (botany): Poetsch

Ignaz Sigismund Poetsch (20 October 1823 – 23 April 1884) was a Bohemian-born medical doctor and lichenologist in the Austrian Empire and later Austria-Hungary. Trained as a medical doctor in Prague and Vienna, he worked as a hospital physician in Vienna before spending most of his career as works doctor in Gaming and monastery physician in Kremsmünster, both in present-day Austria. Alongside his medical duties he developed an extensive expertise in cryptogamic botany, especially mosses and lichens, and became one of the main recorders of the lichen funga of Lower Austria, Upper Austria, and Styria in the mid-nineteenth century. His herbarium comprised about 12,000 cryptogamic specimens and he contributed material and identifications to several major European exsiccata series. The genus Poetschia and a number of fungal and lichen species have been named in his honour.

== Life ==
Poetsch was born in 1823 in Turmaul, now Drmaly (part of Vysoká Pec in the Czech Republic), near the town of Jirkov at the foot of the Ore Mountains. He came from a poor family and attended elementary school in Rothenhaus from 1830 to 1834, the secondary school in Komotau (now Chomutov) from 1835 to 1836, and the monastic grammar school (Stiftsgymnasium) in Ossegg (today Osek) from 1836 to 1841. He then studied philosophy and the first two years of medicine at Charles University before moving to Vienna in 1845, where he completed his medical studies and graduated as Doctor of Medicine on 4 December 1849.

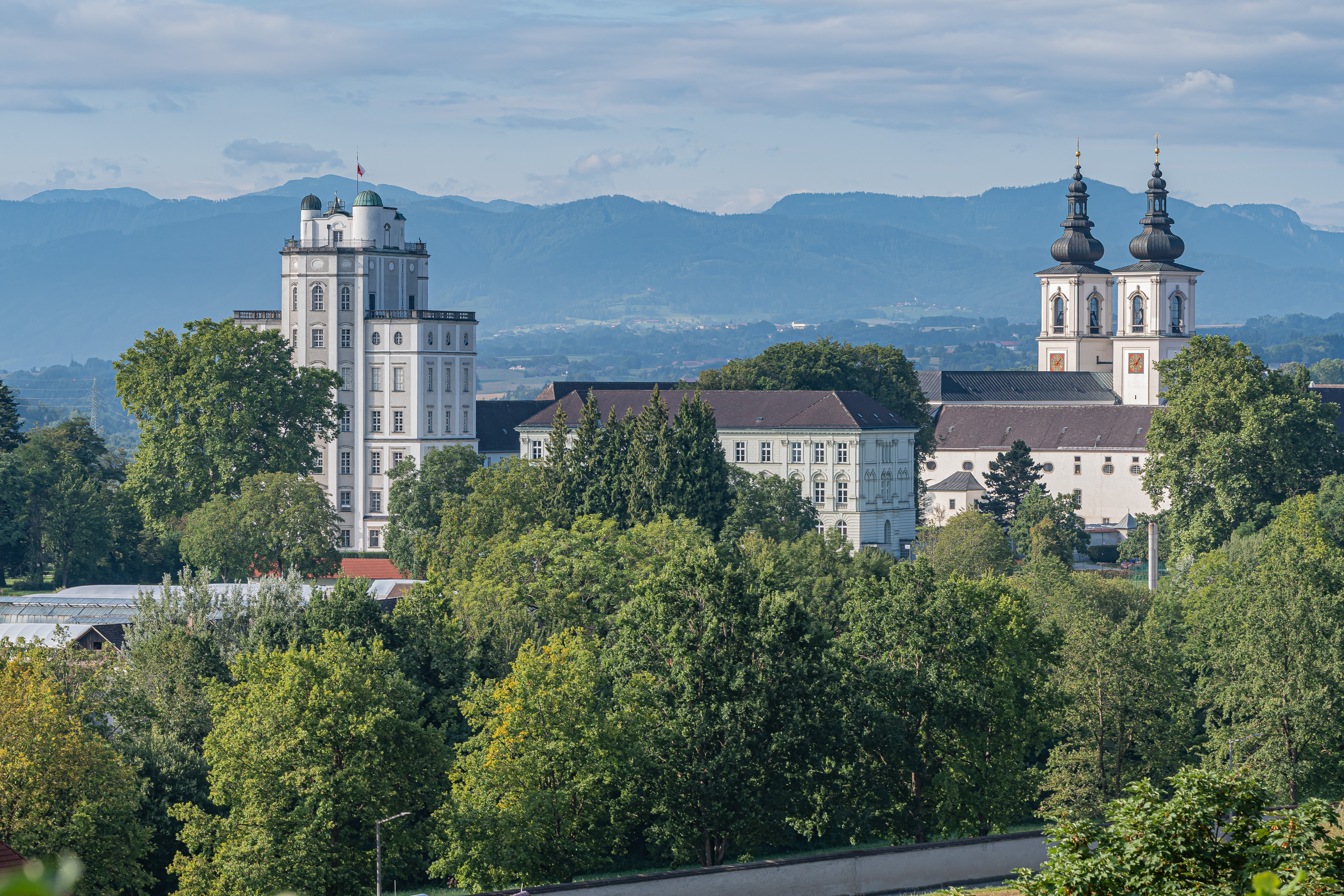
Kremsmünster Abbey, where Poetsch served as monastery physician from 1854 to 1875

After qualifying he worked as a hospital doctor in Vienna, first as a substitute then as full Secundararzt (assistant physician) at the Imperial and Royal Foundling Hospital and at the General Hospital, positions he held until March 1852. He then became works physician at an industrial plant in Gaming in Lower Austria, and in November 1854 he was appointed physician to the Benedictine monastery and its boarding school in Kremsmünster, Upper Austria. In 1875, while visiting Randegg near Gaming, where his wife had inherited property, he suffered a serious heart ailment that forced him to give up his post in Kremsmünster and apply for early retirement. From then on he lived in Randegg, where he died on 23 April 1884 at nearby Mitterberg. A biographical account associated with the Upper Austrian Landesmuseum gives his death as 24 April 1884 and stresses that his retirement to Randegg followed a serious heart condition diagnosed earlier that year. During his student years in Prague, Poetsch became close to the philosopher Augustin Smetana and, through him, to Franz Serafin Exner; according to Wurzbach, these contacts and Poetsch's intensive, annotated reading of Bernard Bolzano's treatise Athanasia played an important part in shaping his intellectual outlook.

== Botanical work ==
Poetsch developed an interest in natural history as a pupil, initially collecting beetles and butterflies and later turning to flowering plants. The Österreichisches Biographisches Lexikon 1815–1950 later described him as one of the foremost investigators of the Austrian cryptogamic flora, especially the mosses and lichens of Upper and Lower Austria. Pressed for time by his medical practice, he eventually abandoned work on phanerogams (seed plants) and devoted himself to mosses and lichens, which could be prepared more slowly and studied in detail. Using Gottlob Ludwig Rabenhorst's Kryptogamenflora von Deutschland as his main reference, he began to survey the cryptogamic flora around Gaming, Kremsmünster and other parts of Lower and Upper Austria. In Kremsmünster he formed a close partnership with the physician Karl Schiedermayr in nearby Kirchdorf an der Krems; together they undertook a systematic investigation of the cryptogamic flora of Upper Austria. Wurzbach notes that Poetsch's early "Beiträge" on mosses and lichens added six liverworts, three mosses and forty-five lichens to the published flora of Lower Austria, and that his Upper Austrian papers increased the recorded cryptogamic flora there by a further 86 mosses and 26 lichens.

From the mid-1850s, Poetsch contributed a series of papers to the society's memoir and proceedings journals, the Abhandlungen der Kaiserlich-Königlichen Zoologisch-Botanischen Gesellschaft in Wien (memoirs) and Verhandlungen der Kaiserlich-Königlichen Zoologisch-Botanischen Gesellschaft in Wien (proceedings). These included contributions on the mosses of Lower Austria, the lichens and liverworts of Randegg and Kremsmünster; successive additions to the cryptogamic flora of Upper Austria added many previously unrecorded species of mosses and lichens for the region. A later review of lichen research in Upper Austria singles out the meeting of Poetsch and Schiedermayr at Kremsmünster in 1856 as the turning point that led to the first and so far only comprehensive cryptogamic flora of the province, with Poetsch responsible for lichens, mosses and ferns and Schiedermayr for algae and fungi. He also published notes on lichens from Styria and from the upper Styrian Alps, and in 1864 a paper on the cryptogamic flora of the lower Bavarian Forest in the journal Flora (then published in Regensburg). For an 1859 travel guide to the Ötscher region he prepared an account of the local cryptogamic flora, drawing on his own records and those of visiting botanists.

In collaboration with Schiedermayr, Poetsch compiled the Systematische Aufzählung der im Erzherzogthume Oesterreich ob der Enns bisher beobachteten samenlosen Pflanzen (Kryptogamen), which enumerated 2,846 records of algae, fungi, lichens, mosses and ferns known from Upper Austria and was published as a separate supplement by the Zoologisch-Botanische Gesellschaft in 1872. He described new taxa of fungi and lichens, including the rust fungus Puccinia maydis, the crustose lichen Sagedia lojkana, and several other species that were later placed in synonymy by subsequent authors.

Poetsch was a prolific collector and widely consulted specialist in lichen identification. He contributed specimens to numerous exsiccata and herbarium series edited by Rabenhorst, including Bryotheca Europaea, Lichenes Europaei, Fungi Europaei, Cladoniae Europaeae, Cryptogamae vasculares Europaeae, Hepaticae Europaeae and Algae Europaeae, as well as to Theodor Bail's Pilztypenherbar and to the Lichenes selecti Germaniae and Parerga lichenologica of Gustav Wilhelm Körber. At the 1873 Vienna World's Fair his Cladoniae Austriacae collection was awarded the Fortschrittsmedaille – the exposition's official "progress" medal, awarded to exhibits judged by the international jury to represent significant scientific or industrial merit.

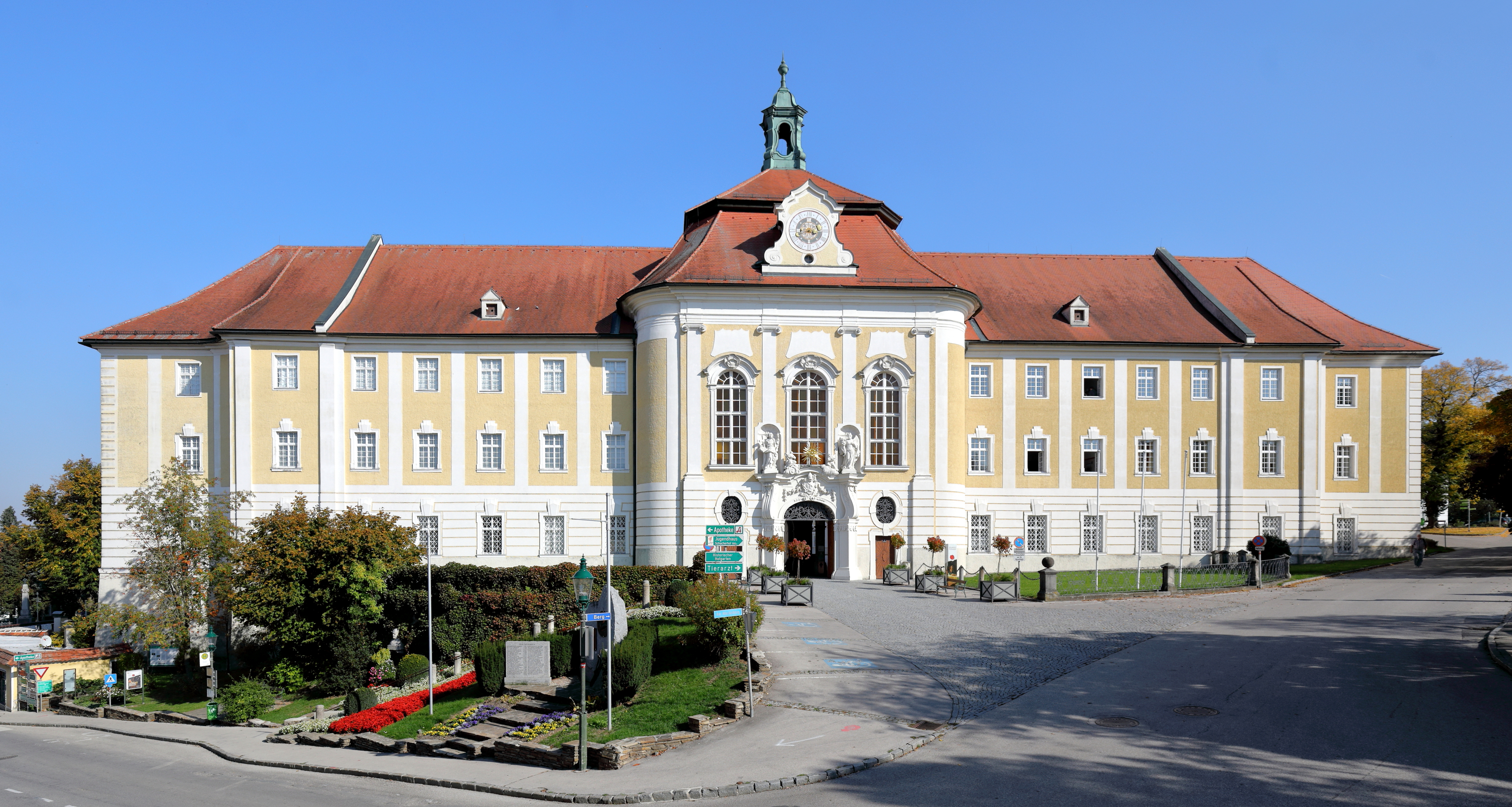
Seitenstetten Abbey, which preserves Poetsch's herbarium of approximately 12,000 cryptogamic specimens

For many years he determined lichen material sent to him from Hungary, Tyrol, Bohemia and Moravia, and his herbarium of around 12,000 cryptogamic specimens was acquired by the Benedictine abbey of Seitenstetten, with further material, especially from Upper Austria, preserved in the herbarium of Ferdinand Arnold in Munich and in the museums at Kremsmünster and Linz. A modern survey of collections in Upper Austria notes that Poetsch rarely travelled beyond Upper and Lower Austria, apart from a holiday in Styria in 1857 and a visit to Gustav Körber in Breslau in 1863, and confirms that his herbarium of roughly 12,000 specimens at Seitenstetten is still preserved there; it also records that a small box of lichen material from his estate was donated to the Natural History Museum, Vienna by his granddaughter in 1977. The collector index in Index Herbariorum lists Poetsch's main herbarium under the Benedictine gymnasium at Seitenstetten and shows that his bryophyte, lichen and fungus collections are now represented in several major Central European herbaria, including Helsinki (H), Leiden (L), Munich (M), the Naturhistorisches Museum in Vienna (W), the university herbarium in Vienna (WU) and Wrocław (WRSL) in Poland, as well as in sets of his exsiccata series Cladoniae austriacae.

Poetsch was active in several learned societies. In 1863 he received a diploma as corresponding member of the Museum Francisco Carolinum in Linz in recognition of his work on its moss and lichen collections. He was also a member of the Zoologisch-Botanische Gesellschaft in Vienna, a corresponding member of the Regensburg Botanical Society, and an honorary member of the Natural History Society in Passau. A more extensive contemporary biography of Poetsch was published by Constantin von Wurzbach in his Biographisches Lexikon des Kaiserthums Oesterreich. Wurzbach also records that Poetsch belonged to the Imperial and Royal Agricultural Society in Upper Austria, in addition to his botanical memberships, and that as a medical student he privately printed a playful occasional poem, "Der Secirsaal. Nachahmender Gedicht nach Schiller's 'Lied von der Glocke'" ('The dissecting room: an imitative poem modelled on Schiller's 'Song of the Bell''), written for the name day of the anatomist Josef Hyrtl.

== Legacy ==
Körber honoured Poetsch's work on lichens by naming the fungal genus Poetschia and several species after him, among them Biatora poetschiana. Additional eponymous taxa include Agaricus poetschii, Anthostomella poetschii, Buelliella poetschii and Daedalea poetschii. Körber also cited many of Poetsch's records from Lower Austria, Upper Austria and Styria in his Parerga lichenologica, reflecting the importance of Poetsch's collections for the knowledge of the Austrian lichen flora in the nineteenth century.

== Selected works ==
- Poetsch, Ignaz Sigismund (1856). "Beitrag zur Mooskunde Niederösterreichs" [Contribution to the study of the mosses of Lower Austria] (PDF). Abhandlungen des Zoologisch-Botanischen Vereins in Wien (in German). 4: 355–362.
- Poetsch, Ignaz Sigismund (1863). "Lichenes Welwitschiani. Aufzählung mehrerer von Dr. F. Welwitsch in Oesterreich gesammelten Flechten" [Lichens collected by Welwitsch: an enumeration of lichens collected in Austria by Dr F. Welwitsch] (PDF). Verhandlungen der Kaiserlich-Königlichen Zoologisch-Botanischen Gesellschaft in Wien (in German). 13: 581–584.
- Poetsch, Ignaz Sigismund (1864). "Beitrag zur Kryptogamenflora des unteren Bayerwaldes" [Contribution to the cryptogamic flora of the lower Bavarian Forest]. Flora (in German). 47: 88–94.
- Poetsch, Ignaz Sigismund; Schiedermayr, Karl B. (1872). Systematische Aufzählung der im Erzherzogthume Oesterreich ob der Enns bisher beobachteten samenlosen Pflanzen (Kryptogamen) [Systematic enumeration of the seedless plants (cryptogams) so far recorded from Upper Austria] (in German). Wien: W. Braumüller. pp. 1–384.
- Poetsch, Ignaz Sigismund (1879). "Neue österreichische Pilze" [New Austrian fungi]. Österreichische Botanische Zeitschrift (in German). 29: 289–291.
