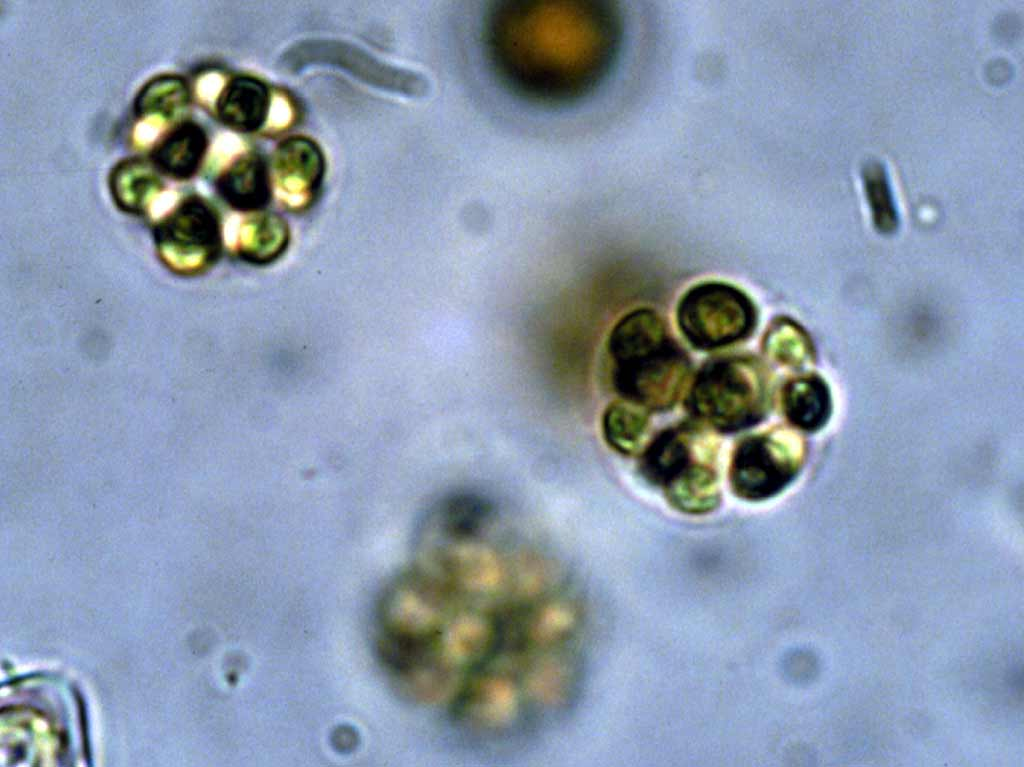
- Sphaerocystis schroeteri

Scientific classification
- Kingdom: Plantae
- Division: Chlorophyta
- Class: Chlorophyceae
- Order: Chlamydomonadales
- Family: Sphaerocystidaceae; Fott ex P.M.Tsarenko

Genera
- See text.

= Sphaerocystidaceae =

Family of algae

Sphaerocystidaceae is a family of chlorophyte green algae, in the order Chlamydomonadales.

== Genera ==
As of February 2022, AlgaeBase accepted the following genera:

- Dictyochlorella P.C.Silva – 3 species
- Heleochloris Korshikov – 3 species
- Korschpalmella Fott – 2 species
- Planctococcus Korshikov – 1 species
- Planochloris Komárek – 1 species
- Sphaerocystis Chodat – 4 species
- Topaczevskiella Massjuk – 1 species
