= Planochloris =

Scientific classification
- Clade: Viridiplantae
- Division: Chlorophyta
- Class: Chlorophyceae
- Order: Chlamydomonadales
- Family: Sphaerocystidaceae
- Genus: Planochloris; Komárek, 1979
- Species: P. pyrenoidifera

Binomial name
- Planochloris pyrenoidifera (Korshikov) Komárek

Genus of algae

Planochloris is a genus of green algae, in the family Sphaerocystidaceae. Its sole species is Planochloris pyrenoidifera.
