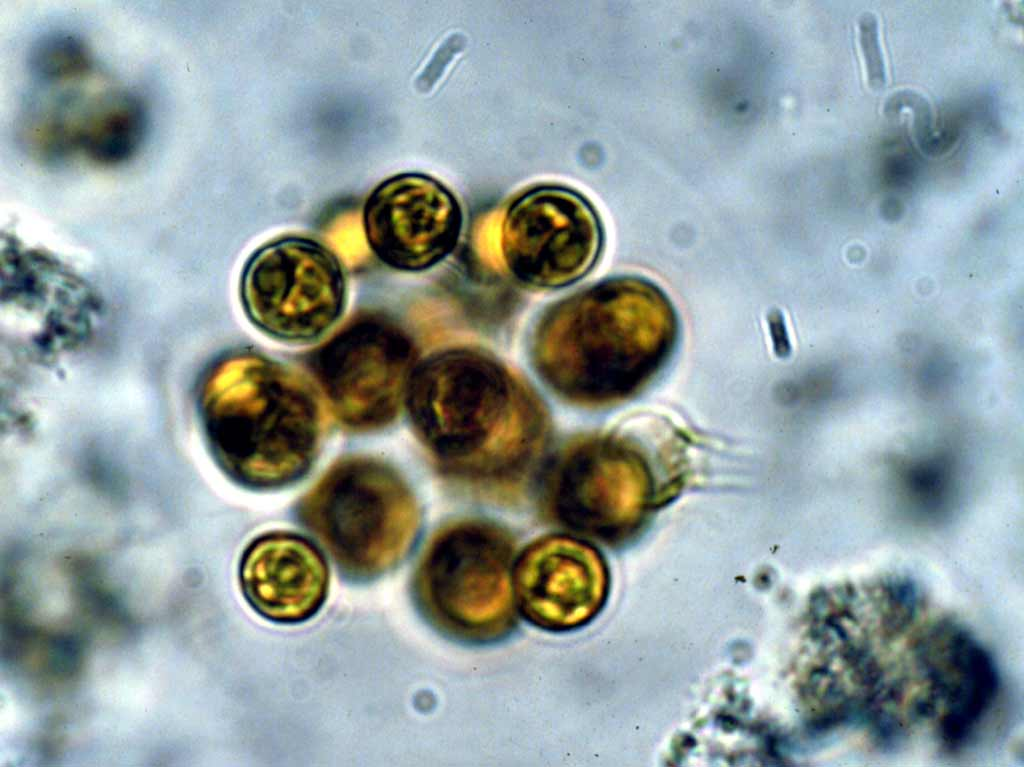

Scientific classification
- Kingdom: Plantae
- Division: Chlorophyta
- Class: Chlorophyceae
- Order: Sphaeropleales
- Family: Radiococcaceae
- Genus: Gloeocystis; Nägeli

Type species
- Gloeocystis vesiculosa Nägeli

Species
- Gloeocystis adnata; Gloeocystis banneerghattensis; Gloeocystis gigas; Gloeocystis vesiculosa

= Gloeocystis =

Genus of algae

Gloeocystis is a genus of green algae in the family Radiococcaceae. Members of this genus are widely distributed and found in the plankton of freshwaters, in soil or mosses, or on rocks or wood.

Gloeocystis consists of colonies of cells embedded in an irregular mucilaginous envelope. The mucilaginous material is typically lamellate, i.e. forms concentric layers around cells or groups of cells. Cells are spherical to ovoid, with smooth cell walls. Cells have a single nucleus and one parietal chloroplast with a single pyrenoid.

Asexual reproduction occurs via the formation of autospores; two to eight (sometimes 16) are formed per cell. Daughter cells are released when the mother cell wall gelatinizes. One species, G. banneerghattensis, also produces brown, thick-walled akinetes.

== Taxonomy ==
Species in Gloeocystis are distinguished based on cell size, shape, arrangement, and colony morphology. The similar genus Chlamydocapsa reproduces via zoospores instead of autospores. The generic limits of Gloeocystis and similar genera such as Coenocystis need revision.
