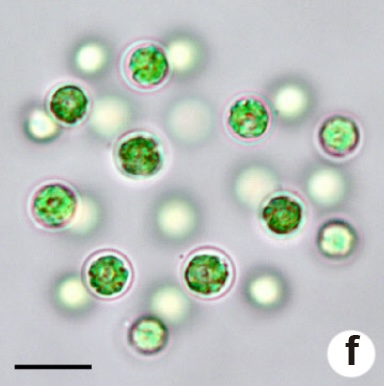
- Eutetramorus tetrasporus

Scientific classification
- Kingdom: Plantae
- Division: Chlorophyta
- Class: Chlorophyceae
- Order: Sphaeropleales
- Family: Radiococcaceae
- Genus: Eutetramorus; Walton, 1918

Type species
- Eutetramorus globosus Walton

Species
- See text

= Eutetramorus =

Genus of algae

Eutetramorus is a genus of algae belonging to the family Radiococcaceae. It is planktonic in freshwater habitats; it has been reported from Europe and North America.

Eutetramorus consists of microscopic colonies of cells embedded in a structureless mucilage. The cells are spherical, with cells often in sub-groups of four or eight. Each cell contains a single nucleus and one parietal chloroplast with one or more pyrenoids. Asexual reproduction occurs via the formation of four or eight (occasionally 16) spherical to ovoid autospores; they are released when the mother cell wall gelatinizes. Sexual reproduction and flagellated life stages have not been observed.

== Taxonomy ==
Eutetramorus is sometimes considered to be synonymous with Coenococcus, with the name Eutetramorus having priority. Some authorities accept Coenococcus over Eutetramorus, arguing that the "name of genus Eutetramorus must be rejected according to the International Code of Botanical Nomenclature, because it is the source of errors because of incomplete diagnosis".

Species:

- Eutetramorus fottii (Hindák) Komárek
- Eutetramorus globosus Walton
- Eutetramorus granuliferus (F.Hindák) I.Kostikov, T.Darienko, A.Lukesová, & L.Hoffmann
- Eutetramorus mollenhaueri (F.Hindák) I.Kostikov, T.Darienko, A.Lukesová, & L.Hoffmann
- Eutetramorus nygaardii Komárek
- Eutetramorus planctonicus (Korshikov) Bourrelly
- Eutetramorus polycoccus (Korshikov) Komárek
- Eutetramorus tapasteanus (J.Komárek) I.Kostikov, T.Darienko, A.Lukesová, & L.Hoffmann
- Eutetramorus tetrasporus Komárek
