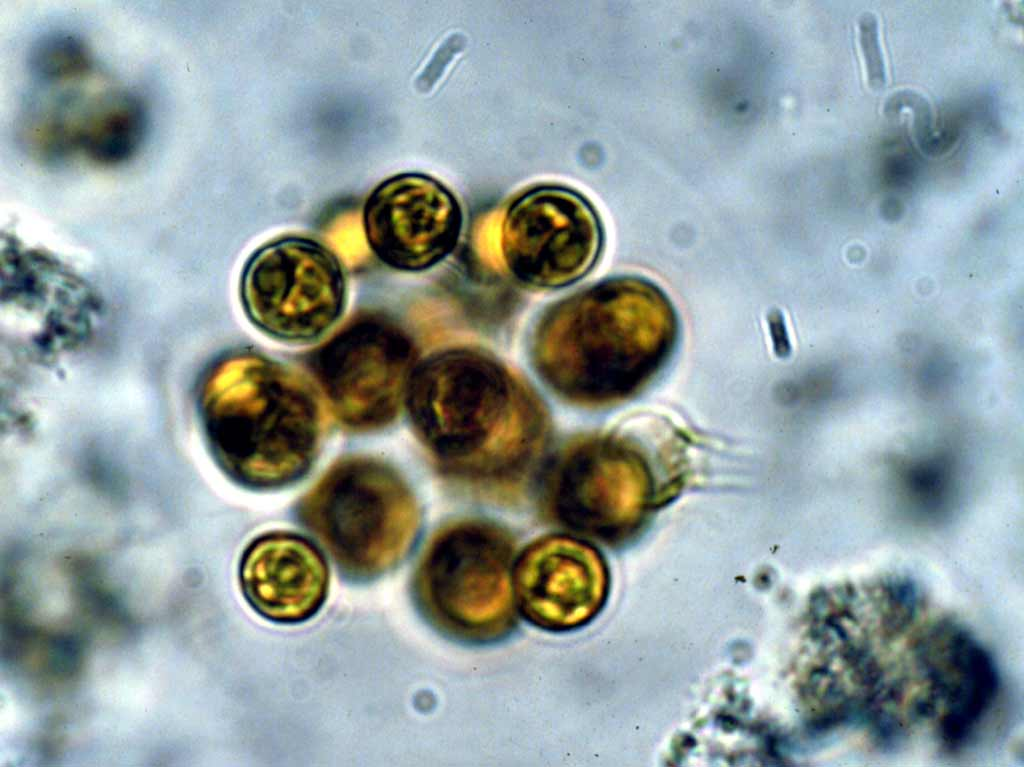
- Gloeocystis sp.

Scientific classification
- Kingdom: Plantae
- Division: Chlorophyta
- Class: Chlorophyceae
- Order: Sphaeropleales
- Family: Radiococcaceae; Fott ex P.C. Silva

Genera
- See text.

= Radiococcaceae =

Family of algae

Radiococcaceae is a family of microscopic green algae in the order Sphaeropleales. Members of this family are widespread in terrestrial and freshwater habitats.

The family Radiococcaceae consists of colonies of cells embedded in a mucilage, generally arranged without a fixed pattern. Cells are spherical, oblong, oval, ellipsoidal or elongated, with a smooth cell wall. Cells contain parietal chloroplasts with or without pyrenoids. Cells reproduce by producing autospores, never by zoospores or hemizoospores.

Algae in the Radiococcaceae are among the most taxonomically difficult groups of green algae. Diagnostic characters used to delimit species and genera include cell size and shape, type of chloroplast and number of pyrenoids, number of autospores produced, structure of colonial mucilage, and persistence (or lack thereof) of the sporangial cell wall. However, taxonomists have emphasized different characters over others, leading to species being transferred between multiple genera. In 2002, Kostikov et al. proposed a coherent, if artificial generic classification. As currently circumscribed, Radiococcaceae is polyphyletic.

== Genera ==
As of April 2026, AlgaeBase accepted the following genera:

- Catenococcus F.Hindák
- Chlororustica Shin Watanbe, N.Mezaki & Tatsuya Suzuki
- Coenobotrys I.Kostikov, T.Darienko, A.Lukesová, & L.Hoffmann
- Coenochloris Korshikov
- Coenococcus Korshikov
- Coenocystis Korshikov
- Coenodispora I.Kostikov, T.Darienko, A.Lukesová, & L.Hoffmann
- Crucigloea C.J.Soeder
- Diplosphaeropsis I.Kostikov, T.Darienko, A.Lukesová, & L.Hoffmann
- Eutetramorus Walton
- Garhundacystis I.Kostikov & L.Hoffmann
- Gloeocystis Nägeli
- Herndonia Shin Watanabe
- Hindakochloris A.Comas
- Korshikoviobispora I.Kostikov, T.Darienko, A.Lukesová, & L.Hoffmann
- Neocystis F.Hindák
- Palmellosphaerium M.O.P.Iyengar
- Palmococcus I.Kostikov, T.Darienko, A.Lukesová, & L.Hoffmann
- Palmodictyon Kützing
- Pharao A.A.Saber, Fucíková, H.McManus, Guella & Cantonati
- Radiococcus Schmidle
- Schizochloris Kostikov, Darienko, Lukesová & L.Hoffmann
- Sphaerochlamydella Kostikov, Darienko, Lukesová & L.Hoffmann
- Sphaerochloris Hindák
- Sphaerococcomyxa I.Kostikov, T.Darienko, A.Lukesová, & L.Hoffmann
- Sphaeroneocystis I.Kostikov, T.Darienko, A.Lukesová, & L.Hoffmann
- Sporotetras Butcher
- Thorakochloris Pascher
- Tomaculum Whitford
