= Follicularia =

Scientific classification
- Clade: Viridiplantae
- Division: Chlorophyta
- Class: Chlorophyceae
- Order: Sphaeropleales
- Family: Schizochlamydaceae
- Genus: Follicularia; V.V.Miller, 1924

Type species
- Follicularia paradoxalis V.V.Miller

Species
- Follicularia botryoides; Follicularia ettlii; Follicularia komarekii; Follicularia paradoxalis; Follicularia texensis

Genus of algae

Follicularia is a genus of green algae, in the family Schizochlamydaceae. It is found in terrestrial habitats, mainly soil.

Follicularia consists of single cells or groups of cells. Cells are spherical, with a smooth cell wall. Young cells contain a single parietal chloroplast with a pyrenoid; later, adult cells contain many conical to prismatic chloroplasts lining the insides of the cell membrane. Asexual reproduction occurs via zoospores with two flagella, or aplanospores.

The genus Follicularia is morphologically similar to Planktosphaeria, a genus that is traditionally defined as producing autospores instead of zoospores. Additionally, species matching the morphological description of Follicularia have been found to be of polyphyletic origins; some species have been transferred to the new genus, Herndonia.
