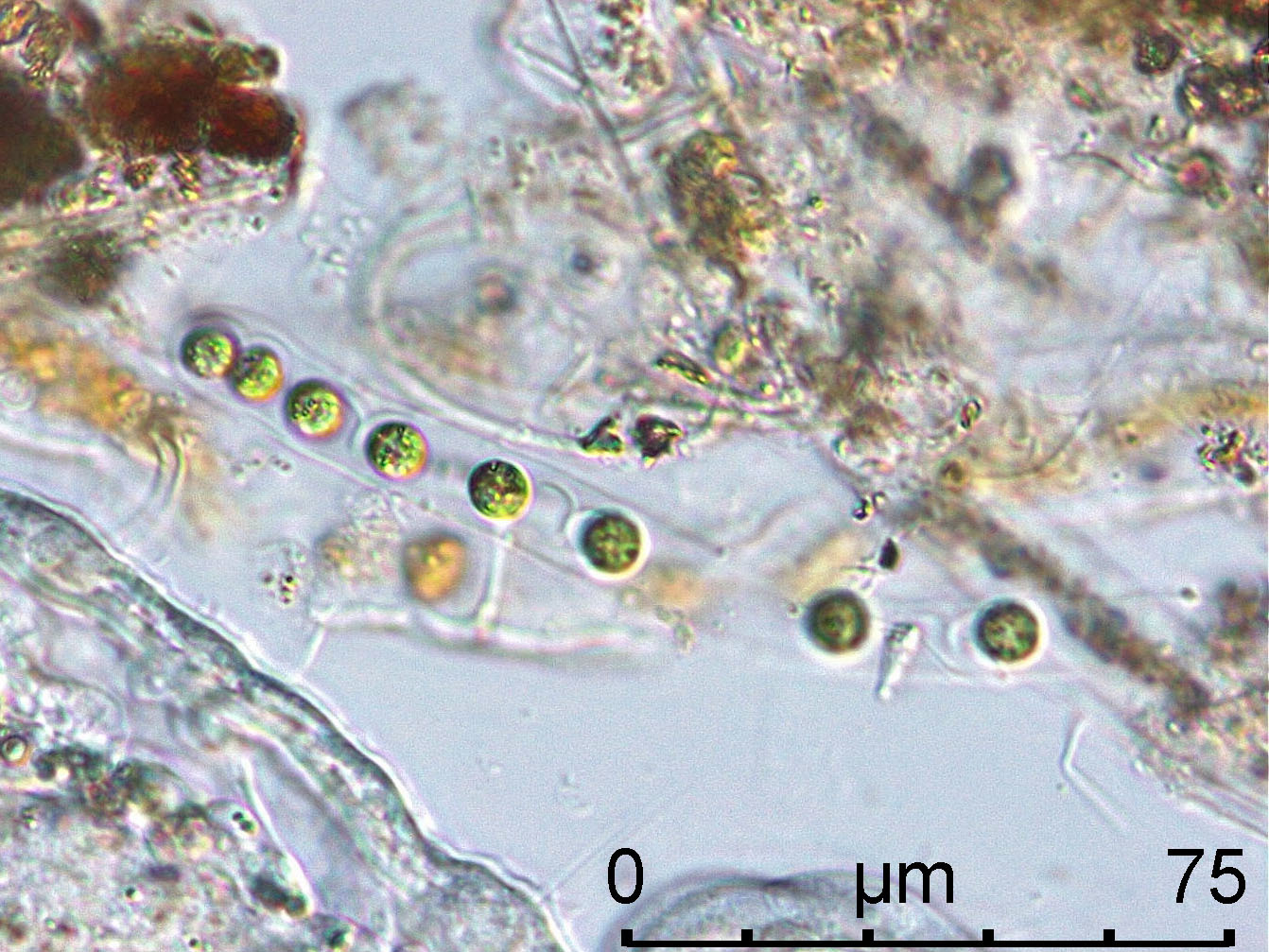

Scientific classification
- Kingdom: Plantae
- Division: Chlorophyta
- Class: Chlorophyceae
- Order: Sphaeropleales
- Family: Radiococcaceae
- Genus: Palmodictyon; Kützing, 1845

Type species
- Palmodictyon varium

Species
- Palmodictyon resendeanum; Palmodictyon varium; Palmodictyon viride

Synonyms
- Palmodactylon Nägeli, 1949

= Palmodictyon =

Genus of algae

Palmodictyon is a genus of green algae in the family Radiococcaceae. It is found in freshwater habitats worldwide, and is commonly collected but never abundant.

Palmodictyon consists of spherical cells embedded in tube-shaped mucilage. The tubes of mucilage are unstratified, simple or branched or anastomosing, and sometimes red or brown. Within the tubes, cells may be arranged in disorganized rows, or sometimes in pairs or groups of four. Cells are spherical to ovoid with thin, smooth cell walls. Each cell contains one or more chloroplasts with or without pyrenoids. Asexual reproduction occurs via the formation of autospores. Two or four autospores are produced per cell, which are released when the mother cell wall fragments or gelatinizes.
