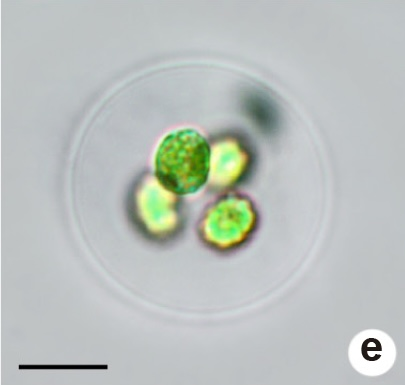
- Coenocystis subcylindrica

Scientific classification
- Kingdom: Plantae
- Division: Chlorophyta
- Class: Chlorophyceae
- Order: Sphaeropleales
- Family: Radiococcaceae
- Genus: Coenocystis; Korshikov

Type species
- Coenocystis planctonica Korshikov

Species
- Coenocystis helvetica; Coenocystis inconstans; Coenocystis planctonica; Coenocystis subcylindrica

= Coenocystis =

Genus of algae

Coenocystis is a genus of green algae in the family Radiococcaceae. It is planktonic in freshwater habitats such as lakes, rivers, and bogs. It has been reported from Europe and the Americas, but probably has a cosmopolitan distribution.

Coenocystis consists of microscopic colonies of cells embedded in a structureless mucilage. Cells are ellipsoid, ovoid, or spindle-shaped, straight or curved with rounded apices. Each cell contains a single cup-shaped chloroplast with a single pyrenoid. Asexual reproduction occurs by the formation of autospores. Four, eight or 16 (rarely two) autospores are produced per cell; they are released via the fragmentation of the mother cell wall.

Coenocystis is similar to genera such as Coenochloris and Sphaerocystis. Coenocystis is distinguished by a combination of features, such as elongated (not spherical) cells, presence of pyrenoids, generally more than four autospores produced per cell, and mother cell walls fragmenting rather than dissolving. However, the delimitation between genera in the family Radiococcaceae is artificial and in need of revision.
