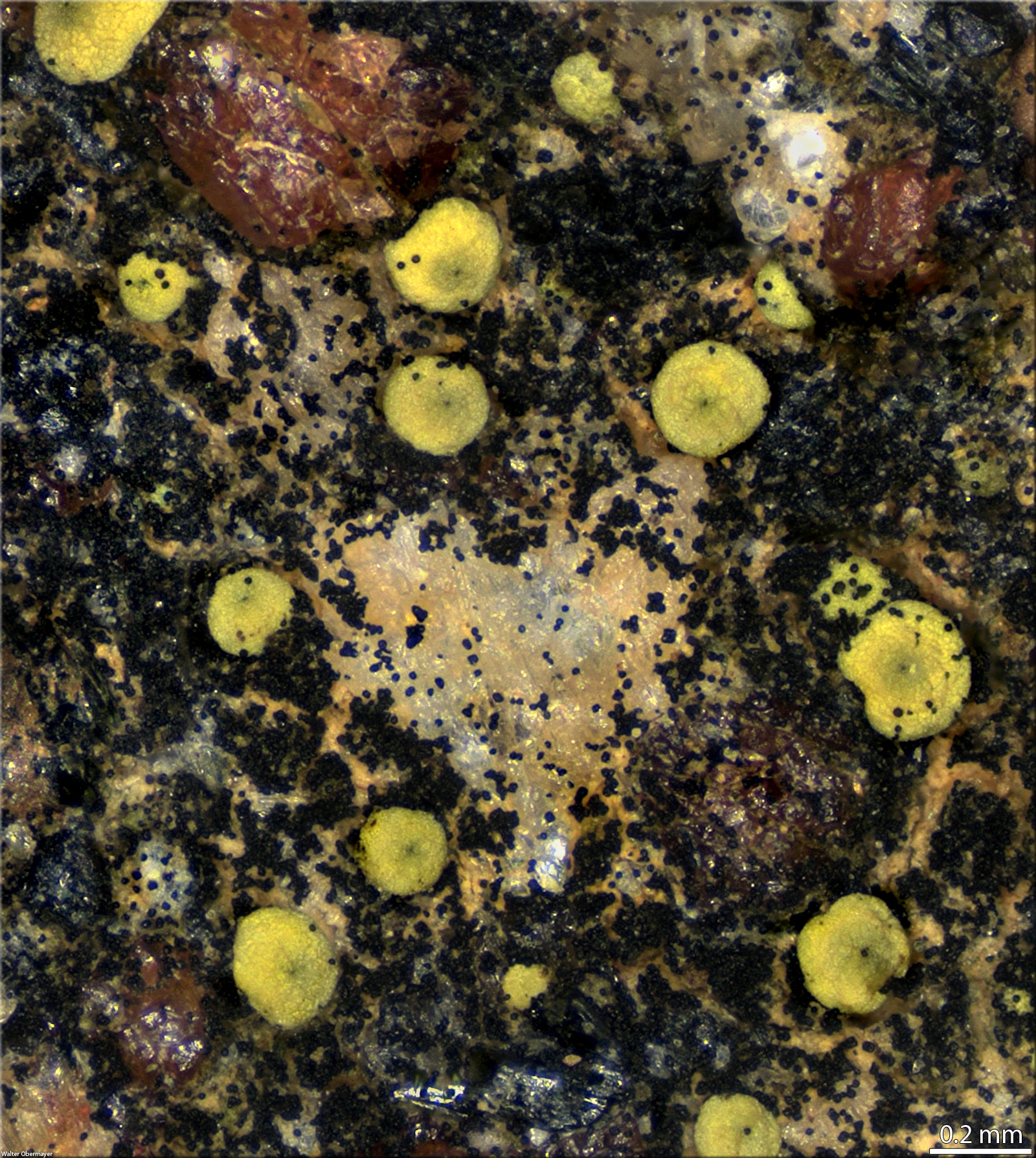
- Thelocarpon laureri

Scientific classification
- Kingdom: Fungi
- Division: Ascomycota
- Order: Thelocarpales
- Family: Thelocarpaceae
- Genus: Thelocarpon; Nyl. (1853)

Type species
- Thelocarpon laureri (Flot.) Nyl. (1854)

Synonyms
- List: Ahlesia Fuckel (1870); Athelium Nyl. (1886); Cyanocephalium Zukal (1893); Kelleria Tomin (1926); Metanectria Sacc. (1878); Mycothelocarpon Cif. & Tomas. (1953); Sphaeropsis Flot. (1847); Thelocarponomyces Cif. & Tomas. (1953); Thelocarpum Clem. (1909); Thelococcum Nyl. (1888); Thelomphale Flot. (1863)

= Thelocarpon =

Genus of lichen-forming fungi

Thelocarpon is a genus of lichen-forming fungi in the family Thelocarpaceae. The genus was established in 1853 by the Finnish lichenologist William Nylander, who distinguished it from related genera by its warted thallus structure, many-spored asci, and the distinctive violet-blue staining reaction of its fruiting body gel when treated with iodine. These tiny lichens form small, wart-like bumps on soil, wood, and plant debris, often covered with a distinctive bright yellow powdery coating. The genus includes about 30 species found worldwide, many of which produce unusually large numbers of ascospores—sometimes over 300 per spore sac.

== Taxonomy ==
The genus was circumscribed in 1853 by the Finnish lichenologist William Nylander. He established the genus to accommodate lichens with a whitish thallus composed of granular, clustered wart-like structures that sit above papillae and are perforated by mostly subtle pores, each containing a single pale, somewhat enlarged apothecium (fruiting body). He characterised the genus by its cylindrical-spindle-shaped, many-spored asci containing 24–80 or more ascospores per ascus, with the spores being pale yellow, ellipsoid, frequently single-celled. Nylander noted the presence of slender, very abundant paraphyses and observed that the genus was related to Endocarpon, commenting that it belonged to the tribe Endocarpeae. He distinguished Thelocarpon from the previously described Sphaeropsis by its different thallus characteristics, proposing the new genus name after noting that the mucilaginous hymenium was stained violet-blue by iodine and potassium iodide.

In a 1966 monograph of the genus, George Salisbury treated Thelocarpon in a relatively narrow sense, accepting 13 species and reviewing several generic names that had at various times been used for segregates now associated with the genus, including Thelococcum, Athelium, and Alinocarpon. He also noted that the genus had long been difficult to classify, having been placed by different authors near the Hypocreaceae, the Acarosporaceae, or in its own family, Thelocarpaceae. Salisbury had earlier divided the genus into sections based on the presence or absence of an algal sheath, but in his 1966 revision he abandoned that arrangement, arguing that it relied too heavily on degree of lichenization rather than natural relationships. He instead organized the species chiefly by the morphology of the paraphyses together with the development of the algal sheath.

== Description ==
Thelocarpon species are minute lichens whose thallus, when present, wraps around the developing fruit-body so that the two form a tiny, wart-like mound. In many species this sheath is so reduced that the ascoma appears to sit naked on the substrate; a few taxa instead develop a thin, scaly crust. The photosynthetic partner, when there is one, is a single-celled green alga, but some species lack algae altogether and rely on absorbed nutrients.

The sexual fruiting bodies occur in two basic forms. Most species produce perithecia: minute, globose or flask-shaped flasks that open through a pore, while others form apothecia that resemble short cylinders or low discs with the spore layer exposed. Either type may sit on the surface or be slightly sunk into it, and the exterior is often dusted with a bright yellow powdery coating (pruina) produced by pulvinic acid pigments. The outer wall (exciple) is pale or colourless and contains no dark melanins. Inside, the hamathecium consists of a mesh of delicate, branching filaments—paraphyses, periphysoids and periphyses—that are embedded in a jelly. This jelly is diagnostic: it stays clear in iodine solution or, at higher iodine strength, turns red and then deep blue after potassium iodide pretreatment, a reaction called hemiamyloidy. The asci are bottle- to tube-shaped, sometimes with a slightly thickened tip (tholus), and each sac bursts to release a crowd of ascospores—anywhere from a dozen to more than 300. The spores are tiny, colourless, mostly one-celled and usually contain a pair of oil droplets.

Asexual reproduction takes place in equally small pycnidia, flask-like structures that share the same wart-like cover as the perithecia. These generate cylindrical or short-ellipsoid conidia that are usually single-celled but may occasionally show up to two cross-walls. Many Thelocarpon species manufacture pulvinic acid derivatives such as vulpinic acid and pulvinic dilactone. When these pigments are secreted to the surface they create the conspicuous yellow pruina, but in some taxa they are locked within the upper exciple instead. The combination of multispored asci, vivid yellow chemistry and the warted habit makes the genus distinctive among crustose lichens found on nutrient-poor soils, wood and decaying plant debris.

== Species ==
As of June 2025, Species Fungorum (in the Catalogue of Life) accept 29 species of Thelocarpon.

- Thelocarpon actonii P.F.Cannon & Coppins (2025)
- Thelocarpon albidum Nyl. (1853)
- Thelocarpon algicola Groenh. (1954)
- Thelocarpon andicola Flakus & Kukwa (2014)
- Thelocarpon citrum (Wallr.) Rossman (1999)
- Thelocarpon coccosporum Lettau (1955)
- Thelocarpon cyaneum Olech & Alstrup (1990)
- Thelocarpon epibolum Nyl. (1866)
- Thelocarpon immersum Fryday (2020)
- Thelocarpon imperceptum (Nyl.) Mig. (1927)
- Thelocarpon impressellum Nyl. (1867)
- Thelocarpon intermediellum Nyl. (1865)
- Thelocarpon laureri (Flot.) Nyl. (1854)
- Thelocarpon lichenicola (Fuckel) Poelt & Hafellner (1975)
- Thelocarpon macchiae Nimis, Poelt & Puntillo (1994)
- Thelocarpon magnussonii G.Salisb. (1953)
- Thelocarpon microsporum van den Boom (2016)
- Thelocarpon nigrum Aptroot & K.H.Moon (2009)
- Thelocarpon olivaceum B.de Lesd. (1914)
- Thelocarpon opertum J.C.David & Coppins (1997)
- Thelocarpon pallidum G.Salisb. (1953)
- Thelocarpon palniense D.D.Awasthi & Kr.P.Singh (1975)
- Thelocarpon robustum Eitner (1901)
- Thelocarpon sandwicense H.Magn. (1955)
- Thelocarpon saxicola (Zahlbr.) H.Magn. (1935)
- Thelocarpon sphaerosporum H.Magn. (1935)
- Thelocarpon strasseri Zahlbr. (1902)
- Thelocarpon subantarcticum Øvstedal (2001)
- Thelocarpon superellum Nyl. (1865)
- Thelocarpon triseptatum Aptroot & M.Cáceres (2016) – Brazil
