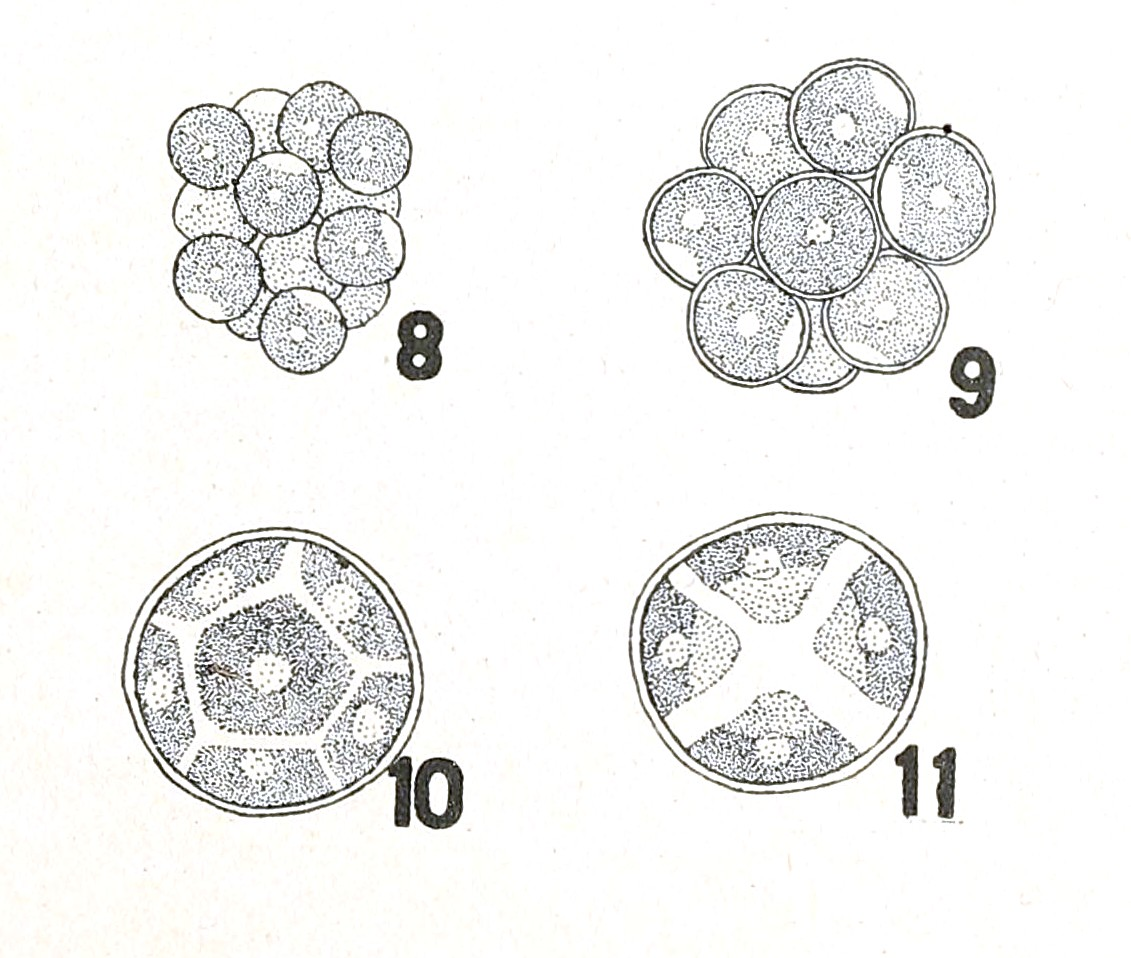
- Planktosphaeria gelatinosa

Scientific classification
- Clade: Viridiplantae
- Division: Chlorophyta
- Class: Chlorophyceae
- Order: Sphaeropleales
- Family: Schizochlamydaceae
- Genus: Planktosphaeria; G.M.Smith

Type species
- Planktosphaeria gelatinosa G.M.Smith

Species
- P. gelatinosa; P. hubeiensis

= Planktosphaeria =

Genus of algae

Planktosphaeria is a genus of Chlorophyceae of the green algae. It was first described by the phycologist Gilbert Morgan Smith in 1918, with Planktosphaeria gelatinosa as its type species. Species of Planktosphaeria are commonly found in freshwater plankton around the world.

== Description ==
Planktosphaeria consists of solitary cells or in clusters of 8 to 16. Cells are spherical, usually surrounded by a layer of mucilage, sometimes with multiple layers. Young cells have a single chloroplast with a pyrenoid. Mature cells have numerous angular chloroplasts that are parietal, with one or several pyrenoids.

Distinguishing Planktosphaeria from other nonmotile coccoid, spherical algae is difficult. Often, Planktosphaeria forms loose ring-like aggregations shortly after vegetative reproduction; when this happens, the mother cell wall may remain, which is a useful identification trait.

== Taxonomy ==
The taxonomy of Planktosphaeria has been muddled in confusion, particularly with regards to the similar genus Follicularia. Follicularia is a genus that produces zoospores, while Planktosphaeria was characterized by reproduction via autospores only. The phycologist Richard C. Starr redefined Planktosphaeria to include Follicularia and subsequently described several species under the name Planktosphaeria; all of these were isolated from soil samples and produced zoospores.

Phylogenetic analysis of the strains isolated by Starr has revealed that zoospore-producing "Planktosphaeria" species were separate from autospore-producing algae, and therefore the name Follicularia has been reapplied to zoospore-producing algal strains. However, zoospore-producing "Planktosphaeria" are also polyphyletic, with the strains falling into two separate clades. Strains from one clade were reclassified in a new genus, named Herndonia. The nature and classification of "true" Planktosphaeria gelatinosa is still uncertain, because no authentic strain of Planktosphaeria gelatinosa matching the genus-level characteristics exists.
