= Coenococcus =

Scientific classification
- Kingdom: Plantae
- Division: Chlorophyta
- Class: Chlorophyceae
- Order: Sphaeropleales
- Family: Radiococcaceae
- Genus: Coenococcus; Korshikov, 1953

Type species
- Coenococcus planctonicus Korshikov, 1953

Genus of algae

Coenococcus is a genus of green algae belonging to the family Radiococcaceae. It occurs as plankton in freshwater habitats.

The species of this genus are found in Europe and Western Asia.

Coenococcus consists of microscopic colonies of cells embedded in a structureless mucilage. Young colonies are spherical or ellipsoid, and of indefinite shape when older. The cells are spherical or broadly ovoid, usually grouped into tetrads or wreath-shaped clusters. Each cell contains a single chloroplast with or without pyrenoids. Asexual reproduction occurs via the formation of four or eight autospores arranged in tetrads, which are released when the mother cell wall gelatinizes or disintegrates.

Coenococcus is sometimes considered to be synonymous with Eutetramorus, with the name Eutetramorus having priority. However, some authorities accept Coenococcus over Eutetramorus, arguing that the "name of genus Eutetramorus must be rejected according to the International Code of Botanical Nomenclature, because it is the source of errors because of incomplete diagnosis".

Species:

- Coenococcus nygaardii (Komárek) Hindák
- Coenococcus planctonicus Korshikov
