= Thelocarpaceae =

Scientific classification
- Kingdom: Fungi
- Division: Ascomycota
- Order: Thelocarpales; Lücking & Lumbsch (2016)
- Family: Thelocarpaceae; Zukal (1893)

Type genus
- Thelocarpon Nyl. (1853)

Genera
- Sarcosagium; Thelocarpon

Family of lichen-forming fungi

Thelocarpaceae is the sole family of lichen-forming fungi in the order Thelocarpales. The family contains two genera, Sarcosagium and Thelocarpon. The family was circumscribed by lichenologist Hugo Zukal in 1893, while the order was proposed by Robert Lücking and H. Thorsten Lumbsch in 2016.

== Genera ==
- Sarcosagium A.Massal. – 1 sp.
- Thelocarpon Nyl. (1853) – 25 spp.
