= Mitterberg =

- Former municipality
- Location within Austria
- Coordinates: 47°27′0″N 13°56′0″E
- Country: Austria
- State: Styria
- District: Liezen

Government
  - Mayor: Friedrich Zefferer (SPÖ)

Area
  - Total: 17.30 km^{2} (6.68 sq mi)
- Elevation: 791 m (2,595 ft)

Population (1 January 2016)
  - Total: 1,157
  - Density: 66.88/km^{2} (173.2/sq mi)
- Time zone: UTC+1 (CET)
  - Summer (DST): UTC+2 (CEST)
- Postal code: 8962
- Area code: 03685
- Vehicle registration: GB
- Website: www.mitterberg.at

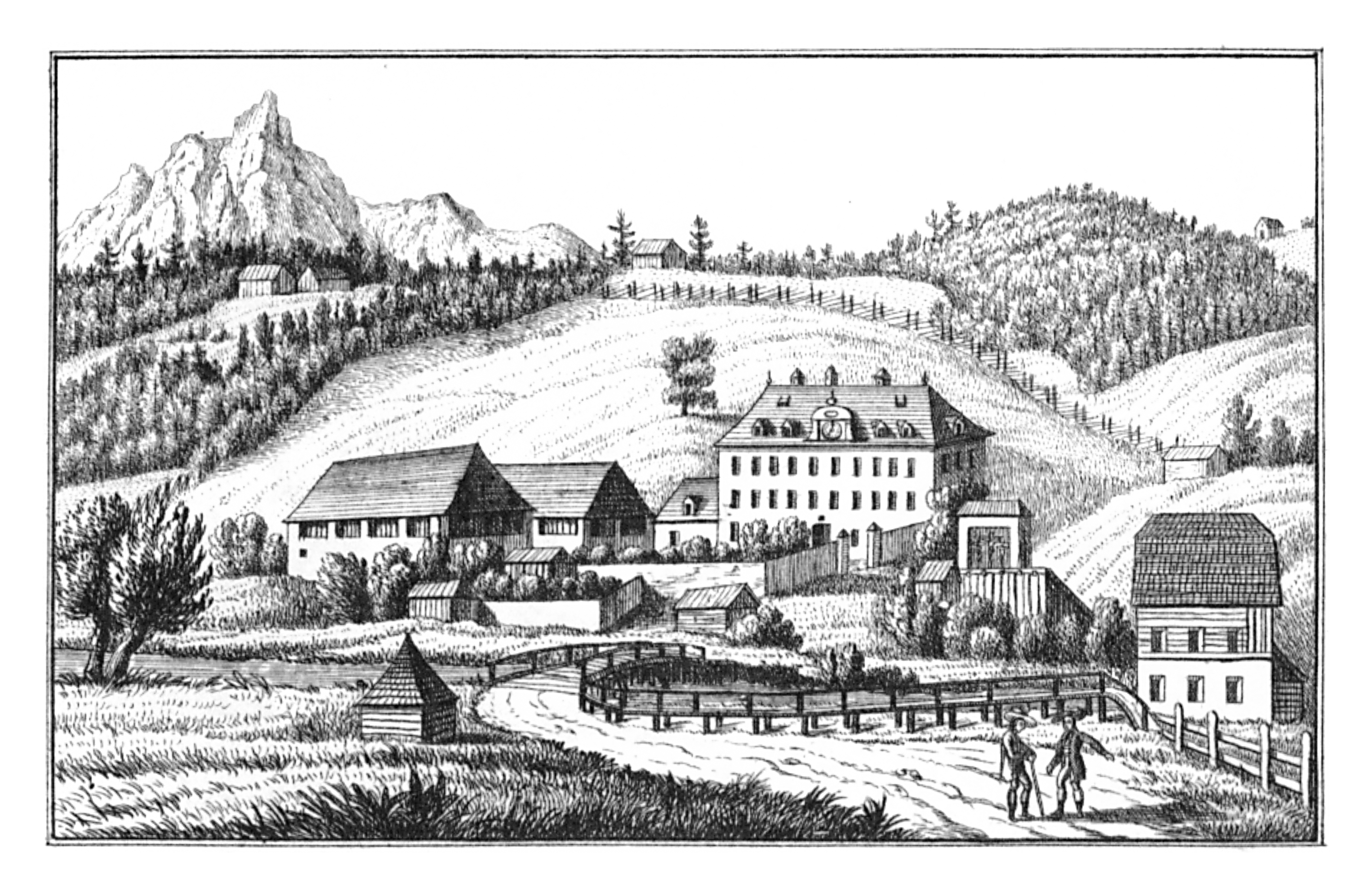
Gstatt castle in Mitterberg, S. Kölbl, Lith. 1830

Mitterberg is a municipality in the district of Liezen in Styria, Austria.
