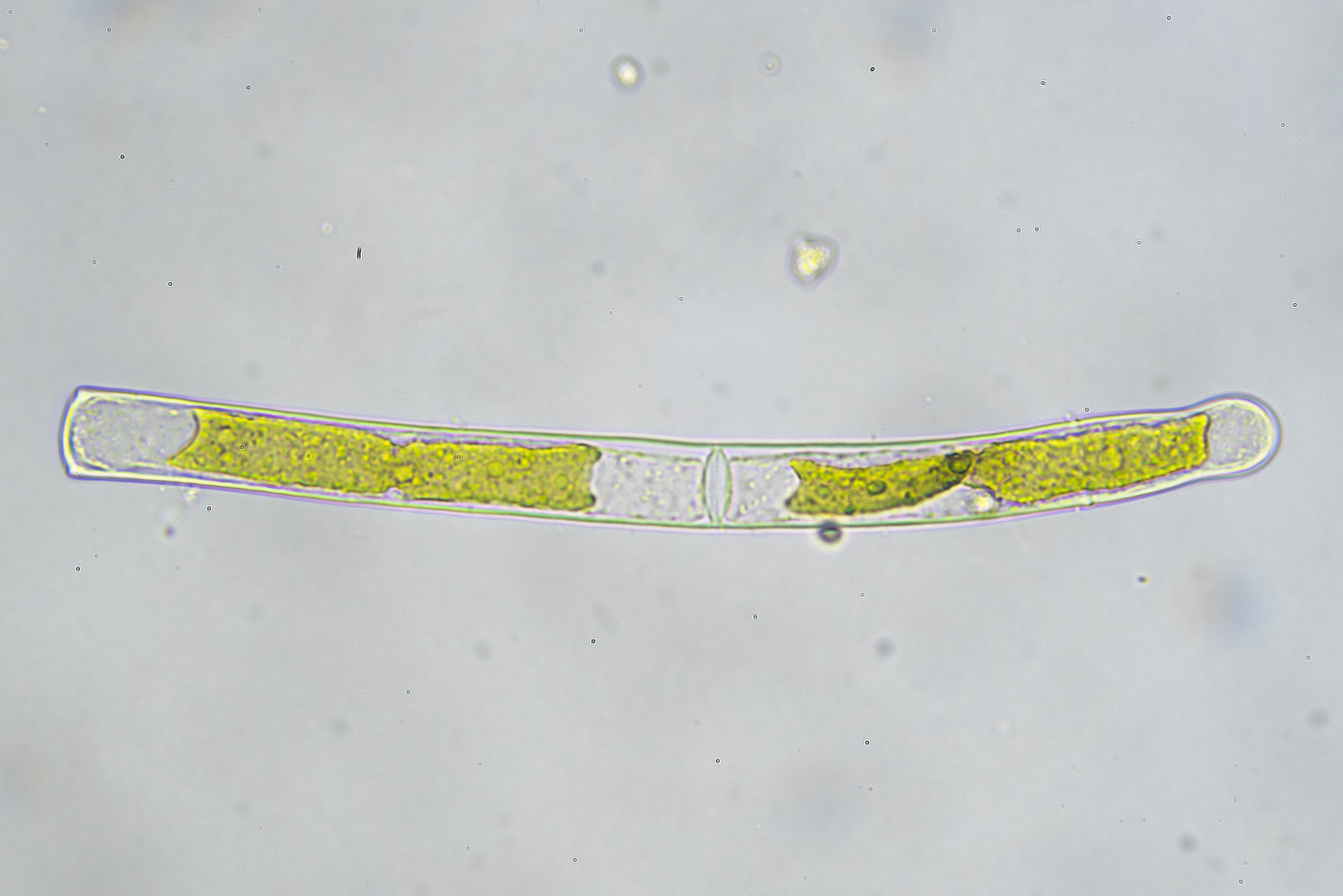

Scientific classification
- Kingdom: Plantae
- Class: Zygnematophyceae
- Order: Zygnematales
- Family: Zygnemataceae
- Genus: Mougeotia; C.Agardh, 1824

Type species
- Mougeotia genuflexa (Roth) C.Agardh, 1824

Species
- See text.

= Mougeotia =

Genus of algae

Mougeotia is a genus of filamentous charophyte green algae of the order Zygnematales. It is a common component of freshwater aquatic habitats around the world. Described in 1824 by Carl Adolph Agardh, its name honors the French botanist Jean-Baptiste Mougeot.

== Description ==
Mougeotia forms uniserial (one cell thick) chains of cells, called filaments, that are usually unbranched; in certain conditions, it forms branched filaments. Cells are cylindrical, many times longer than wide. Each cell has one or two flat, rectangular and ribbon-shaped chloroplasts that fill the cell. Chloroplasts are able to twist in response to light conditions. The nucleus is located at the center of the cell.

=== Reproduction ===
Mougeotia is able to reproduce sexually, through a process known as conjugation. It is isogamous, with two different but identically appearing gamete types.

In scalariform conjugation, cells of two separate filaments line up parallel to one other. Cells of one filament connect to those of the other via a tube.

=== Identification ===
In its vegetative state, Mougeotia appears essentially identical to two other genera, Transeauina and Temnogametum. Transeauina (formerly known as Debarya) is distinguished from Mougeotia in having gametangia filled with layers of pectin giving it a stratified appearance. Temnogametum is a rare genus that is probably restricted to the tropics; it differs from Mougeotia in having spores filled with oil droplets. Mougeotia is also similar to the genus Mougeotiopsis, but the latter genus has chloroplasts that lack pyrenoids.

Species identification depends on observing the morphology of reproductive structures, called zygospores; this is difficult because they are rarely present.

== Chloroplast movement ==
Mougeotia and the related genus Mesotaenium display chloroplast movement in response to light. When exposed to red light or low levels of white light, the chloroplast twists along its long axis until it is perpendicular to the direction of the light, thus achieving maximum irradiation. When exposed to blue and white light at the same time (such as in high levels of white light), the chloroplast rotates to minimize irradiation.

Chloroplast rotation is mediated by phytochrome molecules located at the plasma membrane, as well as an additional pigment that absorbs blue light. When absorbing light, the pigment forms a gradient along the plasma membrane, which is then transduced into a movement response. Although the exact mechanism behind the gradient is unknown, it is known that the chloroplast is moved by F-actin threads attached to the membrane.

== Ecology ==
Mougeotia prefers meso-oligotrophic, especially acidic freshwater habitats and can form algal blooms. Its growth is not optimal under acidic conditions, but Mougeotia can tolerate the heavy metals such as aluminum and zinc that are more biologically available, and is efficient at gathering dissolved inorganic carbon.

Several characteristics of Mougeotia appear to contribute to ability to form blooms. In conditions of where phosphorus is the limiting nutrient, Mougeotia is able to compete well, and its chloroplast can rotate allowing it to persist in lower-light conditions. Its filamentous morphology allows Mougeotia to slow down the rate of sinking. Although Mougeotia is not known to be toxic, it is mostly inedible for zooplankton. In Israel, it has become an invasive species.

== Species ==
As of May 2023, AlgaeBase accepted the following species:

- Mougeotia abnormis Kisselev
- Mougeotia acadiana Transeau
- Mougeotia adnata M.O.P.Iyengar
- Mougeotia americana Transeau
- Mougeotia angolensis West & G.S.West
- Mougeotia angusta (Hassall) Czurda
- Mougeotia areolata Transeau
- Mougeotia aspera Woronichin
- Mougeotia atubulosa H.Krieger
- Mougeotia austriaca Czurda
- Mougeotia badia C.C.Jao & Y.X.Wei
- Mougeotia banneergattensis Iyengar
- Mougeotia bicalyptrata Wittrock
- Mougeotia birecava C.C.Jao
- Mougeotia boodlei (West & G.S West) Collins
- Mougeotia caelestis Transeau
- Mougeotia caimanii Transeau
- Mougeotia calcarea (Cleve) Wittrock
- Mougeotia capucina C.Agardh
- Mougeotia castanea Wei
- Mougeotia cherokeana Taft
- Mougeotia chlamydata Prescott
- Mougeotia compressa Liu
- Mougeotia congolensis Gauthier-Lièvre
- Mougeotia conifera C.-C.Jao & H.J.Hu
- Mougeotia corniculata Hansgirg
- Mougeotia costata O.Bock & W.Bock
- Mougeotia cotopaxiensis Prescott
- Mougeotia crassa (Wolle) De Toni
- Mougeotia craterophora Bohlin
- Mougeotia cyanea Transeau
- Mougeotia cylindrospora Gauthier-Lièvre
- Mougeotia daytonae Transeau
- Mougeotia delicata Beck
- Mougeotia depressa (Hassall) Wittrock
- Mougeotia disjuncta Transeau
- Mougeotia djalonensis Gauthier-Lièvre
- Mougeotia elegantula Wittrock
- Mougeotia ellipsoidea (West & G.S.West) Czurda
- Mougeotia faurelii Gauthier-Lièvre
- Mougeotia faveolatospora Kirjakov
- Mougeotia floridana Transeau
- Mougeotia fossa O.Bock & W.Bock
- Mougeotia fragilis (Zeller) De Toni
- Mougeotia fujianensis H.P.Zheng & Z.H.Chen
- Mougeotia gelatinosa Wittrock
- Mougeotia geniculata Chian
- Mougeotia genuflexa (Roth) C.Agardh
- Mougeotia globulispora C.-C.Jao
- Mougeotia gotlandica (Cleve) Wittrock
- Mougeotia gracillima (Hassall) Wittrock
- Mougeotia granulata C.-C.Jao & H.J.Hu
- Mougeotia granulosa Transeau
- Mougeotia guadalupensis Caballero
- Mougeotia guanahacabibensis Rieth
- Mougeotia handelii Skuja
- Mougeotia hebeiana Liang & Wang
- Mougeotia heterogama Geitler
- Mougeotia hirnii Transeau
- Mougeotia horniculata Kargupta & R.N.Jha
- Mougeotia hupehensis C.-C.Jao & Hu
- Mougeotia indica Randhawa
- Mougeotia irregularis West & G.S.West
- Mougeotia islamii R.J.Patel & Ashok Kumar
- Mougeotia japonica Yamagishi
- Mougeotia jilinensis C.C.Jao & Y.X.Wei
- Mougeotia kerguelensis Willi Krieger
- Mougeotia kunjukuttii R.J.Patel & Ashok Kumar
- Mougeotia kwangsiensis C.-C.Jao
- Mougeotia lacustris C.C.Jao & Y.X.Wei
- Mougeotia laetevirens (A.Braun) Wittrock
- Mougeotia laevis (Kützing) W.Archer
- Mougeotia lamellosa C.-C.Jao
- Mougeotia latireticulata Zheng
- Mougeotia longiarticulata A.K.Islam
- Mougeotia macrospora (Wolle) De Toni
- Mougeotia maltae Skuja
- Mougeotia mayorii G.S.West
- Mougeotia megaspora Wittrock
- Mougeotia mesocarpiana Ferrer & Cáceres
- Mougeotia miamiana Transeau
- Mougeotia micropora Taft
- Mougeotia micropunctata Yamagishi
- Mougeotia microverrucosa H.Krieger
- Mougeotia minutissima Lemmermann
- Mougeotia nayarhatensis (A.K.Islam) Kadlubowska
- Mougeotia neocaledonica Bourrelly
- Mougeotia ningxiaensis Ling & Zheng
- Mougeotia notabilis Hassall
- Mougeotia nummuloides (Hassall) De Toni
- Mougeotia oblongata Transeau
- Mougeotia obuchovae Rundina
- Mougeotia oedogonioides Czurda
- Mougeotia olivacea Y.J.Ling
- Mougeotia opelousasensis Taft
- Mougeotia operculata Transeau
- Mougeotia ornata C.-C.Jao
- Mougeotia ovalis (Hassall) Wittrock & Nordstedt
- Mougeotia ovalispora Krieger
- Mougeotia padulosa G.S.West
- Mougeotia paludosa G.S.West
- Mougeotia parvireticulata C.-C.Jao & H.-J.Hu
- Mougeotia parvula Hassall
- Mougeotia pawhuskae Taft
- Mougeotia pectosa Transeau
- Mougeotia perforata Gauthier-Lièvre
- Mougeotia pitotiana Gauthier-Lièvre
- Mougeotia poinciana Transeau
- Mougeotia polymorpha Geitler
- Mougeotia pomifera Margalef
- Mougeotia producta West & G.S.West
- Mougeotia prona Transeau
- Mougeotia pseudo-opelousasensis Gauthier-Lièvre
- Mougeotia pseudocalospora Czurda
- Mougeotia pseudovarians Gauthier-Lièvre
- Mougeotia pulchella (Wittrock) De Toni
- Mougeotia punctata (Wittrock) De Toni
- Mougeotia qinghaiensis Zheng
- Mougeotia quadrangulata Hassall
- Mougeotia quadrangulata R.N.Jha & Kargupta
- Mougeotia quadrata Randhawa
- Mougeotia radicans (Kützing) Rabenhorst
- Mougeotia rava Transeau
- Mougeotia rectangularis H.Krieger
- Mougeotia recurva (Hassall) De Toni
- Mougeotia regelii Skuja
- Mougeotia reticulata Hassall
- Mougeotia robusta (De Bary) Wittrock
- Mougeotia rotundangulata C.-C.Jao
- Mougeotia sanfordiana Tiffany
- Mougeotia scalaris Hassall
- Mougeotia scrobiculata Gauthier-Lièvre
- Mougeotia semioleana Tiffany
- Mougeotia sestertisignifera Stephen Skinner
- Mougeotia sexangularis C.C.Jao
- Mougeotia sinensis L.C.Li
- Mougeotia smithii F.E.Fritsch
- Mougeotia sphaerospora (Borge) Czurda
- Mougeotia sphareocarpa Wolle
- Mougeotia subcorniculata Gauthier-Lièvre
- Mougeotia subcrassa G.S.West
- Mougeotia subellipsoidea A.K.Islam
- Mougeotia submegaspora C.-C.Jao & H.-J.Hu
- Mougeotia subpaludosa Ley
- Mougeotia subpulchella Liu Lian
- Mougeotia subpunctata C.-C.Jao
- Mougeotia subrava Zheng
- Mougeotia tenerrima G.S.West
- Mougeotia tenuis (Cleve) Wittrock
- Mougeotia tenuissima (De Bary) Czurda
- Mougeotia thylespora Skuja
- Mougeotia tibestica Gauthier-Lièvre
- Mougeotia tibetica C.C.Jao & Y.X.Wei
- Mougeotia transeaui Collins
- Mougeotia transversalis Hassall
- Mougeotia trapaeziformis M.O.P.Iyengar
- Mougeotia tropica (West & G.S.West) Transeau
- Mougeotia tubifera Tiffany
- Mougeotia tumidula Transeau
- Mougeotia turicensis Nipkow
- Mougeotia uberosperma West & G.S.West
- Mougeotia varians (Wittrock) Czurda
- Mougeotia ventricosa (Wittrock) Collins
- Mougeotia venustula C.-C.Jao & H.J.Hu
- Mougeotia verruculosa C.-C.Jao
- Mougeotia victoriensis G.S.West
- Mougeotia violacea Kützing
- Mougeotia virescens (Hassall) O.Borge
- Mougeotia viridis (Kützing) Wittrock
- Mougeotia viscosa C.C.Jao & H.J.Hu
- Mougeotia yinchuanensis Ling & Zheng
- Mougeotia yunnanensis C.-Y.Chian
