= Zygnemopsis desmidioides =

Scientific classification
- Kingdom: Plantae
- Class: Zygnematophyceae
- Order: Zygnematales
- Family: Zygnemataceae
- Genus: Zygnemopsis
- Species: Z. desmidioides

Binomial name
- Zygnemopsis desmidioides (West & G.S.West) Transeau, 1934

Species of alga

Zygnemopsis desmidioides is a species of alga belonging to the family Zygnemataceae.

Synonyms:

- Debarya desmidioides West & G.S.West [= basionym]
