= Spinoclosterium =

Scientific classification
- Kingdom: Plantae
- Class: Zygnematophyceae
- Order: Desmidiales
- Family: Closteriaceae
- Genus: Spinoclosterium; C.Bernard

Species
- S. cuspidatum

Genus of algae

Spinoclosterium is a genus of green algae, specifically of the Closteriaceae. It is rare, but widely distributed in freshwater regions throughout the world.

== Description ==
Spinoclosterium consists of solitary cells. Cells are relatively large, flattened, and are crescent-shaped in outline. The midregion is somewhat widened. The apices are broadly rounded to subcapitate, and are furnished with a stout, straight spine. Cells consist of two symmetrical halves, called semicells. Each semicell contains a single, axial chloroplast containing several pyrenoids scattered throughout. Each cell apex contains a vacuole.

With its crescent-shaped cells, Spinoclosterium is similar to its sister genus Closterium, but is easily distinguished by the tips of the cells bearing a spine.

== Reproduction ==
Spinoclosterium is able to reproduce asexually and sexually. It is unusual for its mode of asexual cell division, which involves a pale pink granular mucilage. The cell secretes this mucilage in a ring around its midregion, then completes mitosis and divides into two daughter cells. Like other desmids, the two daughter cells are asymmetrical at this stage, with one adult semicell and one newly formed semicell. However, the mucilage holds the two cells roughly in place until cells are fully developed in size. This means that unlike other desmids that finish cell division with daughter cells aligned head-to-head, the daughter cells of Spinoclosterium are aligned side-to-side.

Sexual reproduction is anisogamous, with male and female gametes. Cells reproduce sexually by conjugating. The female cell lies next to the male cell and the two form a tube between them. The protoplast of the male cell shrinks inside and moves through the tube into the female cell, forming a zygote. The zygote matures into a full zygospore after a few days; the zygospore is irregularly ellipsoid in shape.

When the zygospore germinates, it releases its contents and meiosis occurs, of which two of the four meiotic producte survive and the other two are aborted. The post-meiotic cells (called two gones) form an additional cell wall, and finally the each gone divides into two asymmetrical juvenile cells, releasing the cells by gelatinization of the double cell wall.
