= Brazilea =

Brazilea Temporal range: Permian

Scientific classification
- Domain: Eukaryota
- Supergroup: Archaeplastida
- Clade: Viridiplantae
- Class: Zygnematophyceae
- Order: Zygnematales
- Family: Zygnemataceae
- Genus: †Brazilea; R.S.Tiwari & Navale

Species
- Brazilea crassa Tiwari & Navale, 1967; Brazilea helbyi Foster, 1979; Brazilea parva (Cookson & Dettmann, 1959) Backhouse, 1988; Brazilea plurigena (Balme & Hennelly, 1956) Foster, 1979; Brazilea punctata Tiwari & Navale, 1967; Brazilea scissa

Extinct genus of algae

Brazilea is an extinct genus of algae. The species Brazilea helby and Brazilea scissa were located in outcrop Morro do Papaléo in the town of Mariana Pimentel, the geopark Paleorrota. The outcrop (Itararé Subgroup) dates to the Sakmarian of the Permian.
