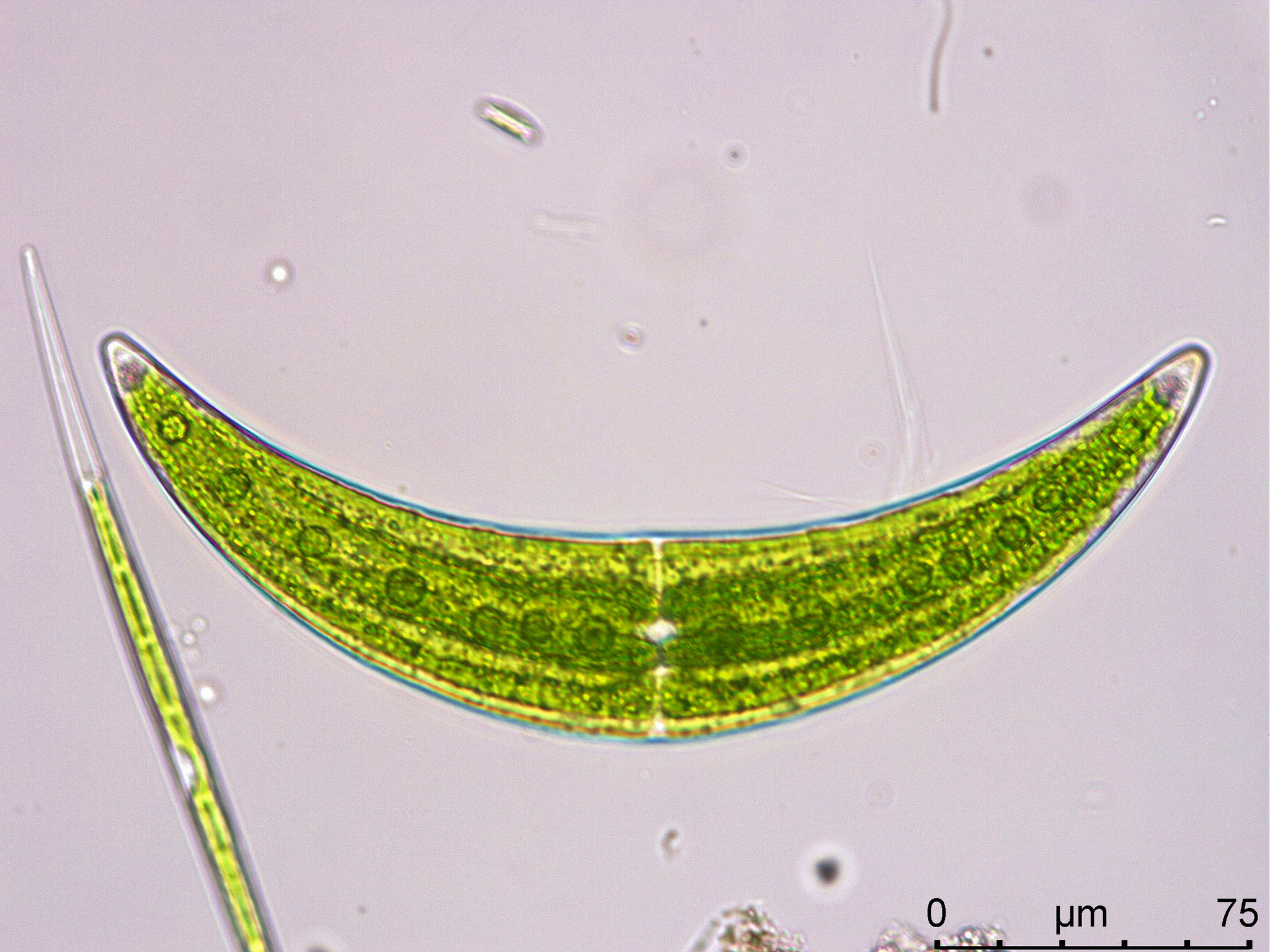

Scientific classification
- Kingdom: Plantae
- Class: Zygnematophyceae
- Order: Desmidiales
- Family: Closteriaceae
- Genus: Closterium
- Species: C. moniliferum

Binomial name
- Closterium moniliferum Ehrenberg ex Ralfs 1848

= Closterium moniliferum =

Species of alga

Closterium moniliferum is a species of unicellular charophyte green algae in the family Closteriaceae. It has a cosmopolitan distribution, and is found in fresh water over a wide range of pH.
