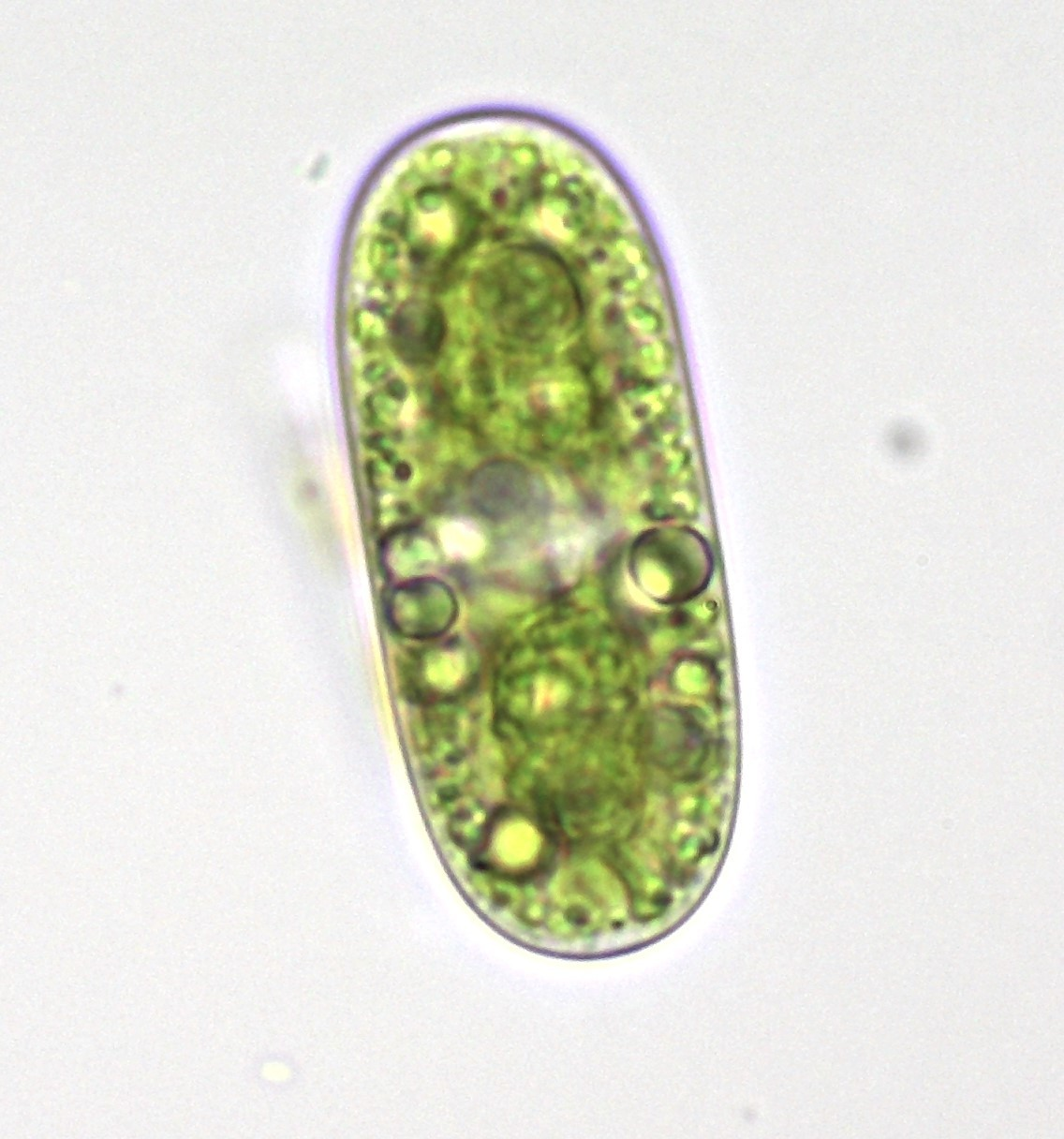
- Cylindrocystis brebissonii

Scientific classification
- Kingdom: Plantae
- Division: Charophyta
- Class: Zygnematophyceae
- Order: Zygnematales
- Family: Mesotaeniaceae
- Genus: Cylindrocystis; Meneghini, 1848

= Cylindrocystis =

Genus of algae

Cylindrocystis is a genus of algae belonging to the family Zygnemataceae. This genus displays a very simple morphology, characterized by an elongated-cylindrical cell shape, a lack of cell wall ornamentation, and two axial stellate chloroplasts with a centrally located nucleus. Each chloroplast contains a single, often elongated pyrenoid. Cylindrocystis cells are found growing solitarily, sometimes forming aggregrations inside of a gelatinous matrix. Phylogenetic studies by Gontcharov, et al (2010), Barcytė, et al. (2020) and Hess, et al. (2022) have outlined the polyphyletic state of said genus, outlining multiple distinct lineages of supposed Cylindrocystis members which seem more closely related to other members of Zygnematales rather than the type species clade of Cylindocystis brebissonii.

The species of this genus are found in Europe and America.

Species:

- Cylindrocystis angulatum West & West
- Cylindrocystis cylindrospora (Brebisson) Drouet & Dailey
- Cylindrocystis diplospora Lund
- Cylindrocystis minutissima Turner
- Cylindrocystis obesa West & West
- Cylindrocystis splendida Taft
