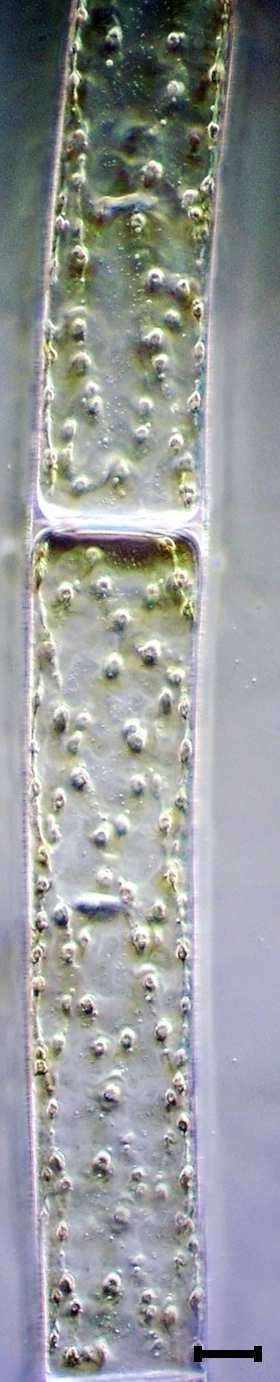
- Sirogonium

Scientific classification
- Kingdom: Plantae
- Class: Zygnematophyceae
- Order: Zygnematales
- Family: Zygnemataceae
- Genus: Sirogonium; Kützing 1843

Type species
- Sirogonium sticticum (Smith) Kützing

Species
- 21; see text.

= Sirogonium =

Genus of algae

Sirogonium is a genus of filamentous charophyte green algae of the order Spirogyrales. It is found in freshwater areas on all continents but Antarctica. Spirogyra measures approximately 32–115 μm in width. Each cell contains 2–10 chloroplasts in a ribbon, in contrast to the closely related genus Spirogyra, which has chloroplasts in a coil. Molecular phylogenetic studies have placed Sirogonium inside a clade consisting of Spirogyra species; in other words, Spirogyra is paraphyletic with respect to Sirogonium.

== Species ==
The following species are currently accepted:

- Sirogonium calosporum Zhu
- Sirogonium ceylanicum Wittrock
- Sirogonium decoratum Prescott
- Sirogonium denticulatum W.J.Zhu
- Sirogonium floridanum (Transeau) G.M.Smith
- Sirogonium fuscosporum Woodhead & Tweed
- Sirogonium guangzhouense Zhu
- Sirogonium hui (L.C.Li) Transeau
- Sirogonium illinoisense (Transeau) G.M.Smith
- Sirogonium indicum Singh
- Sirogonium inflatum Dixit
- Sirogonium kamatii Kadlubowska
- Sirogonium khoriense Masud-ul-Hassan & M.Nizamuddin
- Sirogonium melanosporum (Randhawa) Transeau
- Sirogonium phacosporum Skuja
- Sirogonium pseudofloridanum (Prescott) Transeau
- Sirogonium reticulatum Randhawa
- Sirogonium retroversum H.C.Wood
- Sirogonium sticticum (Smith) Kützing
- Sirogonium vandalurense Iyengar
- Sirogonium ventersicum Transeau
