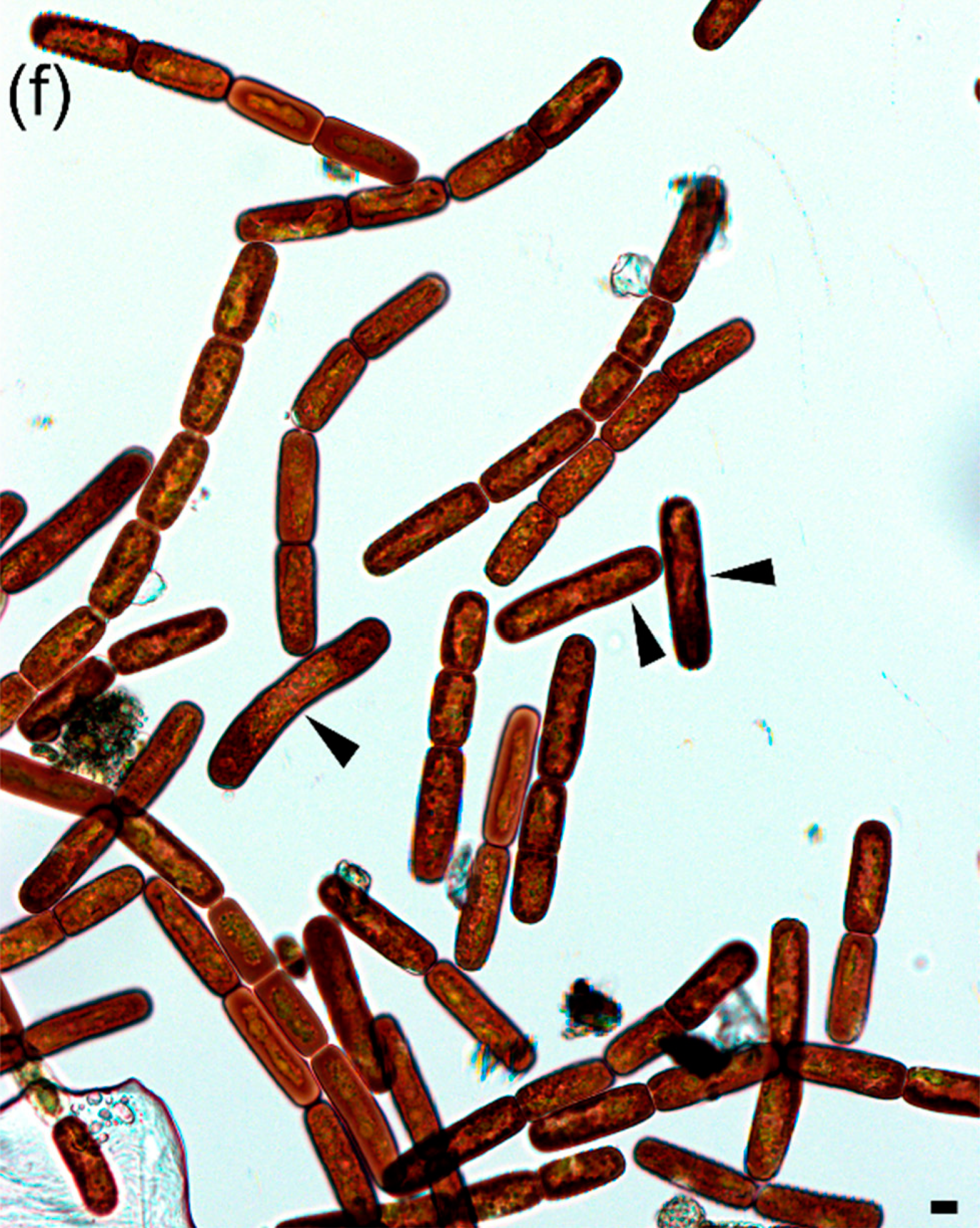
- Ancylonema nordenskioeldii

Scientific classification
- Domain: Eukaryota
- Clade: Archaeplastida
- Clade: Viridiplantae
- Class: Zygnematophyceae
- Order: Zygnematales
- Family: Mesotaeniaceae
- Genus: Ancylonema; Berggren, 1872

Type species
- Ancylonema nordenskioeldii Berggren

Species
- Ancylonema alaskanum; Ancylonema palustre; Ancylonema nordenskioeldii

= Ancylonema =

Genus of algae

Ancylonema is a genus of green algae belonging to the family Mesotaeniaceae. This genus is known to include psychrophilic species found on surfaces of glaciers and ice sheets. Recently, a mesophilic species, Ancylonema palustre, has also been discovered from the temperate moorlands of western Germany. One example of the genus is the species Ancylonema nordenkioeldii, which has been known to be an important part of the algal communities on glacial ice surfaces in Greenland and Norway. Psychrophilic members of Ancylonema have been recorded to participate in algal blooms on glacial ice surfaces, reducing the albedo of glacier surfaces and consequently accelerating melting of the ice.

== Taxonomy ==
Ancylonema belongs to the class Zygnematophyceae, a sister clade to the Embryophyta, including all of the land plants. The Ancylonema species form a well-supported clade within the family Mesotaeniaceae during metagenome analysis. Studies using both morphological and genetic markers have designated three species within the genus, namely Ancylonema alaskanum, Ancylonema nordenskioeldii, and Ancylonema palustre.

Phylogenetic analysis conducted using the rbcL gene showed that the mesophilic species A. palustre forms a well-supported subclade distinct from another subclade consisting of the two psychrophilic species. Within the psychrophilic subclade, taxonomic issues remain under debate due to the insufficiency of lab cultures and the reliance on environmental samples. Morphologically, the species A. alaskanum exhibit large variations in cell width, an important morphological marker for the genus. It is possible the diversity of the psychrophilic subclade is greater than currently recognized.

== Morphology ==
The genus consists of both unicellular (A. alaskanum, A. palustre) and filamentous (A. nordenskioeldii) species. Generally, the cells are cylindrical-shaped with rounded apexes. The lengths and widths of the cells vary between species, and cell width has been observed as a distinguishing character between species. The cell walls are smooth and undifferentiated, with varying thickness across species.

In terms of cellular structures, each cell possesses one to two parietal chloroplasts located to the side of the cell. Each chloroplast typically possesses a single circular pyrenoid. The shape of the chloroplasts may be discoid, cup-shaped, or flattened-lobed. Chloroplast morphology is a defining character for the genus, separating the genus from the rest of Mesotaeniaceae, which features a single axial plate-like chloroplast per cell. The nucleus is usually located at the center of the cell. Secondary pigmentation of purpurogallin derivatives is found in the vacuoles, which often results in brownish coloration of the cell.

== Habitat ==
=== Psychrophilic species ===
The psychrophilic species A. alaskanum and A. nordenskioeldii inhabit the surfaces of glaciers and ice sheets. They have been observed in polar and high-alpine regions around the globe, including but not limited to the Himalayas, Svalbard, Greenland, and Alaska. The psychrophilic algae's unique adaptations allow them to tolerate the low temperature and high solar radiation of these habitats.

=== Mesophilic species ===
The mesophilic species A. palustre inhabits the temperate moorlands of western Germany. When compared to the habitats of the psychrophilic species, the temperature of the moorlands is higher year-round, while the level of solar radiation is lower. The lower altitudes, potential shading by plants and sediments, and the radiation-absorbing property of water all play a part in lowering the amount of radiation in these habitats.

== Life cycle ==
=== Asexual reproduction ===
Ancylonema species have been known to undergo both asexual and sexual reproduction. As an example, the asexual reproduction cycle of A. palustre features six distinct stages. The cell division starts with duplication of pyrenoids within the chloroplasts, followed by nuclear fission. The two nuclei move laterally toward either side of the cell, and a cross wall forms at the center. The chloroplasts then start to divide, and the daughter cells separate in the final stage.

=== Sexual reproduction ===
In terms of sexual reproduction, zygospore formation has only been clearly documented in the species A. palustre. In A. palustre, the process involves conjugation where the zygote exits the parent cells to form an initial spherical zygospore. As the zygote matures, it develops into a zygospore with three cell wall layers (endo-, meso-, and exospore). The mesospore deforms to give the zygospore its characteristic polyhedral geometry. Observations have been made of A. nordenskioeldii forming smooth-surfaced spherical zygospores and irregular zygotes with prominent conjugation bridges. However, further studies are required to elucidate the sexual reproduction process in the psychrophilic Ancylonema species.

== Secondary pigmentation & algal blooms ==
=== Secondary pigmentation ===
All members of Ancylonema have been shown to synthesize secondary pigmentation of a brownish color. These pigments have been determined to consist of purpurogallin derivatives and possess broad absorption capacity covering the entire UVA and UVB regions and a large part of the VIS region. Experiments have shown biosynthesis of these pigments are induced under UVA and UVB treatments, suggesting that these secondary pigmentations play a photoprotective role in protecting the cellular structures against high irradiance.

=== Algal blooms ===
During the summer melt seasons, the psychrophilic Ancylonema species participate in algal blooms that see huge quantities of psychrophilic algae reproducing on the surfaces of glaciers and ice sheets. The secondary pigmentation in these algae leads to macroscopically visible colorations on the ice surface. As a result, the albedo of the ice is reduced, resulting in increased abosrbance of solar radiation and accelerated melting of ice. In some cases, these algal blooms can have significant effects on the polar ecosystems and the global sea-level as a whole.
