= Closterium setaceum =

Scientific classification
- Kingdom: Plantae
- Class: Zygnematophyceae
- Order: Desmidiales
- Family: Closteriaceae
- Genus: Closterium
- Species: C. setaceum

Binomial name
- Closterium setaceum Ehrenberg ex Ralfs 1848

Subspecies
- Closterium setaceum var. elongatum W. West & G.S. West; Closterium setaceum var. vittatum GrÃnblad

Synonyms
- Closterium elegans Brébisson

Species of alga

Closterium setaceum is a species of unicellular charophyte green algae in the family Closteriaceae. It has a cosmopolitan distribution, and is typically found in oligotrophic to mesotrophic waters, with a pH of 4.5 to 6.

Closterium setaceum consists of very narrow cells about (150–)220–450(–610) μm long and (6–)8–13(–16) μm wide. The central portion of the cell is fusiform, with the dorsal and ventral sides of the central region of the cell being equally curved. The apices are drawn out into long, slender tips which are curved at the end with rounded or rounded-truncate tips. Each chloroplast contains two or three pyrenoids. The cell wall is colorless or brownish and is faintly striate with a density of 7 to 13 striae per 10 μm, or appears smooth. Zygospores are rectangular with concave sides.

Closterium setaceum is similar to Closterium kuetzingii and Closterium rostratum. In contrast to those species, however, the colorless ends of C. setaceum are generally longer than the central green midregion of the cell. In addition, the cells of C. setaceum are mostly narrower than 15 μm.
