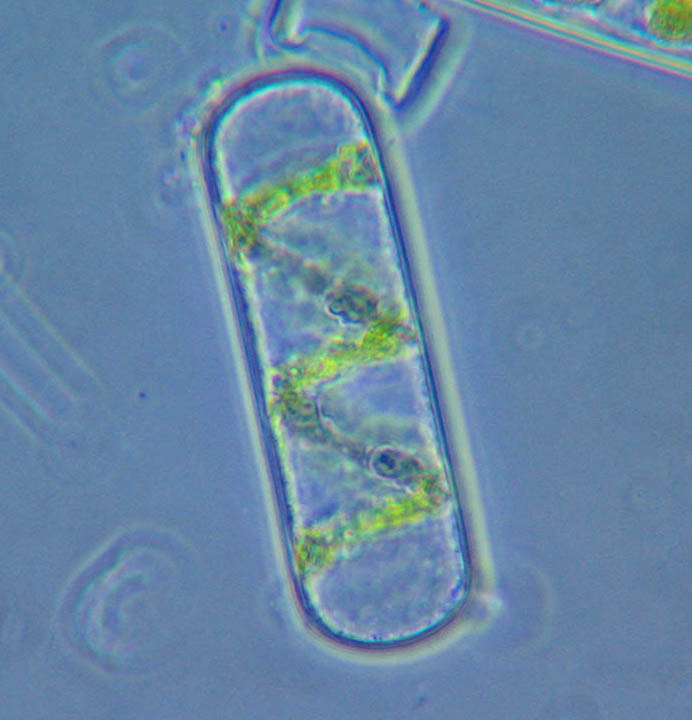
- Spirogyra sp.

Scientific classification
- Domain: Eukaryota
- Supergroup: Archaeplastida
- Clade: Viridiplantae
- Class: Zygnematophyceae
- Order: Zygnematales
- Family: Zygnemataceae; Kützing, 1843

Subgroups
- Desmidiales; Ancylonema Berggren, 1872; †Brazilea R.S.Tiwari & Navale; †Cycloovoidites Krutzsch & Pacltová, 1990; Cylindrocystis Meneghini ex De Bary, 1858; Geniculus Prescott, 1967; Ghosella Randhawa, 1934; Lloydina A.Ahmad & M.Goldstein, 1972; Mougeotia C.Agardh, 1824; Mougeotiella Yamagishi, 1963; Mougeotiopsis Palla, 1894; Neozygnema Yamagishi, 1963; Netrium (Nägeli) Itzigsohn & Rothe, 1856; Nucleotaenium Gontcharov & Melkonian, 2010; †Ovoidites Potonié, 1966; Planotaenium (Ohtani) Petlovany & Palamar-Mordvintseva, 2009; Roya West & G.S.West, 1896; Sangirellum A.K.Mahato & P.Mahato, 1994; Sirocladium Randhawa, 1941; Sirogonium Kützing, 1843; Spirogyra Link, 1820; †Stigmozygodites Krutzsch & Pacltová, 1990; Temnogametum West & G.S.West, 1897; Temnogyra I.F.Lewis, 1925; Tortitaenia A.J.Brook, 1998; Transeauina Guiry, 2013; Trigonum A.K.Mahato & P.Mahato, 1994; Zygnema C.Agardh, 1817; Zygnemopsis (Skuja) Transeau, 1934; Zygogonium Kützing, 1843

Synonyms
- Zygnemeae Kützing, 1843

= Zygnemataceae =

Family of algae

The Zygnemataceae are a family of filamentous or unicellular, uniseriate (unbranched) green algae. The filaments are septated and reproduction is by conjugation; Spirogyra is commonly used in schools to demonstrate this kind of reproduction. The family is notable for its diversely shaped chloroplasts, such as stellate in Zygnema, helical in Spirogyra, and flat in Mougeotia. The Zygnemataceae are cosmopolitan, but though all generally occur in the same types of habitats, Mougeotia, Spirogyra, and Zygnema are by far the most common; in one study across North America, 95% of the Zygnemataceae collected were in these three genera. Classification and identification is primarily by the morphology of the conjugation, which is somewhat rare to find in natural populations of permanent water bodies; when in the vegetative state, the rarer genera resemble the three most common, and are often mistaken for them and catalogued as such. Conjugation can be induced in low-nitrogen culture. While they occupy many habitats, in North America all are found solely in freshwater or subaerial habitats. Species typically exist as floating mats in stagnant water in ditches and ponds, but some also grow in moving water, attaching themselves to a substrate by rhizoid-like projections of the basal cells of the filament. The mat species rise to the surface in early spring, grow rapidly through the summer, disappearing by late summer. Members of the Zygnemataceae, such as Spirogyra, fall prey to parasites, especially chytrids. Most genera (all except Mesotaenium and Spirotaenia) previously assigned to Mesotaeniaceae as well as the Desmidiales actually emerged in the Zygnematacae.
