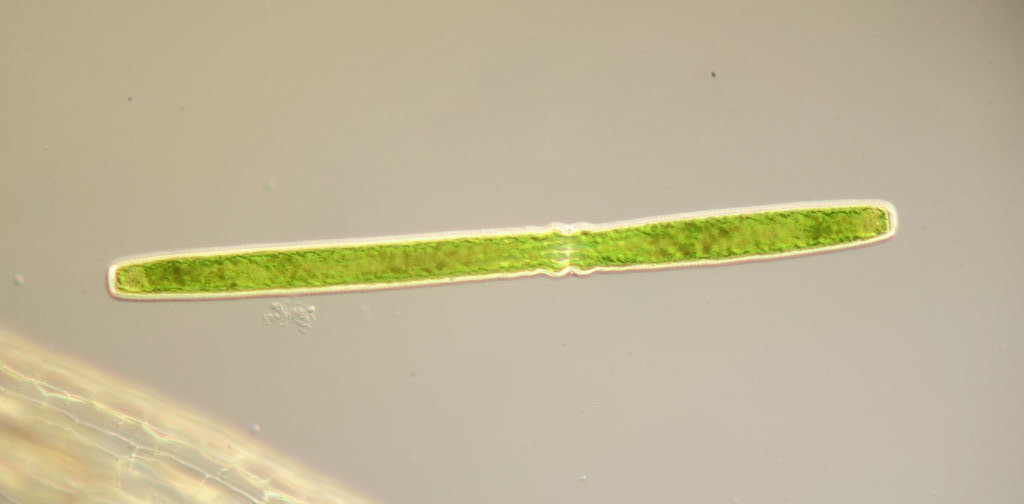
- Docidium baculum

Scientific classification
- Kingdom: Plantae
- Class: Zygnematophyceae
- Order: Desmidiales
- Family: Desmidiaceae
- Genus: Docidium; Brébisson ex Ralfs, 1848

Type species
- Docidium baculum Brébisson ex Ralfs

Species
- Docidium baculum Bréb. ex Ralfs, 1848; Docidium hexagonum (Borge) Willi Krieger; Docidium manubrium West & G.S.West; Docidium undulatum Bailey

= Docidium =

Genus of algae

Docidium is a genus of algae belonging to the family Desmidiaceae. The species of this genus have a cosmopolitan distribution but are rare; they typically occur in acidic, oligotrophic waters.

The name Docidium comes from the Greek term δοκίδιον (dokídion, 'small beam'), referring to its shape.

== Description ==
Docidium consists of elongate, cylindrical cells which are many times longer than broad, and are composed of two identical halves, termed semicells. The apices are truncate and are either smooth or ornamented along the margins. The cell wall is smooth, undulated or annulate and may be covered in pores. At the base of the semicell (near the center of the cell) there is a row of granules/crenations or "teeth". The chloroplast is axile, stellate in cross section, and has a row of several pyrenoids along its length. Sexual reproduction is unknown.

The genus is very similar to Pleurotaenium and Haplotaenium, from which it differs in having a row of teeth at the base of the semicells.
