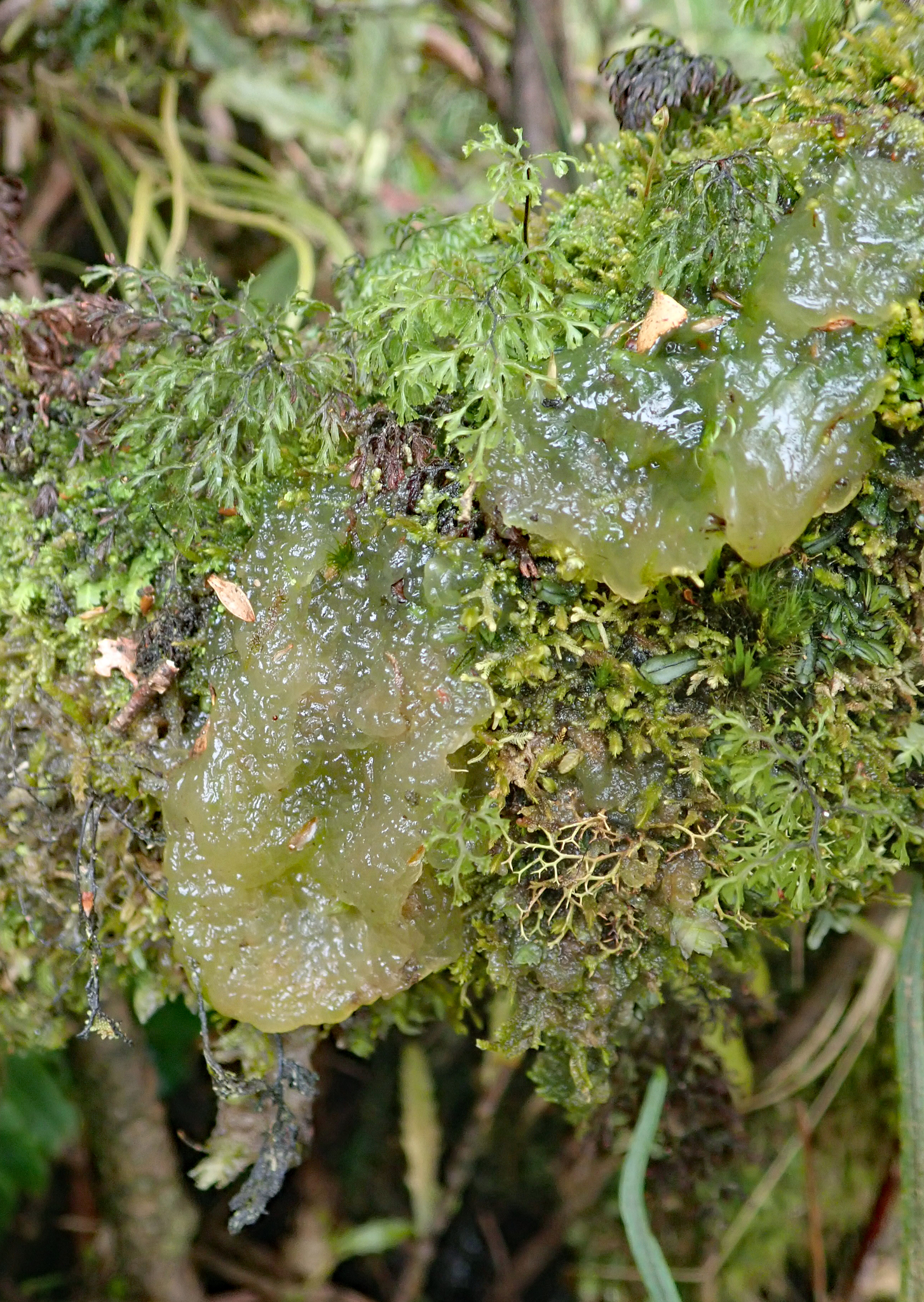
- Mesotaenium macrococcum in New Zealand

Scientific classification
- Kingdom: Plantae
- Class: Zygnematophyceae
- Order: Zygnematales
- Family: Mesotaeniaceae
- Genus: Mesotaenium; Nägeli, 1849

= Mesotaenium =

Genus of algae

Mesotaenium is a genus of algae belonging to the family Mesotaeniaceae.

The species of this genus are found in Europe and Northern America.

Species:

- Mesotaenium aplanosporum C.E.Taft
- Mesotaenium berggrenii (Wittrock) Lagerheim
- Mesotaenium caldariorum (Lagerheim) Hansgirg
- Mesotaenium chlamydosporum de Bary
- Mesotaenium degreyi W.B.Turner
- Mesotaenium dodekahedron Geitler
- Mesotaenium endlicherianum Nägeli
- Mesotaenium fusisporum (P.L.Crouan & H.M.Crouan) De Toni
- Mesotaenium hansgirgii Schmidle
- Mesotaenium heimii Bourrelly
- Mesotaenium kramstae Lemmerm.
- Mesotaenium macrococcum (Kützing) J.Roy & Bisset
- Mesotaenium minimum J.A.Cushman
- Mesotaenium mirificum W.Archer
- Mesotaenium neglectum Reinhard
- Mesotaenium nivale Bek
- Mesotaenium obscurum Lagerh.
- Mesotaenium purpureum West & G.S.West
- Mesotaenium pyrenoidosum (P.A.Broady) Petlovany
- Mesotaenium truncatum West & G.S.West
- Mesotaenium turicense Huber-Pestalozzi
- Mesotaenium violascens De Bary
