= Genicularina =

Scientific classification
- Kingdom: Plantae
- Class: Zygnematophyceae
- Order: Desmidiales
- Family: Gonatozygaceae
- Genus: Genicularina; Molinari & Guiry

Species
- See text.

Synonyms
- Genicularia de Bary

Genus of algae

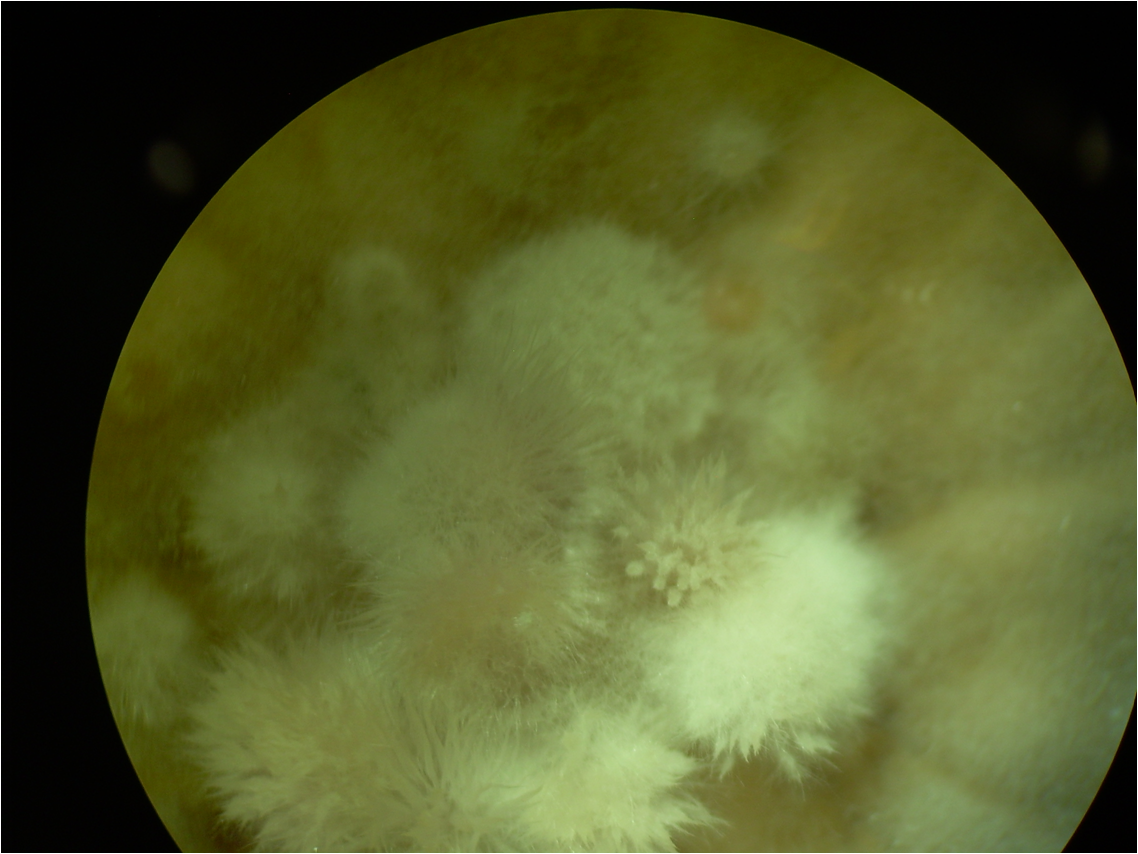
Genicularia grows on an agar plate.

Genicularina is a genus of green algae, specifically of the Gonatozygaceae.

== Genera ==
- Genicularina americana (W.B.Turner) Molinari & Guiry
- Genicularina elegans (West & G.S.West) Molinari & Guiry
- Genicularina spirotaenia (De Bary) Molinari & Guiry
