= Stephanophyllites =

Stephanophyllites Temporal range: Permian

Scientific classification
- Kingdom: Plantae
- Division: Pteridophyta
- Class: Equisetopsida
- Genus: Stephanophyllites

Species
- Stephanophyllites sanpaulensis †

Extinct genus of plants

Stephanophyllites is an extinct genus of plants that lived in the Permian.

== Location ==
In Brazil, the fossil of species indefinite of the genus Stephanophyllites, was located on outcrop Morro Papaléo in the city of Mariana Pimentel. They are in the geopark Paleorrota in Rio Bonito Formation and date from Sakmarian at Permian. The species S. Sanpaulensis was located in the state of São Paulo.

In Argentina, the species S. Sanpaulensis was also located.
