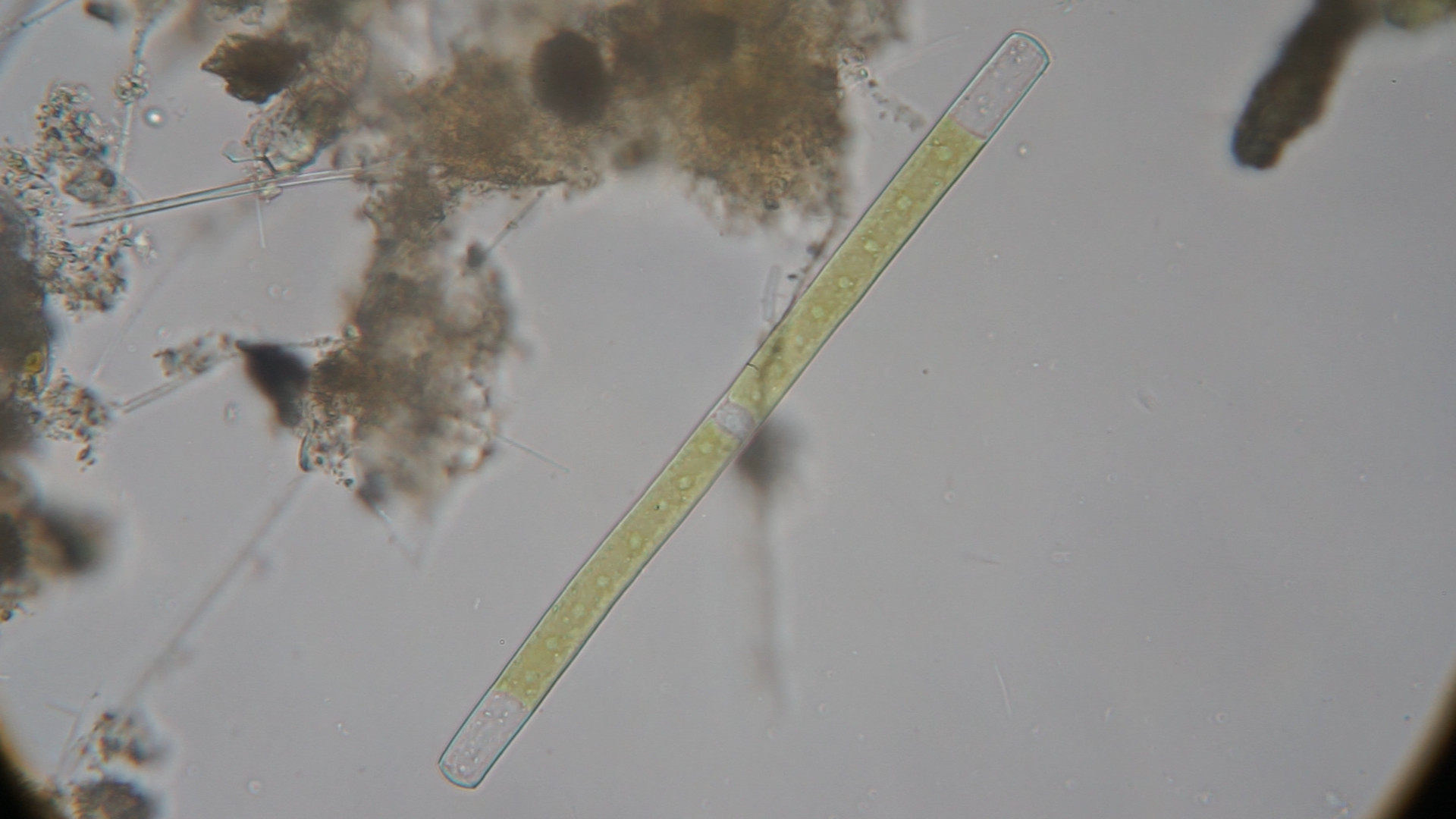

Scientific classification
- Kingdom: Plantae
- Class: Zygnematophyceae
- Order: Desmidiales
- Family: Gonatozygaceae
- Genus: Gonatozygon; De Bary

Species
- G. aculeatum; G. brebissonii; G. kinahanii; G. monotaenium; (partial list)

= Gonatozygon =

Genus of algae

Gonatozygon is a genus of green algae in the family Gonatozygaceae.
