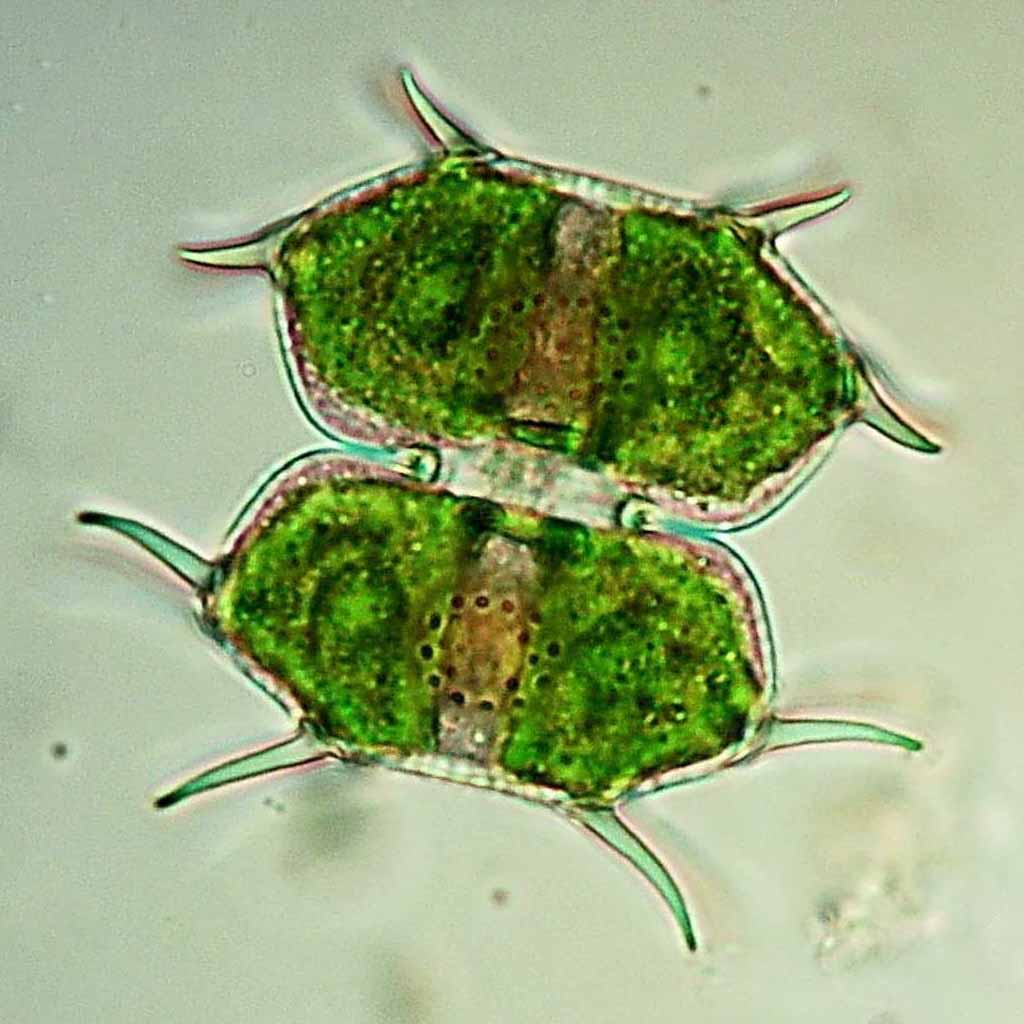

Scientific classification
- Kingdom: Plantae
- Class: Zygnematophyceae
- Order: Desmidiales
- Family: Desmidiaceae
- Genus: Xanthidium
- Species: X. antilopaeum

Binomial name
- Xanthidium antilopaeum Kützing

= Xanthidium antilopaeum =

Species of desmid

Xanthidium antilopaeum is a species of unicellular desmid in the family Desmidiaceae. It is a common, worldwide species found in acidic waters, particularly the edges of large ponds and lakes.

== Description ==
Xanthidium antilopaeum consists of single cells. Cell are symmetrical, with a deep constriction (called an isthmus) dividing the cell into two identical halves called semicells. Cells are about as broad as long, 42–76 μm long and 40–72 μm wide excluding the spines. Semicells are subelliptical to hexagonal with rounded corners. In each semicell, the four corners are extended into a pair of simple, straight or somewhat curved spines.

== Taxonomy ==
Xanthidium antilopaeum is one of the most polymorphic desmid species. Over 93 infraspecific taxa have been described within X. antilopaeum. According to Šťastný et al., many of these taxa have "no phylogenetic value", but some may be so distinctive to be their own species. One such example is Xanthidium basiornatum (formerly Xanthidium antilopaeum var. basiornatum). This species is distinguished from X. antilopaeum by having spines with a stout base, a central protuberance on the semicells, and a row of the 12-14 small pits located next to the isthmus.

Some other varieties include:

- Xanthidium antilopaeum var. dimazum – each semicell has a pair of tubercles next to each other, each surrounded by a ring of pores.
- Xanthidium antilopaeum var. hebridarum – each semicell has three spines on each lateral margin (six spines per semicell), all disposed in a vertical plane.
- Xanthidium antilopaeum var. laeve – compared to the typical variety antilopaeum, it is larger and somewhat longer than broad, and has a more open sinus.
- Xanthidium antilopaeum var. polymazum – the face of the semicells has a distinct arc of granules above the central protuberans.
