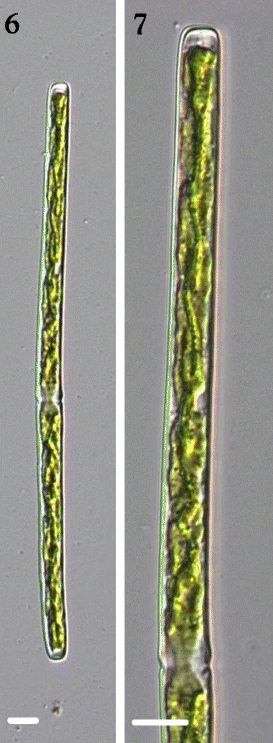
- Haplotaenium minutum var. elongatum

Scientific classification
- Kingdom: Plantae
- Class: Zygnematophyceae
- Order: Desmidiales
- Family: Desmidiaceae
- Genus: Haplotaenium

Species
- H. minutum; H. rectum

= Haplotaenium =

Genus of algae

Haplotaenium is a genus of green algae, specifically of the Desmidiaceae. Species are widespread in acidic, oligotrophic freshwaters.

Haplotaenium consists of solitary, cylindrical cells; the cell consists of two identical halves, called semicells. The semicells are joined at the middle of the cell, where there is a slight constriction called an isthmus. Semicells are slightly swollen at the base and smoothly truncate at the apex. The cell wall is smooth or covered in fine pores. Each semicell has one chloroplast which is axially located, and with a central row of 2–15 pyrenoids; terminal vacuoles are absent. The nucleus is located at the isthmus.

Haplotaenium reproduces asexually and sexually. Asexual reproduction involves cell division at the isthmus, where the two semicells separate and each grow a new semicell. Sexual reproduction involves conjugation; the resulting zygotes are globose and smooth, or with conical projections.

Haplotaenium was split off from Pleurotaenium; it differs from the latter genus in having axial chloroplasts and lacking apical vacuoles. It is also similar to Docidium, from which it differs in lacking a ring or row of granules/teeth at the base of the semicells.
