= Jean-Baptiste Mougeot =

French physician and botanist (1776–1858)

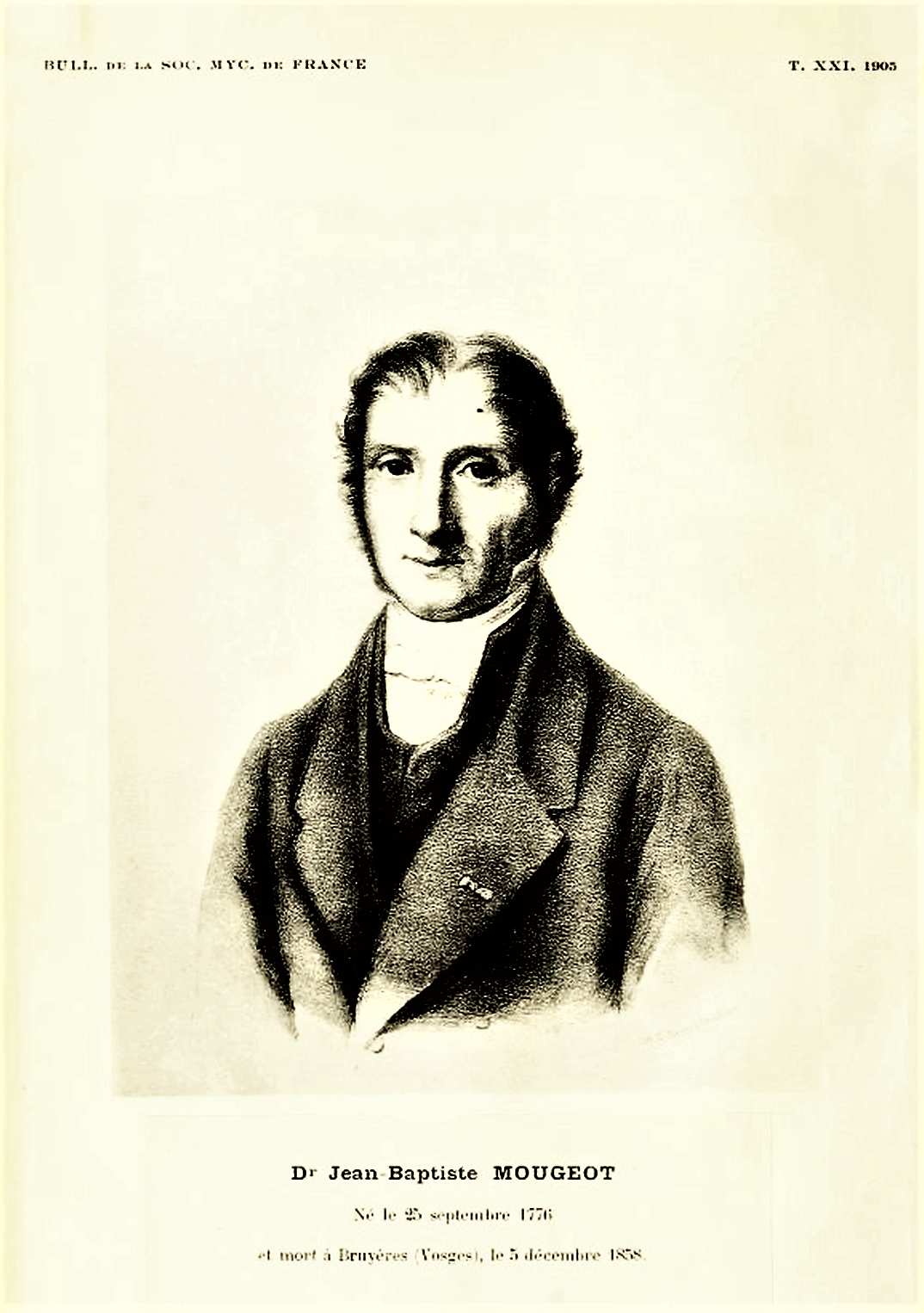
Jean Baptiste Mougeot

Jean-Baptiste Mougeot (25 September 1776, in Bruyères – 5 December 1858) was a French medical doctor and botanist.

From 1798 to 1802, he was stationed in Germany as an army health officer, afterwards returning to his hometown of Bruyères, where he settled as a physician. From 1833 until his death in 1858, he was a member of the conseil général for the département of Vosges. Together with Wilhelm Philippe Schimper, Antoine Mougeot and Chrétien Géofroy Nestler he edited some exsiccatae, among them Stirpes cryptogamae Vogeso-Rhenanae; quas in Rheni superioris inferiorisque, nec non Vogesorum praefecturis collegerunt (1843-1854).

The algae genera Mougeotia and Mougeotiopsis (family Zygnemataceae) are named in his honor. Also, taxa with the specific epithet of mougeotii are named after him, an example being Sorbus mougeotii (Mougeot's whitebeam).

== Published works ==
- "Index alphabeticus: generum, specierum et synonymorum" with Chrétien Géofroy Nestler and Wilhelm Philippe Schimper (1843).
- Considérations générales sur la végétation spontanée du département des Vosges (1845) – General considerations on flora native to the département of Vosges.
- "Stirpes cryptogamæ vogeso-rhenanæ: quas in Rheni superioris inferiorisque, nec non Vogesorum præfecturis" with Chrétien Géofroy Nestler and Wilhelm Philippe Schimper (1854).
