= Chrétien Géofroy Nestler =

French botanist (1777–1832)

Chrétien Géofroy Nestler, name also given as Christian Gottfried Nestler (1 March 1778, Strasbourg – 2 October 1832), was a botanist and pharmacist from Alsace.

He studied under Louis Claude Richard in Paris, and in 1806–1810 served as a military pharmacist. He was later a professor of botany to the faculty of medicine at the University of Strasbourg and a chief pharmacist of Strasbourg hospices. In 1816 he was appointed director of the botanical garden at Strasbourg. Together with Jean-Baptiste Mougeot, Antoine Mougeot and Wilhelm Philippe Schimper he edited some exsiccatae, among them Stirpes cryptogamae Vogeso-Rhenanae; quas in Rheni superioris inferiorisque, nec non Vogesorum praefecturis collegerunt (1843–1854).

As a taxonomist, he described a number of species within the genus Potentilla. The genus Nestlera (family Asteraceae) was named in his honor by Kurt Sprengel.

== Written works ==
- "Monographia de Potentilla præmissis nonnullis observationibus circa familiam Rosacearum". (1816).
- "Index plantarum quae in horto Academ. Argentinensi anno 1817 viguerunt" (1818).
- Notice sur le Sedum repens (1830).
- "Index alphabeticus: generum, specierum et synonymorum", with Jean-Baptiste Mougeot and Wilhelm Philippe Schimper (1843).
- "Stirpes cryptogamæ vogeso-rhenanæ: quas in Rheni superioris inferiorisque, nec non Vogesorum præfecturis", with Jean-Baptiste Mougeot and Wilhelm-Philippe Schimper (1854).
