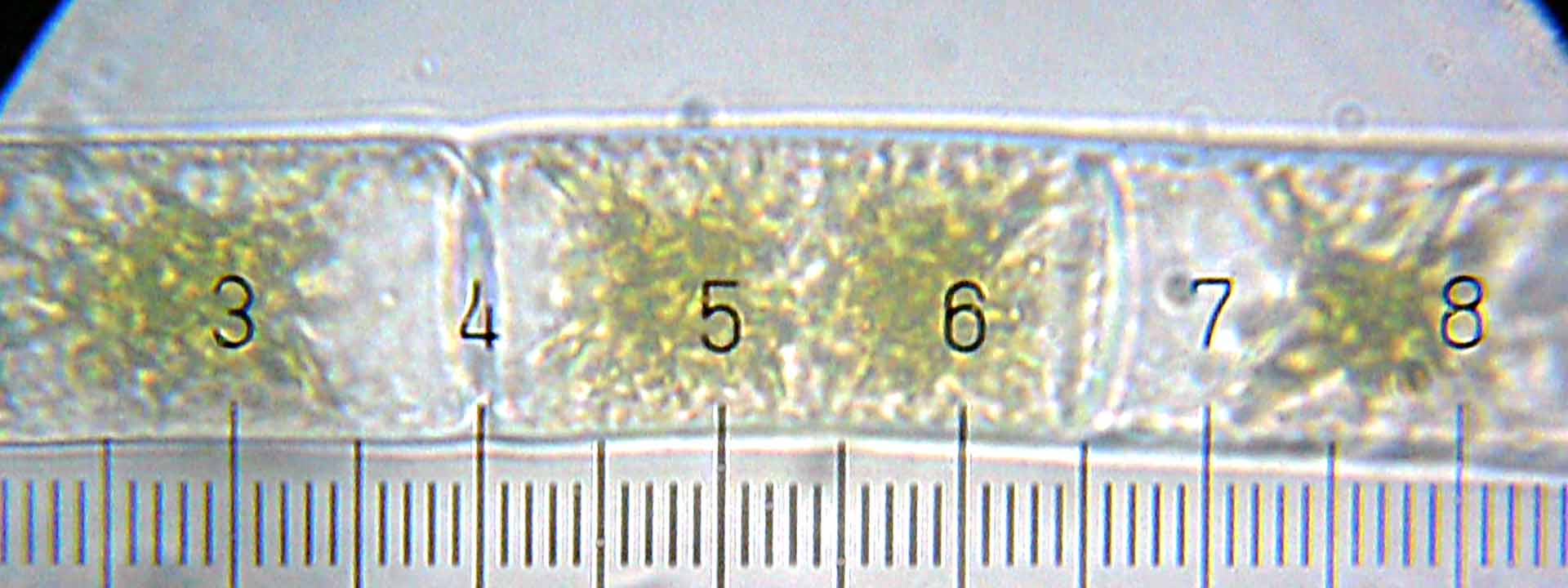
- Zygnema, showing characteristic dual star-shaped chloroplasts. Numbered ticks are 20 μm apart.
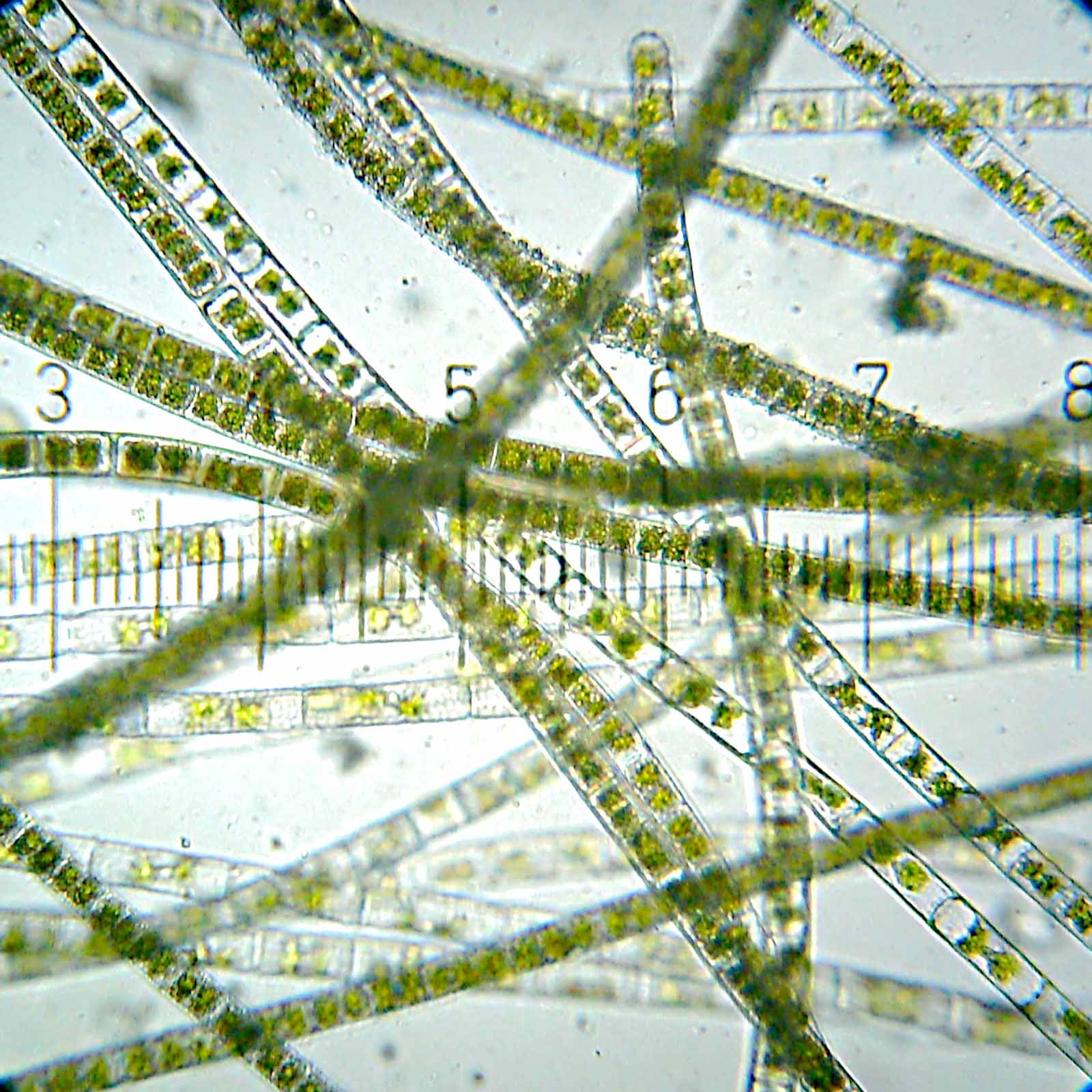
- Numbered ticks are 122 μm apart.

Scientific classification
- Kingdom: Plantae
- Class: Zygnematophyceae
- Order: Zygnematales
- Family: Zygnemataceae
- Genus: Zygnema; C. Agardh, 1817

Synonyms
- Globulina Link in Nees 1820; Lucernaria Roussel, 1806; Pleurodiscus Lagerheim, 1895; Rhynchonema Kützing, 1849; Stellulina Link, 1833; Thwaitesia Montagne, 1845; Tyndaridea Bory de Saint-Vincent 1822; Tendaridea Bory de Saint-Vincent 1822; Tendaridella Gaillon, 1833

= Zygnema =

Genus of algae

Zygnema is a genus of freshwater filamentous thalloid alga comprising about 100 species. A terrestrial species, Z. terrestre, is known from India. Zygnema grows as a free-floating mass of filaments, although young plants may be found anchored to streambeds with a holdfast. The filaments form a yellow-green to bright green colored tangled mat, and are composed of elongate barrel-shaped cells, each with two star-shaped (stellate) chloroplasts arrayed along the axis of the cell.

== Species ==
Some species include:

- Z. atrocoeruleum
- Z. binuclearioides
- Z. carinthiacum
- Z. carteri
- Z. circumcarinatum
- Z. coeruleum
- Z. conspicuum
- Z. cruciatum
- Z. cyanosphaeroidicum
- Z. cylindricum
- Z. cylindrospermum
- Z. fanicum
- Z. gorakhporense
- Z. insigne
- Z. kashmirense
- Z. kiangsiense
- Z. leiospermum
- Z. melanosporum
- Z. momoniense
- Z. normanii
- Z. oveidanum
- Z. pectinatum
- Z. peliosporum
- Z. quadrispirale
- Z. ralfsii
- Z. rivulare
- Z. ruviatum
- Z. schwabei
- Z. spontaneum
- Z. stagnale
- Z. stellinum
- Z. subtile
- Z. tenue
- Z. tenuissimum
- Z. terrestre
- Z. vaginatum
- Z. vaucherii
- Z. verrucosum
