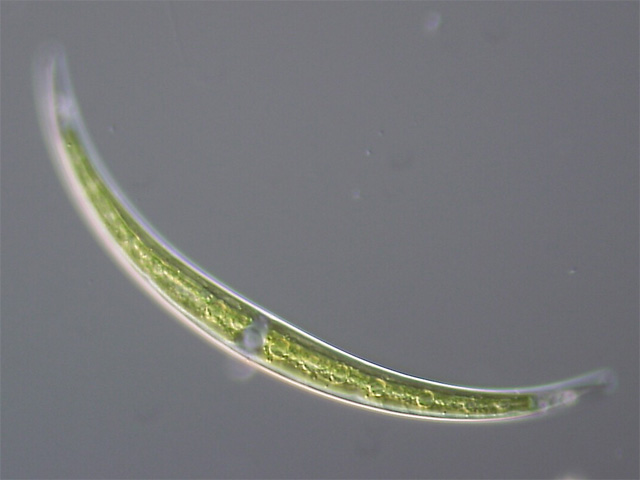
- Closterium sp.

Scientific classification
- Kingdom: Plantae
- Class: Zygnematophyceae
- Order: Desmidiales
- Family: Closteriaceae
- Genus: Closterium; Nitzsch ex Ralfs, 1848

Type species
- Closterium lunula Ehrenberg & Hemprich ex Ralfs

Species
- See text.

= Closterium =

Genus of algae

Closterium is a genus of desmid, a group of charophyte green algae. It is placed in the family Closteriaceae. Species of Closterium are a common component of freshwater microalgae flora worldwide.

== Description ==
Closterium is a diverse genus consisting of solitary cells, each made of two identical halves called semicells. Usually they are microscopic, but the largest can become easily visible to the naked eye. Cells are many times longer than broad, and are variously elongate to lunate (crescent-shaped). The poles are rounded, truncated, or pointed. The surface of the cell may be smooth or decorated with various features, such as striations or punctae. The cell wall is transparent, but with age it may become dark brown due to accumulated iron and manganese compounds. The cell nucleus is located in the middle of the cell. Each semicell contains a single axial chloroplast dotted with several pyrenoids.

At either end of the cell, there is a generally a polar vacuole. The vacuoles often contain conspicuous barium sulfate crystals.

== Taxonomy ==
Closterium regulare was first described from Lower Normandy by Brebisson. The name comes from the Greek word klosterion, meaning a small spindle.

=== Species ===
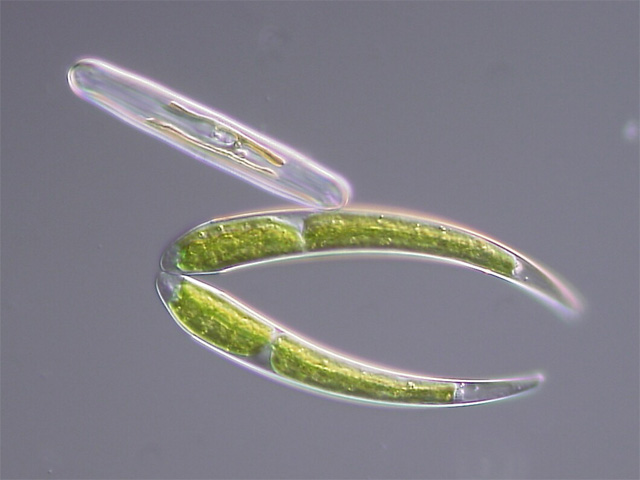
Closterium sp. during a mitotic phase (upper-left is a diatom)

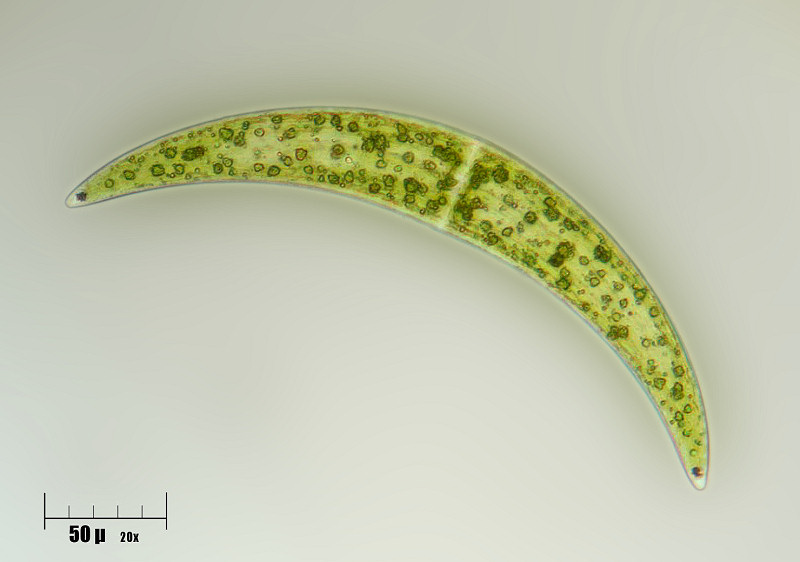
Closterium sp.

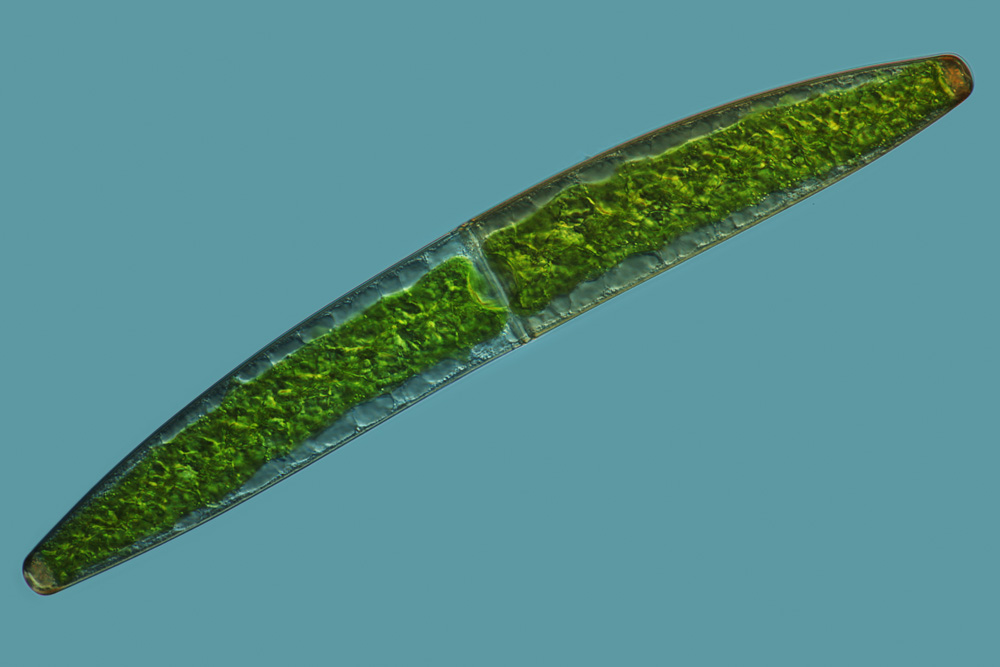
Closterium sp.

Closterium includes the following species (incomplete):

- C. abruptum
- C. acerosum
- C. aciculare
- C. acutum
- C. angustum
- C. archerianum
- C. baillyanum
- C. braunii
- C. calosporum
- C. closterioides
- C. cornu
- C. costatum
- C. delpontei
- C. dianae
- C. didymotocum
- C. directum
- C. ehrenbergii
- C. elongatum
- C. exile
- C. gracile
- C. idiosporum
- C. incurvum
- C. intermedium
- C. jenneri
- C. juncidum
- C. karnakense
- C. kuetzingii
- C. leibleinii
- C. limneticum
- C. lineatum
- C. littorale
- C. lunula
- C. moniliferum
- C. navicula
- C. nematodes
- C. parvulum
- C. peracerosum
- C. peracerosum-strigosum-littorale complex
- C. praelongum
- C. pritchardianum
- C. pronum
- C. pseudolunula
- C. pusillum
- C. ralfsii
- C. rectimarginatum
- C. rostratum
- C. selenaeum
- C. setaceum
- C. strigosum
- C. striolatum
- C. submoniliferum
- C. subulatum
- C. tumidulum
- C. tumidum
- C. turgidum
- C. venus
- C. wallichii

== Reproduction ==
Asexual: binary fission from a partitioned parent cell.

Sexual: Conjugation to form a hypnozygote.

The Closterium peracerosum-strigosum-littorale (C. psl) complex is a unicellular, isogamous charophycean alga cells that is the closest unicellular relative to land plants. These algae are capable of forming two types of dormant diploid zygospores. Some populations form zygospores within single clones of cells (homothallic), whereas others form zygospores between different clones of cells (heterothallic). The heterothallic strains have two mating types, mt(-) and mt(+). When cells of opposite mating types are mixed in a nitrogen-deficient mating medium, mt(-) and mt(+) cells pair with each other and release protoplasts. This release is then followed by protoplast fusion (conjugation) leading to formation of a diploid zygospore. Sex pheromones termed protoplast-release inducing proteins produced by mt(-) and mt(+) cells facilitate this process.

A homothallic strain of Closterium forms selfing zygospores via the conjugation of two sister gametangial cells derived from one vegetative cell. Conjugation in the homothallic strain occurs mainly at low cell density and is regulated by an ortholog of a heterothallic sex-specific pheromone.

Although self-fertilization employs meiosis, it produces minimal genetic variability. Homothallism is thus a form of sex that is unlikely to be adaptively maintained by a benefit related to producing variability. However, homothallic meiosis may be maintained in Closterium peracerosum as an adaptation for surviving under stressful conditions such as growth in nitrogen depleted media at low cell density. A proposed adaptive benefit of meiosis is the promotion of homologous recombinational repair of DNA damages that can be caused by a stressful environment

== Habitats ==
Like other desmids, Closterium is found in freshwater habitats. Closterium is usually attached to sediments or aquatic plants, but may sometimes be planktonic, i.e. free-floating in the water column, or found in wet soils. Most species prefer oligotrophic and slightly acidic waters, but a few species (for example Closterium aciculare) prefer eutrophic, slightly alkaline lakes.
