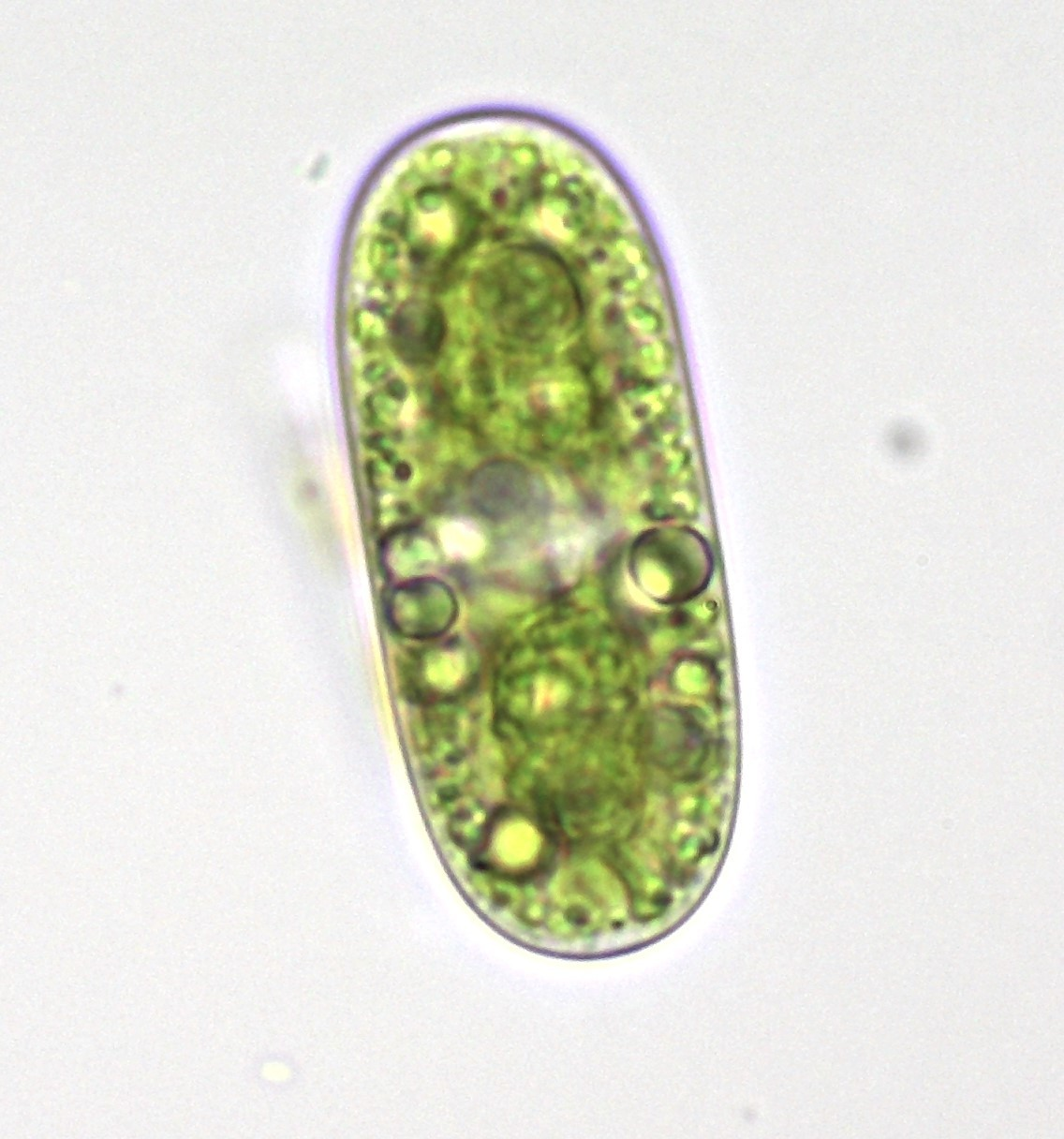
- Cylindrocystis brebissonii

Scientific classification
- Kingdom: Plantae
- Class: Zygnematophyceae
- Order: Zygnematales
- Family: Mesotaeniaceae; Oltmanns

Genera
- Ancylonema; Cylindrocystis; Geniculus; Mesotaenium; Netrium; Nucleotaenium; Planotaenium; Roya; Tortitaenia

= Mesotaeniaceae =

Family of algae

The Mesotaeniaceae are a small family of unicellular green algae known as the "saccoderm desmids". The Mesotaeniaceae appear to be sister or ancestral to the Zygnemataceae. The desmids are a deep branching group of Zygnemataceae. Spirotaenia was found to be a basal green alga.

== Genera ==
The Mesotaeniaceae includes the following genera:

- Ancylonema Berggren, 1872
- Cylindrocystis Meneghini ex De Bary, 1858
- Geniculus Prescott, 1967
- Mesotaenium Nägeli, 1849
- Netrium (Nägeli) Itzigsohn & Rothe, 1856
- Nucleotaenium Gontcharov & Melkonian, 2010
- Planotaenium (Ohtani) Petlovany & Palamar-Mordvintseva, 2009
- Roya West & G.S.West, 1896
- Tortitaenia A.J.Brook, 1998

Synonyms:

- Endospira Brébisson, nom. inval., is a synonym of Spirotaenia
- Entospira Kuntze, 1898 is a synonym of Spirotaenia
- Polytaenia A.J.Brook, 1997, nom. illeg., is a synonym of Tortitaenia
