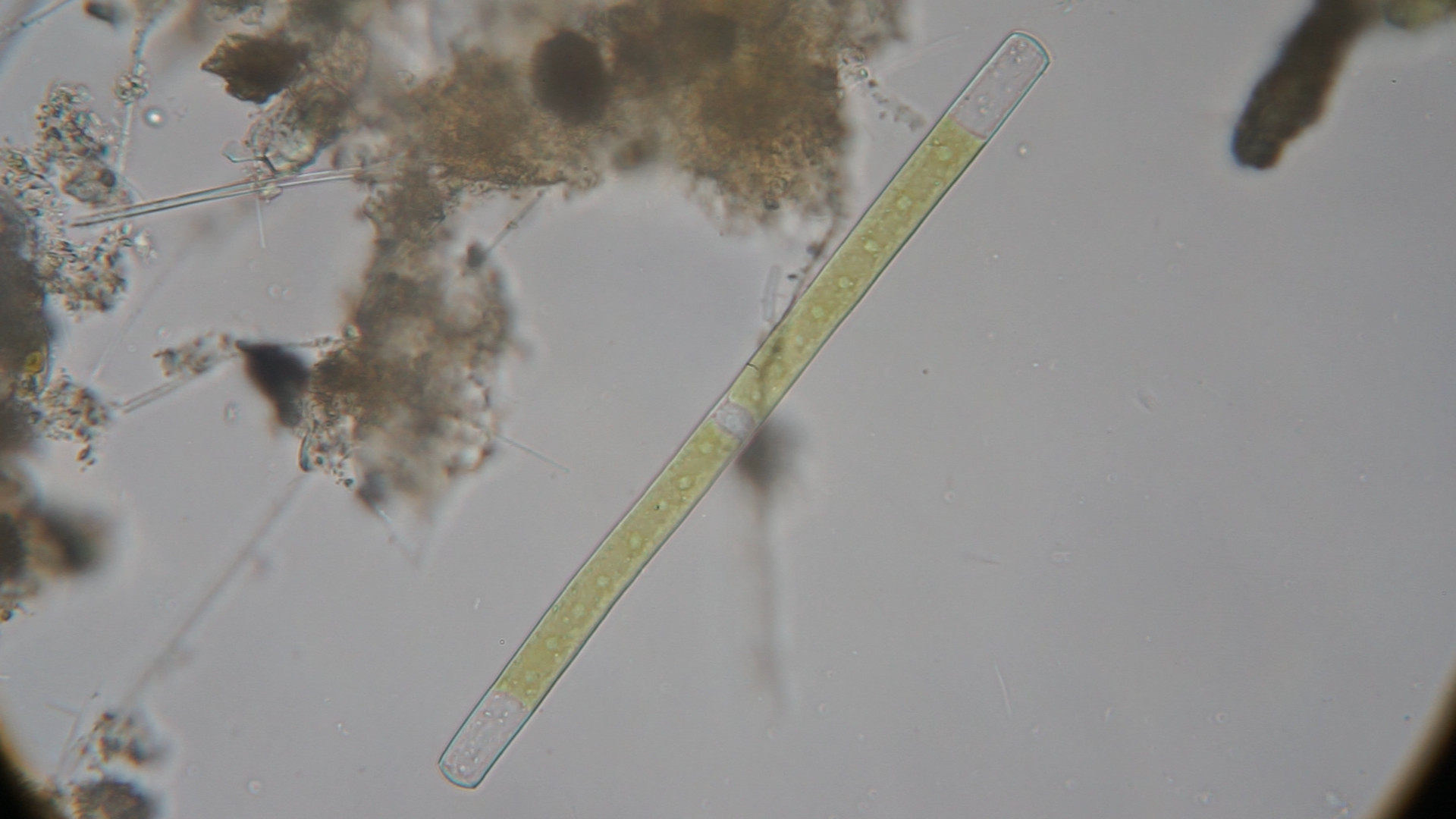
- Gonatozygon kinahani

Scientific classification
- Kingdom: Plantae
- Class: Zygnematophyceae
- Order: Desmidiales
- Family: Gonatozygaceae; G.S.West

Genera
- See text

= Gonatozygaceae =

Family of algae

The Gonatozygaceae are one of four families of Charophyte green algae in the order Desmidiales (desmids).

== Genera ==
As of February 2022, AlgaeBase accepted two genera:

- Genicularina Molinari & Guiry
- Gonatozygon De Bary (syn. Leptocystinema)

Genicularia is an illegitimate name for Genicularina.
