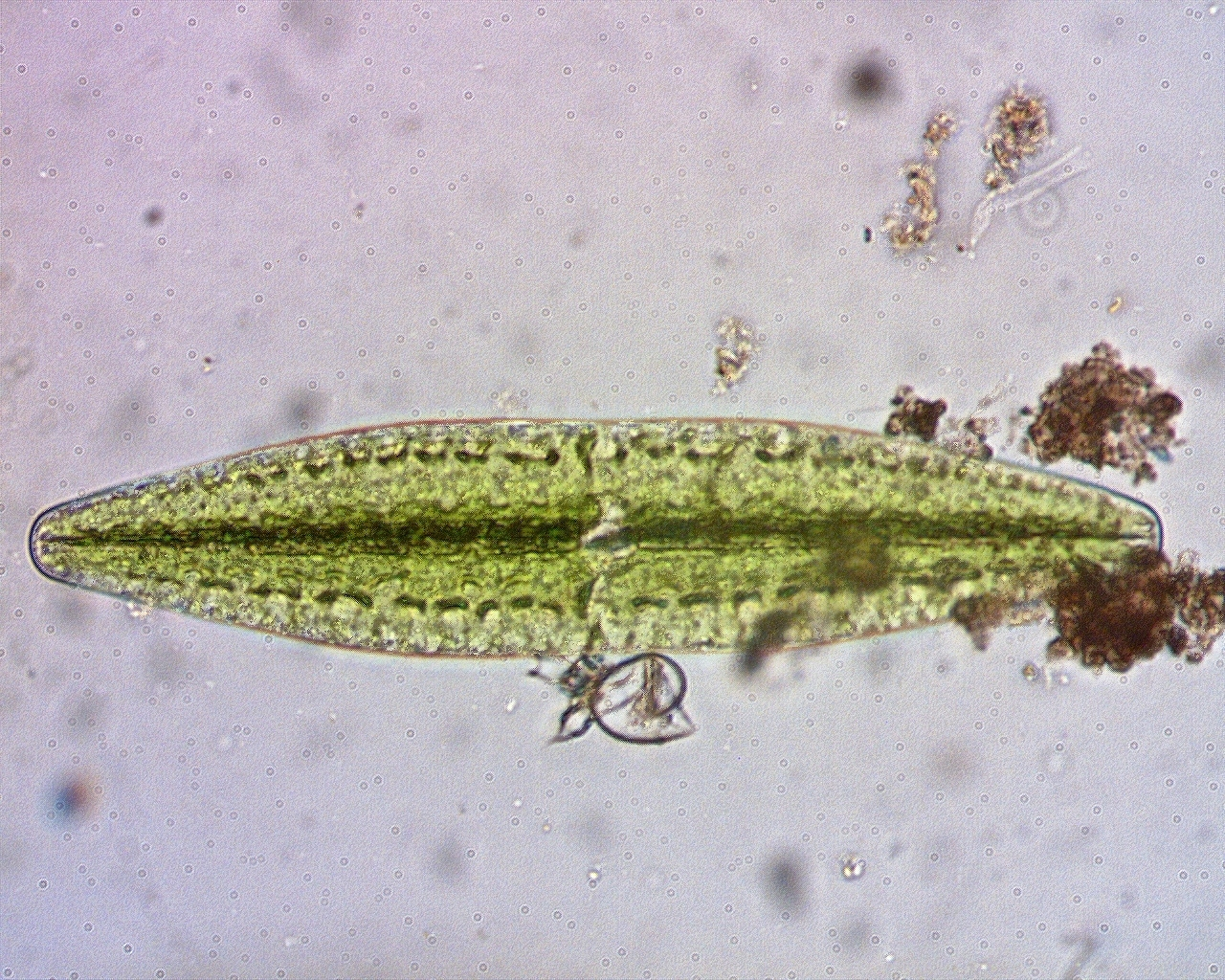
- Netrium digitus

Scientific classification
- Kingdom: Plantae
- Class: Zygnematophyceae
- Order: Zygnematales
- Family: Mesotaeniaceae
- Genus: Netrium (Nägeli) Itzigsohn & Rothe, 1856

= Netrium =

Genus of algae

Netrium is a genus of algae belonging to the family Mesotaeniaceae.

The species of this genus are found in Europe, America and Australia.

Species:

- Netrium digitus (Ehrenberg ex Ralfs) Itzigsohn & Rothe
- Netrium interruptum (Bréb.) Lütkem.
- Netrium lamellosum
- Netrium naegelii (Bréb. ex W.Archer) West
- Netrium obesus West & West
- Netrium oblongum (de Bary) Lütkem.
