= Mougeotiopsis =

Scientific classification
- Kingdom: Plantae
- Class: Zygnematophyceae
- Order: Serritaeniales
- Family: Serritaeniaceae
- Genus: Mougeotiopsis
- Species: M. calospora

Binomial name
- Mougeotiopsis calospora Palla, 1894

Synonyms
- Mesogerron F.Brand, 1899

Genus of algae

Mougeotiopsis is a monotypic genus of algae belonging to the family Serritaeniaceae. It only contains one known species, Mougeotiopsis calospora Palla

The genus name of Mougeotiopsis is in honour of Jean-Baptiste Mougeot (1776–1858), who was a French physician and botanist.

The genus was circumscribed by Eduard Palla in Ber. Deutsch. Bot. Ges. vol.12 n pages 228, 234-235 in 1894.
