= Mariana Pimentel =

Municipality of Rio Grande do Sul, Brazil

- Municipality
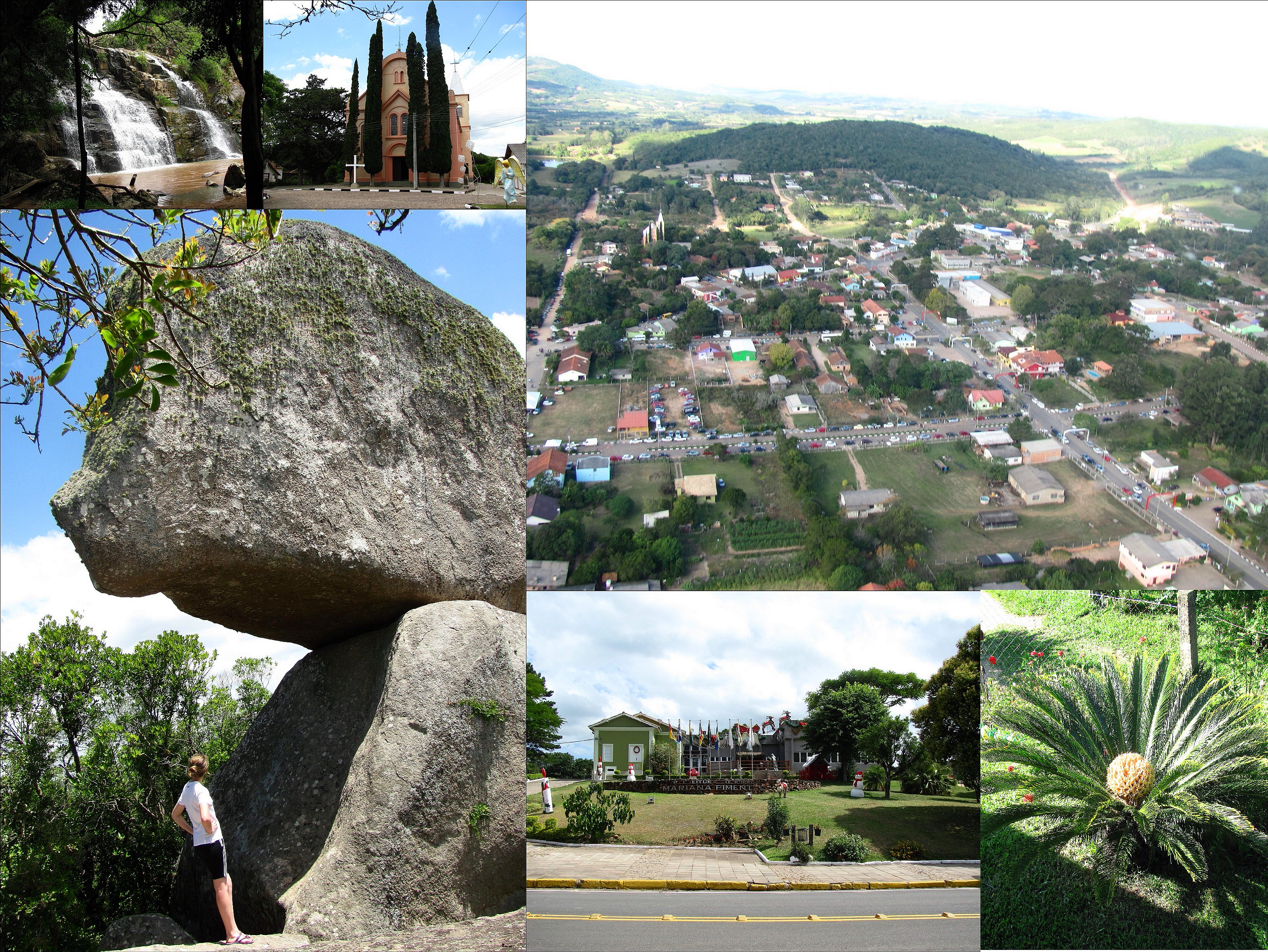

- Flag Coat of arms

- Location within Rio Grande do Sul

- Location in Brazil
- Coordinates: 30°20′S 51°35′W
- Country: Brazil
- State: Rio Grande do Sul

Population (2020)
  - Total: 3,888
- Time zone: UTC−3 (BRT)
- Website: www.marianapimentel.rs.gov.br

Mariana Pimentel is a municipality in the state of Rio Grande do Sul, Brazil. It is located approximately 75 km from the state's capital, Porto Alegre.

== Geography ==
Mariana Pimentel belongs to Porto Alegre Metropolitan Mesoregion and to Porto Alegre Microregion. The municipality can be accessed through RS-711, which is connected to BR-116.

The outcrop Morro do Papaléo within Mariana Pimentel was the discovery site of two species of the extinct algae Brazilea, dating back to the Sakmarian of the Permian.

== See also ==
- List of municipalities in Rio Grande do Sul
