= Purpurogallin =

- Chemical structure of purpurogallin

Names
- Preferred IUPAC name 1,7,8,9-Tetrahydroxy-2H-benzo[7]annulen-2-one
- Other names Purpurogalline; 2,3,4,6-Tetrahydroxybenzocyclohepten-5-one; PPG

Identifiers
| CAS Number | 569-77-7 |
| 3D model (JSmol) | Interactive image |
| ChEBI | CHEBI:8647 |
| ChemSpider | 4444893 |
| ECHA InfoCard | 100.008.478 |
| KEGG | C09964 |
| MeSH | C026133 |
| PubChem CID | 5281571 |
| UNII | L3Z7U4N28P |
| CompTox Dashboard (EPA) | DTXSID40205436 |
- InChI: InChI=1S/C11H8O5/c12-6-3-1-2-5-4-7(13)10(15)11(16)8(5)9(6)14/h1-4,13,15-16H,(H,12,14) Key: WDGFFVCWBZVLCE-UHFFFAOYSA-N
- SMILES: C1=CC(=O)C(=C2C(=C1)C=C(C(=C2O)O)O)O

Properties
| Chemical formula | C_{11}H_{8}O_{5} |
| Molar mass | 220.180 g·mol^{−1} |
| Appearance | Red crystalline solid |
- Except where otherwise noted, data are given for materials in their standard state (at 25 °C [77 °F], 100 kPa). verify (what is ?) Infobox references

Purpurogallin is an aglycone natural product. It is an orange-red solid that is soluble in polar organic solvents but not in water. Its glycoside (ether-linked to sugar), called dryophantin, is found in nutgalls and oak barks. Purpurogallin can be prepared by oxidation of pyrogallol with sodium periodate.

== Medicinal aspects ==
Purpurogallin is bioactive It can inhibit 2-hydroxy and 4-hydroxyestradiol methylation by catechol-O-methyltransferase. It potently and specifically inhibits TLR1/TLR2 activation pathway.

== Historical work ==
Purpurogallin, obtained by oxidation of pyrogallol, attracted attention for dyeing. Arthur George Perkin (son of William Henry Perkin, discoverer of the dye mauvine) reported early characterization including the formation of trimethyl ether and the triacetate.
