= Nestlera =

Scientific classification
- Kingdom: Plantae
- Clade: Tracheophytes
- Clade: Angiosperms
- Clade: Eudicots
- Clade: Asterids
- Order: Asterales
- Family: Asteraceae
- Subfamily: Asteroideae
- Tribe: Gnaphalieae
- Genus: Nestlera; Spreng. 1818 not Steud. 1841 (Poaceae)
- Species: N. biennis

Binomial name
- Nestlera biennis (Jacq.) Spreng.

Synonyms
- Columellea Jacq. 1798, illegitimate homonym not Lour. 1790 nor Ruiz et Pavon 1794; Stephanopappus Less.; Columellea biennis Jacq.; Relhania biennis (Jacq.) K.Bremer; Nestlera reflexa (Thunb.) DC.; Relhania reflexa Thunb.

Genus of flowering plants

Nestlera is a genus of South African flowering plants in the tribe Gnaphalieae within the family Asteraceae. The only accepted species is Nestlera biennis, native to the Cape Provinces of South Africa.
