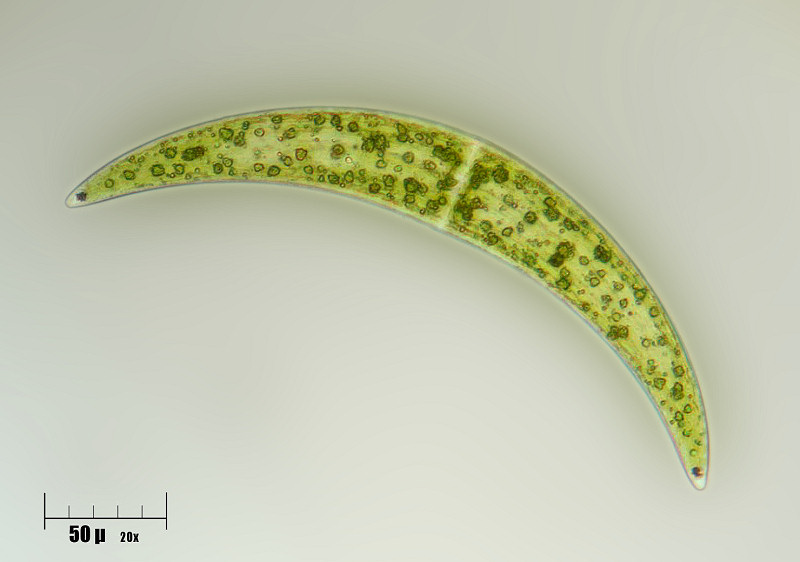
- Closterium sp.

Scientific classification
- Kingdom: Plantae
- Class: Zygnematophyceae
- Order: Desmidiales
- Family: Closteriaceae

Genera
- Closterium; Spinoclosterium

= Closteriaceae =

Family of algae

The Closteriaceae are one of four families of Charophyte green algae in the order Desmidiales (desmids). It contains two genera, Closterium and Spinoclosterium.

== Description ==
Closteriaceae consists of individual cells that are longer than wide. The cell shape ranges from straight to curved (lunate), with some species having cells curved only at the poles. The cell wall is hyaline or brownish in color, and may be covered with various ornamentation such as grooves, ribs, scores, and polar thickenings. Cells contain axial chloroplasts with several pyrenoids.
