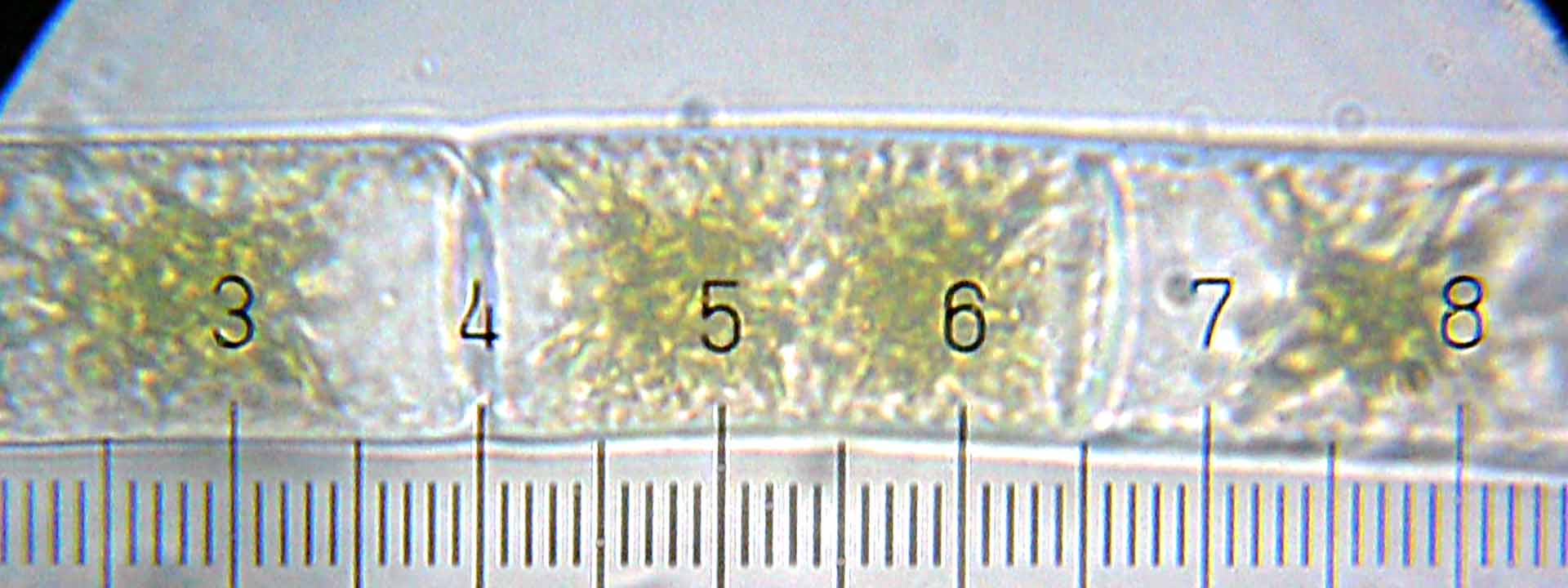
- Zygnema fliament

Scientific classification
- Domain: Eukaryota
- Clade: Archaeplastida
- Clade: Viridiplantae
- Division: Charophyta
- Class: Zygnematophyceae
- Order: Zygnematales; C.E.Bessey, 1907

Families
- Zygnemataceae; Mesotaeniaceae

= Zygnematales =

Order of algae

The Zygnematales (Greek: ζυγός (zygós) and νῆμα (nḗma) (nom.), νήματος (nḗmatos) (gen.)), also called the Conjugatales, are an order of green algae, comprising several thousand different species in two families. The larger family Zygnemataceae, with well-known genera such as Zygnema and Spirogyra, includes members that grow as unbranched filaments, which grow longer through normal cell division. This group includes the desmids. Most members of both families live in freshwater, and form an important component of the algal scum that grows on or near plants and rocks.

Systematically they fall within the division Charophyta/Streptophyta, in which the land plants (Embryophyta) emerged.

Sexual reproduction in Zygnematales takes place through a process called conjugation. Here filaments of opposite gender line up, and tubes form between corresponding cells. The male cells then become amoeboid and crawl across, or sometimes both cells crawl into the tube. The cells then meet and fuse to form a zygote, which later undergoes meiosis to produce new filaments. As in plants, only the female passes chloroplasts on to the offspring.

Other conjugating algae are the Mesotaeniaceae, sister of the Zygnematales, and Spirotaenia, a basal green algae. Additionally, the Desmidiales appear to have emerged deep within the Zygnematales, and are also conjugating.

== Gallery ==
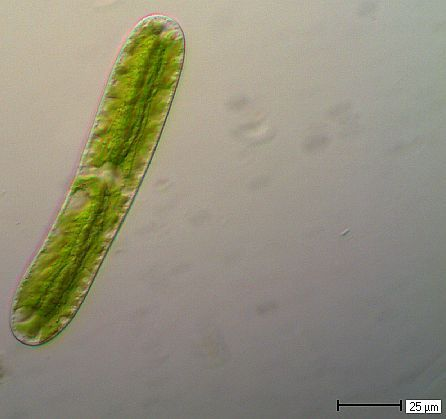
Netrium oblongum. A saccoderm "desmid"

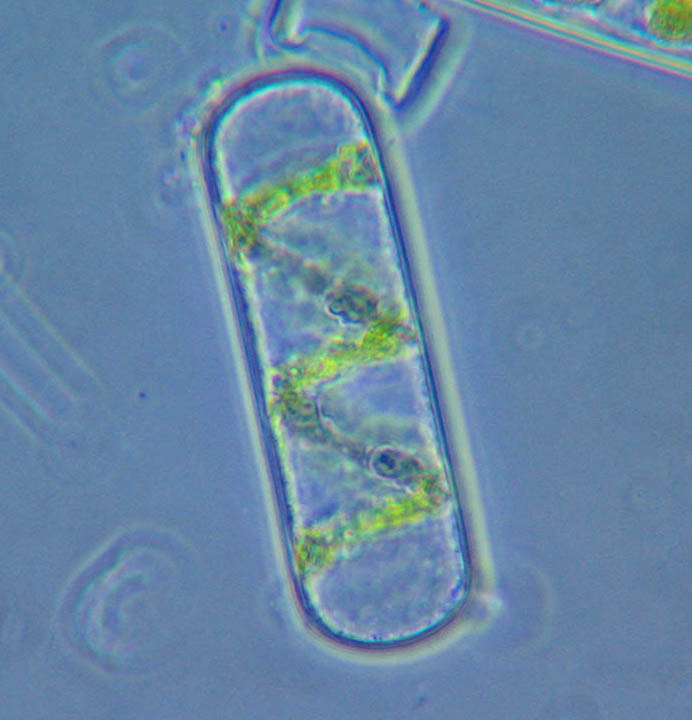
Single Spirogyra cell

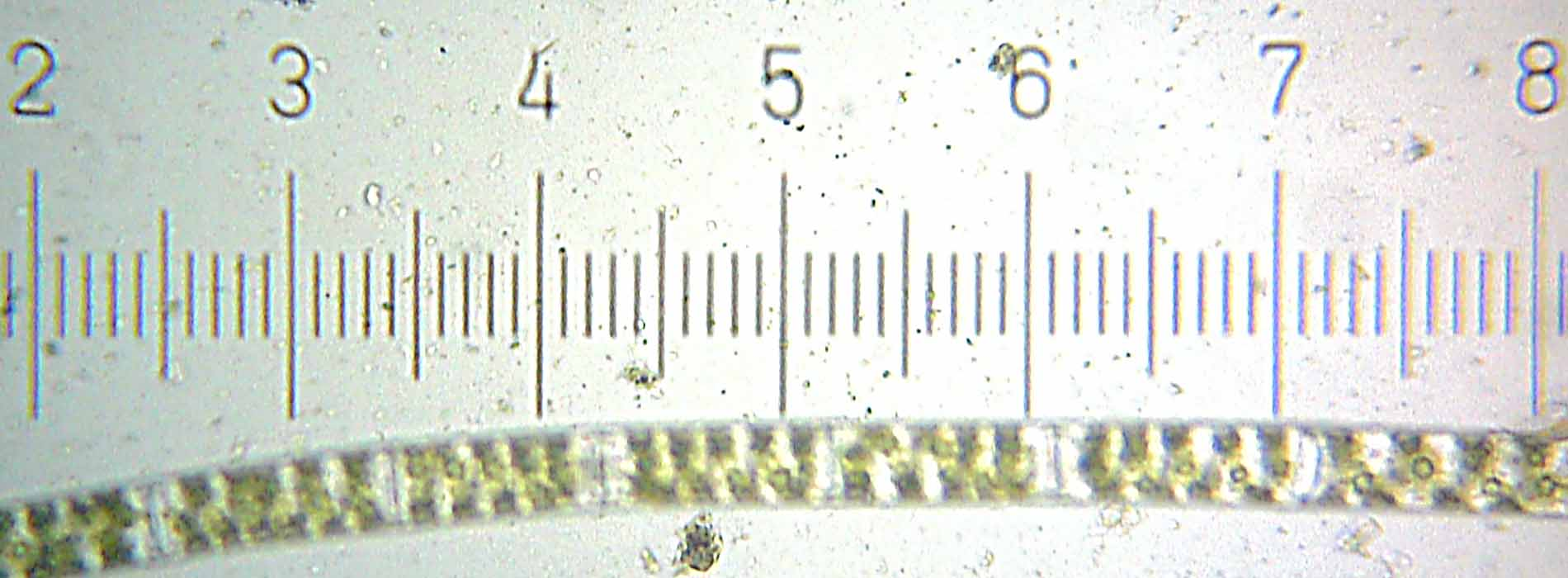
Spirogyra. Each numbered tick = 122 μM

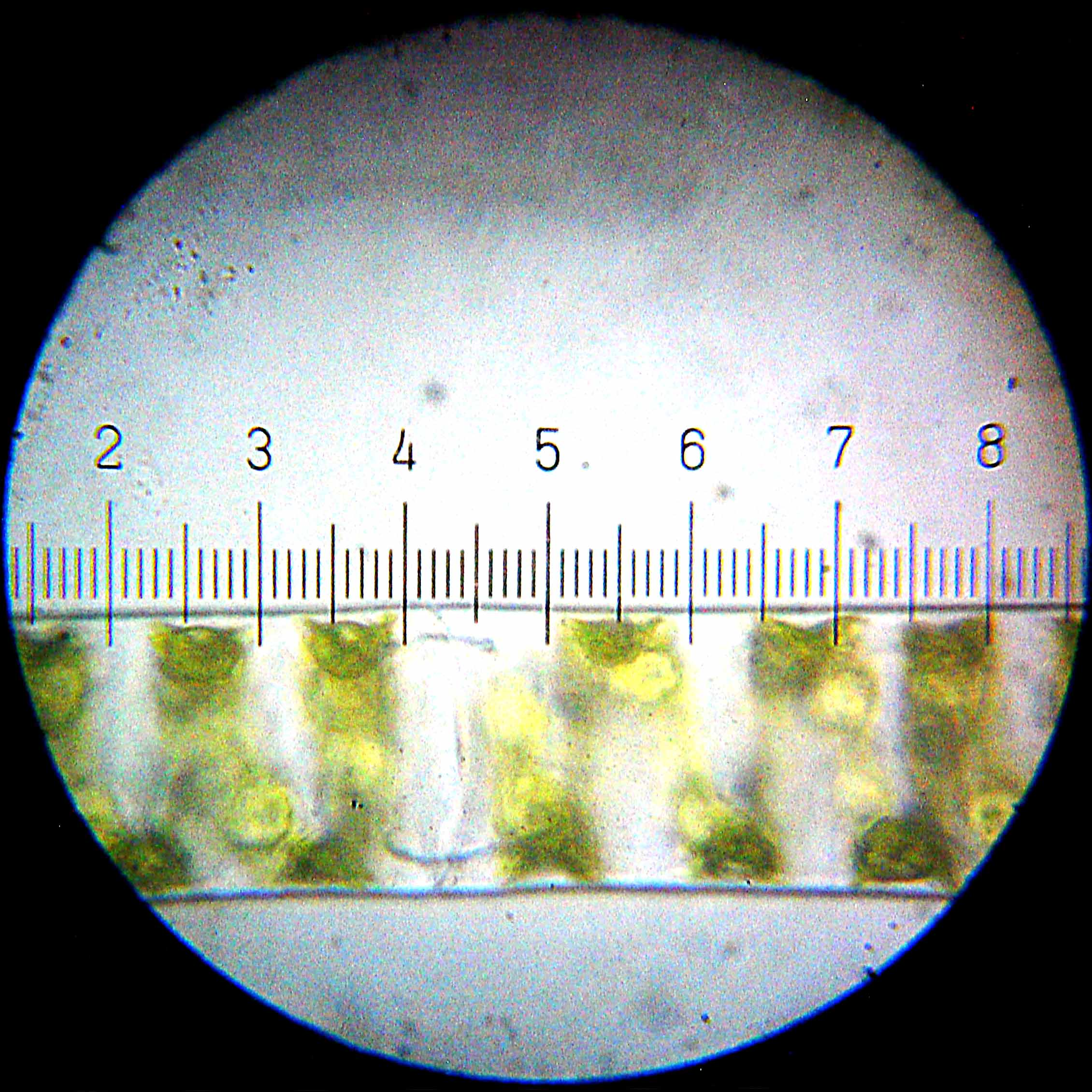
Spirogyra. Each numbered tick = 20 μM

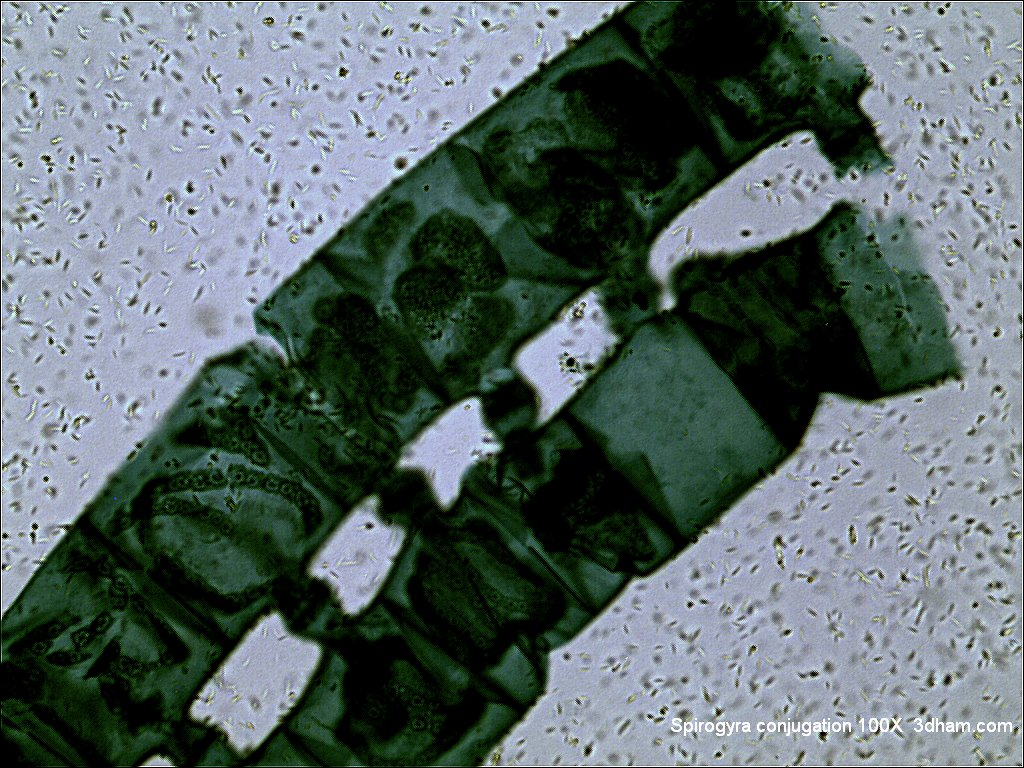
Microscopic view of Spirogyra conjugation

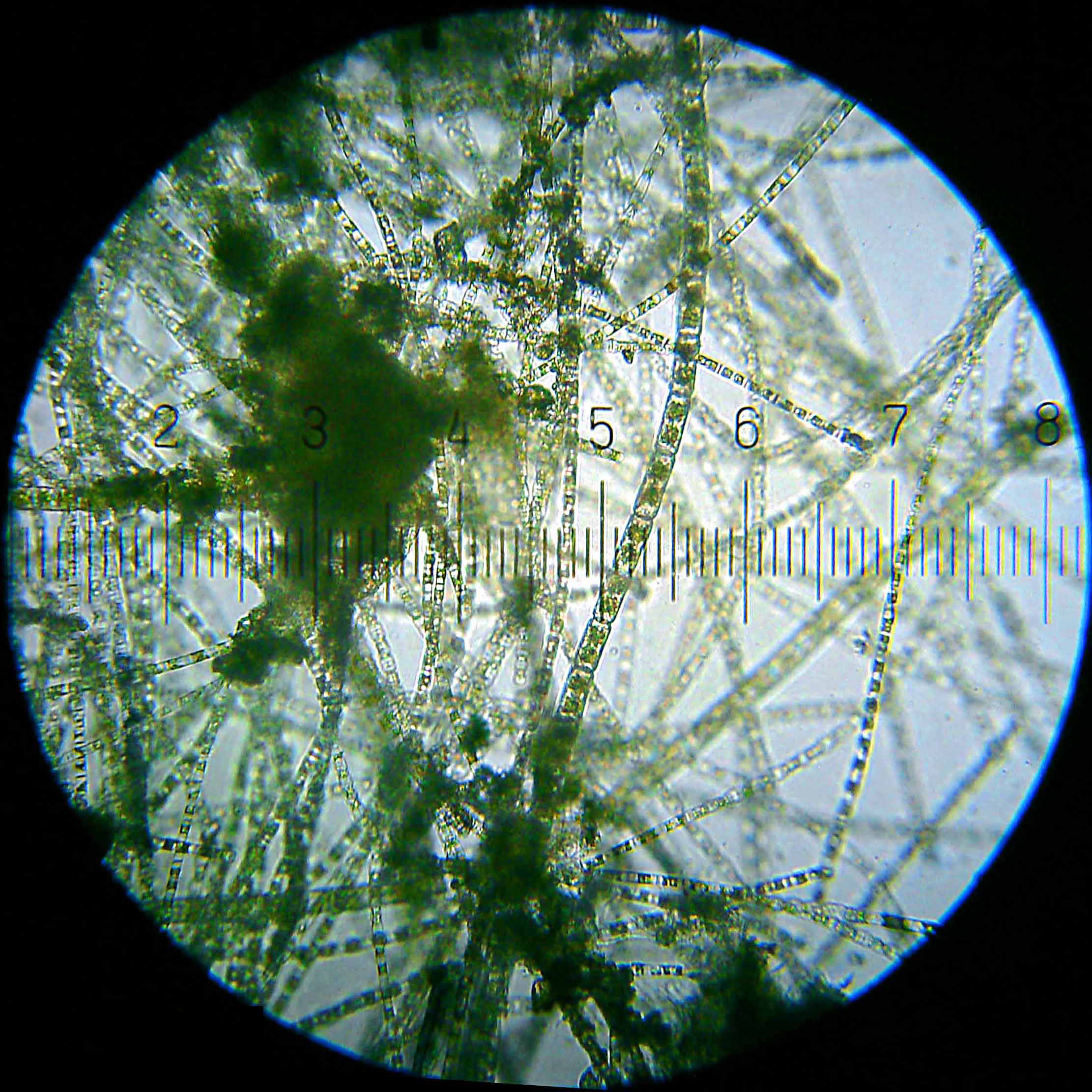
Zygnema. Each numbered tick = 122 μM

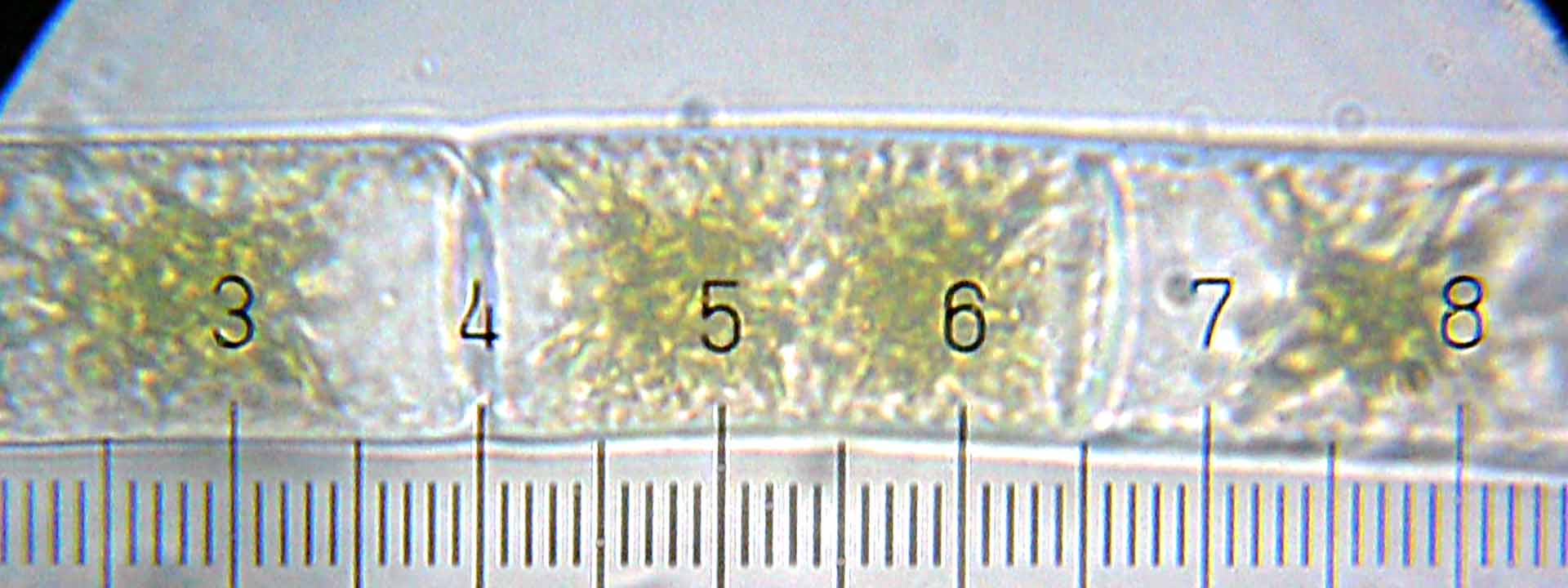
Zygnema. Each numbered tick = 20 μM
