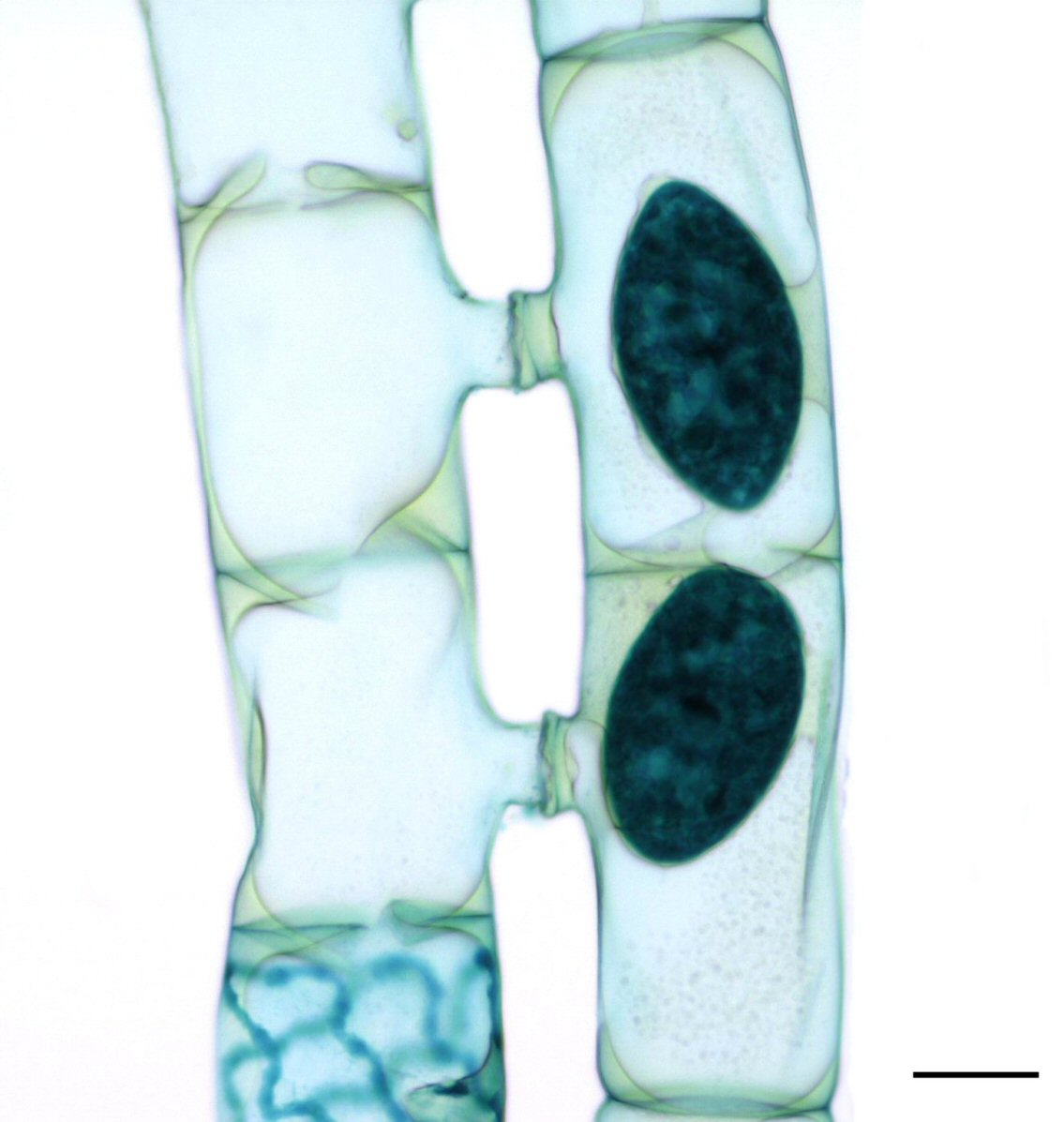
- Conjugation in Spirogyra.

Scientific classification
- Kingdom: Plantae
- Clade: Phragmoplastophyta
- Class: Zygnematophyceae; Round, 1971

Subclasses
- Subclass Zygnematophycidae; Order Zygnematales; Order Desmidiales; Order Spirogyrales; Order Serritaeniales; Subclass Spirogloeophycidae; Order Spirogloeales

Synonyms
- Akontae Blackman & Tansley, 1902; Conjugatophyceae Engler, 1892; 'Conjugatae' Engler, 1892; Gamophyceae; Saccodermae Pascher ex Kossinskaja, 1952; Zygnemaphyceae Round 1971; Zygophyceae Widder, 1960

= Zygnematophyceae =

Class of algae

Zygnematophyceae (or Conjugatophyceae) is a class of green algae in the paraphylum streptophyte algae, also referred to as Charophyta, consisting of more than 4000 described species. The Zygnematophyceae are the sister clade of the Embryophyta (land plants).

Common members of the Zygnematophyceae include the filamentous algae Spirogyra and Mougeotia, as well as desmids, which are microscopic algae characterized by symmetrical and elaborately ornate cells.

== Morphology ==
The body plan of Zygnematophyceae is simple, and the group appears to have gone through a secondary loss of morphological complexity. The most basal members are unicellular, but filamentous species have evolved at least five times, and a few species form colonies. Each cell contains a single nucleus.

The chloroplasts of the Zygnematophyceae are large, typically axile but sometimes parietally located, and contain one or several pyrenoids. One or several chloroplasts may be present in a single cell. The shape of the chloroplast may be star-shaped (in Zygnema), ribbon-shaped (in Spirogyra), or elaborately lobed and dissected. In some taxa, particularly Mougeotia, the chloroplast is able to move in response to different light conditions.

In the Zygnematophyceae, which share all the major enzymes for cell wall synthesis and remodifications with land plants, cell walls are composed of three layers: one outer layer consisting of mucus, a primary wall consisting of microfibrils, and an innermost layer of cellulosic microfibrils. Some species shed their primary wall and retain only the innermost layer. The cell wall may be variously decorated with striations, granules, or spines. In the Desmidiales, there are pores in the cell wall which allow the cell to extrude a layer of mucilage for protection.

Several Zygnematophyceae contain genes involved in protection from desiccation that appear to have been derived by horizontal gene transfer from bacteria; the genes are found in plants, Zygnematophyceae, and bacteria, but no other organisms. The genes may have helped to enable plants to make the transition to life on land.

A new subclass called Spirogloeophycidae, represented by the species Spirogloea muscicola, was established after the unicellular subaerial algae, resembling a "gelatinous blob", was rediscovered on a rock close to a river bank near Cologne in 2006, after first being discovered in France in 1845.

== Reproduction ==
The Zygnematophyceae are able to reproduce both asexually and sexually. Asexual reproduction takes place via fragmentation, cell division, akinete formation, or parthenospores.

Sexual reproduction in the Zygnematophyceae takes place through a process called conjugation. Unusually, the gametes lack flagella, and they also lack centrioles which suggest that flagella were not secondarily lost. This lack of flagella sets the Zygnematophyceae apart from nearly all groups of algae, except for red algae and cyanobacteria (also known as blue-green algae, if they are classified as such). The gametes are scarcely differentiated from vegetative cells.

In conjugation, cells or filaments of opposite sex line up, and tubes form between corresponding cells. The male cells then become amoeboid and crawl across the female, or sometimes both cells crawl into the connecting tube. The cells then meet and fuse to form a zygote, which later undergoes meiosis to produce new cells or filaments. As in land plants, only the female passes its chloroplasts on to the offspring.

== Taxonomy ==
The Zygnematophyceae is monophyletic. Traditionally, it has been known to contain two orders, the Zygnematales and Desmidiales. However, the Zygnematales were found to be paraphyletic with respect to the Desmidiales, and so it was split up. As of 2023, five orders and two subclasses are recognized: the Spirogloeales in Spirogloeophycidae, and the Serritaeniales, the Zygnematales, the Spirogyrales, and the Desmidiales in Zygnematophycidae.

Class Zygnematophyceae

- Subclass Spirogloeophycidae Melkonian, Gontcharov & Marin 2019
  - Order Spirogloeales Melkonian, Gontcharov & Marin 2019
    - Family Spirogloeaceae Melkonian, Gontcharov & Marin 2019
- Subclass Zygnematophycidae Melkonian, Gontcharov & Marin 2019
  - Order Serritaeniales Hess & de Vries 2022
    - Family Serritaeniaceae Hess & de Vries 2022
  - Order Zygnematales Borge & Pascher 1931
    - Family Zygnemataceae (Meneghini) Kützing 1843
    - Family Mesotaeniaceae Oltmans 1904 (paraphyletic)
  - Order Spirogyrales Hess & de Vries 2022
    - Family Spirogyraceae Palla 1894
  - Order Desmidiales Krieger 1933
    - Family Gonatozygaceae Fritsch 1927
    - Family Closteriaceae Bessey 1907 ex Pritchard 1852
    - Family Peniaceae Haeckel 1894
    - Family Desmidiaceae Kützing 1833b ex Ralfs 1845

=== Phylogeny ===
A phylogeny of the families of Zygnematophyceae is presented below:

- Zygnematophyceae
  - Spirogloeophycidae
    - Spirogloeales
      Spirogloeaceae
  - Zygnematophycidae
    - Serritaeniales
      Serritaeniaceae
    - - Zygnematales
        - Zygnemataceae
        - Mesotaeniaceae
      - - Spirogyrales
          Spirogyraceae
        - Desmidiales
          - Gonatozygaceae
          - - Closteriaceae
            - - Peniaceae
              - Desmidiaceae

== Habitat ==
Members of the Zygnematophyceae are common in nearly all freshwater habitats, particularly filamentous genera such as Spirogyra and Mougeotia. Some Spirogyra species can tolerate disturbed habitats. On the other hand, desmids (the Desmidiales) often prefer bogs, peatlands, and lakes.

== Fossil record ==
Vegetative cells of the Zygnematophyceae are fragile and usually not preserved, but the zygospores are resistant to decay and can become fossilized. The Zygnematophyceae have been recorded from at least the middle Devonian period, and before the Carboniferous period, all the major groups had diverged. Fossils of zygospores are indicators of warming spring conditions and shallow, stagnant mesotrophic habitats.

== Genomes ==
The first genomes published for Zygnematophyceae were Mesotaenium endlicherianum and Spirogloea muscicola. Since then, genomes have been published on Penium margaritaceum, Zygnema spp., and the Closterium peracerosum–strigosum–littorale complex. Furthermore, the gene models of Mesotaenium endlicherianum have been updated.
