= Hoek, Mann and Jahns system =

System of taxonomy of algae

The Hoek, Mann and Jahns system is a system of taxonomy of algae. It was first published in Algae: An Introduction to Phycology by Cambridge University Press in 1995.

== Division Cyanophyta (= Cyanobacteria) ==
- Class Cyanophyceae

- Order Chroococcales (e.g., Cyanothece, Aphanothece, Merismopedia, Chroococcus, Gloeocapsa, Microcystis, Chamaesiphon)
- Order Pleurocapsales (e.g., Cyanocystis, Pleurocapsa)
- Order Oscillatoriales (e.g., Oscillatoria, Lyngbya, Microcoleus)
- Order Nostocales (e.g., Nostoc, Anabaena, Aphanizomenon, Scytonema, Rivularia)
- Order Stigonematales (e.g., Stigonema)

== Division Prochlorophyta ==
- Class Prochlorophyceae (e.g., Prochloron, Prochlorococcus, Prochlorothrix)

== Division Glaucophyta ==
- Class Glaucophyceae (e.g., Cyanophora, Glaucocystis)

== Division Rhodophyta ==
- Class Bangiophyceae

- Order Porphyridiales (e.g., Porphyridium, Chroodactylon)
- Order Rhodochaetales (e.g., Rhodochaete)
- Order Erythropeltidales (e.g., Erythrotrichia)
- Order Compsogonales
- Order Bangiales (e.g., Porphyra, Bangia)

- Class Florideophyceae

- Order Acrochaetiales (e.g., Audouinella)
- Order Palmariales (e.g., Palmaria, Rhodophysema)
- Order Nemaliales (e.g., Nemalion, Galaxaura)
- Order Batrachospermales (e.g., Lemanea, Batrachospermum)
- Order Corallinales (e.g., Lithophyllum, Jania)
- Order Hildebrandiales
- Order Bonnemaisoniales
- Order Gelidiales (e.g., Gelidium)
- Order Gigartinales (e.g., Acrosymphyton, Dumontia, Chondrus, Mastocarpus)
- Order Gracilariales
- Order Ahnfeltiales
- Order Rhodymeniales (e.g., Chylocladia)
- Order Ceramiales (e.g., Polysiphonia, Callithamnion, Ceramium, Hypoglossum)

== Division Heterokontophyta ==
- Class Chrysophyceae

- Order Ochromonadales (e.g., Ochromonas, Pseudokephyrion, Dinobryon)
- Order Mallomonadales (= Class Synurophyceae, e.g., Mallomonas, Synura)
- Order Pedinellales (= Class Pedinellophyceae, e.g., Pedinella)
- Order Chrysamoebidales (e.g., Rhizochrysis, Chrysarachnion)
- Order Chrysocapsales (e.g., Chrysocapsa, Hydrurus)
- Order Chrysosphaerales (e.g., Chrysosphaera)
- Order Phaeothamniales (e.g., Phaeothamnion, Thallochrysis)

- Class Parmophyceae

- Order Parmales (e.g., Pentalamina)

- Class Sarcinochrysidophyceae

- Order Sarcinochrysidales (e.g., Ankylochrysis, Sarcinochrysis, Nematochrysis)

- Genus Pelagococcus (relative of the Chrysophyceae)
- Class Xanthophyceae

- Order Chloramoebales (e.g., Chloromeson)
- Order Rhizochloridales (e.g., Rhizochloris, Myxochloris)
- Order Heterogloeales (e.g., Gloeochloris)
- Order Mischococcales (e.g., Chloridella, Botrydiopsis, Characiopsis, Ophiocytium)
- Order Tribonematales (e.g., Tribonema, Heterococcus, Heterodendron)
- Order Botrydiales (e.g., Botrydium)
- Order Vaucheriales (e.g., Vaucheria)

- Class Eustigmatophyceae (e.g., Ellipsoidion, Eustigmatos [= Pleurochloris], Polyedriella, Vischeria, Chlorobotrys, Nannochloropsis)
- Class Bacillariophyceae (= Diatomophyceae)

- Order Pennales (e.g., Navicula, Gyrosigma, Achnanthes, Tabellaria, Nitzschia, Surirella)
- Order Centrales (e.g., Coscinodiscus, Thalassiosira, Stephanodiscus, Cerataulus, Triceratium, Odontella, Rhizosolenia)

- Class Raphidophyceae (e.g., Chatonella, Gonyostomum, Merotrichia, Vacuolaria, Fibrocapsa)
- Class Dictyochophyceae (e.g., Dictyocha)
- Class Phaeophyceae

- Order Ectocarpales (e.g., Phaeostroma, Spongonema, Ectocarpus)
- Order Sphacelariales (e.g., Sphacelaria)
- Order Syringodermatales
- Order Dictyotales (e.g., Dictyota)
- Order Scytosiphonales (e.g., Scytosiphon)
- Order Cutleriales (e.g., Cutleria)
- Order Dictyosiphonales (e.g., Dictyosiphon)
- Order Chordariales (e.g., Sphaerotrichia, Liebmania, Elachista)
- Order Sporochnales
- Order Desmarestiales (e.g., Desmarestia)
- Order Laminariales (e.g., Laminaria, Chorda)
- Order Fucales (e.g., Fucus, Hormosira)
- Order Durvillaeales (e.g., Durvillaea)
- Order Ascoseirales

- Class Bicocoecida (e.g., Pseudobodo, Cafeteria)
- Class Oomycetes (e.g., Phytophthora)
- Class Hyphochytridiomycetes
- Class Labyrinthulomycetes

== Division Haptophyta (= Prymnesiophyta) ==
- Class Haptophyceae

- Order Prymnesiales (e.g., Chrysochromulina, Prymnesium, Corymbellus, Phaeocystis)
- Order Isochrysidales (e.g., Chrysotila, Pleurochrysis [= Hymenomonas])
- Order Coccolithophorales (e.g., Emiliania, Syracosphaera, Discosphaera)
- Order Pavlovales (e.g., Pavlova)

== Division Cryptophyta ==
- Class Cryptophyceae (e.g., Cryptomonas, Chilomonas, Bjornbergiella)

== Division Dinophyta ==
- Class Dinophyceae

- Order Gymnodiniales (e.g., Gymnodinium, Symbiodinium, Polykrikos)
- Order Gloeodiniales (e.g., Gloeodinium)
- Order Thoracosphaerales (e.g., Thoracosphaera)
- Order Phytodiniales (= Dinococcales, e.g., Phytodinium)
- Order Dinotrichales (e.g., Dinoclonium)
- Order Dinamoebidales (e.g., Stylodinium, Dinamoebidium)
- Order Noctilucales (e.g., Noctiluca)
- Order Blastodiniales (e.g., Blastodinium)
- Order Syndiniales
- Order Peridiniales (e.g., Peridinium, Protoperidinium, Ceratium, Gonyaulax)
- Order Dynophysiales (e.g., Dinophysis, Triposolenia, Amphisolenia, Ornithocercus, Histioneis)
- Order Prorocentrales (e.g., Prorocentrum)

== Division Euglenophyta ==
- Class Euglenophyceae

- Order Euglenales (e.g., Euglena, Astasia)
- Order Eutreptiales
- Order Euglenamorphales
- Order Rhabdomonadales
- Order Sphenomonadales
- Order Heteronematales

== Division Chlorarachniophyta ==
- Class Chlorarachniophyceae (e.g., Chlorarachnion)

== Division Chlorophyta ==
- Class Prasinophyceae

- Order Mamiellales (e.g., Mamiella, Bathycoccus)
- Order Pseudoscourfieldiales (e.g., Nephroselmis)
- Order Pyramimonadales (e.g., Pyramimonas, Halosphaera, Pachysphaera [?], Pterosperma [?], Mesostigma [?])
- Genus Pedinomonas (sometimes classified in the class Pedinophyceae, or Loxophyceae)
- Order Chlorodendrales (e.g., Tetraselmis)

- Class Chlorophyceae

- Order Volvocales [including the Tetrasporales] (e.g., Chlamydomonas, Chlorogonium, Hyalogonium, Gloeomonas, Diplostauron, Polytoma, Carteria, Brachiomonas, Lobomonas, Sphaerellopsis, Haematococcus, Phacotus, Pteromonas, Stephanosphaera, Gonium, Pandorina, Eudorina, Volvox, Pseudosphaerocystis)
- Order Chlorococcales (e.g., Chlorococcum, Golenkinia, Chlorella, Chodatella, Oocystis, Kirchneriella, Nephrocytium, Actinastrum, Crucigenia, Sphaerocystis, Coccomyxa, Scenedesmus, Hydrodictyon, Pediastrum, Chlorosarcinopsis, Cylindrocapsa, Geminella, Binuclearia, Radiofilum, Sphaeroplea, Characiosiphon, Atractomorpha)
- Order Chaetophorales (e.g., Uronema, Stigeoclonium, Draparnaldia, Schizomeris)
- Order Oedogoniales (e.g., Oedogonium)

- Class Ulvophyceae

- Order Codiolales (e.g., Chlorocystis, Ulothrix, Spongomorpha, Urospora, Acrosiphonia, Monostroma)
- Order Ulvales (e.g., Ulva, Enteromorpha, Ulvaria, Acrochaete)

- Class Cladophorophyceae

- Order Cladophorales (e.g., Cladophora, Chaetomorpha, Rhizoclonium, Struvea, Valonia, Siphonocladus, Dictyosphaeria)

- Class Bryopsidophyceae

- Order Bryopsidales (e.g., Bryopsis, Pseudobryopsis, Derbesia, Codium)
- Order Halimedales (e.g., Udotea, Penicillus, Halimeda, Caulerpa)

- Class Dasycladophyceae

- Order Dasycladales (e.g., Acetabularia, Batophora, Dasycladus, Neomeris, Cymopolia)

- Class Trentepohliophyceae

- Order Trentepohliales (e.g., Trentepohlia, Cephaleuros)

- Class Pleurastrophyceae

- Order Pleurastrales (e.g., Trebouxia, Myrmecia, Friedmannia, Pleurastrosarcina, Pleurastrum, Microthamnion)

- Position uncertain:

- Order Prasiolales (e.g., Prasiola)

- Class Klebsormidiophyceae

- Order Klebsormidiales (e.g., Chlorokybus, Raphidonema, Klebsormidium)
- Order Coleochaetales (e.g., Chaetosphaeridium, Coleochaete)

- Class Zygnematophyceae

- Order Zygnematales (e.g., Spirogyra, Mougeotia, Zygnema, Spirotaenia, Cylindrocystis, Netrium)
- Order Desmidiales (e.g., Cosmarium, Gonatozygon, Closterium, Pleurotaenium, Tetmemorus, Euastrum, Micrasterias, Cosmocladium, Xanthidium, Staurastrum, Desmidium, Hyalotheca, Spondylosium, Sphaerozosma, Onychonema)

- Class Charophyceae

- Order Charales (e.g., Chara, Lamprothamnium, Nitellopsis, Nitella, Tolypella)

=== Note added in proof ===
In a note added in proof, an alternative classification is presented for the class Chlorophyceae:

- Class Chlamydophyceae

- Order Volvocales
- Order Chaetophorales
- Order Chlorococcales (e.g., Chlorococcum, Chlorosarcinopsis, Cylindrocapsa [?])

- Class Chlorophyceae

- Order Chlorellales (e.g., Chlorella, Kirchneriella, Scenedesmus, Hydrodictyon, Pediastrum, Sphaeroplea, Atractomorpha)

- Class Oedogoniophyceae

- Order Oedogoniales (e.g., Oedogonium)

Many examples of genus given in the book could not be assigned to one of these classes, because the ultrastructural characteristics needed for their classification have not yet been studied.
