= Cosmarium tetragonum =

Scientific classification
- Kingdom: Plantae
- Class: Zygnematophyceae
- Order: Desmidiales
- Family: Desmidiaceae
- Genus: Cosmarium
- Species: C. tetragonum

Binomial name
- Cosmarium tetragonum (Nägeli) W.Archer in Pritchard 1861

Varieties
- Cosmarium tetragonum var. elegans (Roy & Bisset) West & G.S.West 1908 (syn. C. elegans)

Synonyms
- Euastrum tetragonum Nägeli

Species of alga

Cosmarium tetragonum is a species of green algae in the family Desmidiaceae. It is a freshwater species with a worldwide distribution.

== Description ==
The nominate variety (var. tetragonum) is about 35 to 48 μm long, and 20 to 26 μm wide, 14 to 18 μm thick, with an isthmus about 6 to 12 μm long. Semicells are roughly rectangular in outline, with undulated margins; each side has about four bumps and the top side has about two bumps.

== Varieties ==
Cosmarium tetragonum is variable and several varieties have been described. They are:

- Variety lundelii differs from the nominate variety that the lateral bumps are unequal; the two median bumps are larger.
- Variety bipapillatum also has two median bumps that are larger, but also has a protuberance right at the base of the semicell, near the isthmus.
- Variety ornatum has a crease that follows the margin of the cell; the crease may also have projections near the apex of the semicell.
- Variety intermedium has stout cells that are 1.5 times as long as broad; semicells are more trapezoidal.
