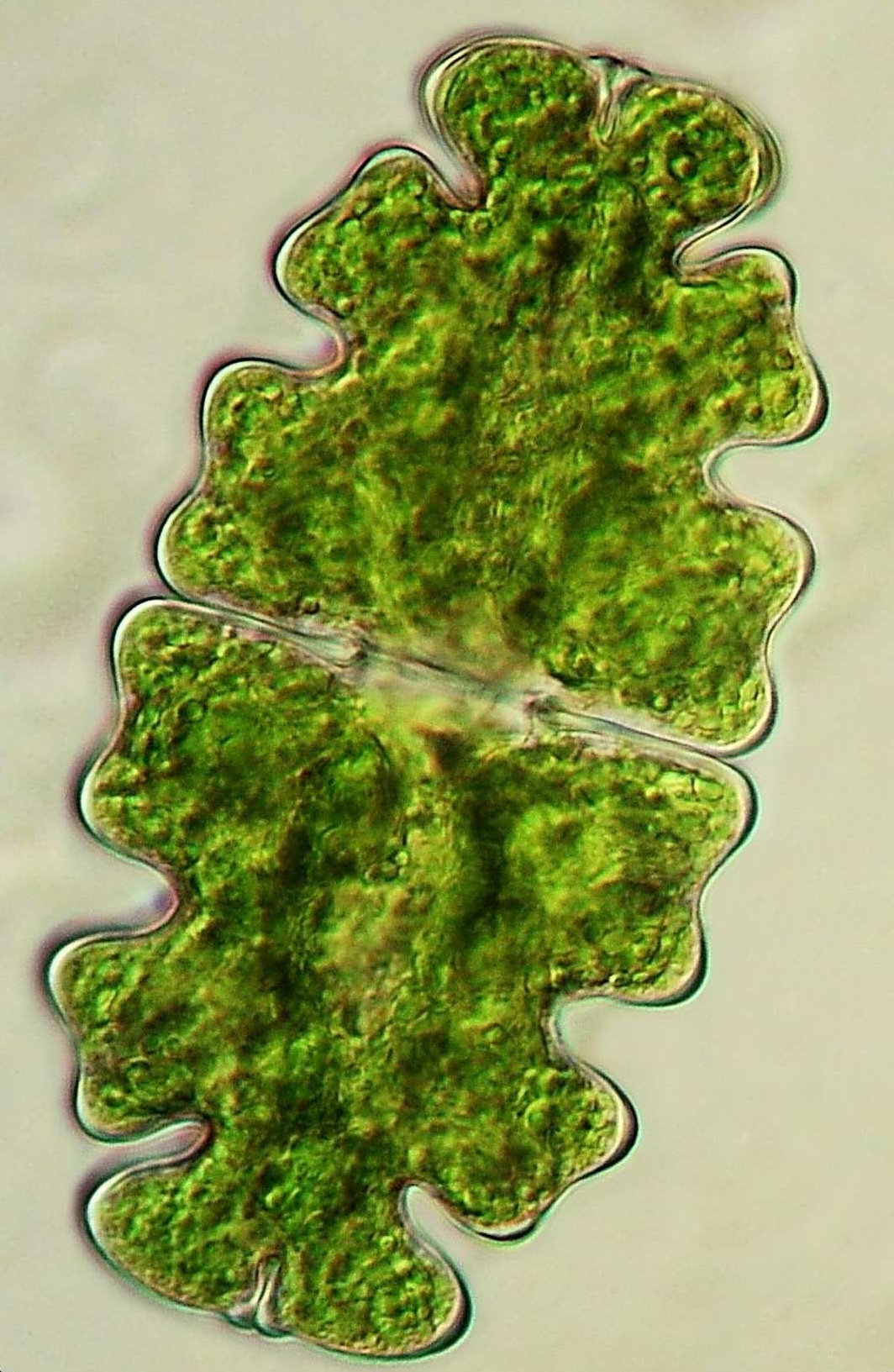

Scientific classification
- Kingdom: Plantae
- Class: Zygnematophyceae
- Order: Desmidiales
- Family: Desmidiaceae
- Genus: Euastrum
- Species: E. oblongum

Binomial name
- Euastrum oblongum Greville ex Ralfs

Synonyms
- Echinella oblonga

= Euastrum oblongum =

Species of alga

Euastrum oblongum is a species of desmid, in the family Desmidiaceae.

Euastrum oblongum consists of cells that are elliptic in outline, divide into two halves called semicells. The cells are typically 140–180 μm long and 65–85 μm wide. Semicells have a pair of basal lobes and a pair of lateral lobes, both with a shallow "pit" as to appear double-lobed. The apex is truncate with a deep notch. Semicells have a protuberance right above the isthmus (where the semicells are joined), as well as two more protuberances in the center of the cell and one in each lobe.

Euastrum oblongum occurs in mesotrophic waters. It has a widespread distribution, and has been recorded from around the world.
