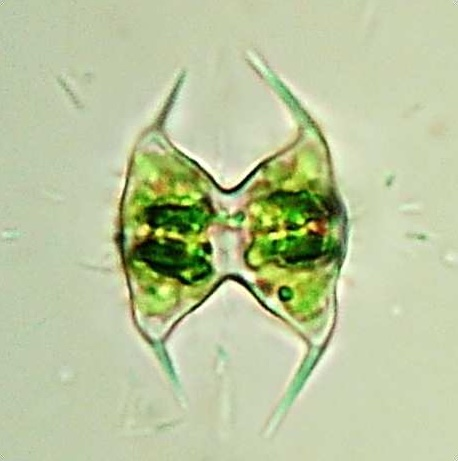
- Staurodesmus glaber

Scientific classification
- Kingdom: Plantae
- Class: Zygnematophyceae
- Order: Desmidiales
- Family: Desmidiaceae
- Genus: Staurodesmus

Type species
- Staurodesmus triangularis (Lagerheim) Teiling

Species
- S. bienianus; S. bulnheimii; S. convergens; S. dickiei; S. mamillatus; S. mucronatus; S. omearii; S. sp. UTEX LB 2508; S. subulatus; S. triangularis; S. validus

Synonyms
- Arthrodesmus Ehrenberg ex Ralfs

= Staurodesmus =

Genus of algae

Staurodesmus is a genus of green algae, specifically of the Desmidiaceae.

== History ==
The genus Staurodesmus was first circumscribed by the desmidiologist Einar Teiling. The defining characteristic of the genus is the single, unbranched spines at each angle of the semicell. Cell walls also lack protuberances or other ornamentations, which separate the genus from the similar Xanthidium.

The genus includes species formerly placed in Arthrodesmus and Staurastrum, the difference in the two genera being the number of planes of symmetry: Arthrodesmus was biradiate (having two planes of symmetry), while Staurastrum included species with three or more planes of symmetry. However, over the years desmidiologists found many specimens with one biradiate semicell and another tri- or quadriradiate semicell. As these cells could not soundly be placed into one genus, Teiling erected Staurodesmus; the name was made to be a portmanteau of Arthrodesmus and Staurastrum. Although Staurastrum is still used as a genus, Arthrodesmus is a later homonym (thus invalid) and is no longer used.

== Description ==
Staurodesmus consists of solitary cells that are divided into two symmetrical halves, called semicells. Semicells are diverse in shape, but are unified by having a single, unbranched spine at the angles of the semicells. The cell wall is smooth and lacks ornamentations other than pores or fine granules. Each semicell contains a single chloroplast.

Species of Staurodesmus are distinguished from each other by the shape of the cells, and the size and orientation of the spines.
