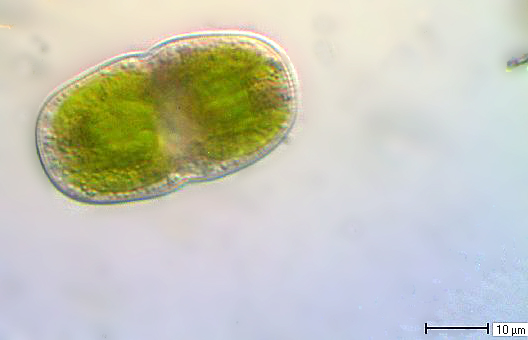
- Actinotaenium cucurbita

Scientific classification
- Domain: Eukaryota
- Supergroup: Archaeplastida
- Clade: Viridiplantae
- Class: Zygnematophyceae
- Order: Desmidiales
- Family: Desmidiaceae
- Genus: Actinotaenium (Nägeli) Teiling

Type species
- Actinotaenium curtum (Brébisson ex Ralfs) Teiling ex Růžička & Pouzar

Species
- A. capax; A. cucurbita; A. cucurbitinum; A. curtum; A. cruciferum; A. diplosporum; A. globosum; A. phymatosporum; A. rufescens; A. silvae-nigrae; A. turgidum; A. wollei

= Actinotaenium =

Genus of algae

Actinotaenium is a genus of green algae, specifically of the Desmidiaceae. It is a freshwater genus, typically found in the benthos of acidic, oligotrophic lakes or Sphagnum bogs. It has a cosmopolitan distribution.

Actinotaenium consists of solitary cells with two halves, called semicells; cells have a central constriction called an isthmus where the two semicells are joined. Cells are globose, ovoid, cylindrical or pyramidal when viewed from the side, but circular when viewed from the poles. The cell walls are covered in ornamentation such as fine pores, punctae or scrobiculae (pits); the distribution of ornamentation varies by species. Each semicell has a single chloroplast, which is stellate in cross-section and often with complex lobes.

Asexual reproduction occurs by vegetative cell division, similar to that of Cosmarium. Sexual reproduction is by conjugation, with zygotes forming between cells. Mature zygospores are quadrate, or globose with smooth walls, protuberances or spines.

== Taxonomic history ==
In 1849, Carl Nägeli proposed the genus Dysphinctium for elongate desmids with circular or oval vertical view. Within Dysphinctium he named three subgenera: Actinotaenium, Calocylindrus and Dysphinctium. These subgenera were largely not used by later taxonomists, and were instead placed in various genera including Cylindrocystis, Cosmarium, and Penium.

By the twentieth century, the genus Cosmarium was recognized as an unwieldly, heterogeneous assemblage of species; it was a wastebasket taxon, defined mostly by a lack of features in other genera. To partially remedy this, in 1954 the desmid taxonomist Einar Teiling split off species that are elongate, circular in apical view, and with a minimal constriction at the middle. In contrast, Cosmarium has since been defined to include species that are compressed in vertical view. Although widely, Teiling's contributions did not strictly adhere to the International Code of Botanical Nomenclature and this was fixed by J. Růžička & Z. Pouzar in 1978.

Although Teiling considered Actinotaenium to be a natural and "primitive" genus, the genus is known to be polyphyletic according to molecular phylogenetic studies.
