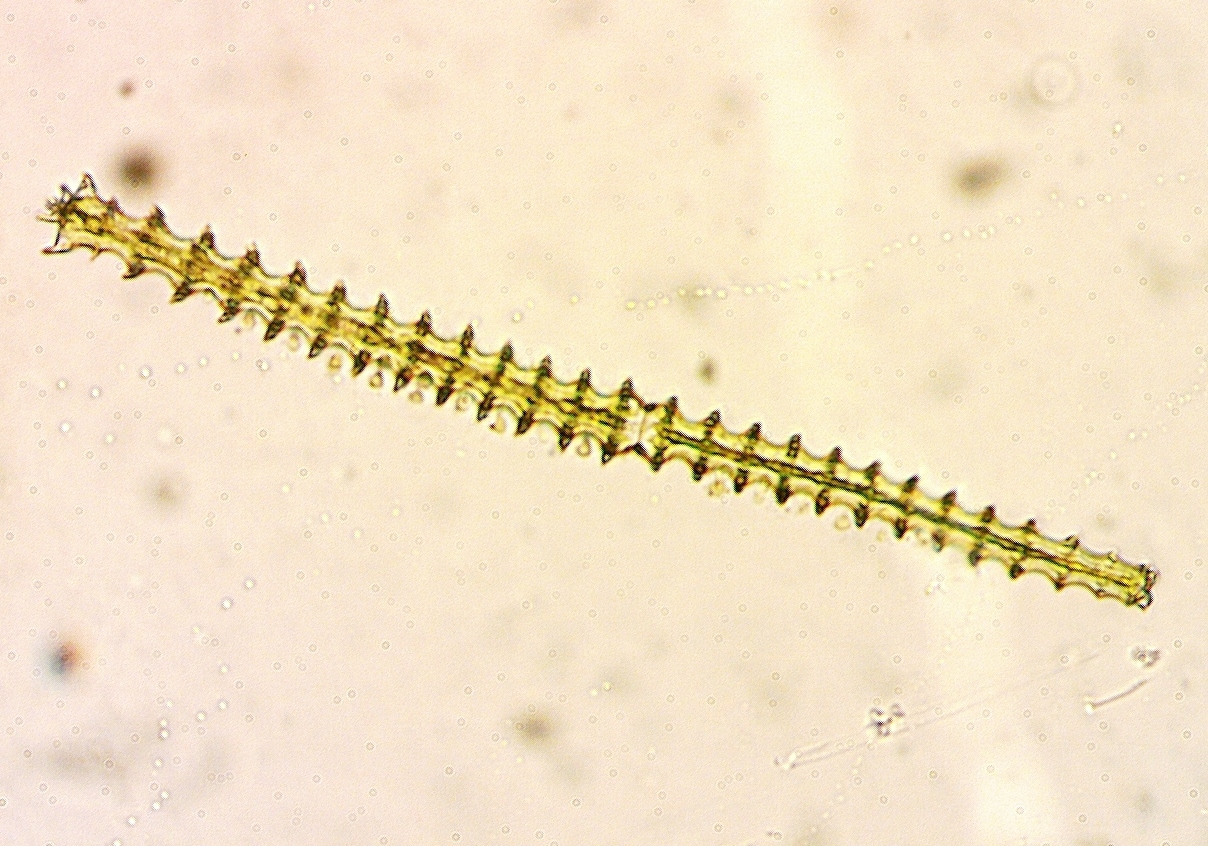
- Triploceras gracile

Scientific classification
- Kingdom: Plantae
- Class: Zygnematophyceae
- Order: Desmidiales
- Family: Desmidiaceae
- Genus: Triploceras; Bailey

Type species
- Triploceras verticillatum (Bailey) Bailey

Species
- T. gracile; T. splendens; T. verticillatum

= Triploceras =

Genus of algae

Triploceras is a genus of desmid (a type of green alga) in the family Desmidiaceae.

== Description ==
Triploceras exists as solitary cells, which are elongated and constricted at the middle (the constriction called an isthmus); the two halves are called semicells. At tip of either semicell, the cell is tipped with spiny lobes, similar to the polar lobes found in Micrasterias. Along the margins of the semicells are many whorls of processes that may be tipped with spines or teeth. Cells have one chloroplast filling the cell.

=== Identification ===
Triploceras is easily recognizable due to its elongated shape and polar lobes. The similar genus Triplastrum also has polar spines, but lacks protuberances along the sides of the cell.

== Phylogeny ==
Phylogenetically, Triploceras is currently known to be embedded within the genus Micrasterias. Despite the similar rod-like shape, it is not closely related to other rod-shaped genera such as Pleurotaenium or Triplastrum.

== Distribution ==
Two species, Triploceras gracile and T. verticillatum are widely distributed throughout the world. Another species, T. splendens is rare and restricted to Southeast Asia and northern Australia.
