= Prescottiella =

Scientific classification
- Kingdom: Plantae
- Class: Zygnematophyceae
- Order: Desmidiales
- Family: Desmidiaceae
- Genus: Prescottiella; C.E.M.Bicudo ex Levanets & Janse van Vuuren
- Species: P. sudanensis

Binomial name
- Prescottiella sudanensis Grönblad, Prowse & A.M.Scott ex Levanets & Janse van Vuuren

Genus of algae

Prescottiella is a rare genus of green algae in the family Desmidiaceae, containing the single species Prescottiella sudanensis. It is named after Gerald Webber Prescott, an American phycologist.

Originally classified as Micrasterias sudanensis in 1958, it was moved into its own genus by Carlos E. M. Bicudo in 1976, due to its asymmetric character. However, both names were not validly published as no types were indicated. Therefore, the genus name Prescottiella and species name Prescottiella sudanensis were validated by Sanet Janse van Vuuren and Anatoliy Levanets in 2023.

== Descriptions ==
Prescottiella sudanensis is a microscopic alga consisting of solitary cells. Cells range in size from 90 to 174 μm long and 94 to 180 μm wide, but are otherwise relatively uniform in morphology. Cells are flattened, deeply constricted at the middle forming an isthmus; the two halves are called semicells. Each semicell is divided into three lobes (two lateral, and one apical). Each lateral lobe ends in a pair of spines (one long and one short), and the apical lobe has two pairs of spines, one pair at each angle. In vertical view, the cells are fusiform. Each semicell has one large chloroplast filling the cell, with several pyrenoids. The cell nucleus is located at the center of the cell.

Prescottiella, unlike the similar genus Micrasterias, is asymmetrical; its semicells are not identical. In one semicell, the spines curve away from the isthmus, while the other semicell has spines curving towards from the isthmus. Additionally, in the lateral lobes, the long and short spines are in opposite locations per semicell.

== Reproduction ==
Nothing is known about how Prescottiella reproduces, although it is assumed to reproduce asexually by dividing along the isthmus, much the same way as other desmid genera as Cosmarium. Zygospores are unknown.

== Habitat and distribution ==
Prescottiella, like other desmids, is found in freshwater habitats. It is native to tropical Africa, where it appears to be an endemic. So far, it has only been recorded from five countries: South Sudan, the Central African Republic, Zambia, Botswana, and Namibia.
