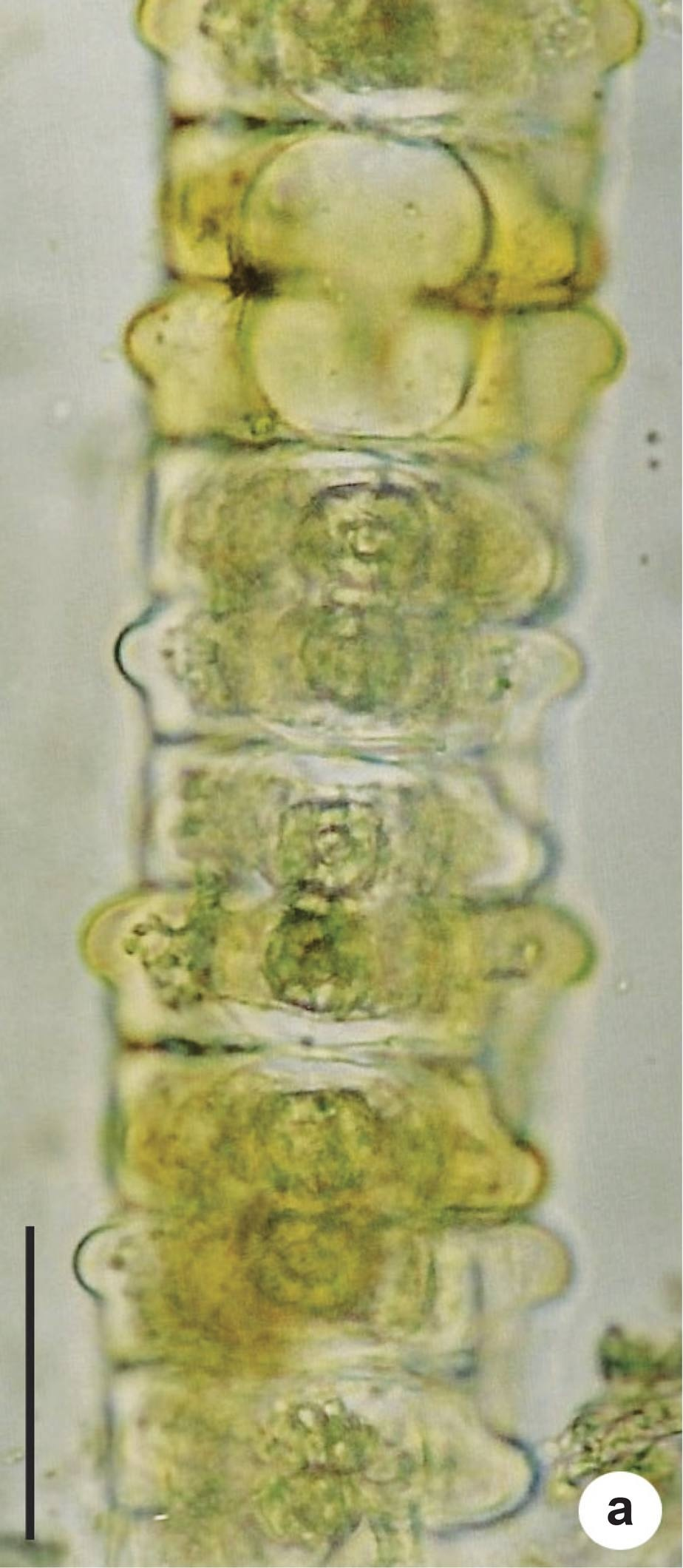
- Phymatodocis alternans

Scientific classification
- Kingdom: Plantae
- Class: Zygnematophyceae
- Order: Desmidiales
- Family: Desmidiaceae
- Genus: Phymatodocis

Type species
- Phymatodocis alternans Nordstedt

Species
- P. alternans; P. irregularis; P. nordstedtiana

= Phymatodocis =

Genus of algae

Phymatodocis is a genus of green algae, specifically of the Desmidiaceae. It is a rare genus, usually found in acidic, oligotrophic freshwater habitats. They are mostly restricted to the tropics and subtropics, but one species is found in temperate North America.

== Description ==
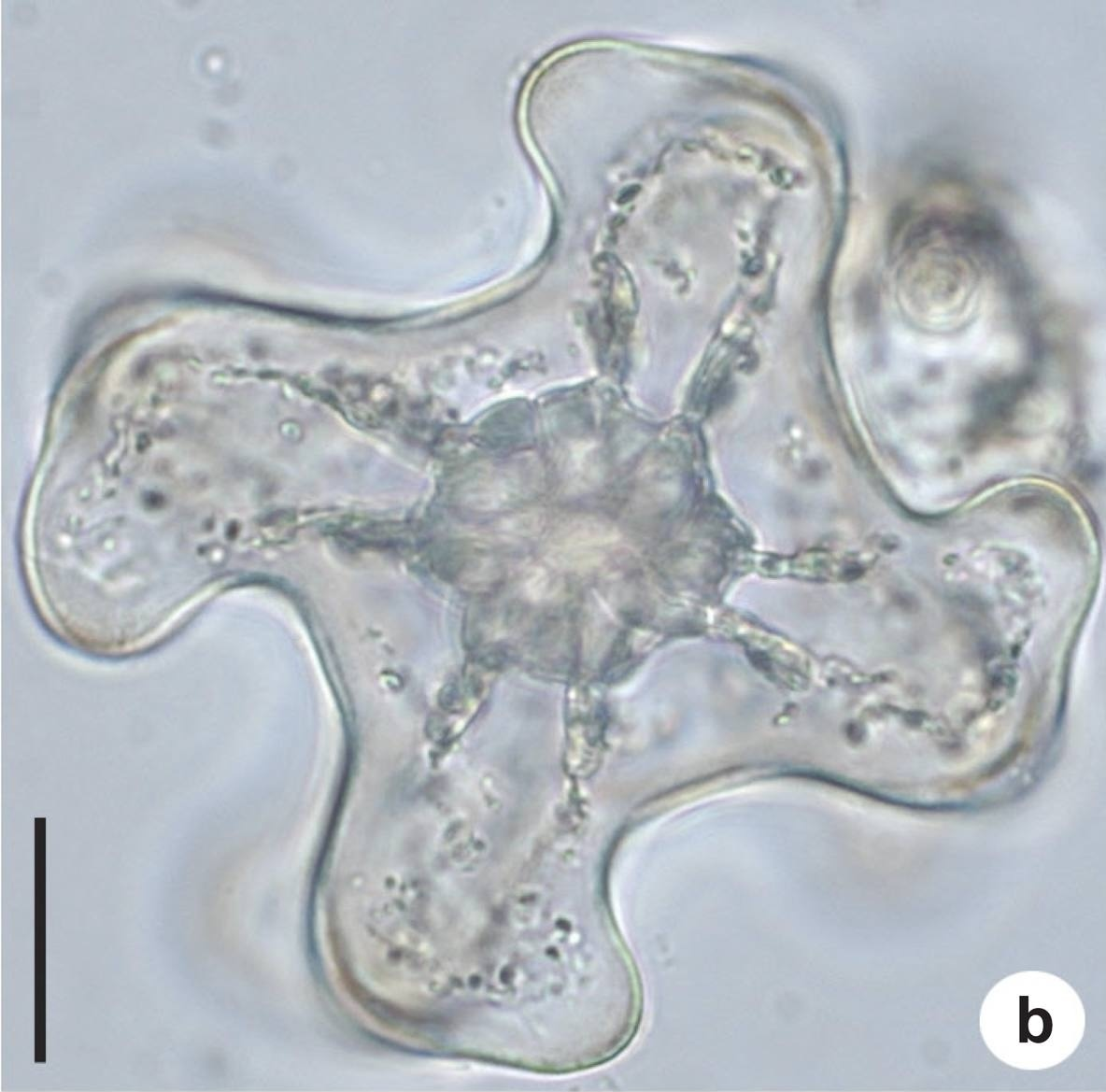
P. alternans, cell in apical view showing four lobes

Phymatodocis consists of cells attached end-to-end to form filaments. Cells are rectangular in lateral view, with a moderately deep constriction (=isthmus) at the middle, forming two halves called semicells. In apical view, the cells are irregularly (and often asymmetrically) four-lobed (occasionally three- or five-lobed). The cell wall has pores typical of most desmids, except for P. nordstedtiana, but the wall ultrastructure is reminiscent of Penium or Closterium, consisting of a dense matrix embedded among crossed bands of microfibrils. Each semicell has one chloroplast with one or two pyrenoids, and lobes which fill the semicell lobes.

Asexual reproduction involves cell division subsequent formation of semicells, typical of most desmids. Sexual reproduction has been observed in two species, as conjugation between two cells. The filaments may or may not dissociate prior to conjugation. Conjugation results in zygospores, which are irregularly quadrate and with thick cell walls.

== Taxonomy ==
The cell wall ultrastructure of Phymatodocis is unusual and is intermediate between the more simpler structures found in Closteriaceae and Peniaceae, and the more complex structures in the rest of the family Desmidiaceae. It may be separate enough to warrant its own subfamily or family.

Phylogenetic relationships between Phymatodocis and related taxa are summarized as follows:

- - Peniaceae pro parte
  - - Phymatodocis
    - - Peniaceae pro parte
      - Desmidiaceae (excluding Phymatodocis)
