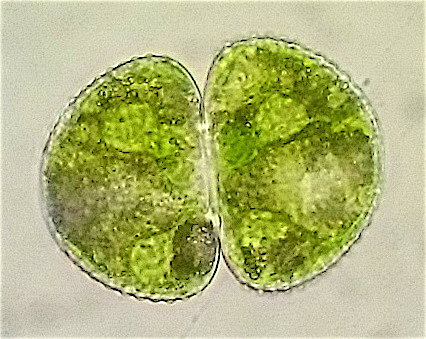

Scientific classification
- Kingdom: Plantae
- Class: Zygnematophyceae
- Order: Desmidiales
- Family: Desmidiaceae
- Genus: Cosmarium
- Species: C. botrytis

Binomial name
- Cosmarium botrytis Meneghini ex Ralfs

= Cosmarium botrytis =

Species of alga

Cosmarium botrytis is a species of green algae in the family Desmidiaceae. It is a freshwater species with a worldwide distribution, and has been recorded from all continents.

== Description ==
The nominate variety (var. botrytis) is about 60 to 111 μm long, 51 to 85 μm wide, and 32 to 40 μm thick, with an isthmus that is about 14 to 26 μm long. Cells are roughly ellipsoidal in outline with two semicells. Semicells are ovate-pyramidal with a broad, flat base; the lower angles are rounded, and the tip of the semicell is truncate. The cell wall is uniformly covered with smallish granulations; the margins are lined with about 30 to 36 granules. When viewed from the side or top, Cosmarium botrytis appears elliptical.

Zygospores have been observed in Cosmarium botrytis: they are spherical and covered with short processes that are tipped with three (sometimes four) spines.

== Taxonomy ==
Cosmarium botrytis, along with other similar Cosmarium species, displays a large amount of morphological variation. Many varieties have been described.
