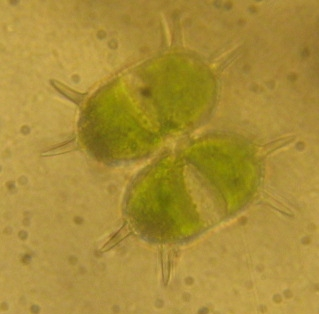

Scientific classification
- Kingdom: Plantae
- Class: Zygnematophyceae
- Order: Desmidiales
- Family: Desmidiaceae
- Genus: Xanthidium; Ehrenb. ex Ralfs, 1848

Type species
- Xanthidium aculeatum Ehrenb. ex Ralfs

Species
- X. aculeatum; X. antilopaeum; X. armatum; X. brebissonii; X. cristatum; X. hastiferum; X. impar; X. regulare; X. subhastiferum; X. superbum; X. trilobum

= Xanthidium =

Genus of algae

Xanthidium is a genus of green algae, specifically of the Desmidiaceae.

The name Xanthidium is a diminutive of Xanthium, and presumably refers to its spines, reminiscent of the prickly fruits of Xanthium.

== Description ==
Xanthidium exists as symmetrical single cells. Cells are deeply constricted, forming two halves called semicells; they are rectangular, rounded, or polygonal in front view, flattened. The angles are usually drawn out into spines, which are typically paired and sometimes branched. Semicells often have a protuberance or additional spine in the center of the semicell. Cells have two or many axile chloroplasts which fill the cell. A notable exception is the species Xanthidium tumidum, formerly placed in the genus Staurastrum as Staurastrum tumidum. Morphologically it is triangular in cross section (unlike other species, which are flattened in cross section). Its placement in this genus is due to molecular data.

=== Identification ===
Species identification of Xanthidium depends on the shape of the cell, cell wall ornamentation, and location and number of the spines. However, some species such as Xanthidium antilopaeum are notoriously polymorphic.

== Habitat ==
Like other desmids, most species of Xanthidium prefer acidic waters.
