= William Archer (naturalist) =

William Archer FRS
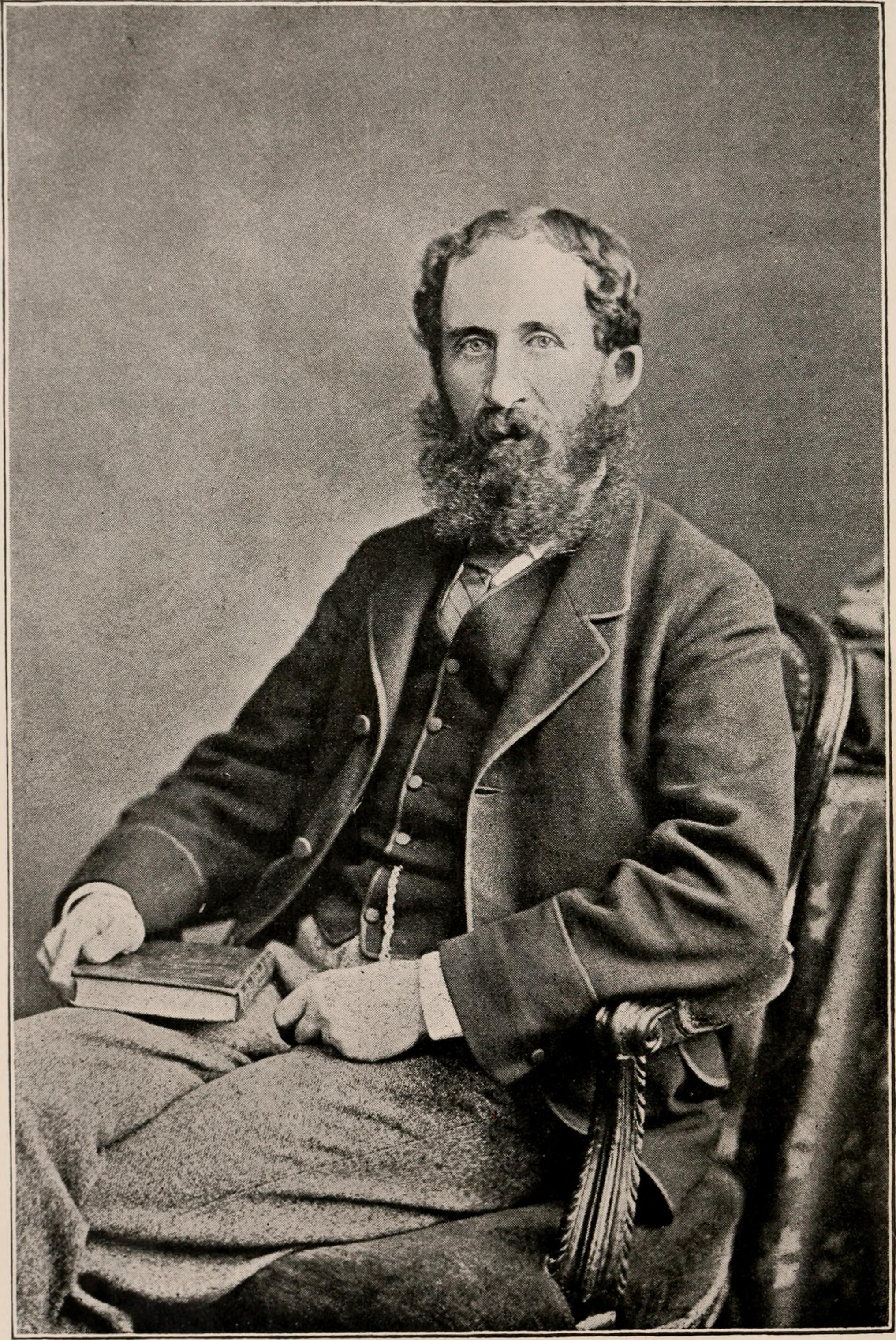
- Born: 6 May 1830; Magherahamlet
- Died: 14 August 1897 (aged 67)
- Citizenship: Irish
- Known for: Microscopy, Dublin University Zoological Association, First Librarian of the National Library of Ireland
- Awards: Fellow Royal society
- Scientific career
- Fields: Naturalist, Librarianship

William Archer FRS (6 May 1830 (1827?)–14 August 1897) was an Irish naturalist and microscopist especially interested in Protozoa and Desmids. He served as the first librarian of the National Library of Ireland (NLI) from 1878 to 1895.

== Early life and family ==
William Archer was born on 6 May 1830 in Maghera hamlet, County Down. He was the eldest son of the Reverend Richard Archer (d. 1849) and Jane Matilda (Campbell) (d. 1866). William Frazier, Archer's colleague at the National Library of Ireland, wrote in Archer’s obituary that he was the "eldest son". Frazier’s obituary also mentions Archer’s "only brother, Holt Waring Archer". However, various sources cite two younger brothers: Holt Waring Archer and Richard Henry Verling (H.V.) Archer, and one sister, Matilda Jane Humphreys (Archer). Sources differ on Archer’s exact siblings and their birth order, often mentioning the other siblings but not William. Swanzy's entry for Rev. Richard Archer describes second son Holt, third son Richard H.V., and a daughter Jane, but there is no mention of William Archer listed as first son.

Archer's father was born in Wexford and was ordained a curate in 1823. Archer's parents were married in Dublin in 1825, the same year that Rev. Archer graduated from university at Trinity College, Dublin. Rev. Archer was the Primary Curate of Maghera hamlet from 1825 to 1835, going on to become the primary curate of Clonduff. Rev. Archer died in Hilltown Glebe on 23 October 1849. His death left "a young family in straitened circumstances". Both of Archer's brothers predeceased him: Richard H.V. Archer died in 1863 and Holt Waring Archer died in 1883. His sister, Matilda Jane, married Dr. Hutchinson D. Humphreys in 1852. His mother Jane died in Dublin in 1866.

His paternal grandparents were William and Mary Archer. Archer’s great-uncle on his maternal side, the Reverend Holt Waring, was the Dean of Dromore. His maternal grandfather was Watkins William Verling from Dublin. His brother Richard was a Barrister in a landed estates court in Cavan.

Archer moved to Dublin around 1849, where he helped found the Dublin Microscopical Society and became involved in pursuits of scientific study and librarianship which would define his life and career, spending "his early life…unselfishly devoted to scientific research by which he secured a widespread reputation little understood beyond the abstract world of science."

== Career and role in librarianship ==
After his move to Dublin around 1849, Archer pursued a career in business, but quickly made a name for himself as a talented naturalist in his leisure time. He was a founding member of the Dublin Microscopical Club, of which he eventually became secretary. In the subsequent period, Archer's scientific work was frequently published in the Quarterly Journal of Microscopical Science and in the club's Proceedings, as well as the Proceedings of the Dublin Natural History Society. He achieved particular fame and recognition for his work on protozoa and minute fresh water organisms. As a result of his efforts, Archer became a member of the Royal Irish Academy (RIA), and was made a fellow of the Royal Society in 1875. In 1879, he was also awarded the Cunningham Medal of the RIA. Despite these achievements, Archer's humble and shy character seemingly led him to decline opportunities like a professorship of botany at the Royal College of Science for Ireland.

Archer subsequently made a career change when he became the librarian of the Royal Dublin Society in 1877. This particular role did not last, as the library was acquired by the state, and swiftly absorbed into the National Library of Ireland (NLI) the following year. Luckily for Archer, the Council of Trustees decided to appoint him as the first librarian of the NLI in February 1878. Setting himself to his task with zeal, Archer quickly gained a positive reputation among librarians for his dedication and work ethic. Under his purview, the library became one of the first to implement the Dewey Decimal Classification System. Archer likewise strongly influenced the internal design of the new library building, inspiring Dublin-based architects, Deane & Son, with his 1881 pamphlet: "Suggestions as to public library buildings: their internal plan and construction, best adapted to effect economy of space." Archer retired from his post in 1895 due to poor health, but his establishment of relatively novel systems like the Dewey Decimal Classification, as well as a dictionary catalogue had a lasting positive impact for library users.

== Later life and death ==
After retiring his health continued to decline. Archer became disabled due to his illnesses. He died on 14 August 1987 at his house, 52 Lower Mount Street, Dublin, Ireland. According to the Oxford Dictionary of National Biography, at the time of William Archer’s death he had: "£254 3s. 9d. effects in England: Irish probate sealed in London, 21 Jan 1898, CGPLA Eng. & Wales" and "£703 14s. 1d.: probate, 14 Dec 1897, CGPLA Ire."

Archer was said to believe that, "All the machinery and the clever devices of librarians have one important end — to serve the reader, to place rapidly before every student, sooner or later, the source of information which he needs."
