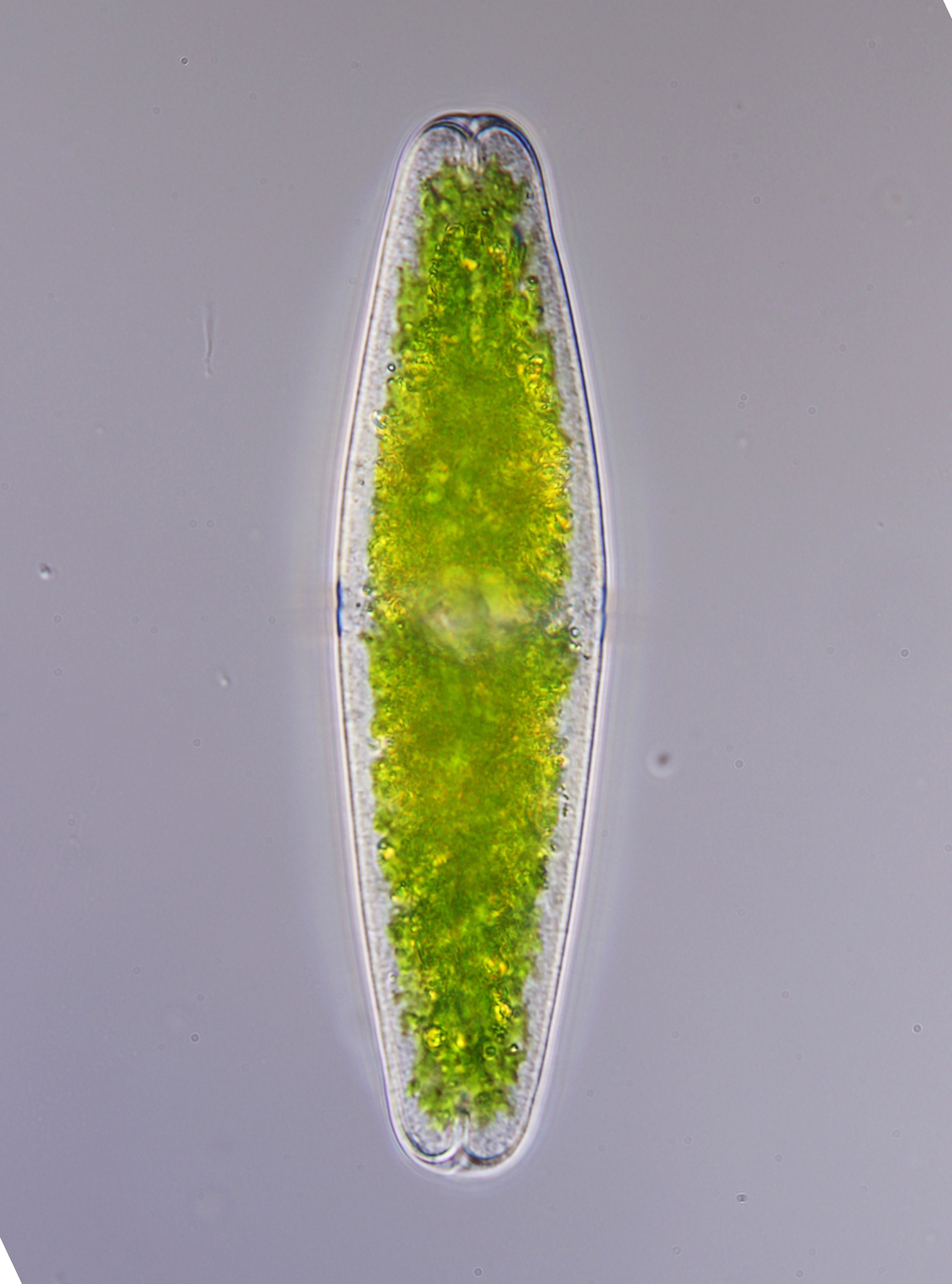
- Tetmemorus laevis

Scientific classification
- Kingdom: Plantae
- Class: Zygnematophyceae
- Order: Desmidiales
- Family: Desmidiaceae
- Genus: Tetmemorus; Ralfs ex Ralfs

Species
- T. brebissonii; (more)

= Tetmemorus =

Genus of algae

Tetmemorus is a genus of green algae, specifically of the Desmidiaceae.
