= Sphaerozosma =

Scientific classification
- Kingdom: Plantae
- Class: Zygnematophyceae
- Order: Desmidiales
- Family: Desmidiaceae
- Genus: Sphaerozosma; Corda ex Ralfs

Type species
- Sphaerozosma vertebratum Brébisson ex Ralfs

Species
- S. granulatum; S. sp. UTCC 284

Genus of algae

Sphaerozosma is a genus of green algae, specifically of the Desmidiaceae. It occurs in acidic, oligotrophic freshwater habitats and is found worldwide.

== Description ==
Sphaerozosma consists of cells which are flattened (and thus biradiate in apical view); the cells are attached end-to-end to form short or long filaments. At the apex of each cell there is a pair of obliquely placed, small rod-like processes; cells are attached to each other via these processes. The cell wall has pores arranged in horizontal or oblique lines. Cells are deeply constricted at the middle, forming two halves (called semicells). Each semicell has a single chloroplast with a central pyrenoid. The nucleus is at the isthmus where the two semicells are joined.

== Reproduction ==
Reproduction in Sphaerozosma can be asexual or sexual. In asexual reproduction, the cell divides and forms new semicells in the same manner as other (Cosmarium-type) desmids. After cytokinesis occurs and the new semicells develop, the primary cell wall is shed from all but the apical region, where it remains connecting the daughter cells in the new filament. Sexual reproduction is by conjugation, where filaments disintegrate into individual cells. Zygotes form between cells (=gametangia), and develop into zygospores. Mature zygospores are spherical, with a smooth cell wall or covered with spines or protuberances.

== Taxonomy ==
The genus Onychonema is morphologically very similar and sometimes considered to be a synonym of Sphaerozosma. When the two genera are considered separate, Onychonema differs in having longer, more distantly spaced apical processes.
