= Gerald Webber Prescott =

American botanist

Gerald W. Prescott
- Born: September 25, 1899; LaPorte City, Iowa
- Died: July 7, 1988 (aged 88)
- Education: University of Oregon; University of Iowa
- Scientific career
- Fields: Botany
- Workplaces: Willamette University; Albion College; Michigan State University University of Montana
- Author abbrev. (botany): Prescott

Gerald Webber Prescott (September 25, 1899 – July 7, 1988) was an American botanist, phycologist, and professor.

== Career ==
After serving in World War I, Prescott studied botany at the University of Oregon, earning his B.S. in 1923. He pursued an M.A. from the University of Iowa, which he received in 1926. He continued his studies at Iowa and earned his Ph.D. in 1928.

After receiving his Ph.D., Prescott served as an associate professor at Willamette University from 1928 to 1929, and at Albion College from 1929 to 1946. In 1946, he went on to become a professor of botany at Michigan State College. His areas of research included limnology and phycology. He remained there until his retirement in 1968. Much of his retirement was spent as Resident Biologist at the Flathead Lake Biological Station.

Prescott took part in the Cinchona Missions in Ecuador to help gather quinine to treat malaria in the armed forces during WWII.

Prescott served as president of the Phycological Society of America in 1954, the Association for the Sciences of Limnology and Oceanography in 1965, and the American Microscopical Society in 1968.

== Legacy ==
The Phycological Society of America gives out the Gerald W. Prescott Award to recognize a published book or monograph devoted to phycology, as determined by the G.W. Prescott Award Committee. The algal genus Prescottiella is named after him.
