= Heimansia =

Scientific classification
- Kingdom: Plantae
- Class: Zygnematophyceae
- Order: Desmidiales
- Family: Desmidiaceae
- Genus: Heimansia; Coesel

Type species
- Heimansia pusilla (L.Hilse) Coesel

Species
- Heimansia pusilla (L.Hilse) Coesel; Heimansia tumida (L.N.Johnson) Coesel

Genus of algae

Heimansia is a genus of freshwater green algae, specifically of the Desmidiaceae.

The genus name of Heimansia is in honour of Jacobus Heimans (1889-1978), who was a Dutch botanist (Bryology and Algology) and was Curator of the Herbarium at the University of Amsterdam.

The genus was circumscribed by Peter F. M. Coesel in Crypt. Algol. vol.14 on page 107 in 1993.

== Description ==
Heimansia consists of small, branched filaments or colonies. The cells are held together by remnants of the parental cell walls, which sometimes forms an "H"-shape between the cells. Individual cells of Heimansia are constricted, with two broadly ellipsoidal halves (semicells); each semicell has a single axial chloroplast. The cell walls are smooth.

Heimansia is similar to Cosmocladium, from which it differs in having cells connected by cell wall remnants (as opposed to microfibrillar threads in Cosmocladium).
