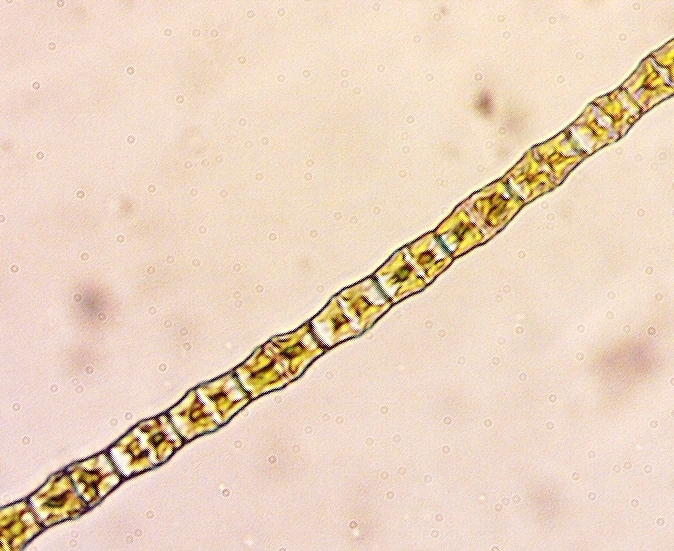
- Bambusina borreri

Scientific classification
- Kingdom: Plantae
- Class: Zygnematophyceae
- Order: Desmidiales
- Family: Desmidiaceae
- Genus: Bambusina; Kützing ex Kützing, 1849

Type species
- Bambusina brebissonii Kützing

Species
- B. armata; B. borreri; B. confervacea; B. delicatissima; B. eckertii; B. longicollis; B. madagascariensis; B. sphaerospora

= Bambusina =

Genus of algae

Bambusina is a genus of freshwater green algae in the family Desmidiaceae. Bambusina is a cosmopolitan genus, typically associated with acidic and oligotrophic waters. Species of this genus, particularly B. borreri, have been reported in all continents except Antarctica.

== Description ==
Bambusina consists of barrel-shaped cells joined end-to-end to form filaments. The cells are elongate (wider than long) and have a shallow median constriction (isthmus) where the two halves (semicells) meet. Cells are biradiate, omniradiate or rarely triradiate in cross section. The cell wall has longitudinal rows of pores, and may sometimes have a row of pointed spines. Each semicell has a single chloroplast which is stellate in cross section, with a central pyrenoid. A nucleus is located in the isthmus.

== Reproduction ==
Asexual reproduction is via transverse cell division. During cell division, a folded, plicate cell wall is deposited between along the plane of division. In this unusual mechanism, as the two semicells pull apart, the cell wall unfolds and expands, similar to that of a telescoping mechanism. Sexual reproduction is by conjugation. During conjugating, typically one or both of the filaments breaks up into individual cells. The mature zygote is irregularly spherical or ovoid.

== Taxonomy ==
There are currently 8 accepted species in Bambusina. The type species for this genus is Bambusina borreri (Ralfs) Cleve 1864, although it was first was described as Bambusina brebissonii by Kützing in 1849 and separately as Desmidium borreri by John Ralfs in 1848.

Two species, B. armata and B. eckertii, are sometimes considered to be part of a separate genus, Hoplozyga (also spelled Haplozyga).
