= Groenbladia =

Scientific classification
- Kingdom: Plantae
- Class: Zygnematophyceae
- Order: Desmidiales
- Family: Desmidiaceae
- Genus: Groenbladia; Teiling

Type species
- Groenbladia neglecta (Raciborski) Teiling

Species
- G. neglecta; G. undulata

Genus of algae

Groenbladia is a genus of green algae, specifically of the Desmidiaceae. It has a cosmopolitan distribution in acidic, oligotrophic freshwater habitats; it may occasionally form blooms.

The genus name of Groenbladia is in honour of Rolf Leo Grönblad (1895-1962), who was a Finnish dentist and botanist (Algology), who worked in Finland.

The genus was circumscribed by Einar Johan Sigurd Teiling in Bot. Not. (1952) on page 275 in 1952.

== Description ==
Groenbladia forms long or short filaments of cells, which are often surrounded by a gelatinous sheath. Cells are elongate, cylindrical (sometimes narrowing towards the ends), and are up to nine times longer than broad; there may be a slight constriction at the middle of the cell (isthmus). On each side of the isthmus, there is a transverse row of pores. Each cell has two chloroplasts, which are axial, band-shaped, with one to eight pyrenoids.

Aplanospores have been reported in one species, G. neglecta; the aplanospores are yellowish and elliptical. Sexual reproduction occurs by conjugation. During conjugation, cells (i.e. gametangia) become geniculate and produce a broad tube in which the gametes fuse. Mature zygospores are quadrangular, surrounded by the conjugation tube and gametangial cell walls.

Species are distinguished based on the shape of the cells.
