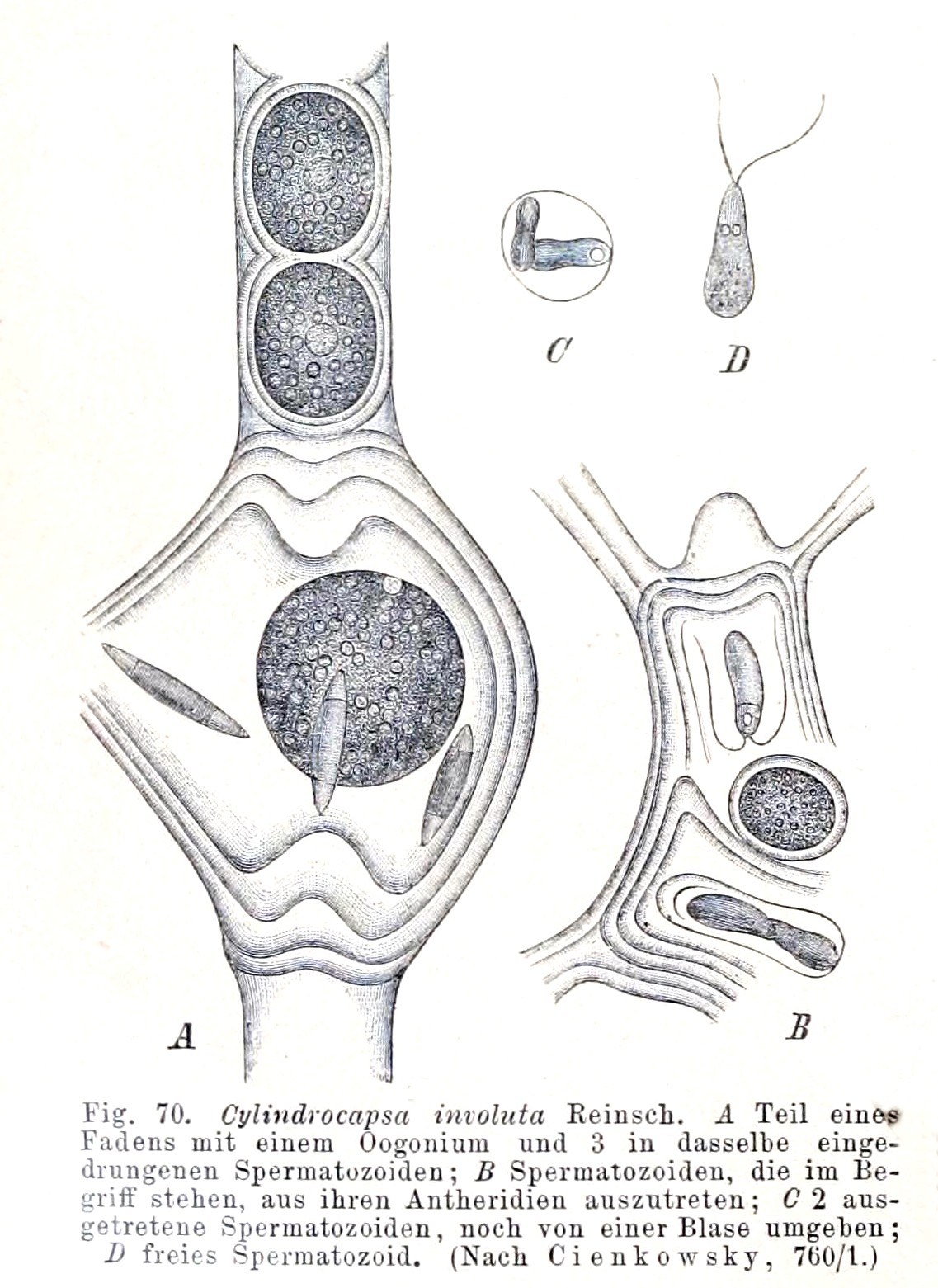
- Cylindrocapsa involuta

Scientific classification
- Clade: Viridiplantae
- Division: Chlorophyta
- Class: Chlorophyceae
- Order: Sphaeropleales
- Family: Cylindrocapsaceae
- Genus: Cylindrocapsa; Reinsch

Type species
- Cylindrocapsa involuta Reinsch

Species
- C. involuta; C. geminella

= Cylindrocapsa =

Genus of algae

Cylindrocapsa is a genus of green algae, specifically of the Chlorophyceae. It is commonly found in freshwater habitats.

Virus-like particles have been found in a strain of one species, Cylindrocapsa geminella.

== Description ==
Cylindrocapsa consists of unbranched filaments, often attached to substrates or free-floating in water. Cells are initially uniseriate (that is, in one line), but may later become multi-seriate or irregularly arranged. Individual cells are ovoid to oblong to spherical, and are each surrounded by several concentric layers of a mucilaginous sheath. Cells contain a single chloroplast filling the cell, with a single pyrenoid. The chloroplast may be axial (in the middle of the cell) or parietal (lining the wall of the cell).

== Taxonomy ==
The placement of Cylindrocapsa is unclear. Species differ significantly from each other, both in terms of morphology and ultrastructure. It is therefore suspected to be polyphyletic.
