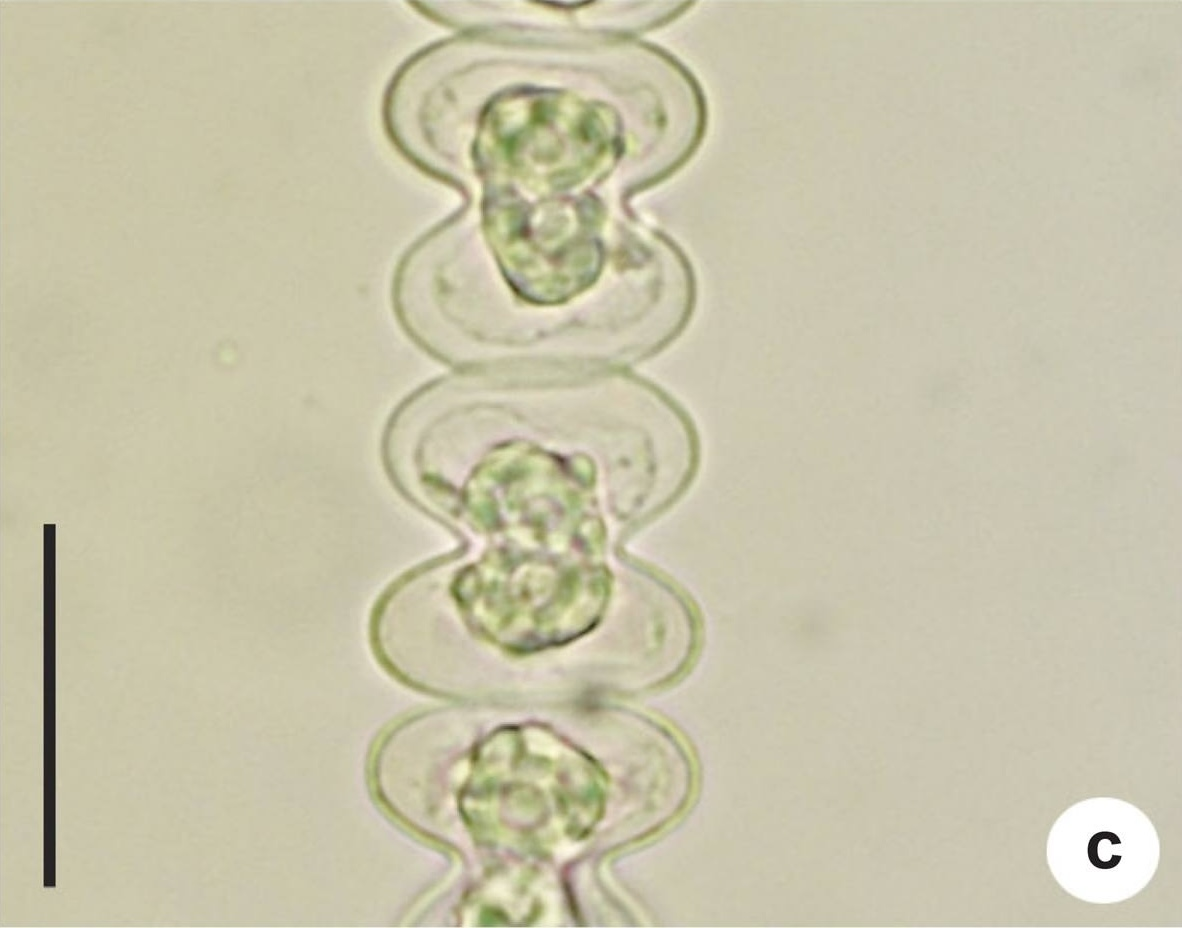
- Spondylosium ellipticum

Scientific classification
- Kingdom: Plantae
- Class: Zygnematophyceae
- Order: Desmidiales
- Family: Desmidiaceae
- Genus: Spondylosium; Brébisson ex Kützing, 1849

Type species
- Spondylosium depressum Brébisson

Species
- S. panduriforme; S. planum; S. pulchellum; S. pulchrum; S. secedens

= Spondylosium =

Genus of algae

Spondylosium is a genus of green algae, specifically of the Desmidiaceae. Like other desmids, it prefers acidic, oligotrophic freshwater lakes and ponds. It has a cosmopolitan distribution.

Spondylosium is a heterogeneous assemblage of species. Molecular phylogenetic studies have shown that it is polyphyletic.

== Description ==
Spondylosium consists of cells attached end-to-end to form filaments; the filaments are typically free-floating but in one species (S. pulchellum) is attached by a long gelatinous stalk. The cell wall is generally smooth but may have pores or granules. Cells are biradiate or triradiate in apical view, and is divided into two halves called semicells; the cell is deeply constricted at the middle where the two semicells join. Each semicell has one central chloroplast with two (in biradiate species) or three (in triradiate species) lobes. The chloroplast may have a single central pyrenoid or several scattered pyrenoids. The nucleus is located in the center of the cell.

Spondylosium divides asexually, forming daughter cells (the mechanism is similar to that of typical desmids). After division, the primary cell wall is retained, keeping the cells attached together. Sexual reproduction occurs via conjugation. Before conjugation, filaments disintegrate into individual cells, and zygotes form between gametangia (=cells). Mature zygospores are spherical or irregular and with a smooth or spiny surface.

Spondylosium is similar to the genus Teilingia, but the latter genus has granules along the apical margin of the cells.
