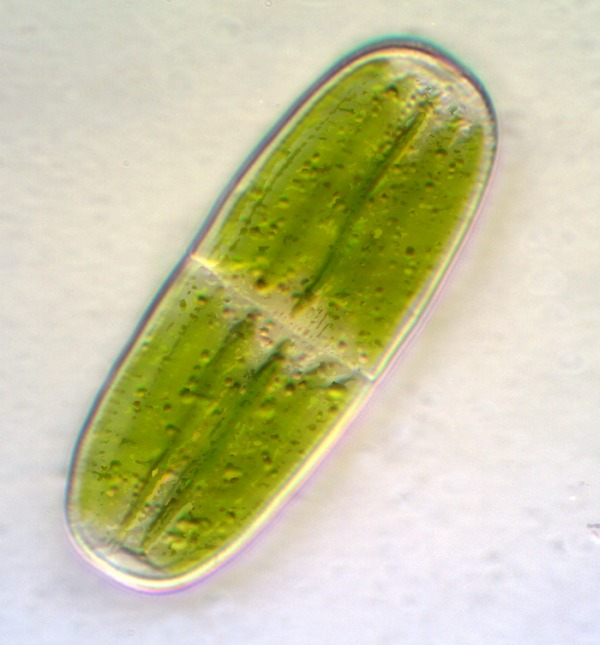
- Penium polymorphum

Scientific classification
- Kingdom: Plantae
- Class: Zygnematophyceae
- Order: Desmidiales
- Family: Peniaceae
- Genus: Penium; Bréb. ex Ralfs

Species
- P. cylindrus; P. exiguum; P. margaritaceum; P. spirostriolatum

= Penium =

Genus of algae

Penium is a genus of green algae, and the sole member of the family Peniaceae. The genus contains about 39 species.
