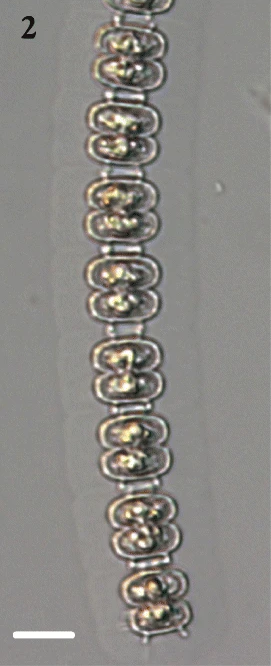
- Onychonema filiforme

Scientific classification
- Kingdom: Plantae
- Class: Zygnematophyceae
- Order: Desmidiales
- Family: Desmidiaceae
- Genus: Onychonema

Type species
- Onychonema uncinatum G.C.Wallich

Species
- O. laeve; O. uncinatum

= Onychonema =

Genus of algae

Onychonema is a genus of green algae, specifically of the Desmidiaceae. Members of the genus have a cosmopolitan distribution.

== Description ==
Onychonema consists of cells attached to each other end-to-end, forming chains of cells called pseudofilaments. The cells are strongly constricted at the middle forming a narrow isthmus, forming two halves called semicells. The sinus between the semicells is deep and linear. Semicells are transversely elliptical or reniform, with smooth lateral margins or with spines along the margin. The cell wall may be smooth or porous. Cells are flattened, and therefore ellipsoidal in apical view. Cells are connected to each other at their apices, via two separate capitate extensions (processes). The two processes are obliquely oriented, such that one appears to be in front of the semicell and one appears to be behind it. The filaments are generally helically twisted and may be surrounded in a sheath of mucilage.

== Taxonomy ==
Onychonema is very similar to Sphaerozosma, and sometimes considered to be a synonym (taxonomy) of Sphaerozosma. Onychonema has longer apical processes than Sphaerozosma, and are attached lower on the cell such that they appear to overlap with the cell. Sphaerozosma, in contrast, has short processes that are attached very close to each other on the apex of the cell. In addition, in Onychonema has a large pad of mucilage between neighboring semicells, while in Sphaerozosma the mucilage surrounds only the apical processes.
