= Cosmocladium =

Scientific classification
- Kingdom: Plantae
- Class: Zygnematophyceae
- Order: Desmidiales
- Family: Desmidiaceae
- Genus: Cosmocladium; Brébisson, 1856

Type species
- Cosmocladium pulchellum Brébisson

Species
- C. carinthiacum; C. constrictum; C. hitchcockii; C. perissum; C. pulchellum; C. saxonicum; C. subramosum; C. tuberculatum

Genus of algae

Cosmocladium is a genus of freshwater green algae, specifically of the Desmidiaceae. Currently there are 7 accepted species, though there are 11 described. The holotype is Cosmocladium pulchellum Brébisson described in 1856.

Cosmocladium is a colonial organism, consisting of usually up to 16 cells. Colonies may be free-floating or attached to filamentous algae. The cells are typically quite small, consisting of two identical halves called semicells, and are constricted at the isthmus where the semicells are joined. Cells are connected to each other by thin strands (bundles of microfibrils) secreted by special pores near isthmus, forming a branched network. Semicells are ellipsoid or elongate-oval in apical view, with one chloroplast per semicell each containing a central pyrenoid. The cell wall is smooth. A single nucleus is found in the center of each cell.

Asexual reproduction occurs by binary cellular division, similar to that of most other desmids, or by fragmentation of colonies. Sexual reproduction occurs by conjugation; the resulting zygospores are spherical with short, stout spines.

Cosmocladium is unusual among desmids in having branched, irregular colonies. It is not typically confused with other genera except for Heimansia, which differs in having cells attached to each other by remnants of the parental cell wall. Species are distinguished by cell shape.

Cosmocladium is found mainly in acidic, oligotrophic waters in North America, Europe, Asia, and New Zealand.
