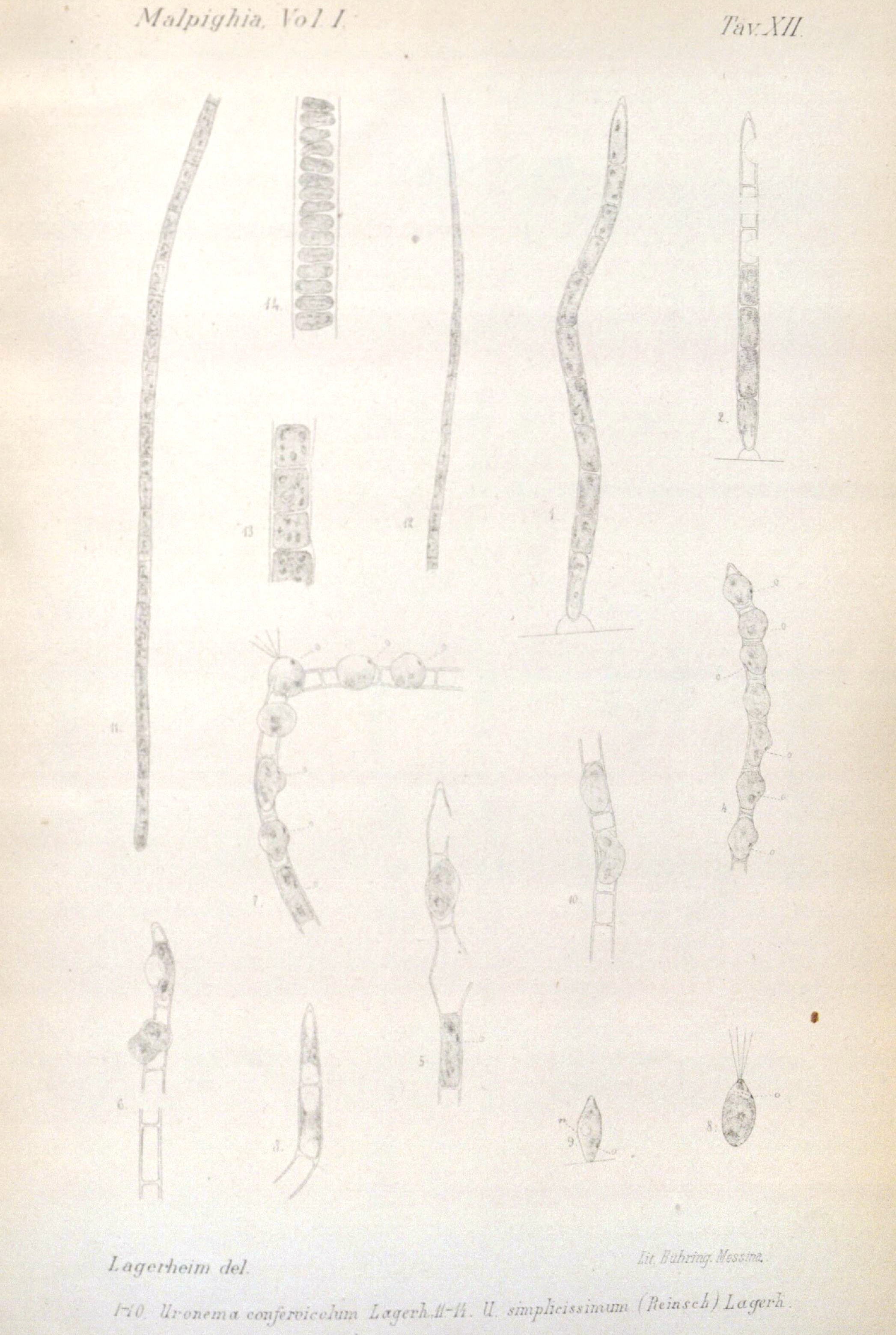

Scientific classification
- Clade: Viridiplantae
- Division: Chlorophyta
- Class: Chlorophyceae
- Order: Chaetophorales
- Family: Uronemataceae; Caisová, Pérez Reyes, Cruz Álamo, Martel Quintana, Surek & Melkonian
- Genus: Uronema; Lagerheim, 1887

Type species
- Uronema confervicola

Species
- Uronema acuminatum; Uronema africanum; Uronema belkiae; Uronema brasiliense; Uronema confervicola; Uronema elongatum; Uronema falcatum; Uronema indicum; Uronema intermedium; Uronema minutum; Uronema simplicissimum; Uronema subelongatum; Uronema trentonense

= Uronema (green alga) =

Genus of algae

Uronema is a genus of green algae, the sole genus in the family Uronemataceae. It is a benthic or epiphytic alga with a cosmopolitan distribution. Filaments of Uronema can occasionally be found in the plankton when they get detached.

Uronema is a freshwater alga. Two marine species formerly considered to be in this genus have been transferred to Okellya.

== Description ==
Uronema consists of unbranched, uniseriate filaments. Filaments are attached to a substrate via gelatinous holdfast, called a "dermoid", secreted by a slightly tapered basal cell. Cells are cylindrical, elongate; the apical cell is pointed. The cell wall is thin and not lamellate. The chloroplast is single, parietal, lobed, encircling most or all of the cell lumen; it typically contains at least one pyrenoid (usually four).

Asexual reproduction occurs via quadriflagellate zoospores or aplanospores. Zoospores are pyriform to ovoid, with a single cup-shaped chloroplast and a stigma.

Uronema is similar to Ulothrix and sometimes considered to be part of the genus; however, it differs by being attached to a substrate and having filaments ending in an acuminate tip. Molecular studies have confirmed its placement in the order Chaetophorales.
