= Pleurastrophyceae =

Class of algae

The Pleurastrophyceae were a formerly recognized class of green algae, in the division Chlorophyta. It was created by Mattox and Stewart in 1984, containing four genera. More recent classifications tend to split the group. On the one hand, Tetraselmis seems to be a sister to the so-called UTC clade (Chlorophyceae, Trebouxiophyceae, and Ulvophyceae), thus making it part of the (paraphyletic) Prasinophyceae. The other three genera were Pleurastrum, Trebouxia, and Pseudotrebouxia, and most of the species which had been in those genera have been placed in the Trebouxiophyceae. However, Pleurastrum insigne, which had been specified as the type of Pleurastrophyceae, turns out to be part of the Chlorophyceae.
