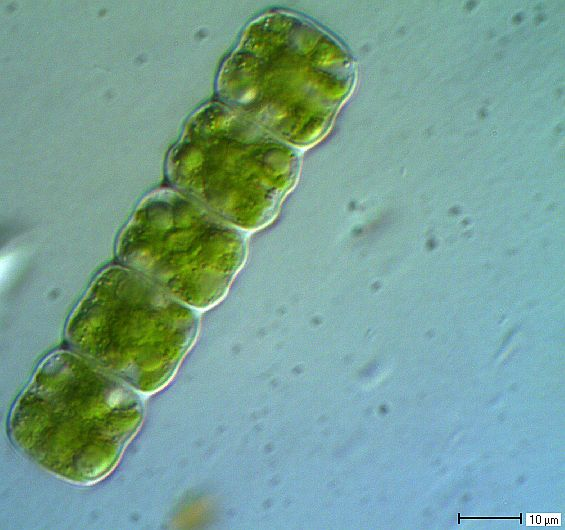

Scientific classification
- Kingdom: Plantae
- Class: Zygnematophyceae
- Order: Desmidiales
- Family: Desmidiaceae
- Genus: Hyalotheca; Ehrenberg ex Ralfs

Type species
- Hyalotheca mucosa Ralfs

Species
- H. dissiliens; H. mucosa

= Hyalotheca =

Genus of algae

Hyalotheca is a genus of green algae, specifically of the Desmidiaceae. It has a cosmopolitan distribution and is found in acidic, oligotrophic freshwater habitats.

Hyalotheca consists of chains of cells joined end-to-end to form filaments, which are surrounded in a thin or thick layer of mucilage. Cells are cylindrical with two identical halves called semicells; the isthmus (where the two semicells join) may be slightly constricted. Some species may have small protuberances near the cell median, making the cells appear somewhat lemon-shaped or triangular in apical view. The cell wall is smooth or with a transverse row of pores. Each semicell has one axial chloroplast, which is stellate in end view, with a central pyrenoid. The nucleus is located in the center of the cell, between the chloroplasts.

Asexual reproduction occurs by binary cell division similar to that of most other desmids, but after division the daughter cells remain attached to each other. Aplanospores are known in two species; during aplanospore formation, the filaments break apart into individual cells, the cytoplasm rounds up and a thick wall is formed. Sexual reproduction occurs by conjugation. In sexual reproduction, filaments come together and break apart into individual cells. Cells line up and form a tube between each other, in which the two gametes become a zygote. The mature zygote is spherical with a smooth, unornamented cell wall.
