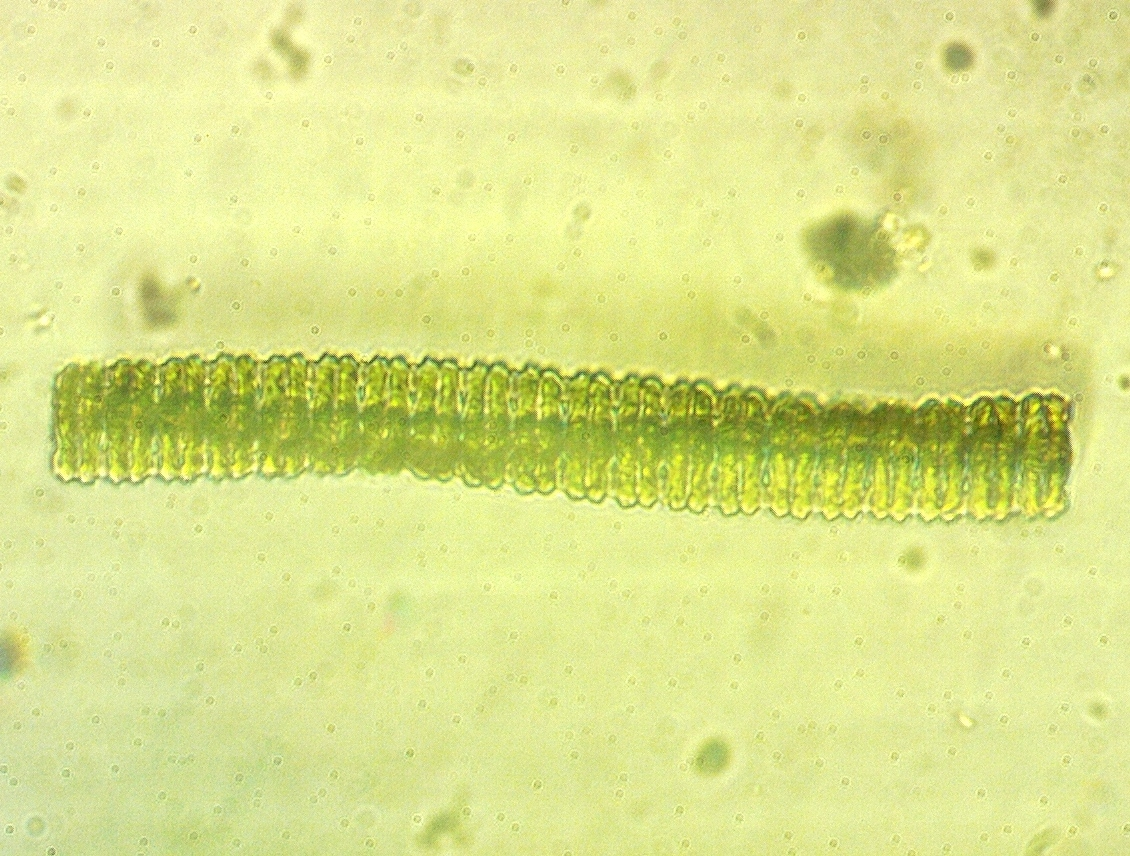
- Desmidium swartzii

Scientific classification
- Kingdom: Plantae
- Class: Zygnematophyceae
- Order: Desmidiales
- Family: Desmidiaceae
- Genus: Desmidium; C.Agardh ex Ralfs

Type species
- Desmidium swartzii C.Agardh ex Ralfs

Species
- D. aptogonum; D. asymmetricum; D. baileyi; D. coarctatum; D. elegans; D. graciliceps; D. grevillei; D. pseudostreptonema; D. suboccidentale; D. swartzii

= Desmidium =

Genus of algae

Desmidium is a genus of green algae, the type genus of the family Desmidiaceae. It has a cosmopolitan distribution in acidic, oligotrophic freshwater lakes and bogs.

The genus name of Desmidium is derived from the Greek word 'desmos' (= ribbon, chain or bond).

Desmidium consists of cells with two halves, called semicells; the cells are attached to each other at their ends, forming filaments. The cells can be longer or shorter than wide, with a median constriction (called an isthmus) where the two semicells join; the isthmus distinct or indistinct. Cells are oval or three- to five-angled in apical view; the apex of each cell is either flat or has a narrow process at each angle; cells are attached to each other by the entire apical surface or by the apical processes. The angles may be offset on each semicell, creating a helical pattern along the filament. Cell walls are smooth and covered with pores. Each semicell contains one stellate chloroplast; the chloroplast may have a single pyrenoid in the middle of the chloroplast, or in each lobe. The nucleus is found in the isthmus.

Asexual reproduction occurs by cell division; daughter cells stick together so that the filament in question increases in length. Sexual reproduction occurs by conjugation. During conjugation, filaments usually break apart and gametes fuse between gametangia. Mature zygospores are spherical to ellipsoid, and may be smooth or with rounded warts.

== Taxonomy ==
Species of Desmidium are distinguished based on cell shape, number of angles, and size of the apical processes. Some taxonomists recognize a separate genus, Didymoprium. In this classification, Didymoprium consists of species with cells that are ellipsoid in apical view and the chloroplast is stellate with broad, undissected lobes; Desmidium sensu stricto consists of species with cells that are angular in apical view and with furcate chloroplast lobes.
