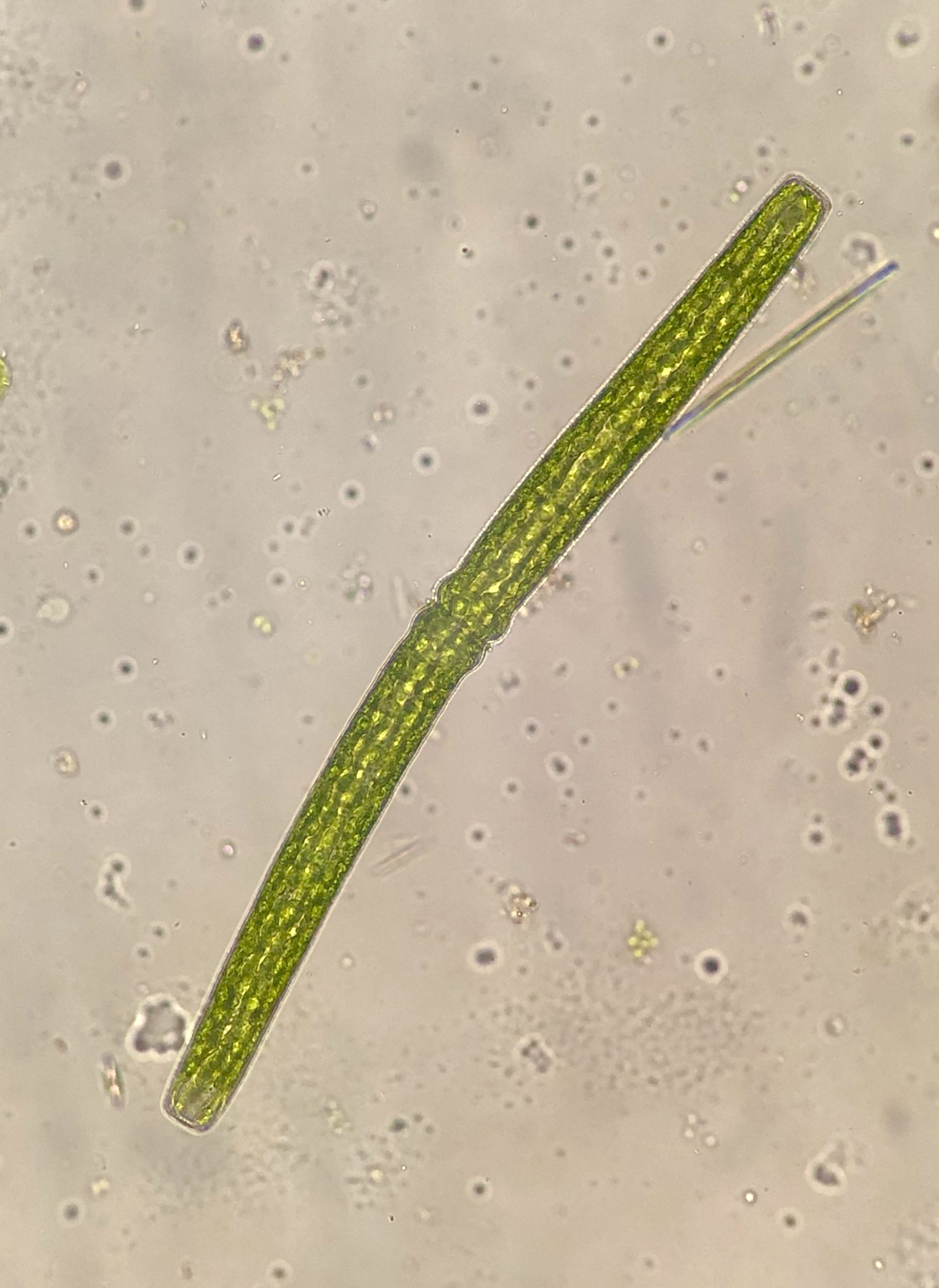

Scientific classification
- Kingdom: Plantae
- Class: Zygnematophyceae
- Order: Desmidiales
- Family: Desmidiaceae
- Genus: Pleurotaenium; Nägeli

Type species
- Pleurotaenium trabecula Nägeli

Species
- P. archeri; P. coronatum; P. ehrenbergii; P. kayei; P. ovatum; P. nodosum; P. trabecula; P. truncatum; P. verrucosum

= Pleurotaenium =

Genus of algae

Pleurotaenium is a genus of green algae, specifically of the desmids (Desmidiaceae). It is a cosmopolitan genus, with about 50 species. Members of Pleurotaenium are found in freshwater habitats, and may be found in acidic, neutral or alkaline waters.

== Description ==
Pleurotaenium consists of long, cylindrical, bilaterally symmetrical cells with blunt ends; they are typically solitary, but occasionally joined end-to-end to form filaments. There is a shallow median constriction (an isthmus), where the two halves (called semicells) of the cells are joined. Semicells are widened at the base and truncate at the apex. At each apex, there is a vacuole filled with small granules. The cell wall is covered in fine pores, and may have mammillate protuberances, or spines. Cells have multiple chloroplasts, which are parietal bands from base to apex; these typically have several pyrenoids. The nucleus is at the isthmus.

Cells typically reproduce asexually, where the cell divides along the isthmus and new semicells grow from the two halves.

Sexual reproduction occurs via conjugation (transmission of DNA through nucleus fusion to form a hypnozygote or zygospore, which is a term for a zygote that lies dormant until optimal conditions arise), and may be homothallic or heterothallic.

== Taxonomy ==
Pleurotaenium is similar to Docidium, although Docidium has an axile chloroplast and ribs/granules around the base of the semicell, near the isthmus. The genus Haplotaenium was split off from Pleurotaenium; Haplotaenium has a single, axile chloroplast and lacks terminal vacuoles.

Species are distinguished based on morphological characters such as the ornamentation of the cell wall, shape of the apex, and width of the cells; however, Pleurotaenium species delimitation has been difficult because of the large range of variability between individuals.

Molecular phylogenetic studies show that Pleurotaenium is monophyletic; however, common morphologically defined species such as P. trabecula and P. ehrenbergii are not.
