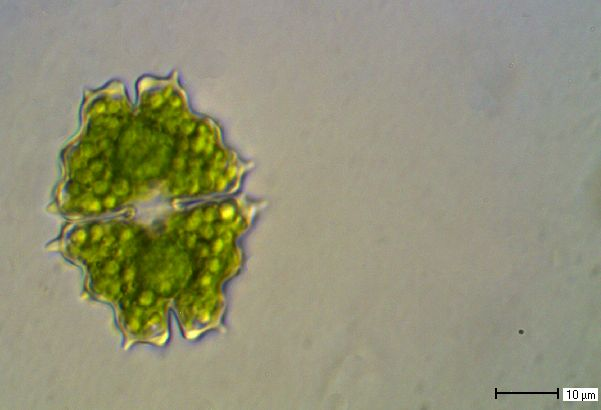
- Euastrum divaricatum

Scientific classification
- Kingdom: Plantae
- Class: Zygnematophyceae
- Order: Desmidiales
- Family: Desmidiaceae
- Genus: Euastrum

Species
- E. oblongum; E. pectinatum; E. pinnatum; (many more)

= Euastrum =

Genus of algae

Euastrum is a genus of green algae of the Desmidiaceae family. It lives in acidic waters.

== Description ==
It is made of two, symmetrical semicells. They are usually longer than wide and are wavy and lobed. On the ends of the semicells, there is a notch. The cell wall may have "protuberances;" however, they are hard to see.
