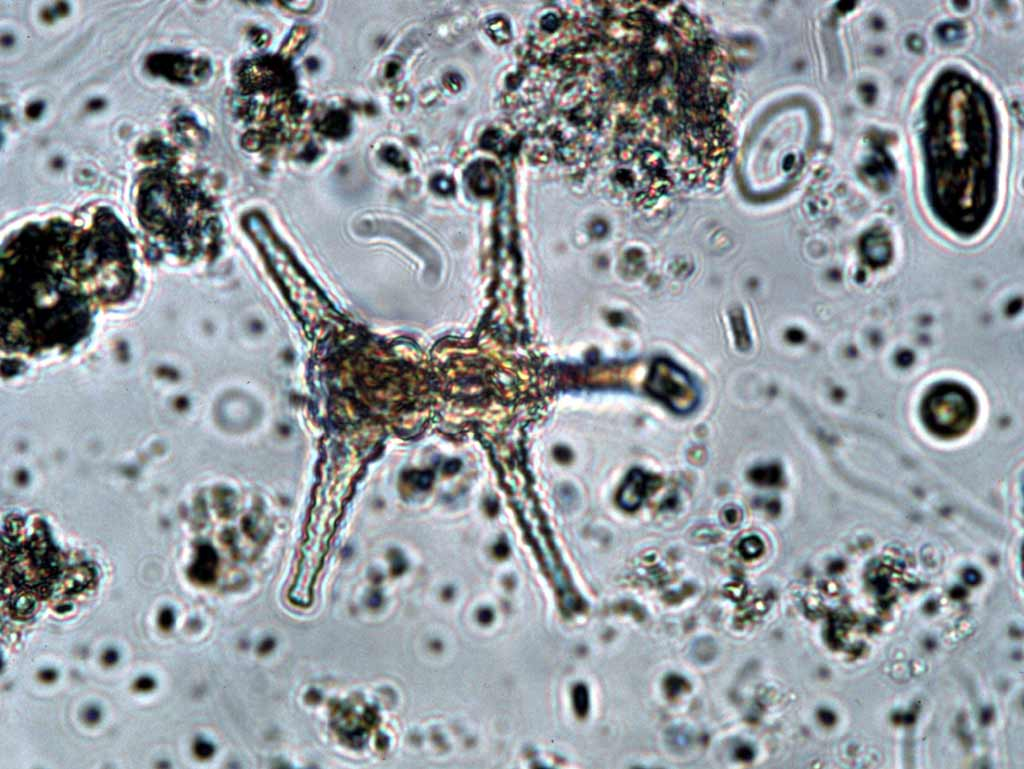
- Staurastrum paradoxum

Scientific classification
- Kingdom: Plantae
- Class: Zygnematophyceae
- Order: Desmidiales
- Family: Desmidiaceae
- Genus: Staurastrum; Meyen ex Ralfs

Type species
- Staurastrum paradoxum Meyen ex Ralfs

Species
- See text.

= Staurastrum =

Genus of algae

Staurastrum is a large genus of desmids (Desmidiaceae), a group of green algae closely related to the land plants (Embryophyta). Members of this genus are microscopic and found in freshwater habitats around the world.

The name Staurastrum comes from the Greek roots stauron, meaning "cross", and astron, meaning "star".

== Description ==
Staurastrum consists of singular cells with two identical halves, called semicells; in most species, the cell is deeply constricted at the middle, making the division between semicells clear. When viewed from the polar axis, they are biradiate (with two planes of symmetry) or pluriradiate (with more than two planes of symmetry). Biradiate individuals have long, arm-shaped extensions (termed "processes") attached to the main body of the semicells. Pluriradiate individuals may lack these processes. The cell wall is either smooth, or covered with granules or spines. In each semicell there is a chloroplast, usually located axially, with radiating lobes and/or ridges; some species have parietally located chloroplasts.

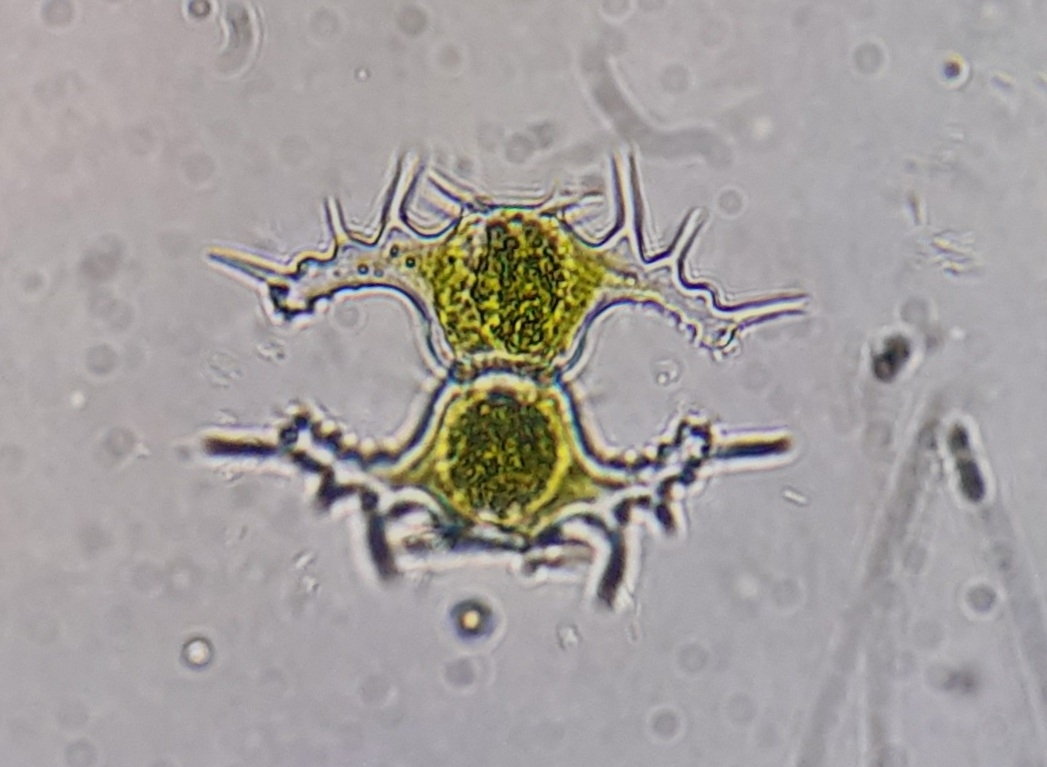
Staurastrum saltans, a biradiate species

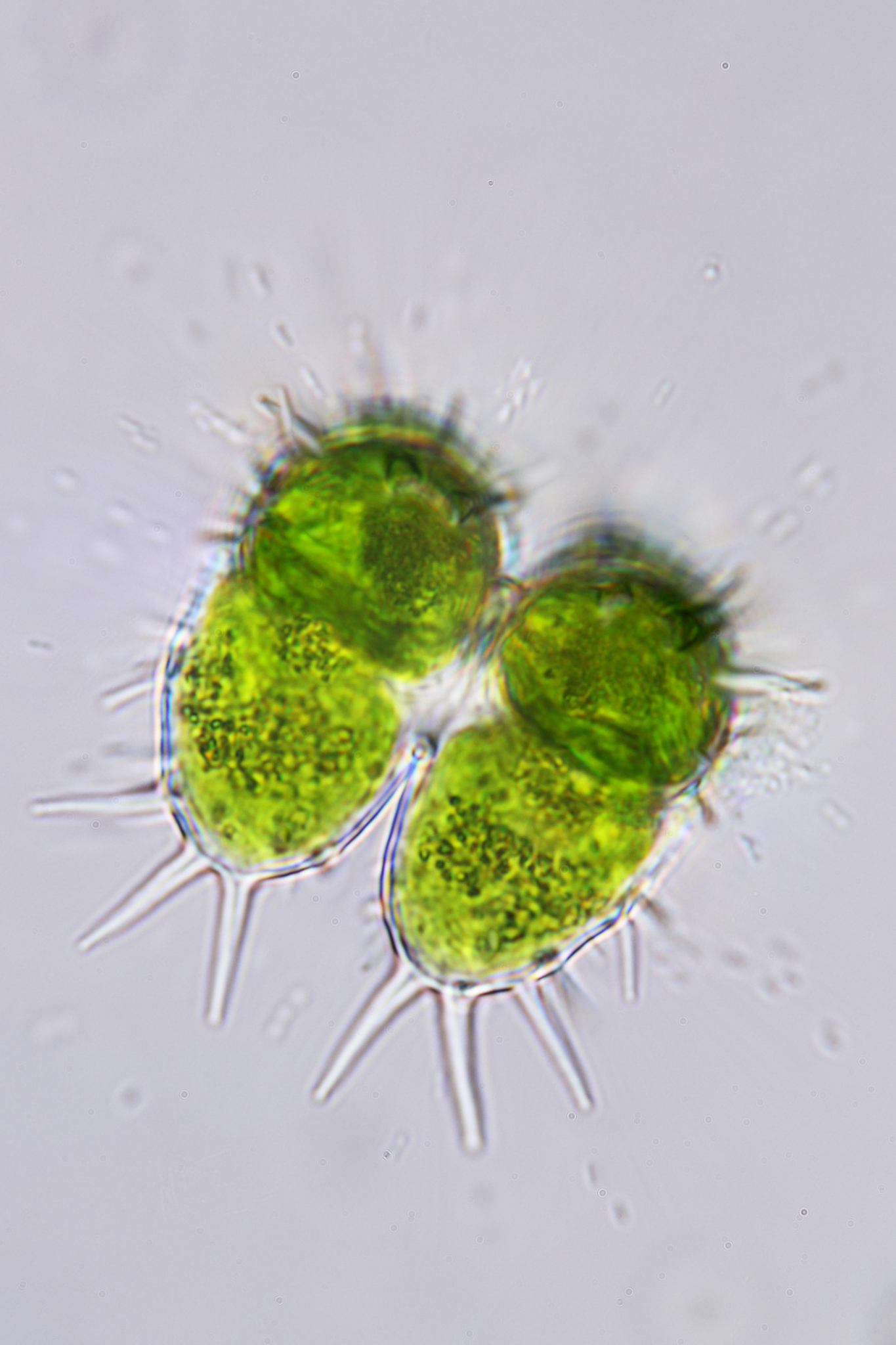
Staurastrum hystrix, a triradiate species

=== Identification ===
Staurastrum as a genus is usually easy to identify, due to its long processes and symmetry. Some smaller species, particularly those without long processes, can be confused with Cosmarium, but that genus has biradiate (not pluriradiate) cells and never with long processes. The smaller species may also be confused with Tetraedron or various xanthophyte algae, but differ in shape, ornamentation, and chloroplast morphology.

Although some species of Staurastrum are unmistakable, identification of species within the genus is often difficult. Important characters for identification include the degree of radiation (the number of planes of symmetry), overall shape and size of the cells, and the distribution and type of ornamentation on the cell wall. As with other genera of desmids, identification is complicated by the fact that these algae exhibit considerable phenotypic variability.

== Taxonomy ==
Staurastrum is the second largest genus of desmids (after Cosmarium), with about 800 species. It is the most heterogeneous desmid genus, and has been described as a wastebin taxon. Several attempts have been made to dismantle the genus and split it up into smaller, more homogeneous units, such as G. M. Palamar-Mordvintseva's segregate genera Cylindriastrum, Cosmoastrum, and Raphidiastrum. These attempts have not been widely accepted, because they are also arbitrary.

Staurastrum is not monophyletic, as molecular phylogenetic studies have shown that members of the genus are dispersed across many clades; however, a "core" Staurastrum clade was resolved. The genus is still in use, because there is no known way of classifying desmids in line with their evolutionary history.

== Habitat and distribution ==
Staurastrum, as well as other desmid genera, live primarily in acidic lakes, ponds, and swamps with low nutrient levels. They usually live on sediments or submerged surfaces. A number of species are characteristic of eutrophic waters and are planktonic.

Many species have a cosmopolitan distribution. However, some species are restricted to a particular biogeographic realm.

== Species ==
- S. affine
- S. alternans
- S. arctiscon
- S. asteroideum
- S. avicula
- S. brachiatum
- S. brachycerum
- S. brebissonii
- S. capitulum
- S. cerastes
- S. clepsydra
- S. crenulatum
- S. cristatum
- S. cyclacanthum
- S. dejectum
- S. dickiei
- S. dilatatum
- S. dispar
- S. galeatum
- S. gemelliparum
- S. gracile
- S. hantzschii
- S. hexacerum
- S. hirsutum
- S. iotanum
- S. isthmosum
- S. javanicum
- S. laeve
- S. lapponicum
- S. lunatum
- S. maamense
- S. majusculum
- S. margaritaceum
- S. monticulosum
- S. muticum
- S. natator
- S. omaerii
- S. ophiura
- S. orbiculare
- S. paradoxum
- S. pingue
- S. polymorphum
- S. pseudotetracerum
- S. punctulatum
- S. pyramidatum
- S. quadricornutum
- S. sebaldi
- S. simonyi
- S. sp. BBM-2004
- S. sp. desmid10
- S. sp. M752
- S. sp. M753
- S. spongiosum
- S. subavicula
- S. subgemmulatum
- S. thunmarkii
- S. tumidum
