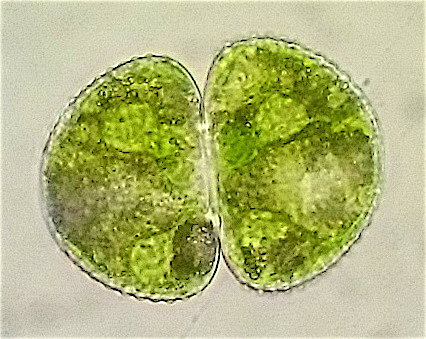
- Cosmarium botrytis

Scientific classification
- Kingdom: Plantae
- Class: Zygnematophyceae
- Order: Desmidiales
- Family: Desmidiaceae
- Genus: Cosmarium; Corda ex Ralfs

Type species
- Cosmarium undulatum Corda ex Ralfs

Species
- C. angulosum; C. auriculatum; C. bioculatum; C. bisphaericum; C. blyttii; C. borgesenii; C. botrytis; C. contractum; C. costatum; C. cucumis; C. debaryi; C. dentatum; C. depressum; C. dilatatum; C. elegantissimum; C. exiguum; C. fontarabiense; C. fontrabiense; C. formosulum; C. furcatospermum; C. granatum; C. hammeri; C. humile; C. impressulum; C. isthmium; C. laeve; C. levinotabile; C. lundellii; C. norimbergense; C. obsoletum; C. obtusatum; C. ovale; C. pachydermum; C. pseudoconnatum; C. quadrum; C. rectangulare; C. reniforme; C. sexangulare; C. sp. ACKU 1232; C. subcostatum; C. subcucumis; C. subprotumidum; C. subtumidum; C. succisum; C. tenue; C. tetragonum; C. trilobulatum; C. tumidum; C. undulatum

= Cosmarium =

Genus of algae

Cosmarium is a large genus of desmids (Desmidiaceae), a group of green algae closely related to the land plants (Embryophyta). Members of this genus are microscopic and found in freshwater habitats around the world.

The name Cosmarium comes from the Greek word κοσμάριον - kosmarion, meaning a small ornament.

== Description ==
Cosmarium, with few exceptions, consists of single cells and is thus microscopic. Cells are constricted in the middle, giving them a bilobed appearance; the two halves are called semicells. Cells come in a variety of different shapes. The cell wall may be smooth or ornamented with spines, granules, scrobiculations (pits), or pores. Cells are generally flattened. Cells usually have one or two chloroplasts filling the cell; each chloroplast contains pyrenoids, typically one or two.

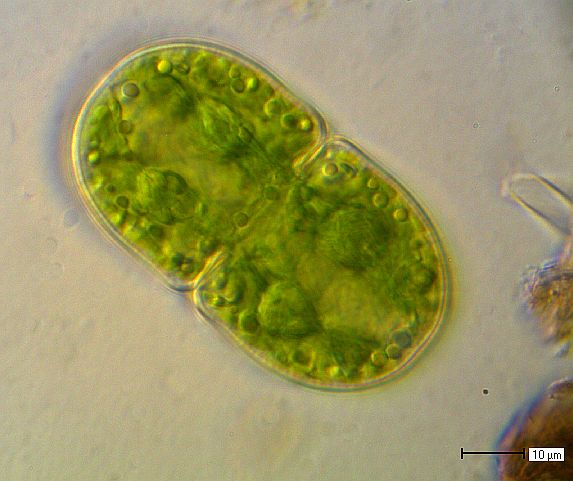
Cosmarium quadratum, with a smooth cell wall

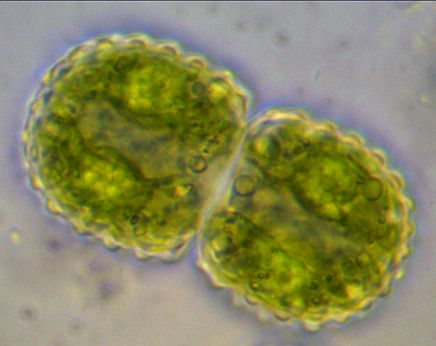
Cosmarium pseudamoenum, with a granulated cell wall

=== Identification ===
Species identification of Cosmarium depends on the shape of the cells and their ornamentation, and can be difficult. In addition, the genera Actinotaenium and Euastrum can be similar to various species of Cosmarium. Actinotaenium is generally circular in cross section, and Euastrum usually (but not always) has a notch at the tip of each semicell.

== Taxonomy ==
Cosmarium is the largest genus of desmids, with over 1,000 species. It is an artificial genus: the defining characteristics of the genus are vague and arbitrary, and there are some species that are intermediate between several different genera. For this reason, it has been called a wastebasket taxon. It is also not monophyletic, as molecular phylogenetic studies have shown that the form of Cosmarium evolved independently many times over. Despite this, the genus is still in use, because there is no known way of classifying desmids in line with their evolutionary history.

== Habitat ==
Cosmarium and other desmid genera tend to prefer oligotrophic, somewhat acidic water habitats, but some species exist in more eutrophic and/or basic habitats. Some species, which are small and mostly plain, form a community known as a "Cosmarietum"; these may be further associated with a community of Closterium species forming a Cosmarietum-Closterietum association.
