= John Ralfs =

British botanist (1807–1890)

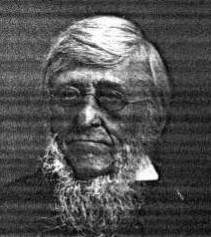
- Born: 13 September 1807; Millbrook, Hampshire, England
- Died: 14 July 1890 (aged 82); Penzance, Cornwall
- Education: Winchester Hospital
- Known for: Desmids
- Scientific career
- Fields: Botany
- Author abbrev. (botany): Ralfs

John Ralfs (13 September 1807 – 14 July 1890) was an English botanist. Born in Millbrook, Hampshire, near Southampton, he was the second son of Samuel Ralfs, a yeoman of an old family in Hampshire. He has been commemorated in the names of many plant groups and taxa at many levels.

== Early life and education ==
Ralfs's father died at Mudeford near Christchurch before John was a year old, and the children (two sons and two daughters) were brought up at Southampton by their mother. After being educated privately he was articled to his uncle, a surgeon of Brentford, with whom he lived for two years and a half. For two years he was a pupil at Winchester Hospital, and in 1832 he passed his final examination, being specially recommended by the examiners for his knowledge of botany. For some time he practised in partnership with another surgeon at Shoreditch, and he is also said to have practised at Towcester.

At Torquay, where he moved on account of lung disease (probably tubercular in origin), he married, in 1835, Laura Cecilia, daughter of Henry Newman. In November 1837, for the sake of the mild climate, he settled at Penzance, and, having abandoned his profession, dwelt there for the rest of his life. Ralfs marriage proved unhappy. Within two years from their union his wife joined her parents in France. She died in 1848, at the chateau of the Count and Countess of Morambert in the Dordogne. Ralfs visited the chateau in 1850, and took the opportunity of seeing the chief botanists in Paris.

== Financial troubles ==
Through the misconduct of a near relative, who betrayed his trust, Ralfs lost most of his fortune; but under the will of his friend, the Rev. Henry Penneck, who died in 1862, he enjoyed a small annuity. Joseph Dalton Hooker and Thomas Henry Huxley, with the Philosophical Club of the Royal Society, set up a charitable collection to provide Ralfs with an annuity — the appeal was so successful that in addition to providing Ralfs with an income, a fund for the "relief of necessitas [sic] Scientific Men" was also established. Charles Darwin was one of the notable scientists who subscribed.

== Death ==
In spite of ill-health and failing eyesight, he actively pursued botanical researches until he was seventy-five years old. He was long a member of the committee of the Penzance library, catalogued its books and prepared its printed catalogue, as well as being responsible for the purchase of much of its natural history stock. In his final four or five years he suffered with hearing problems and ″bodily weakness″, which kept him at home. He also suffered from dementia, which was described as a second childhood in the obituary in his local newspaper. He died at 15 St Clare Street, Penzance, on 14 July 1890, and was buried in St Clare cemetery, where a monument was erected to his memory by the members of the Penzance Natural History and Antiquarian Society, of which body he was a vice-president after its resuscitation in 1880, and president for 1883–4.

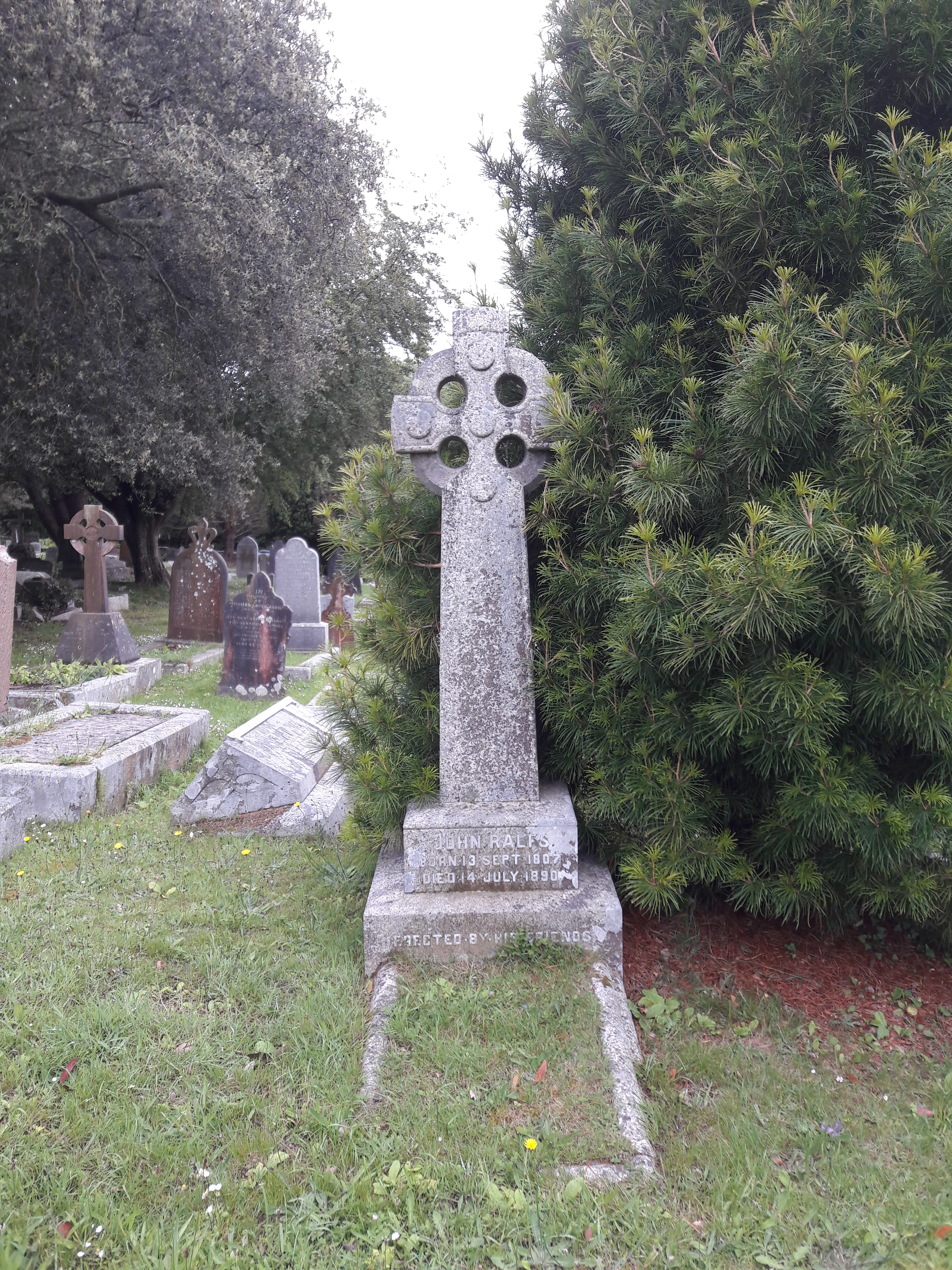
Memorial in St Clare Cemetery, Penzance

He left his collections of microscopic slides, 3,137 in all, to the botanical department of the British Museum, but as the will had not been witnessed, it did not take legal effect. The botanist's only son, however, Mr John Henry Ralfs, carried out his father's intentions.

== Works ==
The works of Ralfs were: British Phænogamous Plants and Ferns, 1839, and The British Desmidieæ, 1848. This volume is ‘unsurpassed for the beauty and accuracy of its coloured plates,’ and original editions are very rare and costly. His first paper, on Desmids and Diatoms, was contributed, at the suggestion of the Rev. Miles Joseph Berkeley, to the Edinburgh Botanical Society, and for many years his articles appeared in its Transactions and in the Annals of Natural History. Hundreds of his letters are among Berkeley's correspondence in the botanical department of the British Museum. In the Penzance library are deposited his manuscript collections, viz., Flora of West Cornwall, 1878–86, 8 vols.; Flora of the Scilly Isles, 1876, 1 vol., and Fungi of West Cornwall, 1880–6, 2 vols. Ralf was the editor of the exsiccata work British Algae, dried specimens of marine and freshwater algae, including the Desmidieae and Diatomaceae (c. 1830).

Ralfs was elected an Honorary Fellow of the Royal Microscopical Society in 1889, and was offered, but declined, associateship of the Linnean Society.

== Correspondence & collaboration with other scientists ==
Arthur Hill Hassall long corresponded with Ralfs, who suggested that they should render each other assistance in their inquiries. But when Hassall's British Freshwater Algæ, including Descriptions of the Desmideæ and Diatomaceæ, which, in Ralfs's opinion, ought to have been published jointly, appeared in 1845, no mention was made of Ralfs. The History of Infusoria, by Andrew Pritchard, was enlarged and revised by Ralfs and other botanists. His contribution on the diatomaceæ was condensed by Pritchard (pp. 756–940).

Ralfs aided in the botanical portions of the Guide to Ilfracombe, 1838; the Guide to Penzance, by J. S. Courtney, 1845; the Week at the Land's End, by John Thomas Blight, 1861; the Official Guide to Penzance, 1876, and he supplied the list of desmids to Jenner's Flora of Tunbridge Wells. He sent many plants for description in the second edition of English Botany by Sir James Edward Smith. Berkeley gave the name of Ralfsia to a genus of seaweeds, and Wilson named a Jungermannia in his honour. Charles Darwin in his Insectivorous Plants gracefully referred to those supplied to him by Ralfs from the neighbourhood of Penzance.
