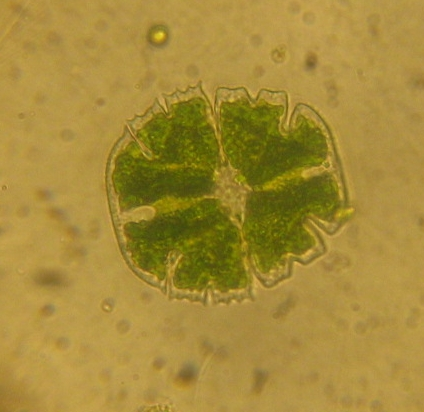
- Micrasterias sp.

Scientific classification
- Kingdom: Plantae
- Class: Zygnematophyceae
- Order: Desmidiales
- Family: Desmidiaceae; Ralfs

Genera
- See text

= Desmidiaceae =

Family of algae

The Desmidiaceae are one of four families of charophyte green algae in the order Desmidiales (desmids). Desmids in the family Desmidiaceae consist of single-celled (sometimes filamentous or colonial), microscopic green algae. Because they are highly symmetrical, attractive, and come in a diversity of forms, they are popular subjects for microscopists, both amateur and professional.

Within the desmids (Desmidiales), Desmidiaceae contains tens of genera and thousands of species, making it by far the largest family. Desmidiaceae includes some of the largest and most complex desmid genera, such as Micrasterias, Cosmarium, Staurastrum, and Euastrum.

== Description ==
Desmids are single-celled (sometimes filamentous or colonial) algae, which are generally constricted in the middle, having two identical halves called semicells. The cell wall also consists of two halves. In apical view, the cells may be compressed (biradiate), three- or multi-angular (tri- or multiradiate), or circular (omniradiate). The cell wall is marked by having pores which penetrate all cell wall layers and contain a mucilaginous plug (called the pore fields). In addition to having pores, the cell wall may be covered in spines, pits ("scrobicles" or "scrobiculae"), lobes, or granules. Chloroplasts are axial or parietal.

== Genera ==
Within the family Desmidiaceae, genera are delimited based on morphological characters such as the symmetry of the cells; whether the cells are solitary, filamentous, or colonial; the presence or absence of long processes or extensions; and the shape of the chloroplasts. However, most of these characters are highly homoplasious; therefore, many or even most genera are artificial and para- or polyphyletic.

Genera accepted by AlgaeBase as of April 2025 were:

- Actinodontum Alfinito & Coesel – 3 species
- Actinotaenium (Nägeli) Teiling – 66 species
- Allorgeia Gauthier-Lièvre ex Guiry & Coesel – 2 species
- Amscottia Grönblad – 2 species
- Bambusina Kützing ex Kützing – 8 species
- Bourellyodesmus Compère – 10 species
- Brachytheca Gontcharov & Watanabe – 2 species
- †Closterimopsis L.M.Yin & Zai P.Li – 1 species
- Cosmarium Corda ex Ralfs – 1206 species
- Cosmocladium Brébisson – 8 species
- Croasdalea C.E.M.Bicudo & Mercante – 1 species
- Cruciangulum D.B.Williamson – 1 species
- Desmidium C.Agardh ex Ralfs – 25 species
- †Desmidopsis L.M.Yin & Zai P.Li – 1 species
- Docidium Brébisson ex Ralfs – 22 species
- Euastridium West & G.S.West – 3 species
- Euastrum Ehrenberg ex Ralfs – 358 species
- Groenbladia Teiling – 6 species
- Haplotaenium Bando – 4 species
- Heimansia Coesel – 2 species
- Hyalotheca Ehrenberg ex Ralfs – 14 species
- Ichthyocercus West & G.S.West – 6 species
- Ichthyodontum A.M.Scott & Prescott – 1 species
- Mateola R.Salisbury – 1 species
- Micrasterias C.Agardh ex Ralfs – 100 species
- Onychonema Wallich – 1 species
- Oocardium Nägeli – 3 species
- Pachyphorium Palamar-Mordintseva – 1 species
- Phymatodocis Nordstedt – 3 species
- Pleurotaeniopsis (P.Lundell) Lagerheim – 1 species
- Pleurotaenium Nägeli – 89 species
- Prescottiella C.E.M.Bicudo – 1 species
- Pseudomicrasterias C.B.Araújo, C.E.M.Bicudo, Stastny & Skaloud – 2 species
- Sphaerozosma Corda ex Ralfs – 20 species
- Spinocosmarium Prescott & A.M.Scott – 2 species
- Spondylosium Brébisson ex Kützing – 33 species
- Staurastrum Meyen ex Ralfs – 788 species
- Staurodesmus Teiling – 87 species
- Streptonema Wallich – 3 species
- Teilingia Bourrelly – 9 species
- Tetmemorus Ralfs ex Ralfs – 10 species
- Triplastrum M.O.P.Iyengar & Ramanathan – 3 species
- Triploceras Bailey – 3 species
- Vincularia K.Fuciková & J.Kastovsky – 1 species
- Xanthidium Ehrenberg ex Ralfs – 128 species
