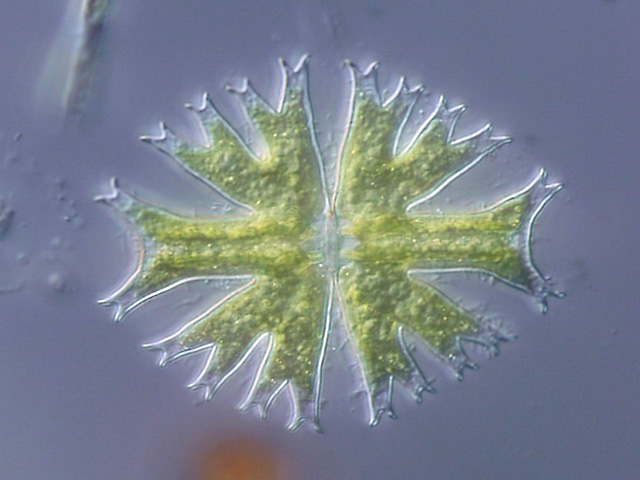
- Micrasterias furcata

Scientific classification
- Kingdom: Plantae
- Class: Zygnematophyceae
- Order: Desmidiales; Bessey

Families
- Closteriaceae; Desmidiaceae; Gonatozygaceae; Peniaceae

= Desmidiales =

Desmids

Order of algae

Desmidiales, commonly called the desmids (Gr. desmos, bond or chain), are an order in the Charophyta, a division of green algae in which the land plants (Embryophyta) emerged. Desmids consist of single-celled (sometimes filamentous or colonial) microscopic green algae. Because desmids are highly symmetrical, attractive, and come in a diversity of forms, they are popular subjects for microscopists, both amateur and professional.

The desmids belong to the class Zygnematophyceae. Although they are sometimes grouped together as a single family Desmidiaceae, most classifications recognize three to five families, usually within their own order, Desmidiales.

The Desmidiales comprise around 40 genera and 5,000 to 6,000 species, found mostly but not exclusively in fresh water. In general, desmids prefer acidic waters (pH between 4.8 and 7.0), so many species may be found in the fissures between patches of sphagnum moss in marshes. As desmids are sensitive to changes in their environments, they are useful as bioindicators for water and habitat quality.

== Nomenclature ==
The term "desmid" typically refers to a group of microscopic, mostly single-celled algae in the class Zygnematophyceae. Within the desmids, a distinction is typically made between "saccoderm" and "placoderm" desmids. Saccoderm desmids, corresponding to the family Mesotaeniaceae in the order Zygnematales, consist of cells that are unconstricted at the middle, lack median suture lines, and do not have mucilage-secreting pores in the cell wall. Meanwhile, placoderm desmids, corresponding to the order Desmidiales, consist of cells with two symmetrical halves, and mucilage-secreting pores in the cell wall. Here, the term "desmids" and "placoderm desmids" will be used interchangeably to refer to the Desmidiales.

== Morphology ==
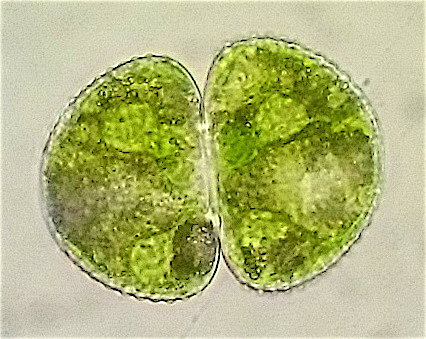
Cosmarium botrytis, a single-celled desmid

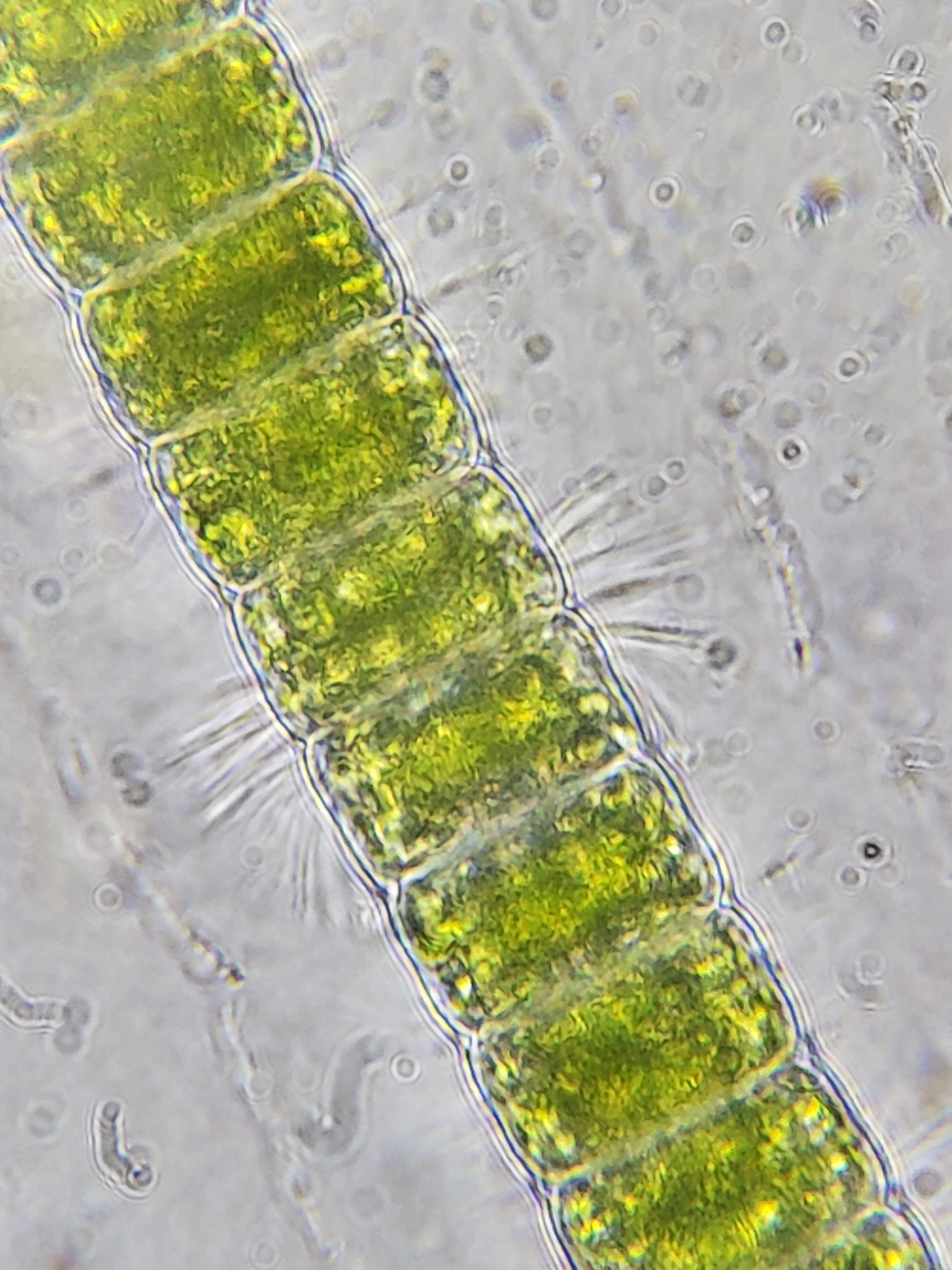
Hyalotheca dissiliens, a filamentous desmid surrounded by mucilage

The structure of these algae is unicellular, and lacks flagella. Although most desmid species are unicellular, some genera form chains of cells, called filaments. A few genera form non-filamentous colonies, with individual cells connected by threads or remnants of parent cell walls.

The cell of a desmid is often divided into two symmetrical compartments separated by a narrow bridge or isthmus, wherein the spherical nucleus is located. Each semi-cell houses a large, often folded chloroplast for photosynthesizing. One or more pyrenoids can be found. These form carbohydrates for energy storage. The cell-wall, of two halves (termed semicells), which, in a few species of Closterium and Penium, are of more than one piece, has two distinct layers, the inner composed mainly of cellulose, the outer is stronger and thicker, often furnished with spines, granules, warts et cetera. It is made up of a base of cellulose impregnated with other substances including iron compounds, which are especially prominent in some species of Closterium and Penium and is not soluble in an ammoniacal solution of copper oxide.

Desmids assume a variety of highly symmetrical and generally attractive shapes, among those elongated, star-shaped and rotund configurations, which provide the basis for their classification. The largest among them may be visible to the unaided eye.

Desmids possess characteristic crystals of barium sulphate at either end of the cell which exhibit continuous Brownian motion. The function of these crystals is completely unknown.

Many desmids also secrete translucent, gelatinous mucilage from pores in the cell wall that acts as a protecting agent. These pores are either, as in Micrasterias, uniformly distributed across the cell-wall but always appear to be absent in the region of the isthmus, or, in highly ornamented forms, as many genera of Cosmarium, grouped symmetrically around the bases of the spines, warts and so on with which the cell is provided.

In the inner layer of the wall the pore is a simple canal, but in the outer, except in Closterium, the canal is surrounded by a specially differentiated cylindrical zone, not composed of cellulose, through which the canal passes. This is termed the pore-organ. The canals are no doubt in all cases occupied by threads of mucilage in process of excretion. At the inner surface of the wall they terminate in lens- or button-shaped swellings, while from the outer end of the pore-organ there sometimes arise delicate radiating or club-shaped masses of mucilage through which the canal passes and which appear to be more or less permanent in character. In most cases, however, these are absent or only represented by small perforated buttons.

== Reproduction ==
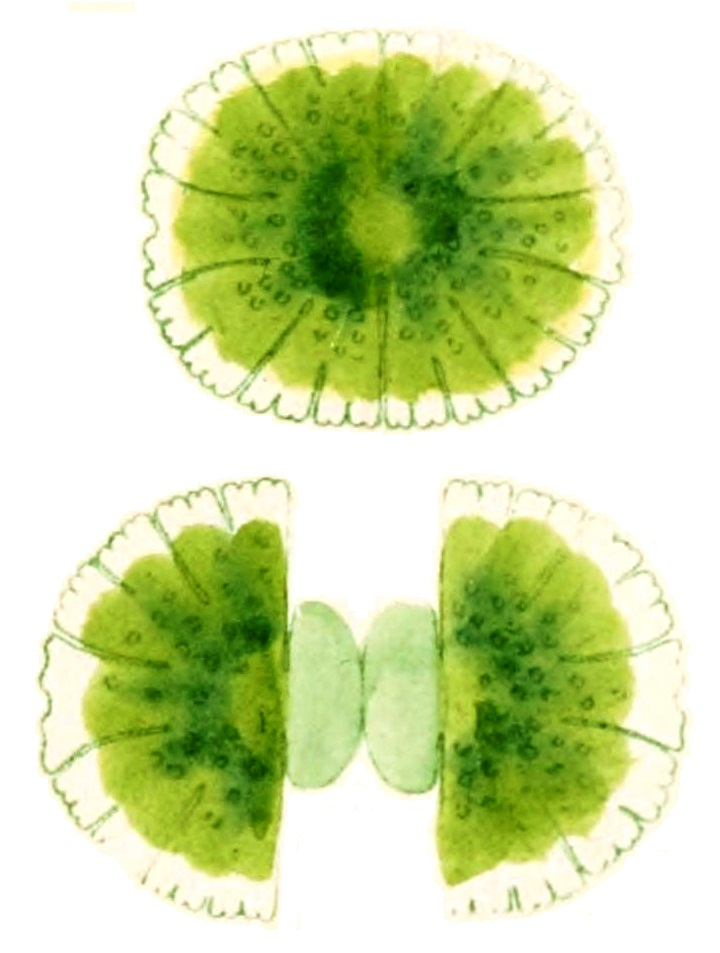
Micrasterias denticulata. Top: a mature vegetative cell. Bottom: a cell undergoing asexual reproduction.

Desmids most commonly reproduce by asexual fission. During cell division, the two halves of a cell separate, and each half develops into a new cell. After division, a cell may be asymmetric since the recently formed half is smaller than the original half.

In adverse conditions, desmids may reproduce sexually through a process of conjugation, which are also found among other closely related taxa in the Zygnematophyceae. Sexual reproduction is rare, and many species have never been observed sexually reproducing.

== Classification ==
Classification of the families and genera in the Desmidiales:

- Closteriaceae
  - Closterium
  - Spinoclosterium
- Gonatozygaceae
  - Genicularina
  - Gonatozygon
  - Leptocystinema
- Peniaceae
  - Penium
- Desmidiaceae
  - Actinodontum
  - Actinotaenium
  - Allorgeia
  - Amscottia
  - Bambusina
  - Bourrellyodesmus
  - Brachytheca
  - Calocylindrus
  - Cosmaridium
  - Cosmarium
  - Cosmocladium
  - Croasdalea
  - Cruciangulum
  - Desmidium
  - Docidium
  - Euastridium
  - Euastrum
  - Groenbladia
  - Haplotaenium
  - Heimansia
  - Hyalotheca
  - Ichthyocercus
  - Ichthyodontum
- Mateola
- Micrasterias
- Onychonema
- Oocardium
- Pachyphorium
- Phymatodocis
- Pleurotaeniopsis
- Pleurotaenium
- Prescottiella
- Pseudomicrasterias
- Sphaerozosma
- Spinocosmarium
- Spondylosium
- Staurastrum
- Staurodesmus
- Streptonema
- Teilingia
- Tetmemorus
- Trapezodesmus
- Triplastrum
- Triploceras
- Vincularia
- Xanthidium

The family Gonatozygaceae is sometimes included within the Peniaceae, reducing the number of families from four to three. A fifth family Mesotaeniaceae was formerly included in the Desmidiales, but analysis of cell wall structure and DNA sequences show that the group is more closely related to the Zygnemataceae, and so is now placed together with that family in the order Zygnematales. However, the Zygnemataceae may have emerged in the Mesotaeniaceae.

== Habitat and distribution ==
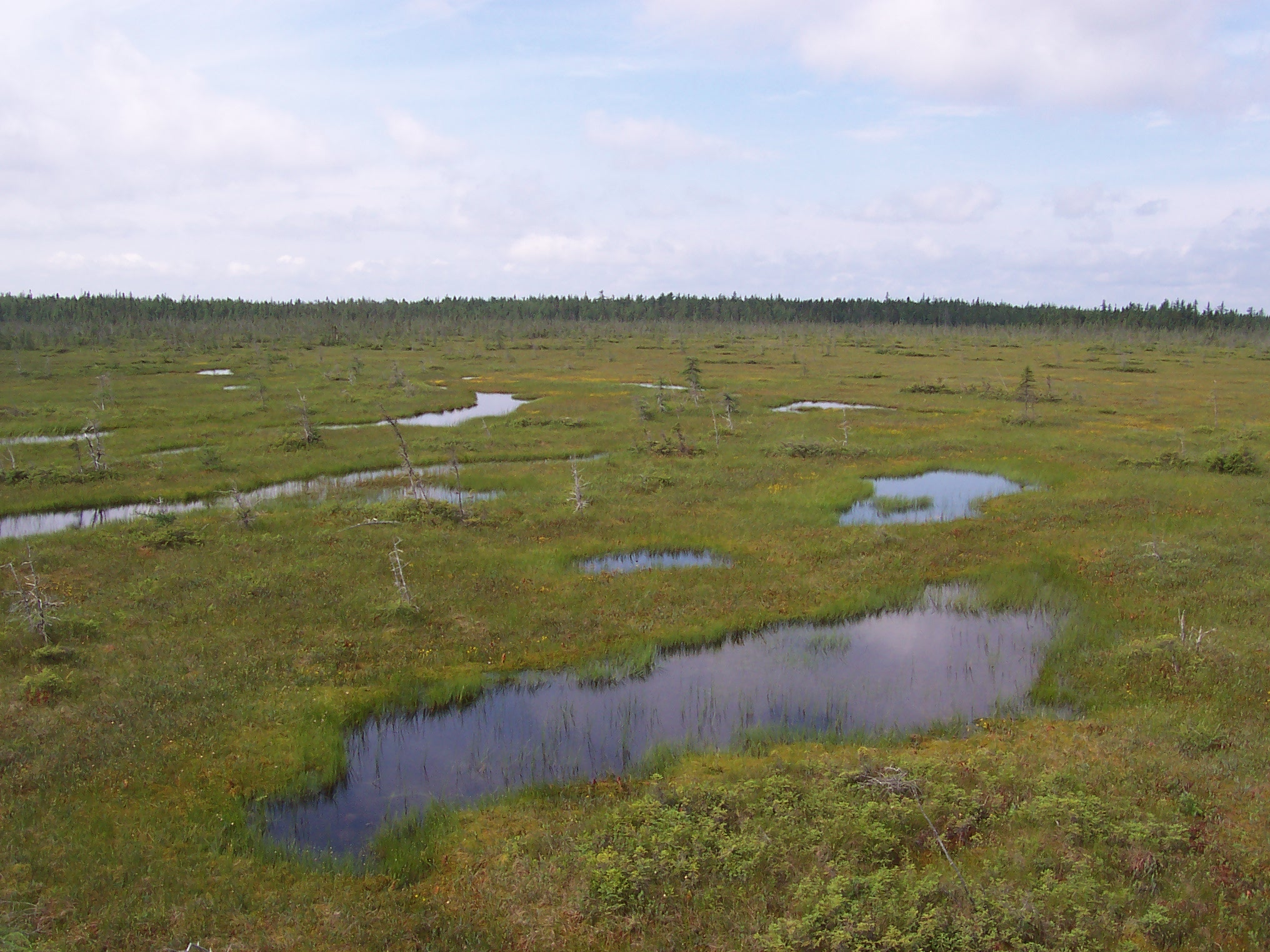
A sphagnum bog in Frontenac National Park, Québec, Canada

Desmids are found in freshwater habitats all over the world, but strongly prefer bogs, mires, and other nutrient-poor wetlands. They generally have strict ecological requirements: most species prefer waters with low amounts of dissolved calcium and magnesium, low salinity levels, and somewhat acidic pH. In waters with higher amounts of nutrients, desmids rapidly become outcompeted. Desmid species are generally found attached to aquatic vegetation, such as Utricularia, or tychoplanktonic; that is, free-floating in the water column after being disturbed.

Although the Desmidiales are cosmopolitan, a number of species appear to be restricted to continents or biogeographical realms; this is likely because desmids have strict ecological requirements and do not produce resting spores, making successful dispersal less likely. Therefore, they can be grouped into several regions each with their own characteristic desmid floras. The Indo-Malayan to North Australian realm, for example, is characterized by species such as Micrasterias ceratofera, while equatorial Africa is characterized by species such as Allorgeia incredibilis.

== Ecology ==
Although desmids are incredibly diverse, with up to hundreds of them being found in a single site, their interactions with the environment are relatively unknown. Desmids are host to a wide array of parasites, particularly fungal parasites called chytrids. They are also grazed by microscopic aquatic heterotrophs, such as crustaceans, rotifers, and ciliates.
