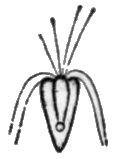

Scientific classification
- Kingdom: Plantae
- Division: Chlorophyta
- Class: Pyramimonadophyceae
- Order: Pyramimonadales
- Family: Pyramimonadaceae
- Genus: Pyramimonas
- Species: P. tetrarhynchus

Binomial name
- Pyramimonas tetrarhynchus Schmarda 1850

= Pyramimonas tetrarhynchus =

Species of alga

Pyramimonas tetrarhynchus is the type species of genus Pyramimonas.
