= Characiopsis elegans =

Scientific classification
- Domain: Eukaryota
- Clade: Diaphoretickes
- Clade: SAR
- Clade: Stramenopiles
- Phylum: Gyrista
- Subphylum: Ochrophytina
- Class: Xanthophyceae
- Order: Mischococcales
- Family: Characiopsidaceae
- Genus: Characiopsis
- Species: C. elegans

Binomial name
- Characiopsis elegans Ettl 1956

Species of alga

Characiopsis elegans is a species of freshwater yellow-green algae in the family Characiopsidaceae. It is described from Arkansas, North America and Brazil, South America.
