= P. marginatum =

P. marginatum may refer to:

- Piper marginatum, the cake bush, Anesi wiwiri, marigold pepper, Ti Bombé in Creole or Hinojo, a plant species found in moist, shady spots in the Amazon rainforest in Surinam, French Guiana and Brazil
- Plasmodium marginatum, a parasite species
- Pterosperma marginatum, a green algae species

== See also ==
- Marginatum (disambiguation)
