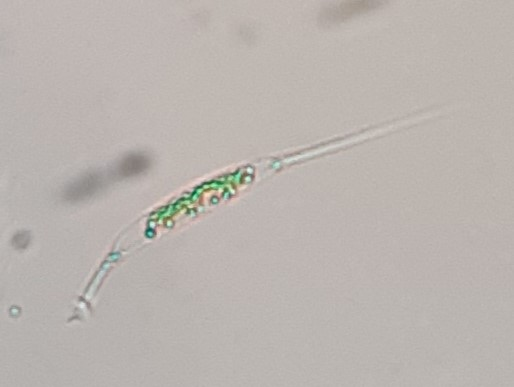
- Ankyra judayi

Scientific classification
- Kingdom: Plantae
- Division: Chlorophyta
- Class: Chlorophyceae
- Order: Sphaeropleales
- Family: Sphaeropleaceae
- Genus: Ankyra; Fott, 1957

Type species
- Ankyra ancora (G.M.Smith) Fott

Species
- Ankyra ancora; Ankyra calcarifera; Ankyra inermis; Ankyra judayi; Ankyra lanceolata; Ankyra ocellata; Ankyra paradoxioides; Ankyra starrii

= Ankyra =

Genus of algae

Ankyra is a genus of green algae in the family Characiaceae. This genus of algae is closely related to Atractomorpha and Sphaeroplea. They are found in stagnant waters.

Ankyra consists of single cells that are planktonic or epiphytic. Cells are spindle-shaped or cylindrical with the ends tapering into long spines. At one end, the spine is bifid and/or enlarged into a spatula-like appendage. The cell wall consists of two pieces that are joined together at the middle of the cell. One band-shaped chloroplast lines the inside of the cell membrane, and contains a single pyrenoid.

Reproduction occurs via zoospores which are released when the two halves of the cell wall break apart, or through a hole formed in the cell wall. Sexual reproduction has not been observed in Ankyra. However, various aplanospore-like stages and other resting stages have been observed in Ankyra, and need to be studied further.

Species are identified based on the shape of the cells and their appendages.
