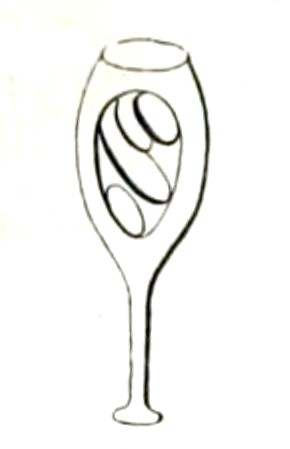
- Hydrianum ovale

Scientific classification
- Clade: Viridiplantae
- Division: Chlorophyta
- Class: Chlorophyceae
- Order: Chlamydomonadales
- Family: incertae sedis
- Genus: Hydrianum; Rabenhorst, 1868

Type species
- Hydrianum ovale Rabenhorst

Species
- Hydrianum coronatum Fott; Hydrianum crassiapex Korshikov; Hydrianum diogenes (F.W.Jane) Fott; Hydrianum ellipticum Korshikov; Hydrianum gracile Korshikov; Hydrianum lageniforme Korshikov; Hydrianum ovale Rabenhorst; Hydrianum pyrenoidiferum Massjuk

Synonyms
- Chlororhabdion F.W.Jane

= Hydrianum =

Genus of algae

Hydrianum is a genus of green algae, in the order Chlamydomonadales. It is found in freshwater habitats such as marshes and bogs, as an epiphyte on plants or other algae. It is common, but most likely overlooked due to its similarity with similar genera such as Characium.

== Description ==
Hydrianum consists of solitary or clustered cells attached to a substrate, via a mucilaginous pad or a stipe. Cells are cylindrical, oval, or spindle-shaped; in some species they are distinctly curved. Cells are uninucleate (with a single nucleus), they contain a single parietal chloroplast (or multiple when older). Pyrenoids are generally absent but may be present in a few species.

Asexual reproduction occurs via the formation of zoospores; the zoospores are released through a rupture near the apex of the cell wall, while one zoospore stays behind and develops into a new vegetative cell. Zoospores have two flagella and a single chloroplast. After swimming, the zoospores settle and develop into a new cell. Sexual reproduction has not been observed in this genus.

Members of Hydrianum with a pyrenoid can be confused with Characium, but in Hydrianum the zoospores exit subapically or apically, while in Characium the zoospores exit through a lateral opening. Additionally, in Hydrianum a zoospore may remain in the sporangium and develop into a new cell. The genus is also similar to Characiopsis, which generally lacks pyrenoids, but is unrelated.
