= Chloraster =

Chloraster is the scientific name of two genera of organisms and may refer to:

- Chloraster Haw. (1824), a name for a genus of flowering plants currently regarded as a synonym of Narcissus
- Chloraster Ehrenberg (1848), an illegitimate name for a genus of green algae in the order Pyramimonadales
