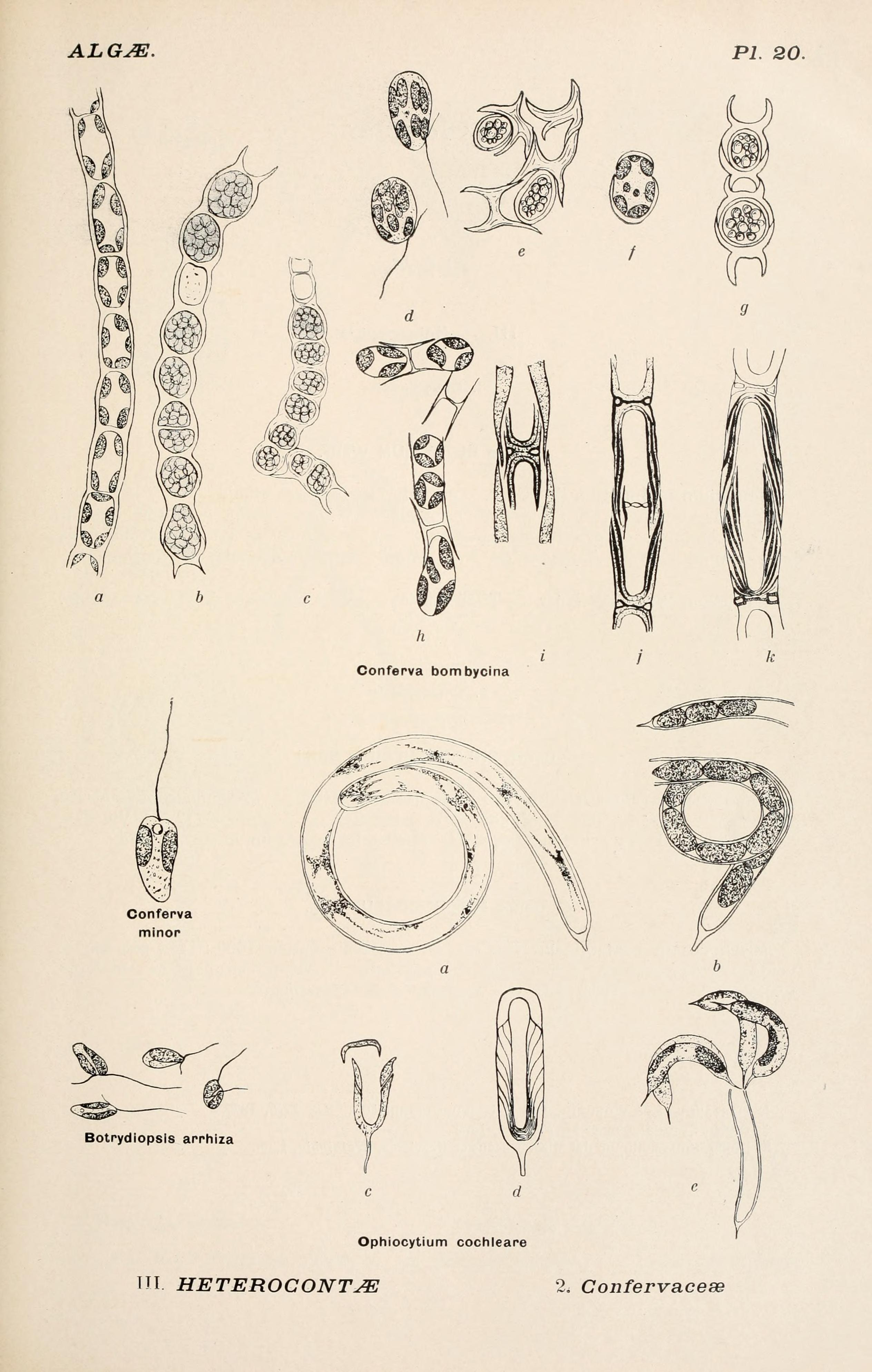
- Examples of xanthophytes (repair the unequal flagella in the cells)

Scientific classification
- Domain: Eukaryota
- Clade: Sar
- Clade: Stramenopiles
- Division: Ochrophyta
- Clade: PX
- Class: Xanthophyceae; Allorge, 1930, emend. Fritsch, 1935

Synonyms
- Heterokontae Luther, 1899; Heterochloridia Pascher, 1912; Tribophyceae Hibberd, 1981; Heteromonadida Leedale, 1983; Xanthophyta Hibberd, 1990

= Yellow-green algae =

Class of algae

Yellow-green algae or the Xanthophyceae (xanthophytes) are an important group of heterokont algae. Most live in fresh water, but some are found in marine and soil habitats. They vary from single-celled flagellates to simple colonial and filamentous forms. Xanthophyte chloroplasts contain the photosynthetic pigments chlorophyll a, chlorophyll c, β-carotene, and the carotenoid diadinoxanthin. Unlike other Stramenopiles (heterokonts), their chloroplasts do not contain fucoxanthin, which accounts for their lighter colour. Their storage polysaccharide is chrysolaminarin. Xanthophyte cell walls are produced of cellulose and hemicellulose. They appear to be the closest relatives of the brown algae.

== Classifications ==
The species now placed in the Xanthophyceae were formerly included in the Chlorophyceae. In 1899, Lüther created the group Heterokontae for green algae with unequal flagella. Pascher (1914) included the Heterokontae in the Chrysophyta. In 1930, Allorge renamed the group as Xanthophyceae.

The monadoid (unicellular flagellates) and also sometimes the amoeboid species have been included by some authors in the Protozoa or Protista, as order Heterochloridina (e.g., Doflein and Reichenow, 1927–1929), as class Xanthomonadina, with orders Heterochloridea and Rhizochloridea (e.g., Deflandre, 1956), as order Heterochlorida (e.g., Hall, 1953, Honigberg et al., 1964), as order Heteromonadida (e.g., Leedale, 1983), or as subclass Heterochloridia (e.g., Puytorac et al., 1987). These groups are called ambiregnal protists, as names for these have been published under either or both of the ICZN and the ICN.

=== AlgaeBase (2020) ===
Xanthophyceae have been divided into the following five orders in some classification systems:

- Dictyosphaeriopsis
- Groenlandiella
- Halosphaeropsis
- Pelagocystis
- Polyedrium
- Pseudopleurochloris
- Raphidosphaera
- Sphaerochloris
- Tiresias
- Order Botrydiales Schaffner 1922
  - Family Botrydiaceae Rabenhorst 1863 e.g. Botrydium
- Order Mischococcales Fritsch 1927
  - Family Botrydiopsidaceae Hibberd 1980 e.g. Botrydiopsis
  - Family Botryochloridaceae Pascher 1938 e.g. Ilsteria
  - Family Centritractaceae Pascher 1937 e.g. Centritractus
  - Family Characiopsidaceae Pascher 1938 e.g. Characiopsis, Chlorothecium
  - Family Chloropediaceae Pascher 1931 e.g. Chloropedia
  - Family Gloeobotrydaceae Pascher 1937 e.g. Gloeobotrys
  - Family Gloeopodiaceae Pascher 1938 e.g. Gloeopodium
  - Family Mischococcaceae Pascher 1912 e.g. Mischococcus
  - Family Ophiocytiaceae Lemmermann 1899 e.g. Ophiocytium
  - Family Pleurochloridaceae Pascher 1937 e.g. Meringosphaera, Pleurochloris
  - Family Trypanochloridaceae Geitler ex Pascher 1938 e.g. Trypanochloris
- Order Rhizochloridales Pascher 1925
  - Family Myxochloridaceae Pascher 1937 e.g. Myxochloris
  - Family Rhizochloridaceae Pascher 1925 e.g. Rhizochloris
  - Family Stipitococcaceae Pascher ex Smith 1933 e.g. Stipitococcus
- Order Tribonematales Pascher 1939
  - Family Heterodendraceae Pascher 1939 e.g. Heterodendron
  - Family Heteropediaceae Hibberd 1982 e.g. Heterococcus, Heteropedia
  - Family Neonemataceae Ettl 1977 e.g. Neonema
  - Family Tribonemataceae West 1904 e.g. Tribonema
  - Family Xanthonemataceae Silva 1980 e.g. Xanthonema
- Order Vaucheriales Nägeli ex Bohlin 1901
  - Family Vaucheriaceae (Gray) Dumortier 1822 e.g. Vaucheria

=== Lüther (1899) ===
Classification according to Lüther (1899):

- Class Heterokontae
  - Order Chloromonadales
  - Order Confervales

=== Pascher (1912) ===
Classification according to Pascher (1912):

- Heterokontae
  - Heterochloridales
  - Heterocapsales
  - Heterococcales
  - Heterotrichales
  - Heterosiphonales

=== Fritsch (1935) ===
Fritsch (1935) recognizes the following orders in the class Xanthophyceae:

- Order Heterochloridales
  - Family Heterochloridaceae (e.g., Heterochloris)
  - Family Heterocapsaceae (e.g., Chlorogloea)
  - Family Mischococcaceae (e.g., Mischococcus)
  - Family Heterorhizidaceae (e.g., Rhizolekane)
- Order Heterococcales
  - Family Halosphaeraceae (e.g., Halosphaera)
  - Family Myxochloridaceae (e.g., Myxochloris)
  - Family Chlorobotrydaceae(e.g., Chlorobotrys)
  - Family Chlorotheciaceae (e.g., Chlorothecium)
  - Family Ophiocytiaceae (e.g., Ophiocytium)
- Order Heterotrichales
  - Family Tribonemataceae (e.g., Tribonema)
  - Family Heterocloniaceae (e.g., Heterodendron[?])
- Order Heterosiphonales
  - Family Botrydiaceae (e.g., Botrydium)

=== Smith (1938) ===
In the classification of Smith (1938), there are six orders in the class Xanthophyceae, placed in the division Chrysophyta:

- Order Heterochloridales (e.g., Chlorochromonas)
- Order Rhizochloridales (e.g., Chlorarachnion)
- Order Heterocapsales (e.g., Chlorosaccus)
- Order Heterotrichales (e.g., Tribonema)
- Order Heterococcales (e.g., Botrydiopsis)
- Order Heterosiphonales (e.g., Botrydium)

=== Pascher (1939) ===
Pascher (1939) recognizes 6 classes in Heterokontae:

- Class Heterochloridineae
- Class Rhizochloridineae
- Class Hetcrocapsineae
- Class Heterococcincae
- Class Hetcrotrichineae
- Class Heterosiphonineae

=== Copeland (1956) ===
Copeland (1956) treated the group as order Vaucheriacea:

- Kingdom Protoctista
  - Phylum Phaeophyta
    - Class Heterokonta
      - Order Vaucheriacea
        - Family Chlorosaccacea
        - Family Mischococcacea
        - Family Chlorotheciacea
        - Family Botryococcacea
        - Family Stipitococcacea
        - Family Chloramoebacea
        - Family Tribonematacea
        - Family Phyllosiphonacea

=== Ettl (1978), van den Hoek et al. (1995) ===
In a classification presented by van den Hoek, Mann and Jahns (1995), based on the level of organization of the thallus, there are seven orders:

- Order Chloramoebales (e.g., Chloromeson) - flagellate organisms
- Order Rhizochloridales (e.g., Rhizochloris, Myxochloris) - ameboid organisms
- Order Heterogloeales (e.g., Gloeochloris) - palmelloid (tetrasporal) organisms
- Order Mischococcales (e.g., Chloridella, Botrydiopsis, Characiopsis, Ophiocytium) - coccoid organisms
- Order Tribonematales (e.g., Tribonema, Heterococcus, Heterodendron) - filamentous organization
- Order Botrydiales (e.g., Botrydium) - siphonous organization; sexual reproduction isogamous or anisogamous
- Order Vaucheriales (e.g., Vaucheria) - siphonous organization; sexual reproduction oogamous

These are the same orders of the classification of Ettl (1978), an updated version of the classic work by Pascher (1939). Ultrastructural and molecular studies shows that the Mischococcales might be paraphyletic, and the Tribonematales and Botrydiales polyphyletic, and suggests two orders at most be used until the relationships within the division are sorted.

=== Maistro et al. (2009) ===
Informal groups, according to Maistro et al. (2009):

- Botrydiopsalean clade
- Chlorellidialean clade
- Tribonematalean clade
- Vaucherialean clade

Unicellular flagellates, amoeboid and palmelloid taxa were not included in this study.

=== Adl et al. (2005, 2012) ===
According to Adl et al. (2005, 2012):

- Tribonematales (genera Botrydium, Bumilleriopsis, Characiopsis, Chloromeson, Heterococcus, Ophiocytium, Sphaerosorus, Tribonema, Xanthonema)
- Vaucheriales (genus Vaucheria)
Stipitococcus capense (Rhizochloridales)

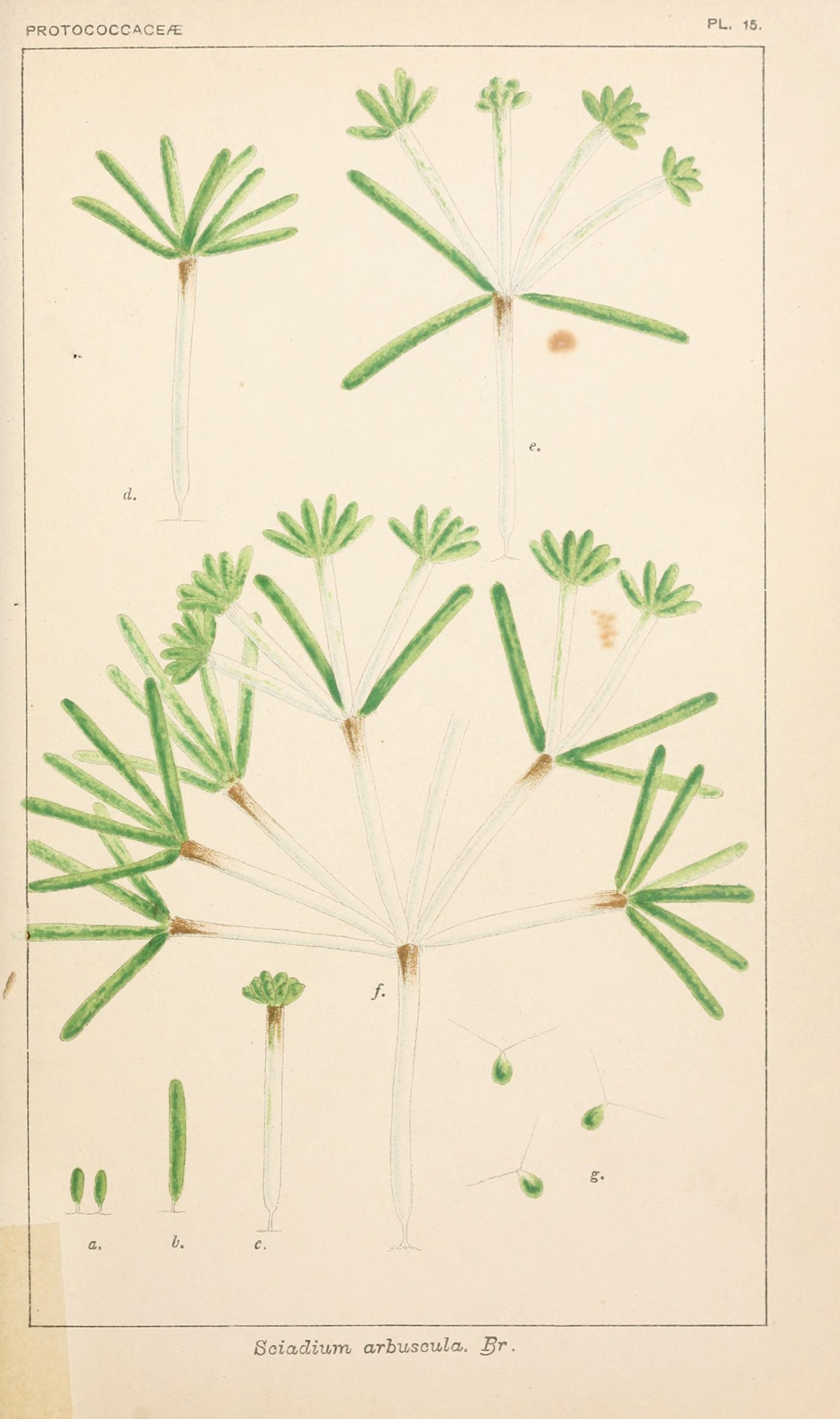
Ophiocytium arbusculum (Mischococcales), formerly Sciadium arbuscula

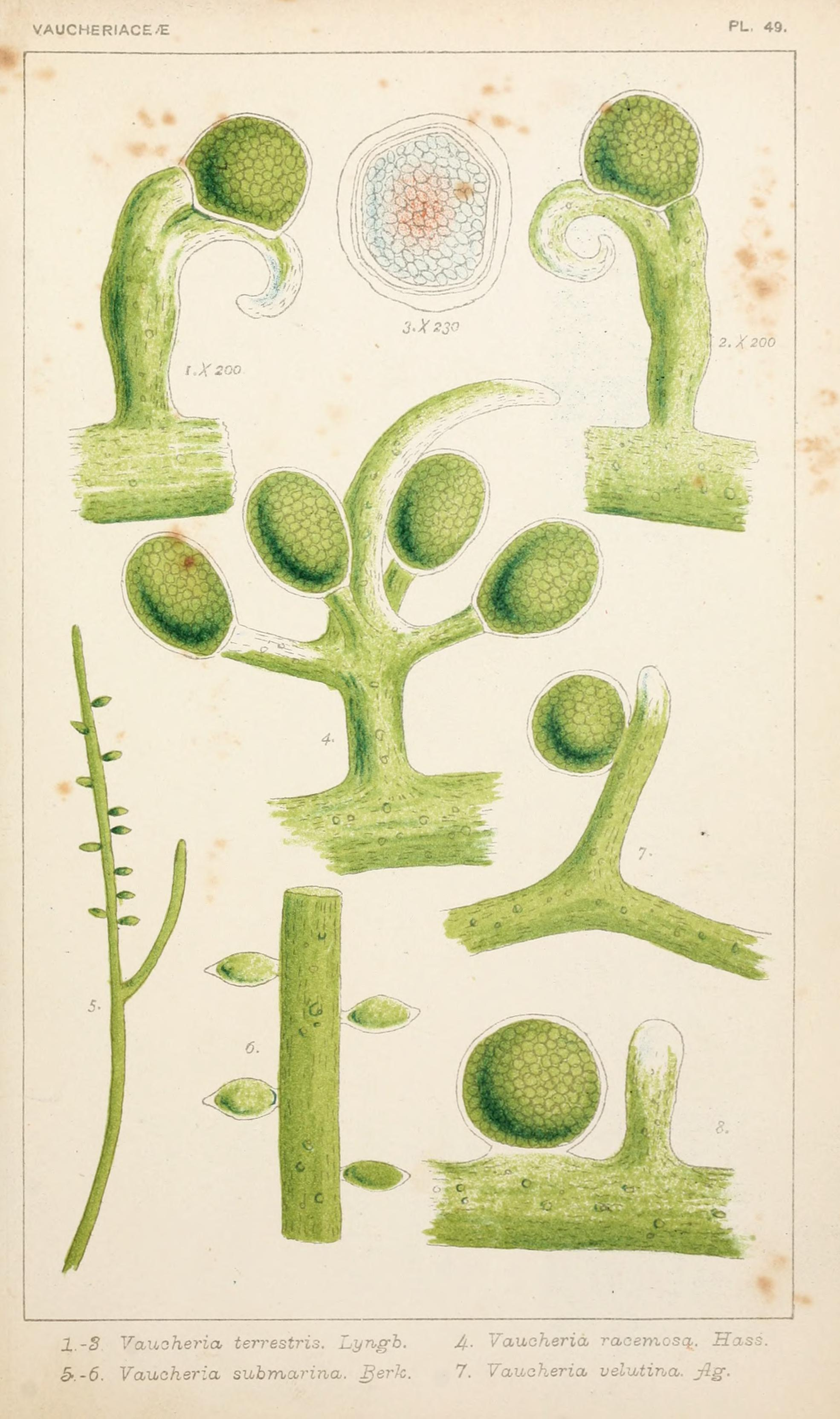
Vaucheria sp.

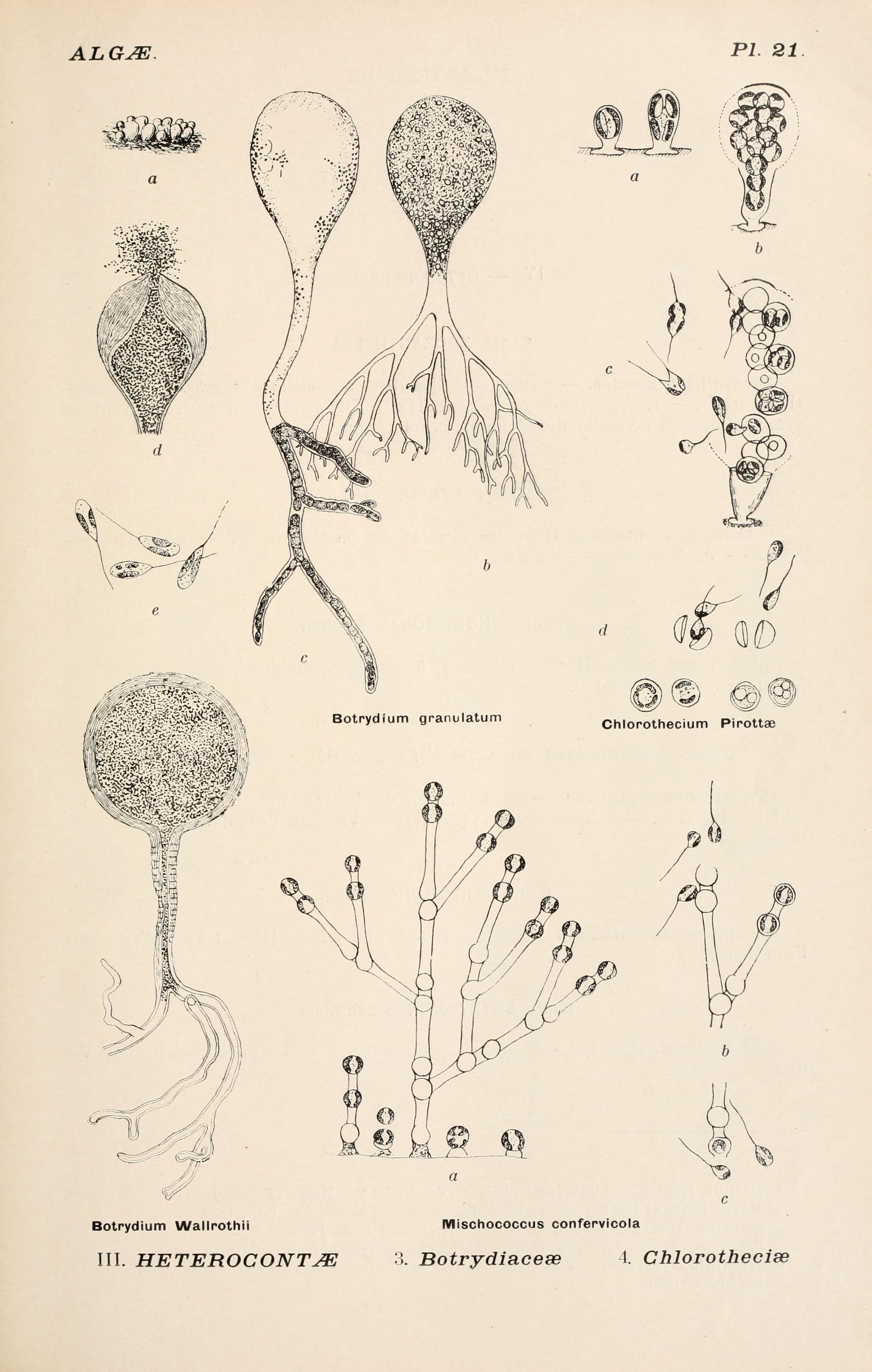
Other genera
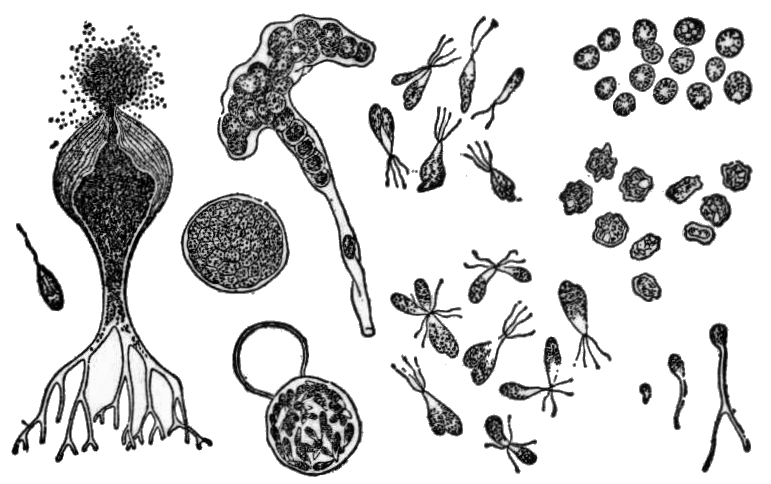
Botrydium granulatum (Botrydiales)

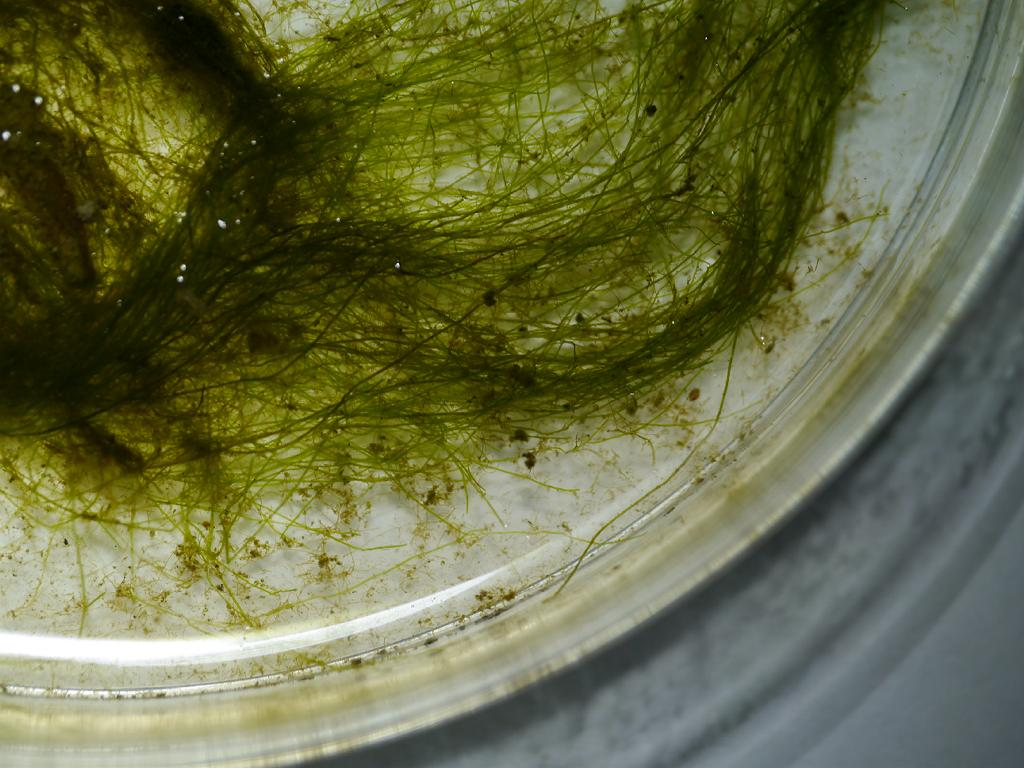
Vaucheria sp. (Vaucheriales), thallus

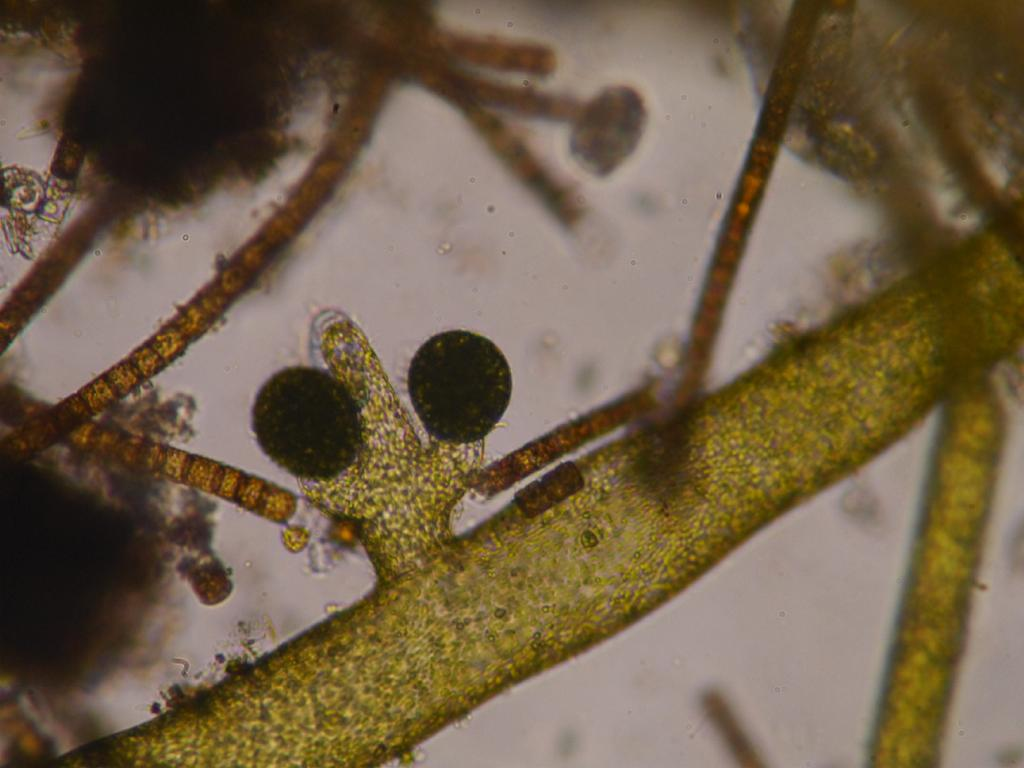
Vaucheria sp., sexual reproductive organs

== See also ==
- Coccolithophore
- Cyanobacteria
- Diatom
