= Atractomorpha =

Atractomorpha may refer to:

- Atractomorpha (alga), an algae genus in the family Sphaeropleaceae
- Atractomorpha (grasshopper), a grasshopper genus in the family Pyrgomorphidae
