= Lanceola =

Scientific classification
- Clade: Viridiplantae
- Division: Chlorophyta
- Class: Chlorophyceae
- Order: Sphaeropleales
- Family: Characiaceae
- Genus: Lanceola; Hindák, 1988
- Species: L. spatulifera

Binomial name
- Lanceola spatulifera (Korshikov) Hindák

Genus of algae

Lanceola is a genus of green algae in the family Characiaceae, containing a single species, Lanceola spatulifera. It is found in freshwater habitats.

Lanceola consists of free-floating, single cells. The cell is narrowly spindle-shaped (fusiform), tapered into a narrow spine at one end, and at the other end a lanceolate appendage. The cell wall is smooth. Cells contain a single parietal chloroplast with a pyrenoid, and a central nucleus. It reproduces by forming zoospores with two flagella.

The genus was created by František Hindák for the leaf-like appendage on one end of the cell. However, it has been rejected by other taxonomists, because the structure appears typical of the appendages found in the genus Ankyra.
