= Deuterocharacium =

Scientific classification
- Kingdom: Plantae
- Division: Chlorophyta
- Class: Chlorophyceae
- Order: Sphaeropleales
- Family: Characiaceae
- Genus: Deuterocharacium; Petrý-Hesse, 1969

Type species
- Deuterocharacium polyplastidicum Petrý-Hesse

Species
- Deuterocharacium fallax; Deuterocharacium polyplastidicum

Genus of algae

Deuterocharacium is a genus of green algae in the family Characiaceae. It is found in freshwater habitats, attached to algae or detritus. It is rare and has only been recorded from Europe.

== Description ==
Deuterocharacium consists of solitary cells that are attached to a substrate via a short mucilaginous pad or a pedicel. Cells are 30-50 μm long and 6-12 μm wide, cylindrical to ovoid, with a rounded or pointed tip. Cells have many small, discoid chloroplasts lining the inside of the cell membrane, which lack pyrenoids. Deuterocharacium has been described as uninucleate (i.e. containing a single nucleus); other sources state the adult cells are multinucleate, but this may be before the zoospores are formed. No eyespot is present.

Deuterocharacium reproduces asexually; sexual reproduction has not been observed in this genus. It obligately produces zoospores which have two flagella and a single chloroplast containing a pyrenoid. Zoospores are produced in groups of 32 to 128, and are released through a tear in the mother cell wall.

=== Identification ===
Similar genera include Characium and Pseudochlorothecium. Characium differs in having chloroplasts with pyrenoids. It differs from Pseudochlorothecium in that it does not reproduce via autospores, only via zoospores.

Within Deuterocharacium, two species are known, D. polyplastidicum and D. fallax, which differ based on the shape of the cells.
