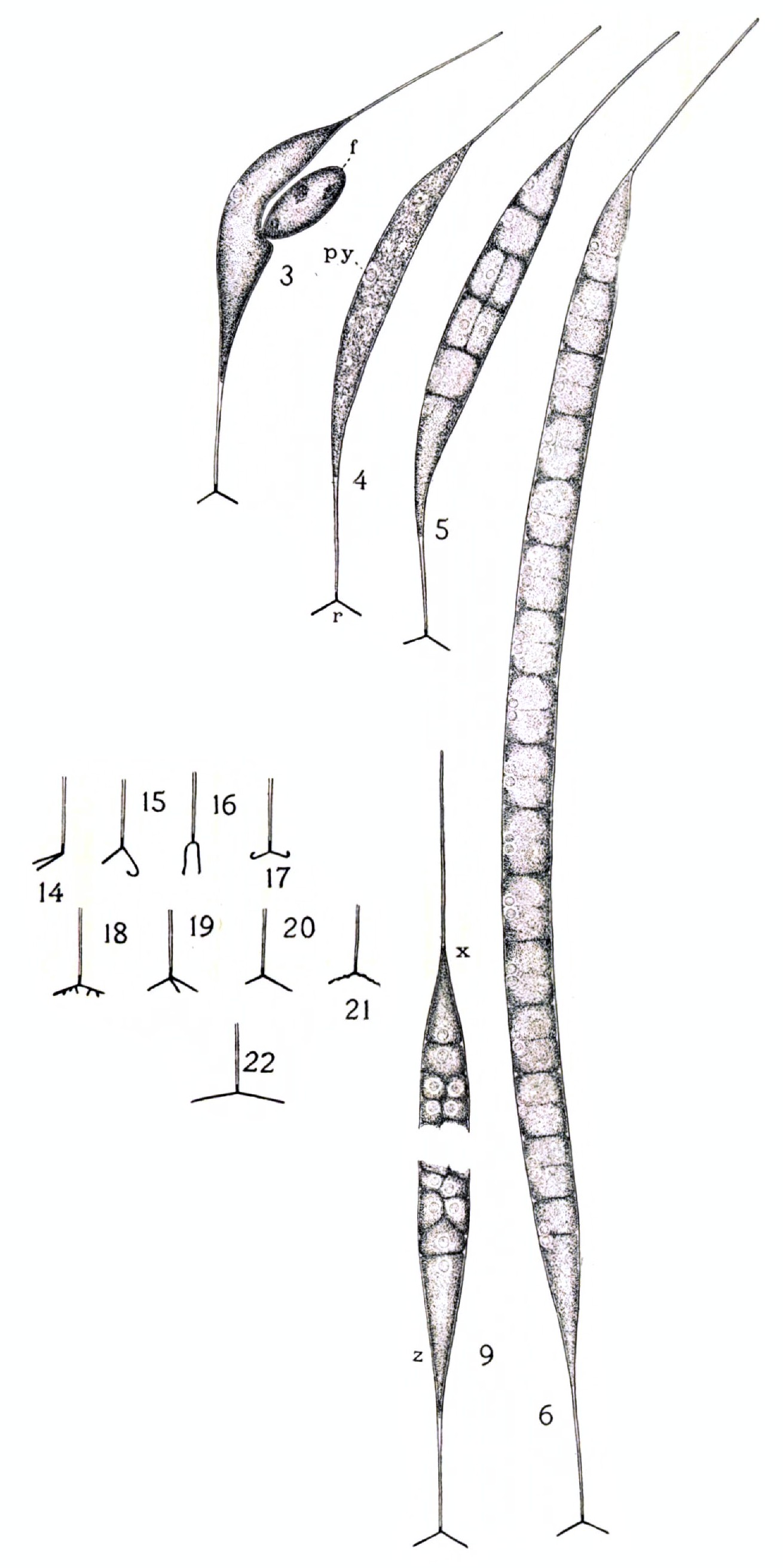
- Korshikoviella michailovskoensis

Scientific classification
- Kingdom: Plantae
- Division: Chlorophyta
- Class: Chlorophyceae
- Order: Sphaeropleales
- Family: Characiaceae
- Genus: Korshikoviella; P.C.Silva, 1959

Type species
- Korshikoviella michailovskoensis (Elenkin) P.C.Silva

Species
- Korshikoviella limnetica; Korshikoviella michailovskoensis; Korshikoviella mystacina; Korshikoviella rotundata; Korshikoviella schaefernai; Korshikoviella setosa

= Korshikoviella =

Genus of algae

Korshikoviella is a genus of green algae in the family Characiaceae.

The genus name of Korshikoviella is in honour of Aleksandr Arkadievich Korshikov (1889–1942), who was a Ukrainian botanist from the National University of Kharkiv. It is sometimes spelled as Korschikoviella.

The genus was circumscribed by Paul Claude Silva in Taxon vol.8 on page 63 in 1959.

== Description ==
Korshikoviella consists of single cells that are epiphytic or epizoic on freshwater algae or crustaceans, or sometimes planktonic. Cells are narrow and spindle-shaped, 25-480 μm long; one end of the cell tapers into a sharp point (or is rounded), while the other end is usually bifurcated (with the exception of K. limnetica) and may be attached to a substrate. Young cells contain a single parietal, laminar chloroplast; as the cell matures, the chloroplast divides, with adult cells having several chloroplasts along the length of the cell. Each chloroplast contains one pyrenoid.

Korshikoviella reproduces asexually via zoospores. Zoospores have two flagella, a contractile vacuole, one band-shaped pyrenoid-bearing chloroplast, and an stigma. They are released from the mother cell via a tear in the cell wall. Sexual reproduction has been observed in Korshikoviella michailovskoensis. The male and female gametangia are well-differentiated from the rest of the cell. The species is oogamous, with immobile female gametes and mobile male gametes.

A similar genus of algae is Ankyra. Unlike Korshikoviella, it is not epibiontic, and the cell wall of Ankyra is in two separate pieces, while that of Korshikoviella is in one piece.

== Habitat and distribution ==
Korshikoviella is found in the coastal areas of lentic ecosystems, and is generally associated with other algae. It is rare and seldom collected, but probably cosmopolitan.

== Ecology ==
One species, Korshikoviella gracilipes is an epibiont on Daphnia pulicaria. K. gracilipes appears to have evolutionary adaptations to an epizoic lifestyles, such as timing zoospore and cyst formation with the molting process of Daphnia.
