= C. marginatum =

C. marginatum may refer to:

- Caecum marginatum, a sea snail species
- Clinostomum marginatum, the yellow grub, a parasitic fluke species found in many freshwater fish in North America

== See also ==
- Marginatum (disambiguation)
