= Characium marinum =

Scientific classification
- Kingdom: Plantae
- Division: Chlorophyta
- Class: Chlorophyceae
- Order: Sphaeropleales
- Family: Characiaceae
- Genus: Characium
- Species: C. marinum

Binomial name
- Characium marinum Kjellm.

Species of alga

Characium marinum is a species of green algae (Chlorophyta).

== Description ==
Characium marinum is a microscopic unicellular elongated oval algae growing attached epiphytically by a stalk various algae. The single chloroplast is parietal with a single pyrenoid.

== Ecology ==
Epiphytic on other marine algae. and eastern Canada

== Distribution ==
Recorded from Svalbard (Norway), Sweden, once in Ireland County Down, twice in Great Britain, under-recorded. and eastern Canada.

== Status ==
The taxonomic status of this alga is unclear. According to the marine biologist T. Levring, Characium marinum probably represents germlings of Cladophora, a genus of marine algae.
