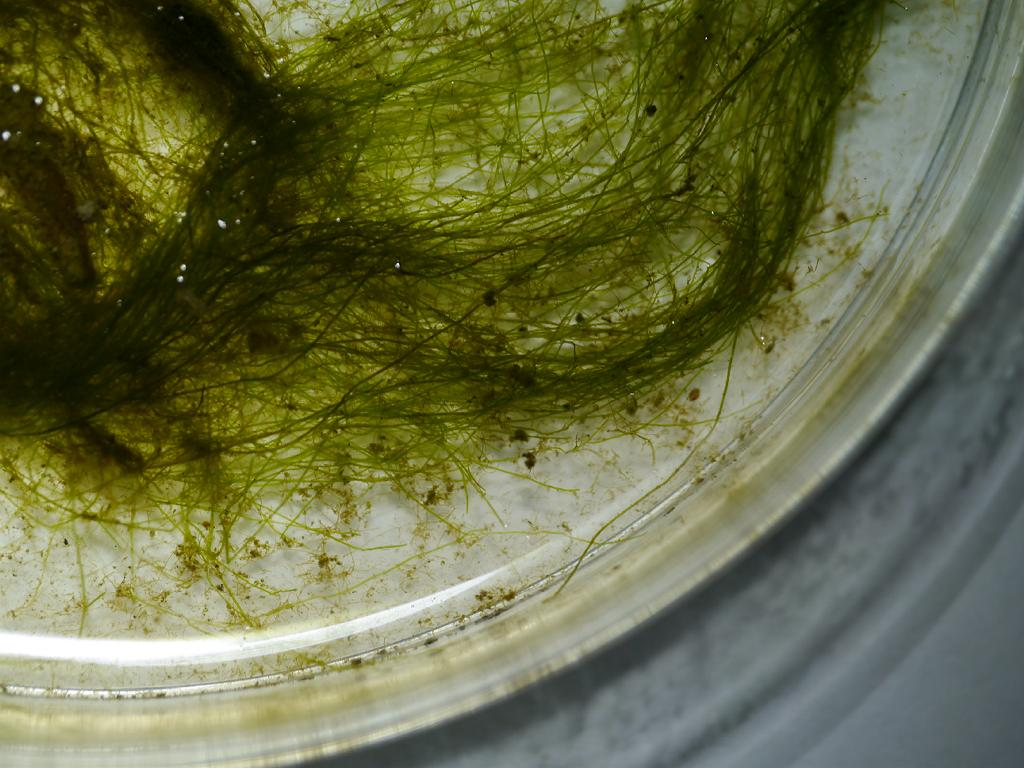
- Vaucheria sp. collected from a paddy field, Tanabe, Wakayama, Japan

Scientific classification
- Domain: Eukaryota
- Clade: Sar
- Clade: Stramenopiles
- Division: Ochrophyta
- Class: Xanthophyceae
- Order: Vaucheriales
- Family: Vaucheriaceae
- Genus: Vaucheria; A.P. de Candolle

Species
- See text

= Vaucheria =

Genus of yellow-green algae

Vaucheria is a genus of Xanthophyceae or yellow-green algae known as water felt. It is one of only two genera in the family Vaucheriaceae. The type species of the genus is Vaucheria disperma.

The genus was circumscribed by Augustin Pyramus de Candolle in Bull. Sci. Soc. Philom. Paris vol.3 on page 20 in 1801.

The genus name of Vaucheria is in honour of Jean Pierre Étienne Vaucher (1763–1841), who was a Swiss Protestant pastor and botanist.

Vaucheria exhibits apical growth from the tip of filaments forming mats in either terrestrial or freshwater environments. Its filaments form coenocytes with a large central vacuole pushing against the surrounding cytoplasm; the vacuole extends along the entire filament except for the growing tip. The chloroplasts are located on the periphery of the cytoplasm with the nuclei aggregating toward the center near the vacuole.

It has a haplontic life cycle, previously thought to be diplontic.

== Species ==
As accepted by WoRMS;

- Vaucheria acrandra Ott & Hommersand, 1974
- Vaucheria adela Ott & Hommersand, 1974
- Vaucheria adunca C.-C.Jao, 1939
- Vaucheria aestuarii Muralidhar, Novis & Broady, 2014
- Vaucheria alaskana Blum, 1953
- Vaucheria amphibia Randhawa, 1939
- Vaucheria antarctica Renisch, 1890
- Vaucheria arcassonensis P.J.L.Dangeard, 1939
- Vaucheria arechavaletae Magnus & Wille, 1884
- Vaucheria aversa Hassall, 1843
- Vaucheria bermudensis W.R.Taylor & Bernatowicz, 1952
- Vaucheria bicornigera T.J.Entwisle, 1988
- Vaucheria bilateralis C.-C.Jao, 1936
- Vaucheria birostris J.Simons, 1974
- Vaucheria borealis Hirn, 1900
- Vaucheria bursata (O.F.Müller) C.Agardh, 1811
- Vaucheria caloundrensis A.B.Cribb, 1960
- Vaucheria canalicularis (Linnaeus) T.A.Christensen, 1968
- Vaucheria compacta (Collins) Collins ex W.R.Taylor, 1937
- Vaucheria conifera T.A.Christensen, 1987
- Vaucheria coronata Nordstedt, 1879
- Vaucheria crenulata Prescott, 1953
- Vaucheria cruciata (Vaucher) De Candolle, 1805
- Vaucheria dichotoma (Linnaeus) C.Martius, 1817
- Vaucheria dillwynii (F.Weber & D.Mohr) C.Agardh, 1811
- Vaucheria discoidea C.E.Taft, 1937
- Vaucheria edaphica Muralidhar, Novis & Broady, 2014
- Vaucheria erythrospora T.A.Christensen, 1956
- Vaucheria folliculata Walz, 1871
- Vaucheria fontinalis (Linnaeus) T.A.Christensen, 1868
- Vaucheria frigida (Roth) C.Agardh, 1824
- Vaucheria gardneri Collins, 1907
- Vaucheria geminata (Vaucher) De Candolle, 1805
- Vaucheria glomerata Blum & Womersley, 1955
- Vaucheria gyrogyna T.J.Entwisle, 1988
- Vaucheria hamata (Vaucher) De Candolle, 1805
- Vaucheria hercyniana Rieth, 1974
- Vaucheria hookeri Kützing, 1856
- Vaucheria incurva T.A.Christensen, 1986
- Vaucheria intermedia Nordstedt, 1879
- Vaucheria jaoi S.-H.Ley, 1944
- Vaucheria javanica Kützing, 1849
- Vaucheria jonesii Prescott, 1938
- Vaucheria karachiensis Saifullah, Nizamuddin & Gul, 2003
- Vaucheria karnaphulii Islam, 1978
- Vaucheria leyana Q.-X.Wang & W.-M.Bao, 1991
- Vaucheria lii Rieth, 1959
- Vaucheria litorea C.Agardh, 1823
- Vaucheria longata Blum, 1953
- Vaucheria longicaulis Hoppaugh, 1930
- Vaucheria longipes Collins, 1907
- Vaucheria madhuensis R.J.Patel, 1980
- Vaucheria mayyanadensis
- Vaucheria medusa T.A.Christensen, 1952
- Vaucheria megaspora Iwanoff, 1900
- Vaucheria micranthera P.González, 1944
- Vaucheria minuta Blum & Conover, 1953
- Vaucheria mulleola Skuja, 1964
- Vaucheria nanandra T.J.Entwisle, 1988
- Vaucheria nasuta W.R.Taylor & Bernatowicz, 1953
- Vaucheria orientalis West & G.S.West, 1908
- Vaucheria orthocarpa Reinsch, 1887
- Vaucheria patagonica Hylmö, 1938
- Vaucheria piloboloides Thuret, 1854
- Vaucheria polymorpha H.C.Wood, 1869
- Vaucheria prasadense O.N.Srivastava, M.Srivastava & U.S.Prasad, 1987
- Vaucheria prescottii A.K.M.N.Islam, 1965
- Vaucheria prolifera P.J.L.Dangeard, 1939
- Vaucheria prona T.A.Christensen, 1970
- Vaucheria pronosperma A.K.M.N.Islam, 1965
- Vaucheria pseudogeminata P.J.L.Dangeard, 1939
- Vaucheria pseudomonoica F.E.Fritsch & Rich, 1924
- Vaucheria racemosa (Vaucher) De Candolle, 1805
- Vaucheria randhawae T.A.Sarma & R.S.Rattan, 1990
- Vaucheria schleicheri De Wildeman, 1895
- Vaucheria sescuplicaria T.A.Christensen, 1952
- Vaucheria sessilis (Vaucher) De Candolle, 1805
- Vaucheria simplex P.L.Crouan & H.M.Crouan
- Vaucheria subarechavaletae Borge, 1901
- Vaucheria submarina (Lyngbye) Berkeley, 1832
- Vaucheria subsimplex P.Crouan & H.Crouan, 1867
- Vaucheria synandra Woronin, 1869
- Vaucheria taylorii Blum, 1971
- Vaucheria terrestris (Vaucher) De Candolle, 1805
- Vaucheria uncinata Kützing, 1856
- Vaucheria undulata C.-C.Jao, 1936
- Vaucheria velutina C.Agardh, 1824
- Vaucheria venkataramanii T.A.Sarma & R.S.Rattan
- Vaucheria verticillata Meneghini, 1837
- Vaucheria vipera Blum, 1960
- Vaucheria walzii Rothert, 1896
- Vaucheria woroniniana Heering, 1907
- Vaucheria zapotecana Bonilla-Rodriguez, Garduno-Solorzano, Martinez-Garcia, Campos, Monsalvo-Reyes & Quintanar-Zuniga, 2013
