= Characiopodium =

Scientific classification
- Clade: Viridiplantae
- Division: Chlorophyta
- Class: Chlorophyceae
- Order: Sphaeropleales
- Family: Sphaeropleaceae
- Genus: Characiopodium; G.L.Floyd & Shin Watanabe

Type species
- Characiopodium typicum (K.W.Lee & Bold) G.L.Floyd & Shin Watanabe

Species
- Characiopodium hindakii; Characiopodium sp. Mary 9/21 T-3w

Genus of algae

Characiopodium is a genus of green algae in the family Sphaeropleaceae. It occurs in soils.

Characiopodium consists of cells that are attached to a substrate; the cell body is ellipsoidal, spindle-shaped, or cylindrical, with an adhesive disc. The chloroplast is typically cup- or band-shaped, sometimes stellate and branched; chloroplasts bear one or rarely several pyrenoids. Characiopodium reproduces asexually via zoospores with two flagella, more rarely with aplanospores.

Morphologically, Characiopodium is very similar to Characium; however, Characiopodium is multinucleate while Characium is uninucleate.
