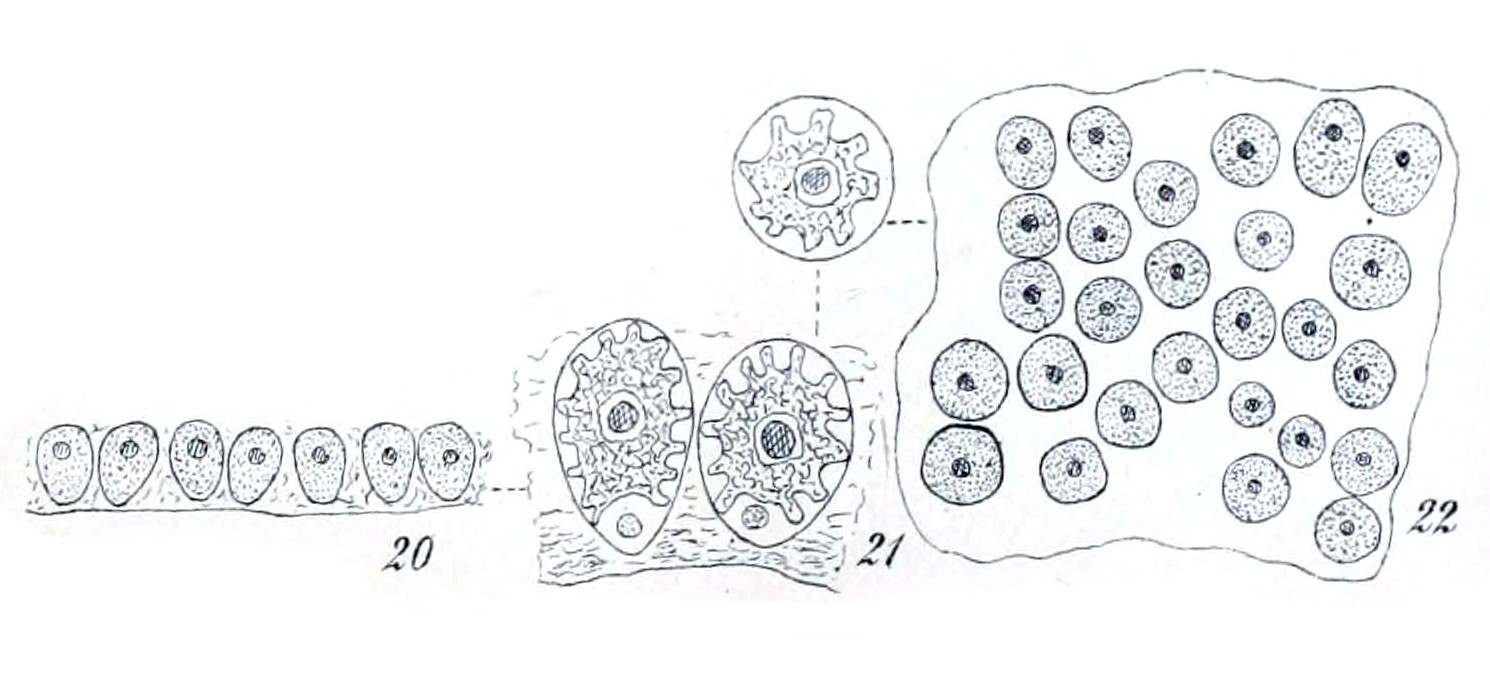
- Characiella rukwae

Scientific classification
- Clade: Viridiplantae
- Division: Chlorophyta
- Class: Chlorophyceae
- Order: Sphaeropleales
- Family: Characiaceae
- Genus: Characiella; Schmidle
- Species: C. rukwae

Binomial name
- Characiella rukwae Schmidle, 1902

= Characiella =

Genus of algae

Characiella is a genus of green algae in the family Characiaceae, containing the single species Characiella rukwae.

Characiella rukwae consists of colonies of cells embedded in a gelatinous matrix. Cells are ovoid in shape, with one nucleus at the base of the cell. There is one central, stellate chloroplast with a pyrenoid at the center. The mode of reproduction is unknown, although it is suspected to form zoospores with two flagella.

Characiella rukwae has been recorded once from the plankton of Lake Rukwa in what is now Tanzania. The genus is thus poorly known and requires modern reinvestigation.
