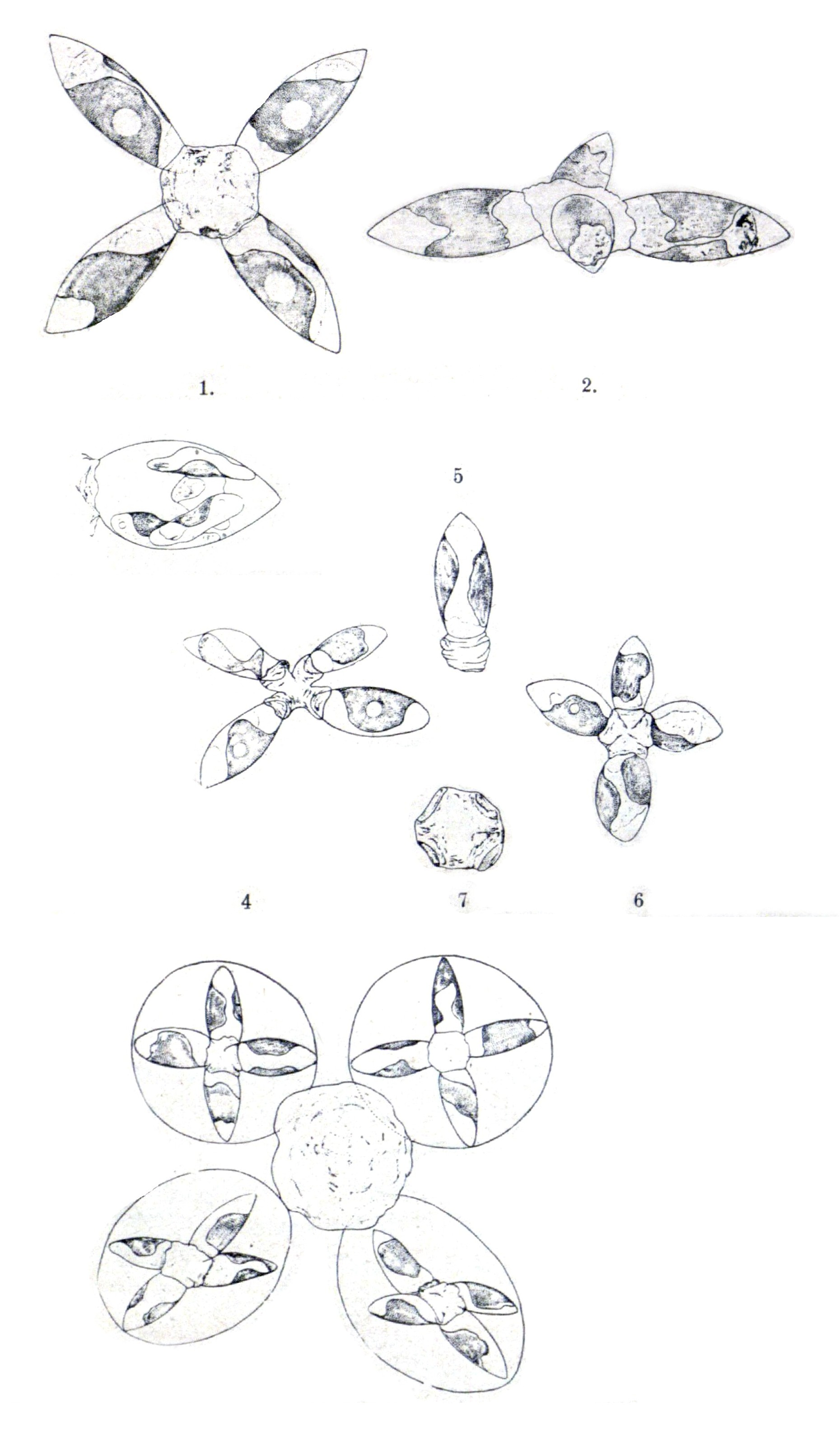
- Marthea tetras

Scientific classification
- Clade: Viridiplantae
- Division: Chlorophyta
- Class: Chlorophyceae
- Order: Sphaeropleales
- Family: Characiaceae
- Genus: Marthea; Pascher, 1918
- Species: M. tetras

Binomial name
- Marthea tetras Pascher, 1918

= Marthea =

Genus of algae

Marthea is a genus of green algae in the family Characiaceae, containing the single species Marthea tetras. It is an extremely rare genus; it has only been recorded once, as freshwater phytoplankton from its original locality in the Bohemian Forest region of the Czech Republic.

Marthea tetras consists of cells in colonies of four in a cross shape. Cells are spindle-shaped, with the base attached to a central mass of mucilage, while the apex of the cells are pointed. The cell wall is smooth. Cells contain one nucleus and a single, parietal chloroplast with one pyrenoid.

Marthea reproduces asexually by autospores. Four autospores form from one protoplast. Unusually, the autospores show amoeboid movement for some time, before settling in their usual shape and being released from the sporangium.
