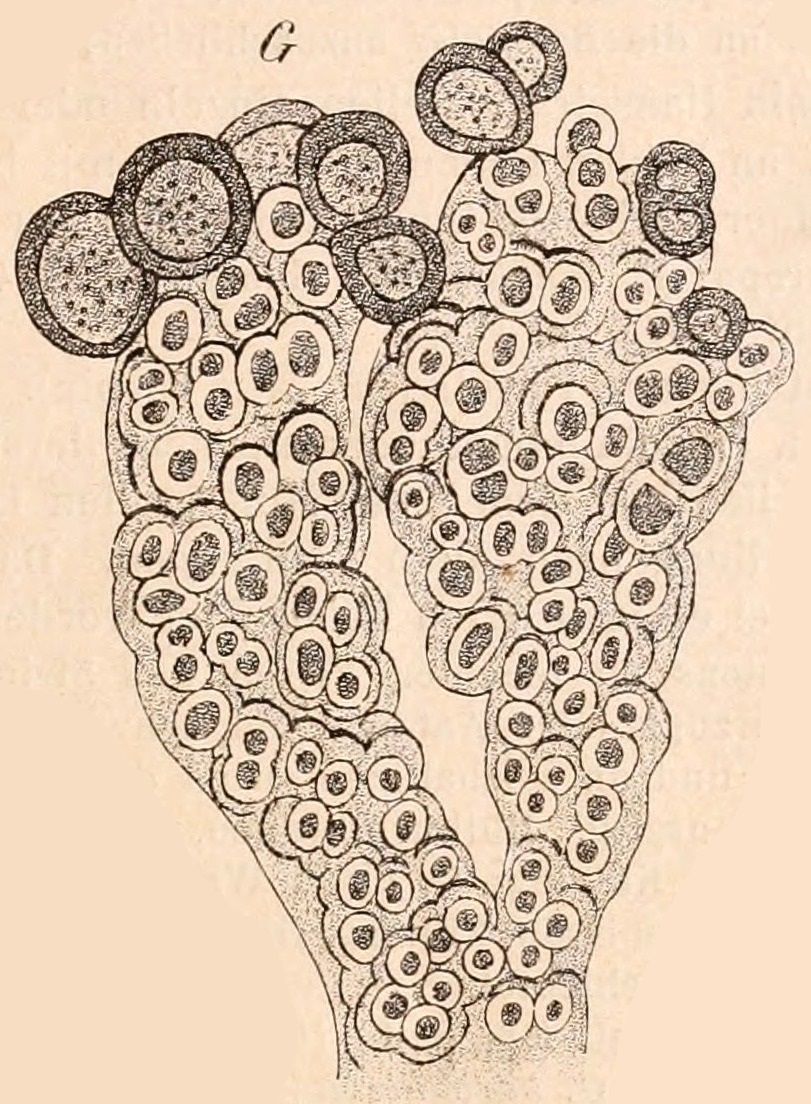
- Entophysalis granulosa Kütz.

Scientific classification
- Domain: Bacteria
- Phylum: Cyanobacteria
- Class: Cyanophyceae
- Order: Chroococcales
- Family: Entophysalidaceae; Geitler

Genera
- Chlorogloea Wille 1900; Cyanoarbor Wang 1989; Cyanodermatium Geitler 1933; Entophysalis Kützing 1843; Lithocapsa Ercegović 1925; Paracapsa Naumann 1924; Placoma Schousboe ex Bornet & Thuret 1876; Siphononema Geitler 1925; †Eoentophysalis Hofmann 1976

= Entophysalidaceae =

Family of bacteria

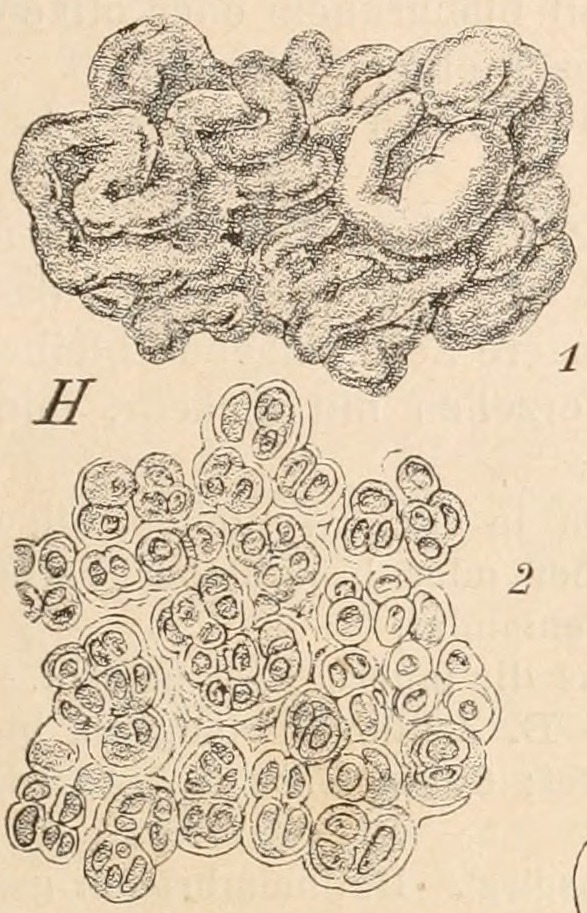
Placoma resiculosum Schousb.

Entophysalidaceae is a family of cyanobacteria.
