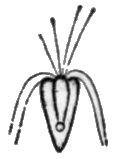
- Pyramimonas tetrarhynchus

Scientific classification
- Domain: Eukaryota
- Clade: Archaeplastida
- Clade: Viridiplantae
- Division: Chlorophyta
- Class: Pyramimonadophyceae
- Order: Pyramimonadales
- Family: Pyramimonadaceae
- Genus: Pyramimonas; Schmarda, 1849

Type species
- Pyramimonas tetrarhynchus Schmarda, 1849

Species
- Pyramimonas aureus; Pyramimonas australis; Pyramimonas cirolanae; Pyramimonas cyclotreta; Pyramimonas cyrtoptera; Pyramimonas disomata; Pyramimonas grossii; Pyramimonas mantoniae; Pyramimonas mitra; Pyramimonas moestrupii; Pyramimonas octopus; Pyramimonas olivacea; Pyramimonas orientalis; Pyramimonas parkeae; Pyramimonas propulsa; Pyramimonas tetrarhynchus; Pyramimonas tychotreta

= Pyramimonas =

Genus of algae

Pyramimonas is a genus of green algae in the order Pyramimonadales. Phototropic euglenids inherited their plastids from a close relative of Pyramimonas which was an endosymbiont inside phagotrophic eukaryovorous euglenids.

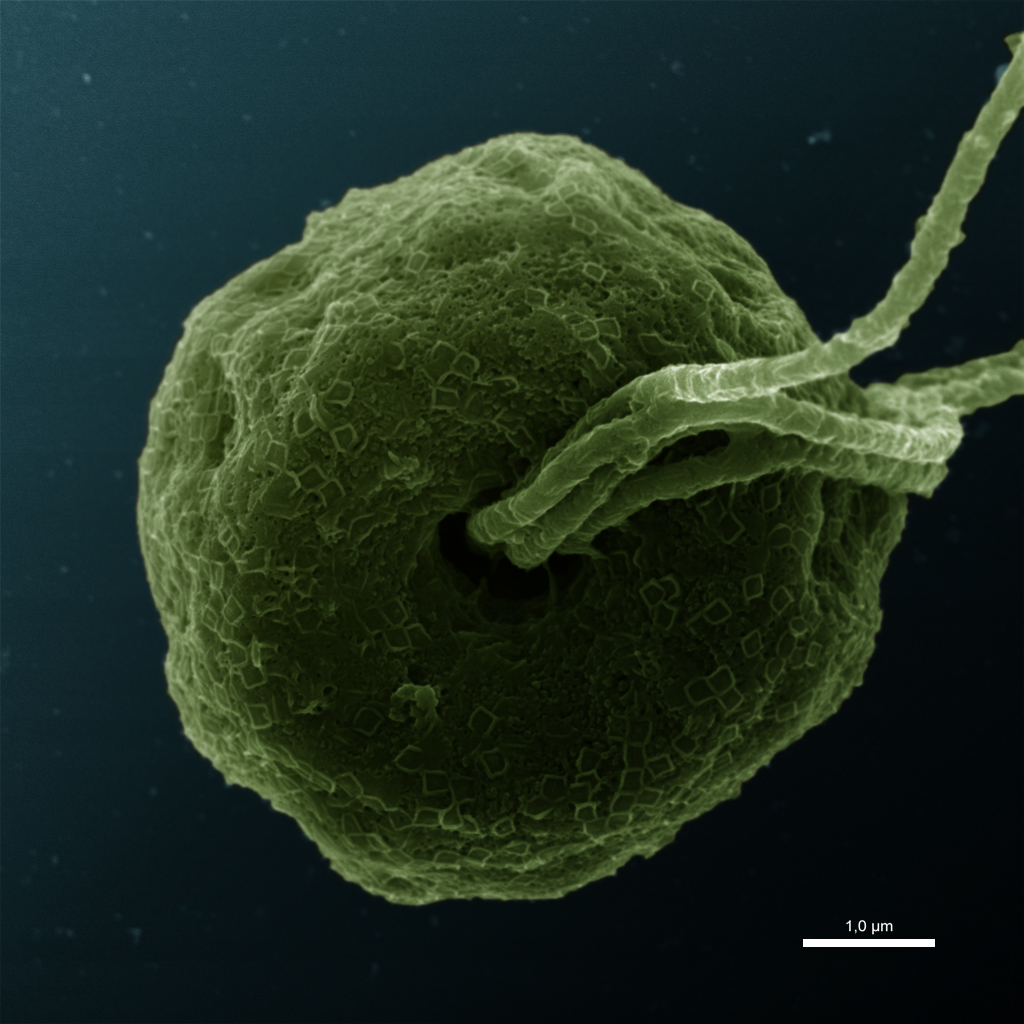
Flagellar pit of Pyramimonas sp. scale bar = 1.0 μm

== Description ==
Pyramimonas is a unicellular organism consisting of cells with at least four flagella which emerge from the anterior end. The cell is shaped like an inverse pyramid, and is square or rounded in cross section. The anterior end of the cell has a depression from which usually four (in a few species eight, one species 16) flagella emerge.

The cell contains one cup-shaped chloroplast which is divided at the anterior into four or eight lobes. The posterior (base) of the chloroplast has one pyrenoid. One or two eyespots are present at the anterior, middle, or posterior of the cell depending on the species. One species, Pyramimonas cyrtoptera, differs from all other species in having two chloroplasts, two eyespots, and two pairs of eyespots of unequal size.
