= Chlorothecium =

Scientific classification
- Domain: Eukaryota
- Clade: Sar
- Clade: Stramenopiles
- Phylum: Ochrophyta
- Class: Xanthophyceae
- Order: Mischococcales
- Family: Characiopsidaceae
- Genus: Chlorothecium; Borzì, 1885

Genus of algae

Chlorothecium is a genus of algae belonging to the family Characiopsidaceae.

Selected species:

- Chlorothecium africanum J.A.Rino
- Chlorothecium capitatum Pascher
- Chlorothecium cepa Pascher
