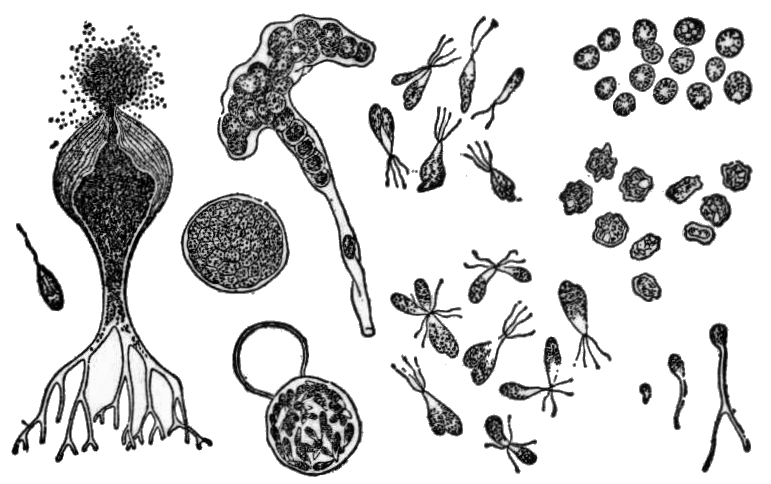
- Botrydium granulatum

Scientific classification
- Domain: Eukaryota
- Clade: Sar
- Clade: Stramenopiles
- Division: Ochrophyta
- Class: Xanthophyceae
- Order: Botrydiales; Schaffner
- Family: Botrydiaceae; Rabenhorst

Genera
- Asterosiphon; Botrydium; Polychloris

= Botrydiaceae =

Family of algae

Botrydiaceae is a family of yellow-green algae comprising 13 species in three genera. It is the only family in the order Botrydiales.
