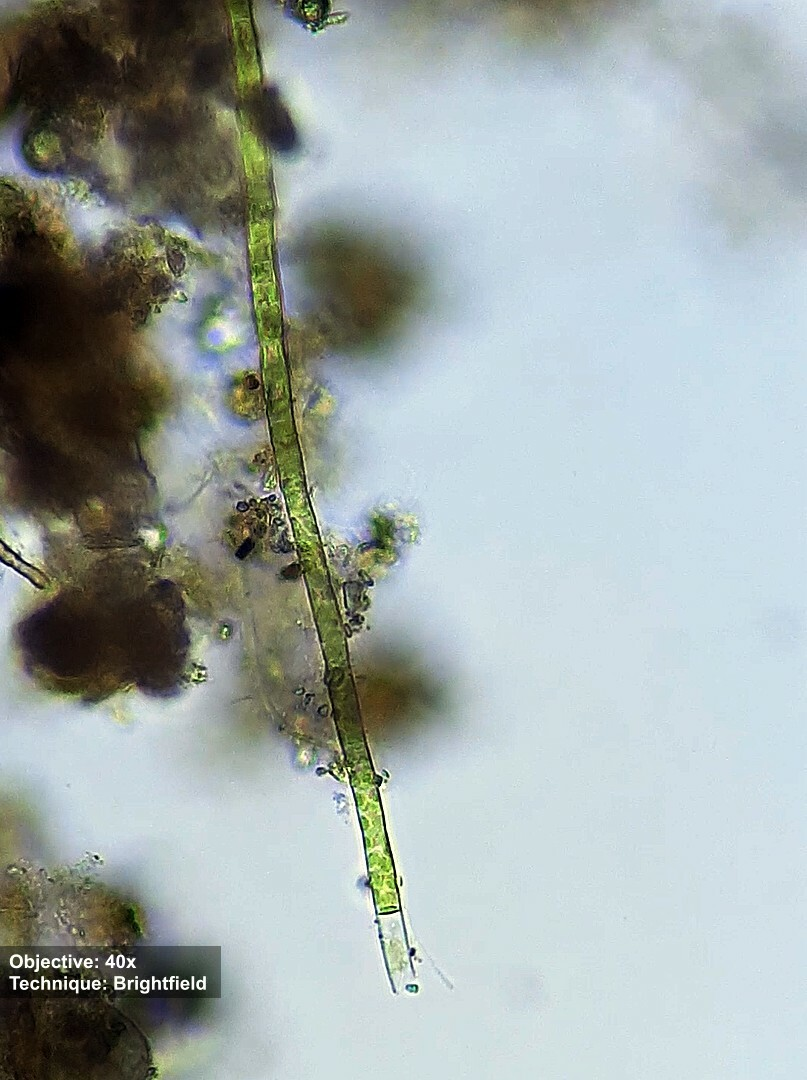

Scientific classification
- Domain: Eukaryota
- Clade: Diaphoretickes
- Clade: SAR
- Clade: Stramenopiles
- Phylum: Gyrista
- Subphylum: Ochrophytina
- Class: Xanthophyceae
- Order: Tribonematales
- Family: Tribonemataceae
- Genus: Tribonema; Derbès & Solier, 1851

= Tribonema =

Genus of algae

Tribonema is a genus of filamentous, freshwater yellow-green algae. The holotype for the genus is the species Tribonema bombycina (C.Agardh) Derbès & Solier.

Species recorded from Ireland include: Tribonema affine (G.S.West) G.S. West; T. minus (G.A. Klebs) Hazen and T. viride Pascher.
