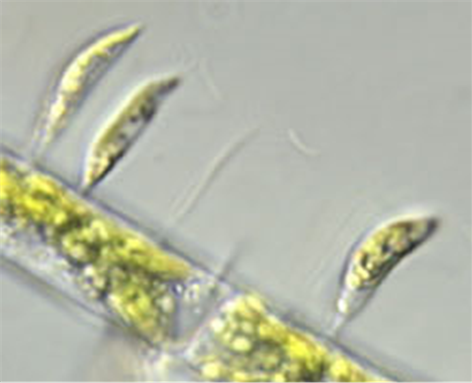
- Characium hookeri

Scientific classification
- Clade: Viridiplantae
- Division: Chlorophyta
- Class: Chlorophyceae
- Order: Sphaeropleales
- Family: Characiaceae
- Genus: Characium; A.Braun in Kützing, 1849

Type species
- Characium sieboldii A.Braun

Species
- See text

= Characium =

Genus of algae

Characium is a genus of green algae in the family Characiaceae. It is very commonly found in freshwater habitats, where it is attached to phytoplankton or zooplankton.

== Description ==
Characium consists of single or rarely clustered cells. They are attached to a plant or animal substrate (thus epiphytic or epizoic), via a stalk or a circular pad. The cells have diverse shapes, ranging from fusiform to club-shaped or spherical, and are variously straight, hooked, or S-shaped. Cells usually contain a single parietal chloroplast filling the cell, with a central pyrenoid. In some species, the chloroplasts fragment into multiple plastids, each with one pyrenoid. Mature cells have one nucleus (are uninucleate).

Characium reproduces asexually by zoospores. Zoospores have two flagella.

=== Identification ===
The genus Characium is similar to Characiopsis, a type of algae in the class Eustigmatophyceae. The two genera are very similar and have been confused in the past; however, Characium produces starch to store excess carbon and thus stains brown to purple in Lugol's iodine solution, while Characiopsis does not. Many other similar segregate genera have been named. These include Deuterocharacium, which differs in having chloroplasts without pyrenoids, and Characiopodium, with multinucleate mature cells.

Identification of species depends on the shapes and sizes of the cell body, as well as the stipe with which the body is attached.

== Species list ==
- C. acuminatum
- C. ambiguum
- C. angustum
- C. astipitatum
- C. braunii
- C. bulgariense
- C. cerassiforme
- C. conicum
- C. epipyxis
- C. giganteum
- C. groenlandicum
- C. guttula
- C. heteromorphum
- C. limneticum
- C. marinum
- C. nasutum
- C. obtusum
- C. ornithocephalum
- C. ovale
- C. polymorphum
- C. prodani
- C. pseudopyriforme
- C. pyriforme
- C. rostratum
- C. saccatum
- C. sieboldii
- C. strictum
- C. substrictum
- C. subulatum
- C. tenue
- C. terrestre
- C. urnigerum
- C. westianum
