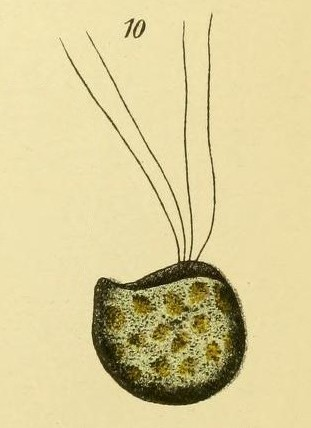
- Cymbomonas tetramitiformis

Scientific classification
- Kingdom: Plantae
- Division: Chlorophyta
- Class: Pyramimonadophyceae
- Order: Pyramimonadales
- Family: Pyramimonadaceae
- Genus: Cymbomonas; Schiller 1913

Species
- C. adriatica Schiller 1925; C. klebsii Schiller 1925; C. tetramitiformis Schiller 1913

= Cymbomonas =

Genus of algae

Cymbomonas is a genus of green algae in the order Pyramimonadales.
