= Mischococcus =

Scientific classification
- Domain: Eukaryota
- Clade: Sar
- Clade: Stramenopiles
- Division: Ochrophyta
- Class: Xanthophyceae
- Order: Mischococcales
- Family: Mischococcaceae; Pascher
- Genus: Mischococcus; Nägeli, 1849

Genus of algae

Mischococcus is a genus of algae, and is the only genus in the family Mischococcaceae.

The species of this genus are found in Europe.

Species:

- Mischococcus confervicola Nägeli
