= Characiellopsis =

Scientific classification
- Kingdom: Plantae
- Division: Chlorophyta
- Class: Chlorophyceae
- Order: Sphaeropleales
- Family: Characiaceae
- Genus: Characiellopsis; M.O.P.Iyengar, 1975

Type species
- Characiellopsis anophelesii M.O.P.Iyengar

Species
- Characiellopsis anophelesii; Characiellopsis skujae

Genus of algae

Characiellopsis is a genus of green algae in the family Characiaceae. Two species are known: Characiellopsis anophelesii and Characiellopsis skujae.

== Description ==
Characiellopsis consists of solitary cells that are elongate and attached to a substrate via a pad of mucilage. Cells contain a single central nucleus. Young cells contain a single chloroplast, while older cells contain multiple; each chloroplast has a single pyrenoid. Cells reproduce by 2-flagellated zoospores. These zoospore escape from the tip of the mother cell via a tear in the mother cell's wall.

== Species ==
Characiellopsis anophelesii consists of solitary cells that are attached to mosquito (Anopheles) larvae.

Characiellopsis skujae consists of solitary cells that are elongated to ovoid, attached to a surface via a thick stalk. The cell walls are very thick, and the tip of the cell has a refractive ring-shaped structure visible in light microscopy. Cells contain a single chloroplast filling the cell, each with a single pyrenoid. The apical ring structure is very distinctive, and it shares this characteristic with another taxon, Characium obtusum; the two species are probably synonymous.
