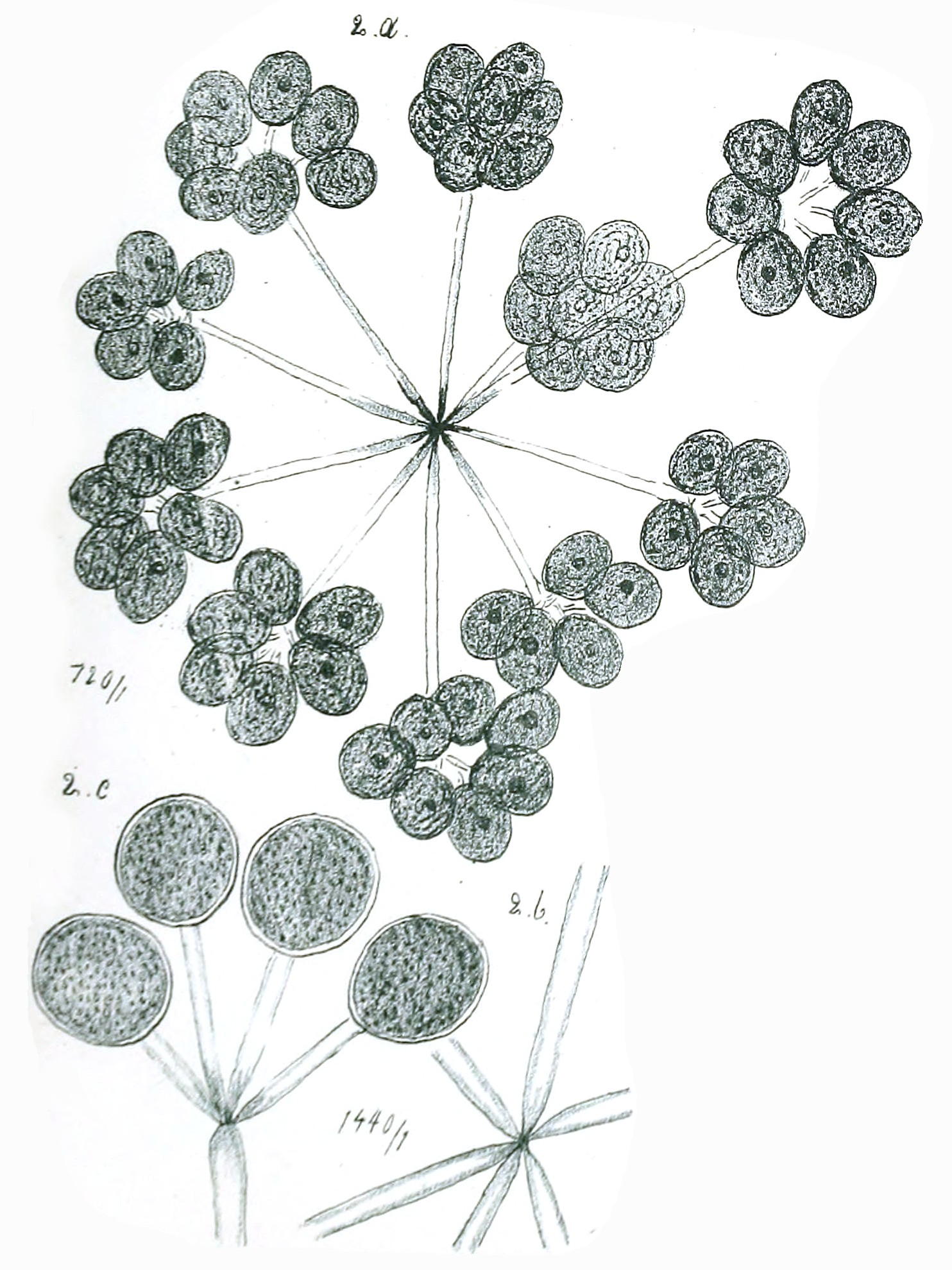

Scientific classification
- Kingdom: Plantae
- Division: Chlorophyta
- Class: Chlorophyceae
- Order: Sphaeropleales
- Family: Characiaceae
- Genus: Actidesmium; Reinsch

Type species
- Actidesmium hookeri Reinsch

Species
- Actidesmium hookeri; Actidesmium sphaericum

= Actidesmium =

Genus of algae

Actidesmium is a small genus of green algae in the family Characiaceae. It was described by the German phycologist Paul Friedrich Reinsch in 1875.

Actidesmium consists of microscopic colonies of numerous cells. Cells are in clusters of four, eight, or 16 at the end of long gelatinous strands, which are the remains of the old cell wall. One chloroplast is present, lacking a pyrenoid. Actidesmium reproduces by zoospores formed by successive division. Zoospores each have two flagella, and are released at the apex of the cell. After release, the mother cell gelatinizes and the zoospores mature into new vegetative cells.

Two species are known: Actidesmium hookeri and Actidesmium sphaericum (formerly known as Actidesmium globosum). The two differ in the size and shape of their cells, the latter being smaller and globose.

Actidesmium has been reported from freshwater habitats in North America and Europe, and is rare.
