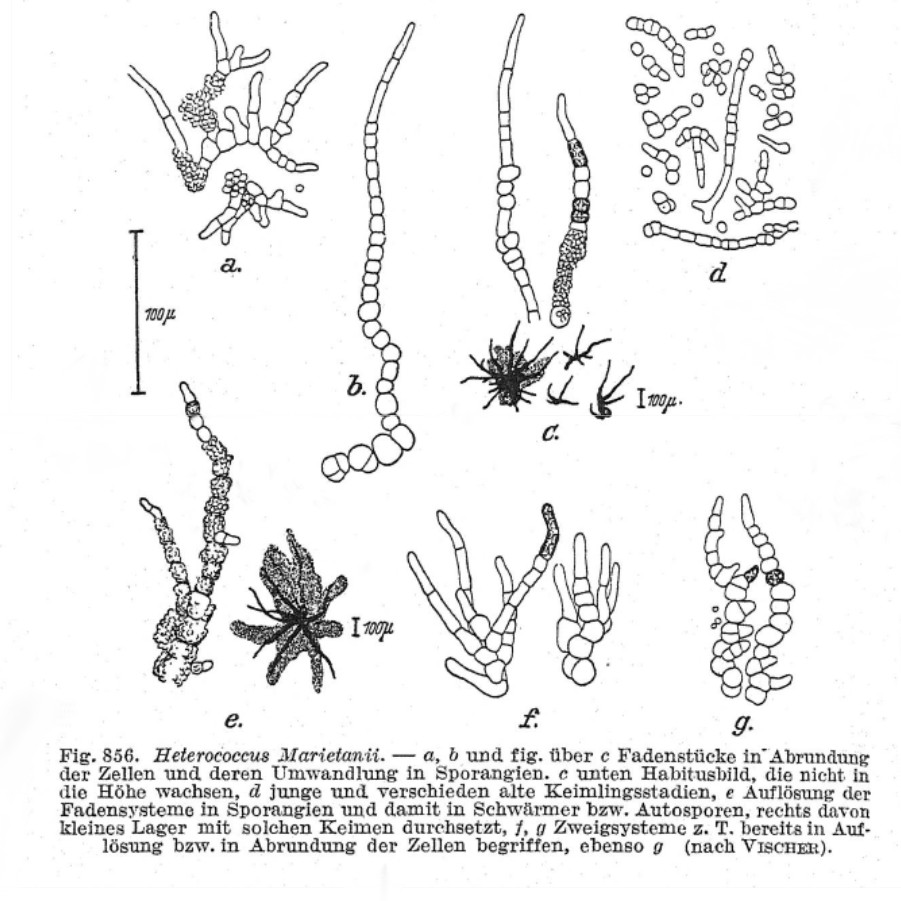
- Drawings of Heterococcus marietanii

Scientific classification
- Domain: Eukaryota
- Clade: Diaphoretickes
- Clade: SAR
- Clade: Stramenopiles
- Phylum: Gyrista
- Subphylum: Ochrophytina
- Class: Xanthophyceae
- Order: Tribonematales
- Family: Heteropediaceae
- Genus: Heterococcus; Chodat, 1908

Species
- See text

= Heterococcus =

Genus of algae

Heterococcus is a genus of yellow-green algae (xanthophytes) in the family Heteropediaceae. It is the only xanthophyte genus known to form lichens.

Pirula is regarded as a synonym.

== Species ==
- Heterococcus africanus
- Heterococcus akinetus
- Heterococcus anguinus
- Heterococcus arcticus
- Heterococcus botrys
- Heterococcus brevicellularis
- Heterococcus caespitosus
- Heterococcus canadensis
- Heterococcus capitatus
- Heterococcus chodatii
- Heterococcus clavatus
- Heterococcus conicus
- Heterococcus corniculatus
- Heterococcus crassulus
- Heterococcus curvatus
- Heterococcus curvirostrus
- Heterococcus dissociatus
- Heterococcus endolithicus
- Heterococcus erectus
- Heterococcus filiformis
- Heterococcus flavescens
- Heterococcus fontanus
- Heterococcus fuornensis
- Heterococcus furcatus
- Heterococcus gemmatus
- Heterococcus geniculatus
- Heterococcus granulatus
- Heterococcus implexus
- Heterococcus leptosiroides
- Heterococcus longicellularis
- Heterococcus mainxii
- Heterococcus marietanii
- Heterococcus mastigophorus
- Heterococcus maximus
- Heterococcus moniliformis
- Heterococcus nepalensis
- Heterococcus papillosus
- Heterococcus plectenchymaticus
- Heterococcus pleurococcoides
- Heterococcus polymorphus
- Heterococcus presolanensis
- Heterococcus protonematoides
- Heterococcus quadratus
- Heterococcus ramosissimus
- Heterococcus stellatus
- Heterococcus stigeoclonioides
- Heterococcus subterrestris
- Heterococcus tectiformis
- Heterococcus teleutosporoides
- Heterococcus tellii
- Heterococcus thermalis
- Heterococcus tiroliensis
- Heterococcus undulatus
- Heterococcus unguis
- Heterococcus vesiculosus
- Heterococcus virginis
- Heterococcus viridis
- Heterococcus zonatus
