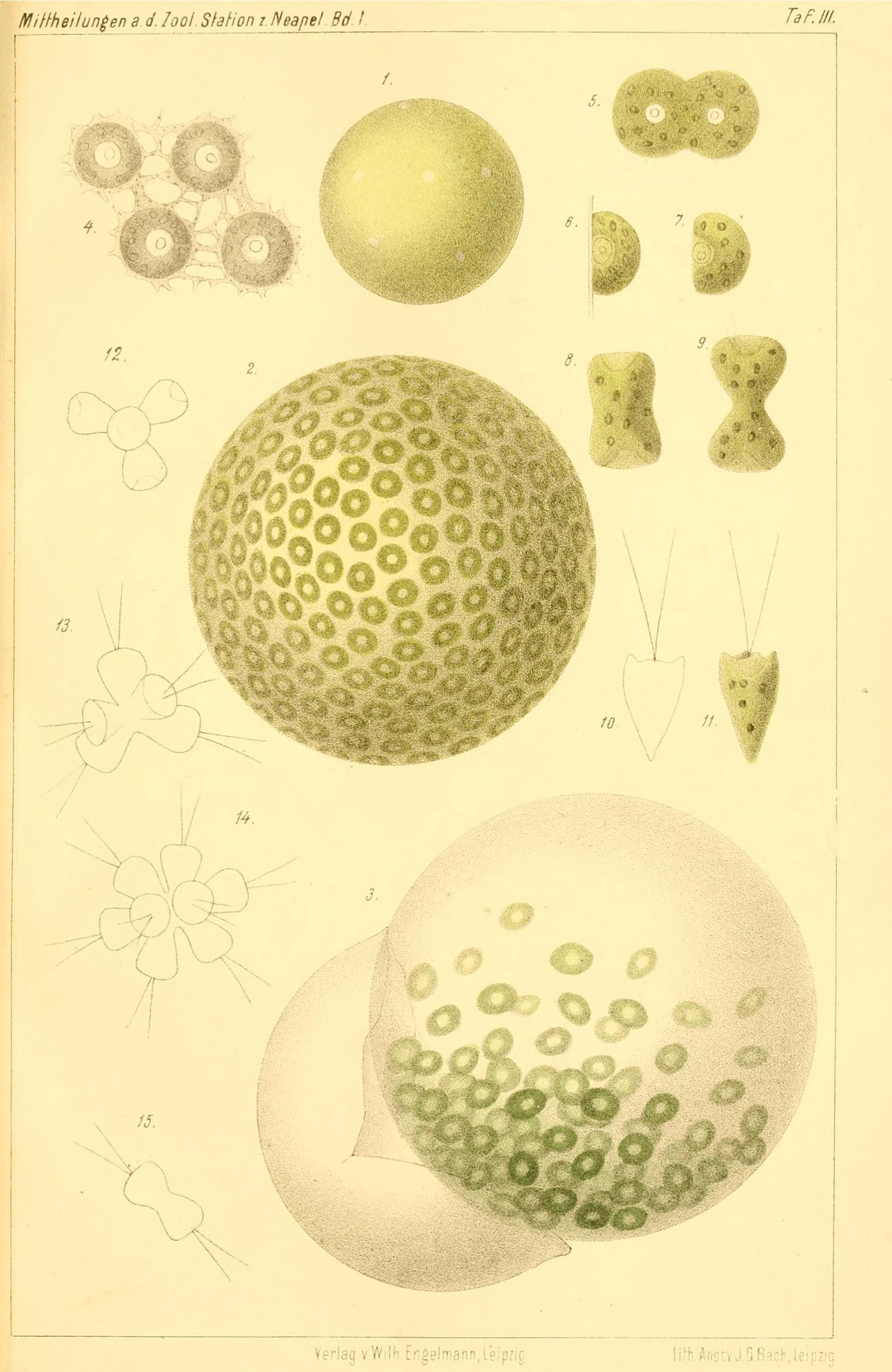
- Halosphaera viridis

Scientific classification
- Kingdom: Plantae
- Division: Chlorophyta
- Class: Pyramimonadophyceae
- Order: Pyramimonadales
- Family: Pyramimonadaceae
- Genus: Halosphaera; Schmitz 1879

Type species
- Halosphaera viridis Schmitz 1879

Species
- H. minor Ostenfeld; H. ovata Schütt; H. parkeae Boalch & Mommaerts; H. russellii Parke; H. viridis Schmitz 1878

= Halosphaera =

Genus of algae

Halosphaera is a genus of green algae in the order Pyramimonadales. Halosphaera is widely distributed in the plankton of oceans, and is found in both hemispheres.

Halosphaera consists of two life stages: a non-motile coccoid stage, called the phycoma stage (pl. phycomata), and a flagellated stage. The phycoma is spherical, up to 800 μm in diameter, with two layers of cell walls: The inner wall is pectin-like, while the outer wall is tough and sporopollenin-like. Mature phycomata contain a single nucleus and several numerous chloroplasts, in most species with pyrenoids.

Pterosperma divides asexually in the phycoma stage, forming a large number of flagellate swarmer cells. Swarmers have four long flagella which arise from a pit in the anterior surrounded by four lobes. Each contain a single parietal chloroplast with two to four pyrenoids, and an eyespot. The cell body is covered with several types organic scales, and the flagella are also covered with multiple layers of cells. Flagellate cells can also divide by fission.
