= Pseudoschroederia =

Scientific classification
- Kingdom: Plantae
- Division: Chlorophyta
- Class: Chlorophyceae
- Order: Sphaeropleales
- Family: Characiaceae
- Genus: Pseudoschroederia; E. Hegewald & E. Schnepf, 1986

Type species
- Pseudoschroederia robusta (Korshikov) E.Hegewald & E.Schnepf

Species
- Pseudoschroederia antillarum; Pseudoschroederia punctata; Pseudoschroederia robusta

Genus of algae

Pseudoschroederia is a genus of green algae in the family Characiaceae. It is planktonic in freshwater habitats, and probably has a cosmopolitan distribution. The genus Pseudoschroederia was circumscribed by Eberhard Hegewald and Eberhard Schnepf in 1986. The genus was distinguished from the similar Schroederia by being heteropolar and differing cell structure. However, some authors do not consider the genera to be separate.

Pseudoschroederia consists of solitary cells. Cells are spindle-shaped, straight or curved, 22–84 μm long. One end tapers into a spine-like point, while the other end is bluntly tipped. Cells contain one nucleus, a single parietal chloroplast and one or several pyrenoids with a starch sheath. Cells reproduce asexually by zoospores. Zoospores have two flagella and contractile vacuoles. Species are distinguished from one another by their overall shape and size.
