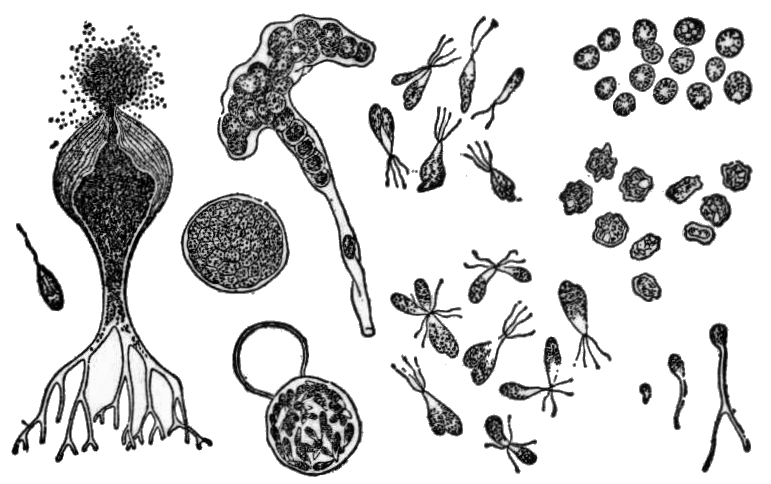
- Botrydium granulatum

Scientific classification
- Domain: Eukaryota
- Clade: Diaphoretickes
- Clade: SAR
- Clade: Stramenopiles
- Phylum: Gyrista
- Subphylum: Ochrophytina
- Class: Xanthophyceae
- Order: Botrydiales
- Family: Botrydiaceae
- Genus: Botrydium; Wallroth, 1815

Species
- Botrydium becherianum Vischer; Botrydium corniforme Vodeničarov; Botrydium cystosum Vischer; Botrydium divisum M. O. P. Iyengar; Botrydium granulatum (L.) Greville; Botrydium intermedium M. O. P. Iyengar ex A.R.Rao; Botrydium milleri Vodeničarov; Botrydium pachydermum V.V.Miller; Botrydium stoloniferum A.K.Mitra; Botrydium tuberosum M. O. P. Iyengar; Botrydium wallrothii Kützing

= Botrydium =

Genus of algae

Botrydium is a genus of thalloid algae. Specimens can reach around 2 mm in size and produce tetraspores.

== Species ==
Some currently recognised species:

- Botrydium becherianum
- Botrydium corniforme
- Botrydium cystosum
- Botrydium divisum
- Botrydium granulatum
- Botrydium intermedium
- Botrydium milleri
- Botrydium pachydermum
- Botrydium stoloniferum
- Botrydium tuberosum
- Botrydium wallrothii
