= Radiofilum =

- Radiofilum conjunctivum

Scientific classification
- Clade: Viridiplantae
- Division: Chlorophyta
- Class: Chlorophyceae
- Order: Sphaeropleales
- Family: Sphaeropleaceae
- Genus: Radiofilum; Schmidle, 1894

Type species
- Radiofilum conjunctivum Schmidle

Species
- Radiofilum conjunctivum; Radiofilum transversale

Genus of algae

Radiofilum is a genus of green algae in the class Chlorophyceae. It is a freshwater genus; they are often found in soft, boggy or acidic waters.

Radiofilum consists of unbranched filaments of cells, surrounded by a very thin mucilage layer. Cells are bead-like, spherical or compressed. The cell wall consists of two halves, and there is a ring around the middle of the cell where the two halves are joined. Cells contain a chloroplast is parietal and contains one or more pyrenoids.

The genus Radiofilum as currently circumscribed appears to be a polyphyletic grouping of species. Some work has been done to transfer species to other genera, including Interfilum and Flintia. The type species, Radiofilum conjunctivum, belongs to the class Trebouxiophyceae and is phylogenetically close to the genus Microthamnion.
