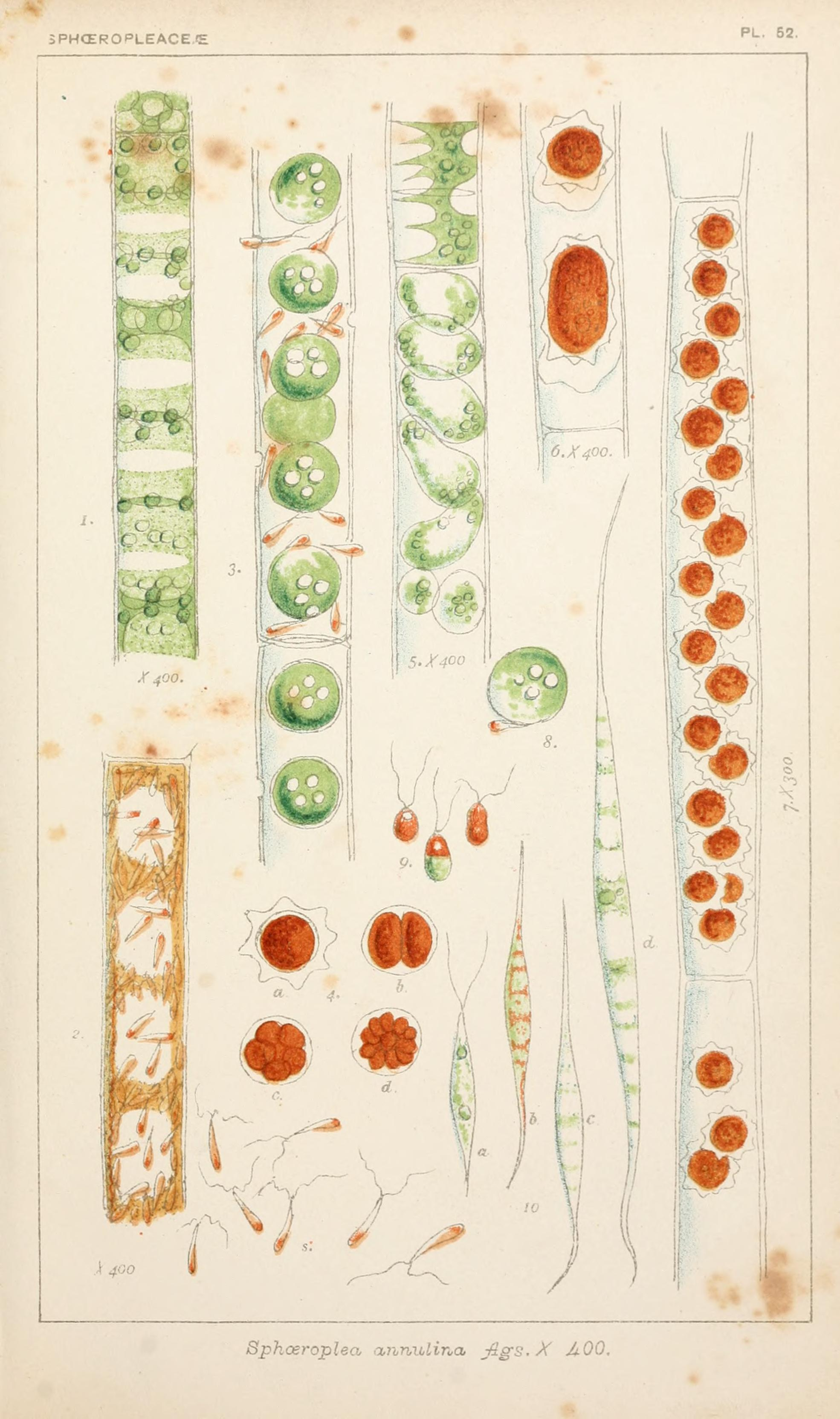
- Sphaeroplea annulina

Scientific classification
- Kingdom: Plantae
- Division: Chlorophyta
- Class: Chlorophyceae
- Order: Sphaeropleales
- Family: Sphaeropleaceae
- Genus: Sphaeroplea; C.Agardh

Species
- See text

= Sphaeroplea =

Genus of algae

Sphaeroplea is a genus of green algae in the family Sphaeropleaceae. It was first circumscribed by the Swedish botanist Carl Adolph Agardh in 1824.

== Description ==
Sphaeroplea consists of unbranched filaments of cells, one cell thick. Cells are usually 10–50 μm in diameter, but one variety can reach up to 170 μm in diameter. Cells are cylindrical, several times longer than wide, with a linear series of alternating vacuoles and cytoplasmic zones containing nuclei and chloroplasts. The chloroplasts are band-shaped, and contain several pyrenoids. Nuclei are typically in pairs.

== Reproduction ==
Sphaeroplea reproduces asexually and sexually. In asexual reproduction, the filaments break apart, although one species has been observed to produce zoospores that are biflagellate (i.e. with two flagella). Sexual reproduction is typically oogamous, where vegetative cells become reproductive cells without changing their shape. Female gametes are large, spherical and green, and are borne in one to several rows within the cell. Male gametes are typically produced on the same filament as female gametes, and are small and biflagellate.

After the gametes fuse, a zygote (termed an oospore) is formed. Zygotes develop a thick cell wall with ornamentation, and eventually turn reddish-orange before being released. The zygotes may last for an extended period of time in a desiccated state. During germination, the zygote becomes four biflagellate cells that attach to a substrate, lose their flagella, and develop into a new filament.

== Habitat and distribution ==
Sphaeroplea occurs in temporary freshwater habitats such as roadside ditches, margins of ponds, and vleis. It tends to prefer calcareous habitats. It has been recorded from all continents except Antarctica, but not very frequently. Its occurrence is ephemeral; it tends to appear abundantly in one spot, then disappear for many years. When abundant, it can impart a reddish discoloration to the water with its abundant reddish-orange oospores.

== Species ==
According to AlgaeBase, the following species are accepted:

- Sphaeroplea africana
- Sphaeroplea annulina
- Sphaeroplea chapmanii
- Sphaeroplea fragilis
- Sphaeroplea robusta
- Sphaeroplea soleirolii
- Sphaeroplea striatocristata
- Sphaeroplea tenuis
- Sphaeroplea tricarinata
- Sphaeroplea willmanii

One fossil species is known:

- †Sphaeroplea miocenica

Species are distinguished from each other by characteristics of the oospores, such as their shape and ornamentation.
