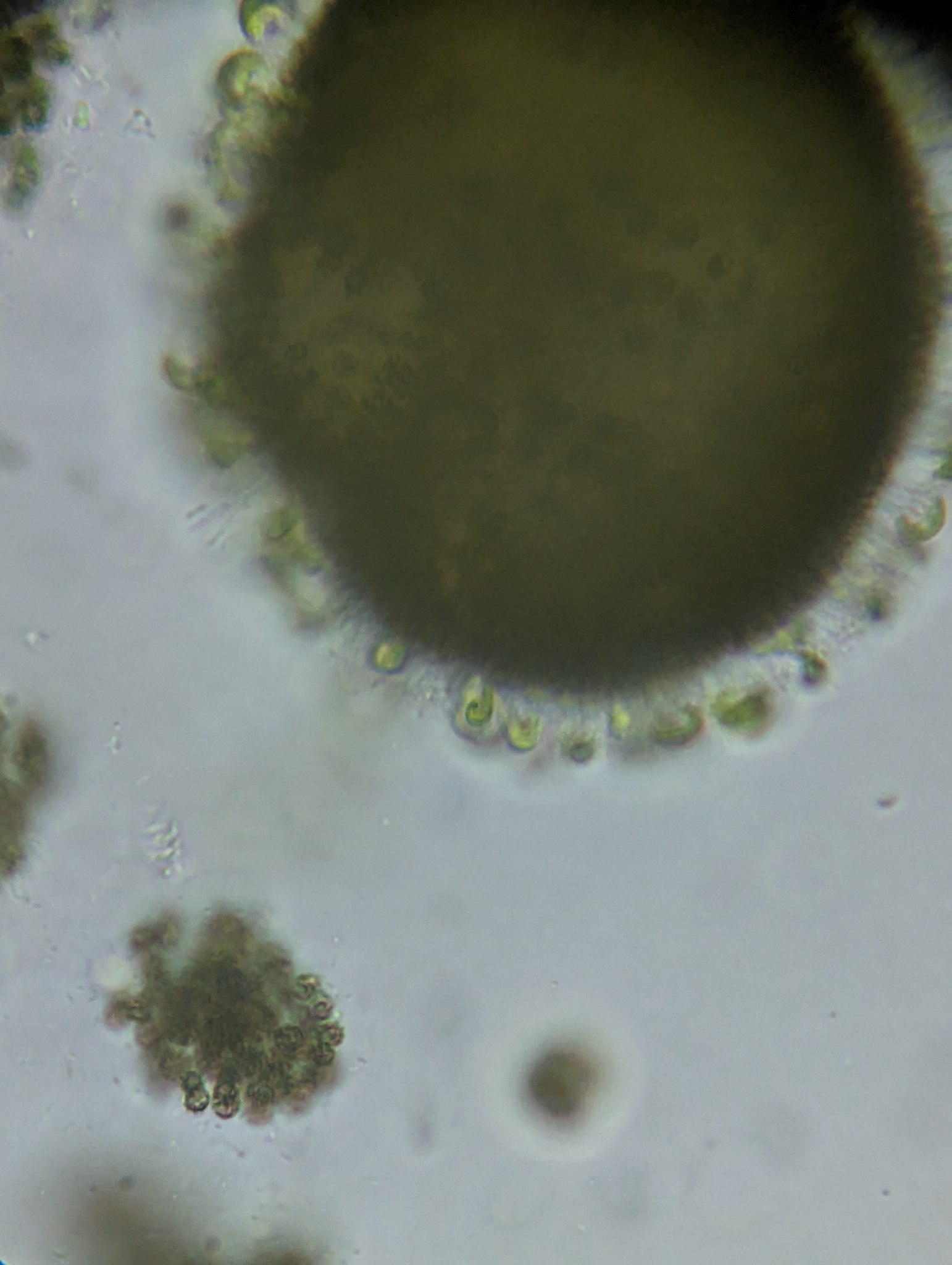
- Characiopsis curvata

Scientific classification
- Domain: Eukaryota
- Clade: Diaphoretickes
- Clade: SAR
- Clade: Stramenopiles
- Phylum: Gyrista
- Subphylum: Ochrophytina
- Class: Xanthophyceae
- Order: Mischococcales
- Family: Characiopsidaceae; Pascher

= Characiopsidaceae =

Family of algae

Characiopsidaceae is a family of algae belonging to the order Mischococcales.

Selected genera:

- Characidiopsis Pascher
- Characiopsis Borzì
- Chlorothecium Borzì
