= Margination =

Margination may refer to:

- a sign in leukocyte extravasation
- Marginate conch (Margistrombus marginatus), a sea snail species found in the Andaman Sea
- Marginated damsel (Dascyllus marginatus), a fish species found in the Western Indian Ocean
- Marginated tortoise (Testudo marginata), a tortoise species found in Greece, Italy and the Balkans
