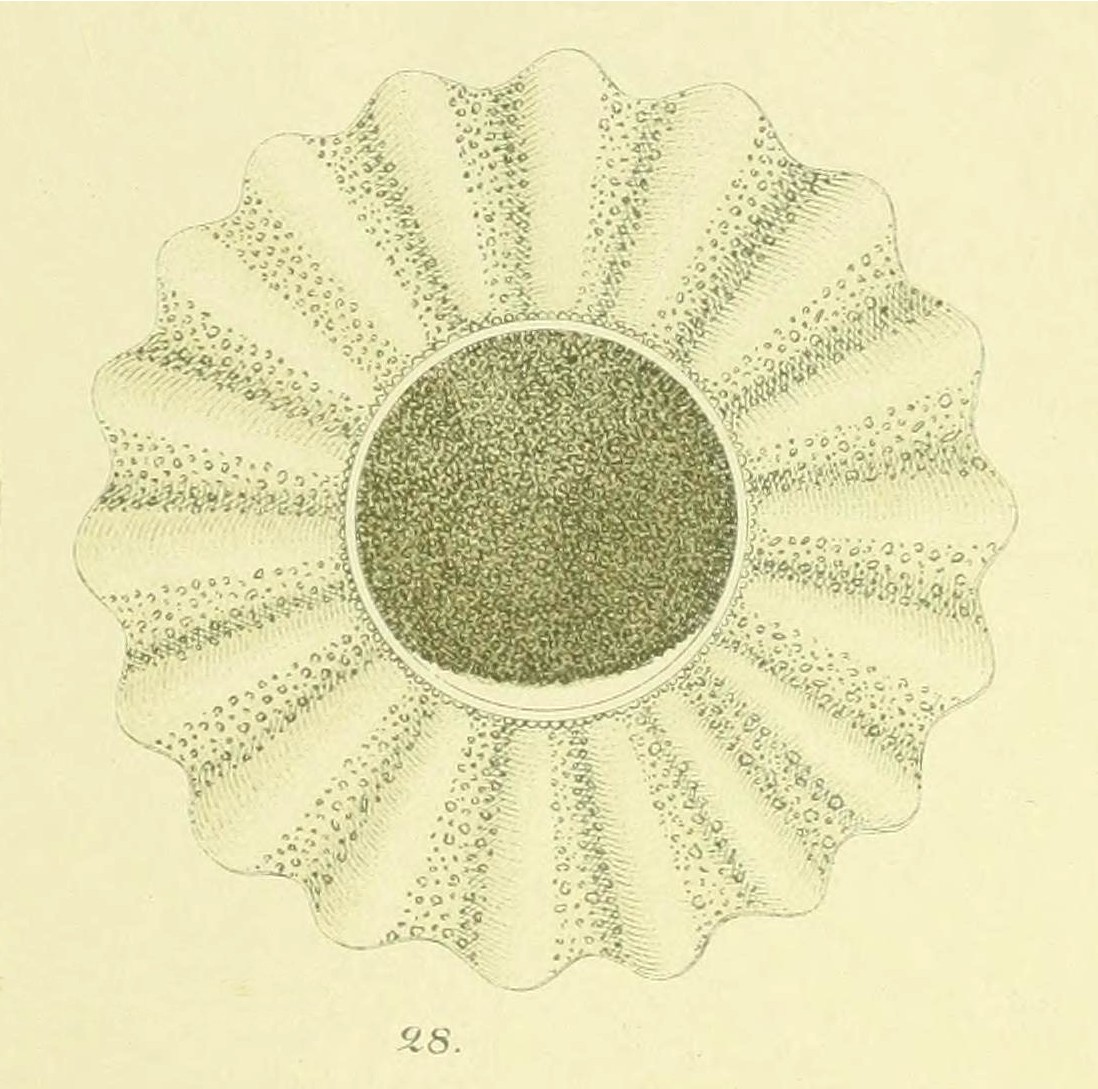

Scientific classification
- Kingdom: Plantae
- Division: Chlorophyta
- Class: Pyramimonadophyceae
- Order: Pyramimonadales
- Family: Pterospermataceae
- Genus: Pterosperma; Pouchet 1893

Type species
- Pterosperma rotundum Pouchet

Species
- P. citriforme Parke; P. cristatum Schiller 1925; P. cuboides Gaarder 1954; P. dictyon (Joergensen 1899) Ostenfeld 1901; P. eurypteron Parke; P. hemisphaericum Meunier 1910; P. inornatum Parke; P. joergensenii Schiller 1925; P. marginatum Gaarder 1954; P. michaelsarsii (Gaarder) Parke & Boalch; P. moebii (Jørgensen 1899) Ostenfeld 1901; P. nationalis Lohmann 1904; P. ornatum Schiller 1925; P. parallelum Gaardner 1938; P. polygonum Ostenfeld 1902; P. porosum Parke; P. rotondum Pouchet 1893; P. undulatum Ostenfeld 1902; P. vanhoeffenii (Jørgensen 1900) Ostenfeld 1899

= Pterosperma =

Genus of algae

Pterosperma is a genus of green algae in the order Pyramimonadales. It is found in the plankton of all oceans.

Pterosperma consists of two life stages: a non-motile coccoid stage, called the phycoma stage (pl. phycomata), and a flagellated stage. The phycoma is spherical, 14–230 μm in diameter, with two layers of cell walls. The inner wall is delicate, while the outer wall is tough and bears one or more wings protruding out, dividing the cell into two halves or into multiple polygonal areas. Mature phycomata contain a single nucleus and several chloroplasts, each with a pyrenoid.

Pterosperma divides asexually in the phycoma stage, forming a large number of flagellate swarmer cells. Swarmers have four long flagella (several times longer than the cell body), and contain a single chloroplast with a pyrenoid, but no eyespot. The cell body is covered with three layers of organic scales, and the flagella are also covered with multiple layers of cells.

The life cycle of Pterosperma is associated with the lunar cycle. The release of swarmers coincides typically occurs within two to three days of the new moon or full moon.
