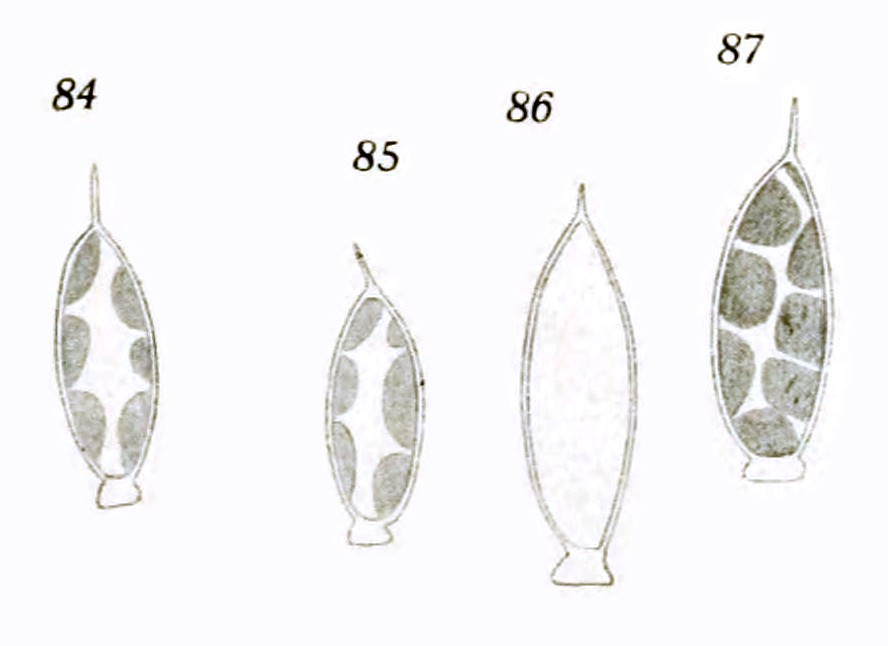
- Pseudochlorothecium spiniferum

Scientific classification
- Clade: Viridiplantae
- Division: Chlorophyta
- Class: Chlorophyceae
- Order: Chlamydomonadales
- Family: incertae sedis
- Genus: Pseudochlorothecium; Korshikov, 1953

Type species
- Pseudochlorothecium mucigenum Korshikov

Species
- Pseudochlorothecium mucigenum; Pseudochlorothecium spiniferum

= Pseudochlorothecium =

Genus of algae

Pseudochlorothecium is a genus of green algae in the order Chlamydomonadales.
