= Marginatum =

Marginatum, a Latin adjective meaning having a distinct margin (marginated), may refer to:

- Erythema marginatum, pink rings on the trunk and inner surfaces of the limbs which come and go for as long as several months
- Keratoacanthoma centrifugum marginatum, a cutaneous condition characterized by multiple tumors growing in a localized area
