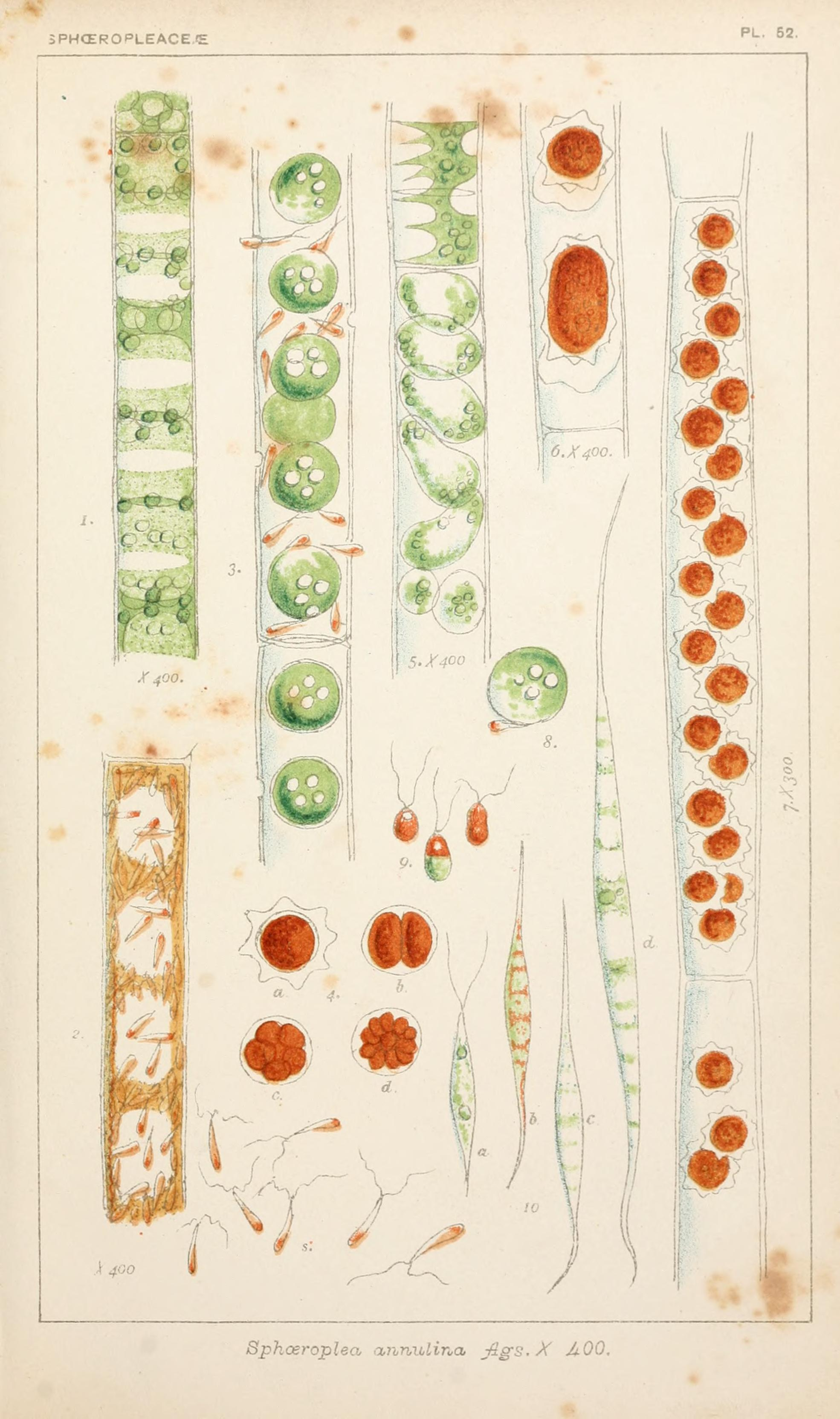
- British fresh-water algae, exclusive of Desmidieae and Diatomaceae (1882-1884)

Scientific classification
- Kingdom: Plantae
- Division: Chlorophyta
- Class: Chlorophyceae
- Order: Sphaeropleales
- Family: Sphaeropleaceae; Kützing, 1849

Genera
- Atractomorpha; Characiopodium; Parallela; Radiofilum; Sphaeroplea

= Sphaeropleaceae =

Family of algae

Sphaeropleaceae is a family of green algae in the order Sphaeropleales.

The Sphaeropleaceae consists of solitary cells or filaments of cells. They are coenocytic, and reproduce asexually via zoospores or sexually via anisogamy or oogamy.

The family has had a convoluted taxonomic history. Depending on the author, it has been placed in one of many orders including Ulotrichales or Chaetophorales. Currently, it is placed in its own order, the Sphaeropleales. It appears to be the sister group to the rest of the families in its order. It also differs from the other families in the ultrastructure of the basal bodies of their flagella.
