= Chlorogloea =

Scientific classification
- Domain: Bacteria
- Phylum: Cyanobacteria
- Class: Cyanophyceae
- Order: Chroococcales
- Family: Entophysalidaceae
- Genus: Chlorogloea; Wille, 1900

Genus of bacteria

Chlorogloea is a genus of cyanobacteria belonging to the family Entophysalidaceae.

The genus has cosmopolitan distribution.

Species:

- Chlorogloea conferta
- Chlorogloea microcystoides Geitler
- Chlorogloea purpurea Geitler, 1928
- Chlorogloea tuberculosa (Hansgirg) Wille, 1902
