= Atractomorpha (alga) =

Scientific classification
- Kingdom: Plantae
- Division: Chlorophyta
- Class: Chlorophyceae
- Order: Sphaeropleales
- Family: Sphaeropleaceae
- Genus: Atractomorpha; L.R.Hoffman

Type species
- Atractomorpha echinata L.R.Hoffman

Species
- Atractomorpha echinata; Atractomorpha porcata

Genus of algae

Atractomorpha is a genus in the Sphaeropleaceae, a family of green algae. The genus name is derived from Greek and means "spindle-shaped" or "arrow-shaped", and refers to the shape of the cells.

== Description ==
Atractomorpha consists of solitary cells. Cells are variable in size, but range from 25 μm to 6 mm in length. They are usually spindle-shaped, with two sharply pointed ends, but sometimes may develop three- or four-pointed cells. Cells are initially uninucleate (with one cell nucleus), but as the cell develops it becomes multinucleate; the cytoplasm is separated by large vacuoles into zones each containing chloroplasts and nuclei. Chloroplasts are ring-shaped bands or diffusely net-like.

Reproduction in Atractomorpha occurs asexually or sexually. In asexual reproduction, zoospores develop from vegetative cells, or less commonly aplanospores. Zoospores are relatively large, initially spindle-shaped but becoming pyriform or ovate. They are biflagellate but lose their flagella after setting, at which point they develop into vegetative cells. In sexual reproduction, gametangia develop from vegetative cells; they may be separate male or female gametangia, or in one species, bisexual. Male gametes are biflagellate, and female gametes are biflagellate or non-flagellate, depending on the species. The resulting zygotes from fertilization are initially surrounded by a thin membrane, later developing a thick wall and often an orange-red color.

Two species of Atractomorpha are known, Atractomorpha echinata and Atractomorpha porcata. The two present similar vegetative cells, but can be distinguished by their reproductive characteristics. Individual cells of A. echinata typically produce either male or female gametes but not both, while cells A. porcata produces both male and female gametes. Additionally, A. echinata is typically anisogamous while A. porcata is typically oogamous, and their zygote walls have different ornamentations.

== Habitat ==
Atractomorpha has been recorded only a few times, mainly from soil isolates. It occurs in shallow, temporary freshwater pools, and has been recorded from California, Texas, Australia, Namibia, and Hungary.
