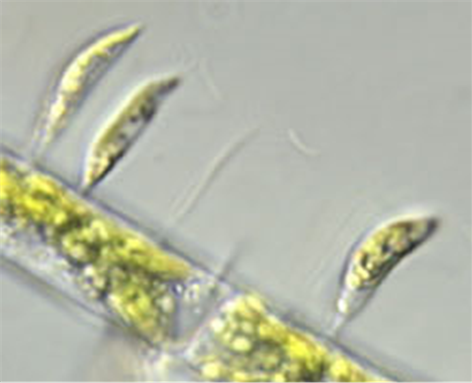
- Characium hookeri

Scientific classification
- Kingdom: Plantae
- Division: Chlorophyta
- Class: Chlorophyceae
- Order: Sphaeropleales
- Family: Characiaceae (Nägeli) Wittrock, 1872

Genera
- See text.

= Characiaceae =

Family of algae

Characiaceae is a family of green algae in the order Sphaeropleales. It contains epiphytic or planktonic algae that are unicellular or colonial. The cells are heteropolar, with basal and apical ends having different shapes. The daughter cells are often retained in the cell wall of the old mother cell, whose cell wall becomes gelatinized.

== Taxonomy ==
The taxonomy of Characiaceae has undergone significant revision in the last century. Characiaceae once included genera such as Schroederia, but that circumscription made the family polyphyletic, so many of those genera have been transferred to other families. However, the taxonomic affiliation of the type species of the genus Characium (C. sieboldii) is still unclear, which necessitates further revision of the family.

As of March 2022, AlgaeBase accepted the following genera:

- Acrochasma Korshikov – 1 species
- Actidesmium Reinsch – 2 species
- Bicuspidellopsis Korshikov – 1 species
- Characiella Schmidle – 1 species
- Characiellopsis M.O.P.Iyengar – 2 species
- Characium A. Braun – 51 species
- Craniocystis – 1 species
- Deuterocharacium Petrý – 2 species
- Korshikoviella P.C.Silva – 5 species
- Lambertia Korshikov – 1 species
- Lanceola F.Hindák – 1 species
- Marthea Pascher – 1 species
- Pseudoschroederia Hegewald & Schnepf – 3 species
