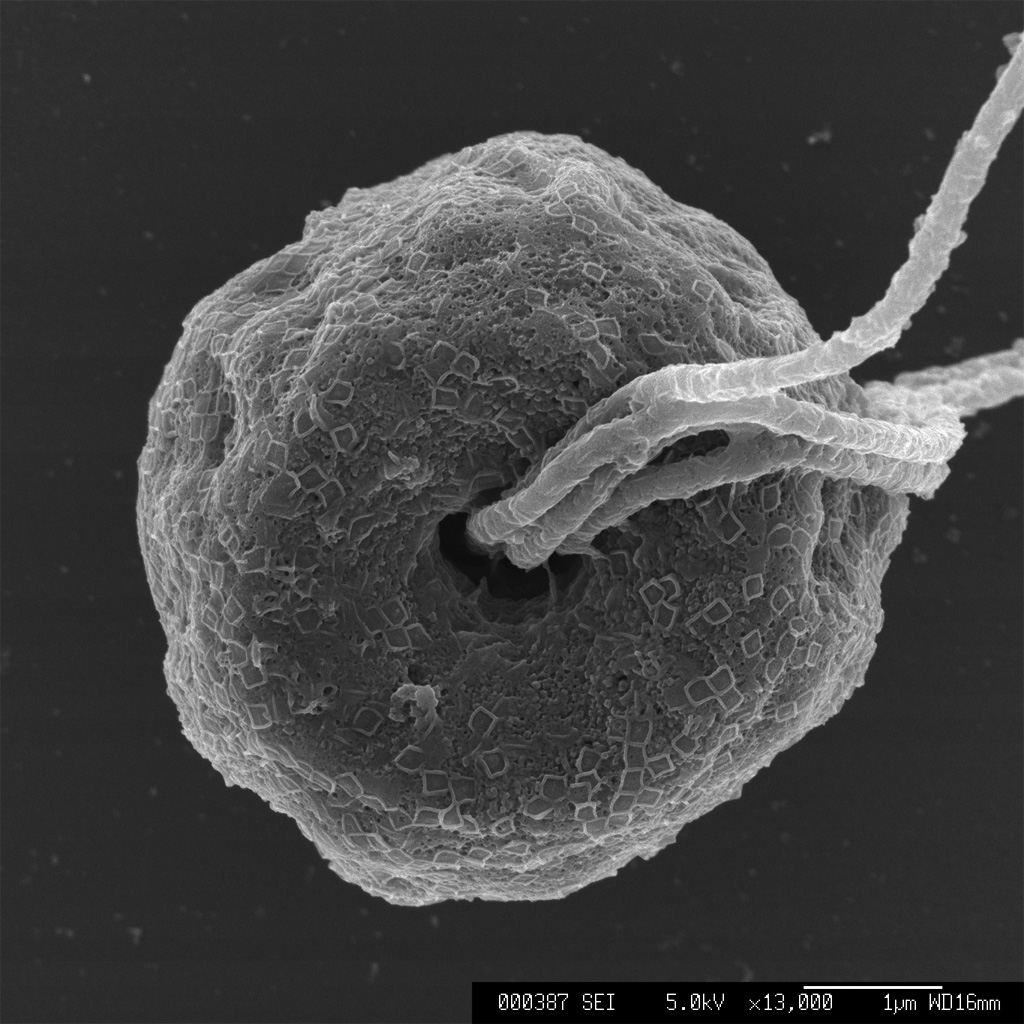
- Flagellar pit of Pyramimonas sp. scale bar = 1.0 μm

Scientific classification
- Kingdom: Plantae
- Division: Chlorophyta
- Class: Pyramimonadophyceae
- Order: Pyramimonadales
- Family: Pyramimonadaceae

Genera
- See text

= Pyramimonadaceae =

Family of algae

Pyramimonadaceae is a family of green algae.

== Genera ==
The following genera are considered valid:

- Angulomonas
- Coccopterum
- Cymbomonas
- Kuzminia
- Pocillomonas
- Prasinochloris
- Protoaceromonas
- Protochroomonas
- Pyramimonas
- Streptomonas
- Tasmanites
- Trichloris

Prasinopapilla is considered to have uncertain taxonomic status. Schilleriomonas is a synonym of Cymbomonas.
