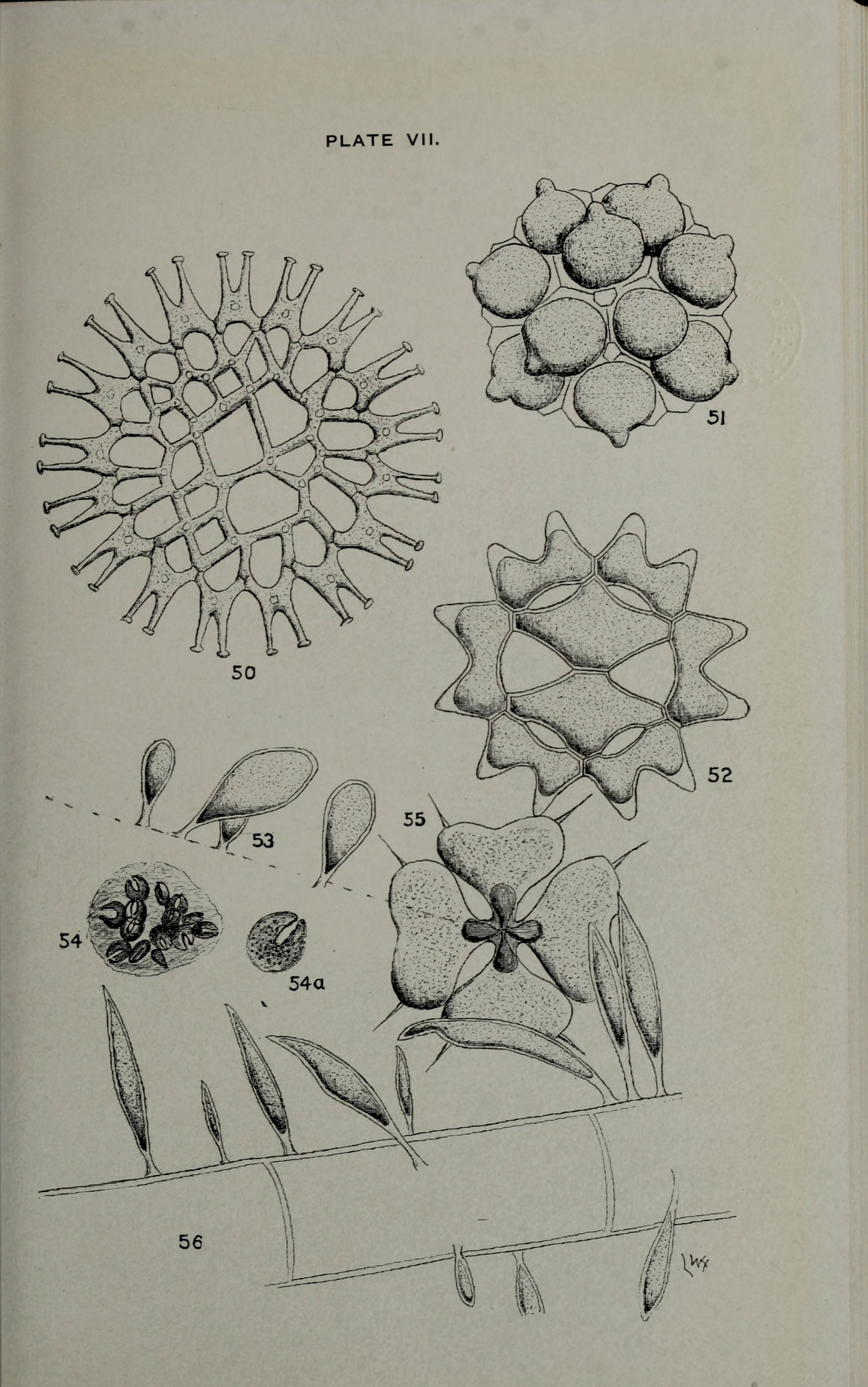
- (56?) Characiopsis naegelii

Scientific classification
- Domain: Eukaryota
- Clade: Diaphoretickes
- Clade: SAR
- Clade: Stramenopiles
- Phylum: Gyrista
- Subphylum: Ochrophytina
- Class: Xanthophyceae
- Order: Mischococcales
- Family: Characiopsidaceae
- Genus: Characiopsis; Borzì 1895

Species
- Characiopsis acuta (A.Braun) Borzì, 1895; Characiopsis africanus F.E.Fritsch & M.F.Rich; Characiopsis aquilonaris Skuja; Characiopsis avis Pascher, 1939; Characiopsis borziana Lemmermann; Characiopsis cedercreutzii Pascher, 1938; Characiopsis curvata (G.M.Smith) Skuja, 1948; Characiopsis cylindrica (F.D.Lambert) Lemmermann, 1914; Characiopsis elegans Ettl; Characiopsis lilloensis Conrad, 1954; Characiopsis longipes (Braun) Borzì, 1895; Characiopsis microcysticola Skuja; Characiopsis minor Pascher, 1925; Characiopsis minuta (A.Braun) Borzì, 1895; Characiopsis minutissima Pascher; Characiopsis naegelii (A.Braun) Lemmermann, 1914; Characiopsis pyriformis (A.Braun) Borzì, 1895; Characiopsis saccata N.Carter, 1919; Characiopsis sphagnicola Pascher; Characiopsis sublinearis Pascher; Characiopsis subulata (A.Braun) Borzì, 1895; Characiopsis turgida West & G.S.West, 1903; Characiopsis umbilicata Skuja

= Characiopsis =

Genus of algae

Characiopsis is a genus of yellow-green algae in the family Characiopsidaceae.
