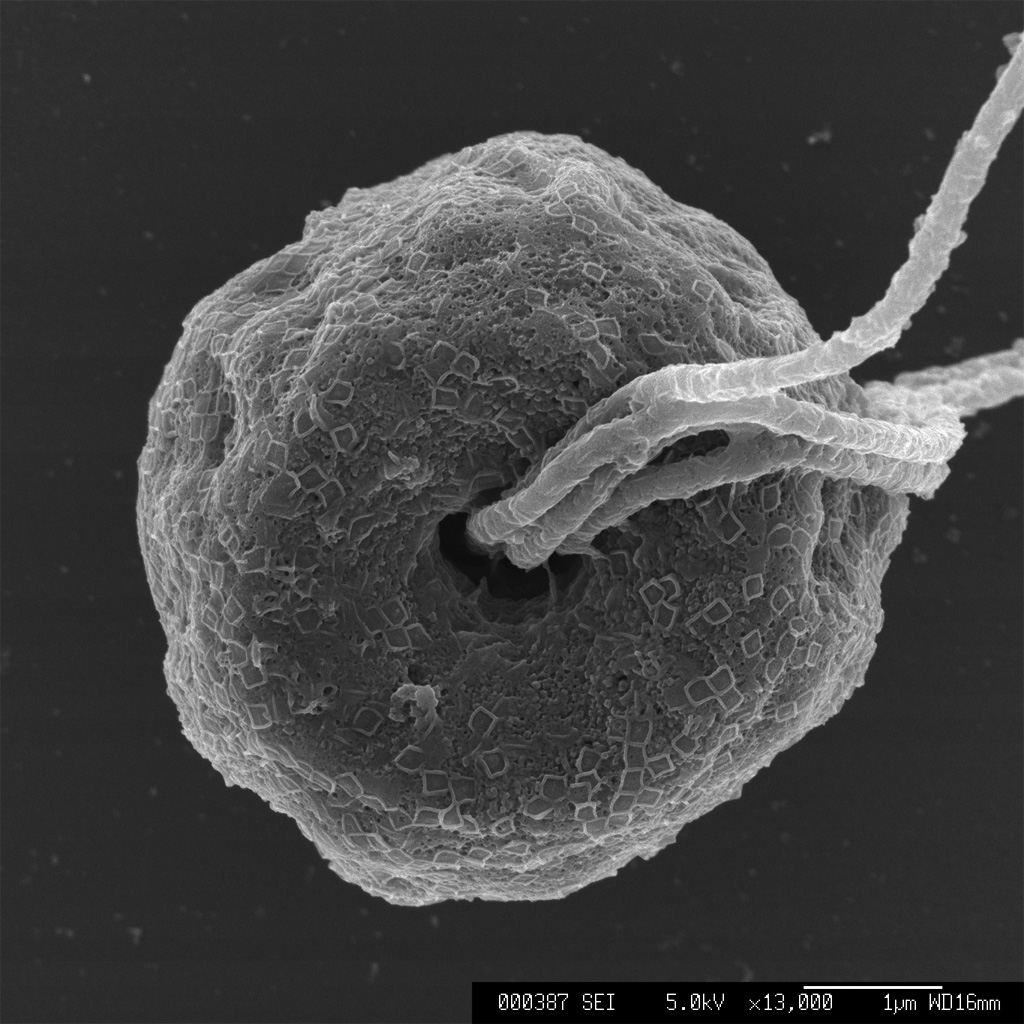
- Pyramimonas sp.

Scientific classification
- Kingdom: Plantae
- Division: Chlorophyta
- Class: Pyramimonadophyceae; Moestrup & Daugbjerg
- Order: Pyramimonadales; Chadefaud

Families
- Polyblepharidaceae Dangeard 1888; Pterospermataceae Lohmann 1904; Pyramimonadaceae Korshikov 1938

= Pyramimonadales =

Order of algae

Pyramimonadales are an order of green algae in the Chlorophyta, the only order in the class Pyramimonadophyceae. The chloroplasts of phototrophic euglenids probably came from endosymbiosis with a member of this order.

== Taxonomy ==
- Family Polyblepharidaceae Dangeard 1888
  - Genus Amphoraemonas Szabados 1948
  - Genus Chloraster Ehrenberg 1848 non Haworth 1824
  - Genus Gyromitus Skuja 1939
  - Genus Korschikoffia Pascher 1927
  - Genus Polyblepharides Dangeard 1888
  - Genus Printziella Skvortzov 1958
  - Genus Stephanoptera Dangeard 1910
  - Genus Sycamina van Tieghem 1880
- Family Pterospermataceae Lohmann 1904
  - Genus Polyasterias Meunier 1910
  - Genus Pterosperma Pouchet 1893
- Family Pyramimonadaceae Korshikov 1938 [Halosphaeraceae Haeckel 1894]
  - Genus Angulomonas Skvortzov 1968
  - Genus Coccopterum Silva 1970
  - Genus Cymbomonas Schiller 1913
  - Genus Halosphaera Schmitz 1879
  - Genus Kuzminia Skvortzov 1958
  - Genus Pocillomonas Steinecke 1926
  - Genus Prasinochloris Belcher 1966
  - Genus Protoaceromonas Skvortzov 1968
  - Genus Protochroomonas Skvortzov 1968
  - Genus Pyramimonas Schmarda 1849
  - Genus Tasmanites E.T.Newton
  - Genus Trichloridella Silva 1970
