= Pleurocapsales =

Scientific classification
- Domain: Bacteria
- Kingdom: Bacillati
- Phylum: Cyanobacteriota
- Class: Cyanophyceae
- Order: Pleurocapsales; Geitler

Families
- Dermocarpellaceae Ginsburg-Ardré ex Christensen; Hydrococcaceae Kützing; Hyellaceae Borzi; Xenococcaceae Ercegović

Order of bacteria

The Pleurocapsales are an order of coccooid cyanobacteria. Pleurocapsales are characterized by having boocytes, specialized cells where multiple fission takes place.

Their ecology is mainly endolytic and calcareous, they are found inside rocks and in low light conditions. Pleurocapsales were thought to be related to Chroococcidiopsis but recent work with phylogenetics of the 16S rDNA gene has shown that Chroococcidiopsis belongs to its own order Chroococcidiopsidales.

Some genera within Pleurocapsales form pseudo-ramifications such as Pleurocapsa sp., Odorella sp, and all the genera within the Hyellaceae family.

Historically, the order Pleurocapsales has been one of the least studied orders of cyanobacteria, due to its endolithic ecology making them difficult to observe.

Most recently, the order Pleurocapsales has been subsumed within the order Chroococcales.
