= UTEX 3222 =

Cyanobacterium aponinum UTEX 3222

Scientific classification
- Domain: Bacteria
- Kingdom: Bacillati
- Phylum: Cyanobacteriota
- Class: Cyanophyceae
- Order: Chroococcales
- Family: Cyanobacteriaceae
- Genus: Cyanobacterium
- Species: C. aponinum
- Strain: C. a. UTEX 3222

Trionomial name
- Cyanobacterium aponinum UTEX 3222

Synonyms
- Cyanobacterium aponinum var. "Vulcano 2"

Cyanobacteria strain

UTEX 3222 (informally, Chonkus) is a strain of the species Cyanobacterium aponinum, that was discovered off the coast of Baia di Levante, Italy. This cyanobacteria exhibits fast, high density, unicellular, planktonic growth while displaying quick settling rates in liquid. With the addition of its cyanobacterial photosynthetic function and its high carbon biomass composition, UTEX 3222 seems potentially useful for atmospheric CO_{2} sequestration and optimizing bioproduction within industry.

== Characteristics ==
UTEX 3222 demonstrates fast growth on solid, BG-11 freshwater medium, with a wide tolerance for growing conditions. Optimal growth rate has been achieved at a temperature of 45 °C, a temperature somewhat higher than used for other cyanobacteria models. A pH of 6.5-9.8 was tolerated by UTEX 3222 with the fastest exponential growth found at pH 6.5 and highest cell density at pH 8. Moderate salinity (10g/L NaCl) produced fastest growth, yet UTEX 3222 exhibited high salt tolerance. In addition, an irradiance of 1,500 μE is tolerated but growth rates reach capacity at 500 μE. In optimal conditions, UTEX 3222 has displayed a fast doubling time of 2.35 ± 0.10 hours. As well, UTEX 3222 grows to high density (>31 g/L biomass dry weight after 12 days) in batch culture, producing larger colonies than record setting UTEX 3154.

=== Biomass characterization ===
Extracellular polysaccharides (EPS) and storage granules are common carbon storage structures within cyanobacteria. These structures appear more prominent in size and number in UTEX 3222, compared to the high-density growing cyanobacteria, UTEX 3154. These structural differences account for UTEX 3222's higher carbon content as revealed in biomass composition analysis and C/H/N elemental analysis.

== Phenotype ==
In liquid cultures, UTEX 3222 aggregates into tight pellets within hours and settles quickly. The biomass of UTEX 3222 settles faster than the comparison strain, UTEX 3154, with a gravitational sinking velocity 2.16x quicker. The difference in sinking velocity is primarily due to UTEX 3222's greater cell volume rather than buoyant density. The dramatic difference in settling overnight and the speed at which UTEX 3222 forms a supernatant, cannot fully be explained by sinking velocity, indicating there are other factors involved such as cell aggregation.

== History ==
Cyanobacterium aponinum UTEX 3222 was discovered in 2024 when Schubert et al. explored shallow volcanic seeps off the coast of Baia di Levante in Vulcano Island, Italy. The team was investigating illuminated marine areas with high CO_{2} levels, hoping to find organisms that had evolved enhanced fitness, as adaptations would not need to focus on limitations in CO_{2} availability. The closest known relative to UTEX 3222 is Cyanobacterium aponinum PCC 10605, yet the whole clade remains relatively unstudied.
