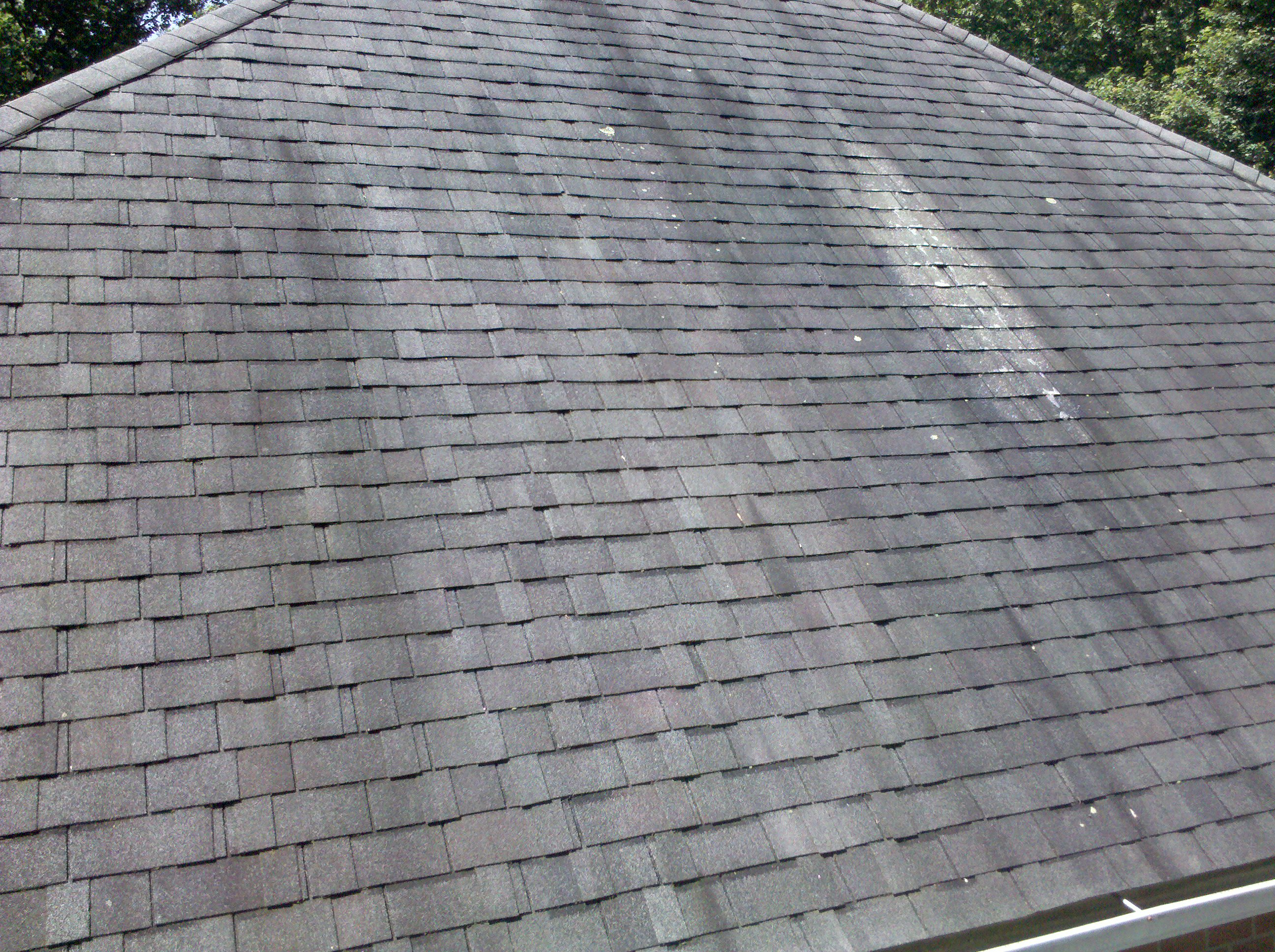

Scientific classification
- Domain: Bacteria
- Kingdom: Bacillati
- Phylum: Cyanobacteriota
- Class: Cyanophyceae
- Order: Chroococcales
- Family: Chroococcaceae
- Genus: Gloeocapsa
- Species: G. magma

Binomial name
- Gloeocapsa magma (Brébisson) Kützing, 1847

= Gloeocapsa magma =

Species of bacterium

Gloeocapsa magma is a species of bacteria in the Gloeocapsa genus of cyanobacteria, an ancient line of photosynthesizing bacteria, which photolyze water generating oxygen gas.

== Impact on human habitation ==
Gloeocapsa magma gained notoriety in the Southeastern United States in the 1990s, but it has since spread throughout most of the rest of the United States and Canada. This particular type of cyanobacteria is responsible for creating black stains and streaks on roofs. The bacteria accumulate over time as it feeds on moisture and calcium carbonate. This accumulation begins to show the black stains as the cyanobacteria develop their dark and hard UV-protective outer coating.

The main reasons for the rapid spread and noticeability of these cyanobacteria are thought to be:

1. Rising humidity and temperatures combined with more and more bacteria spores promotes their spread with these favorable conditions.
2. Fiberglass shingles are made with limestone as a filler (in the asphalt). These shingles hold moisture and organic "bacteria food" material longer (especially on the North-side in the Midwest of the USA) than the paper/asphalt/ceramic shingles of the 1980s. The bacteria are airborne. This cyanobacteria causes substantial destruction to roofs causing shingle decay and loss of reflective power. Over time, Gloeocapsa magma breaks down the shingles by feeding off of the limestone granules embedded in the shingles. This decreases a roof's ability to reflect ultra-violet rays of light and shortens the life of the roof.

Once the bacteria have become noticeable, the stains will continue to worsen year to year. As the bacterial colony grows, gravity pulls it downward, resulting in the smear-like stain down roofs. Most experts within the subject area conclude the bacteria to be harmful, if left untreated, as the growth holds moisture within shingles causing premature aging, rotting, and/or granule loss.

The buildup of Gloeocaspa magma on residential properties has led to earlier roof replacements, lowered property resale values, insurance companies canceling policies and increased utility costs as the black stained roofing draws in more heat.

Treatment

There are many available options for the eradication of Gloeocapsa magma, the most common and most widely accepted solution being an application of sodium hypochlorite as well as copper sulfate. The preferred technique is a non-pressure application of a properly proportioned detergent mix, as this will avoid costly damage to the shingles. Many roof cleaning contractors offer this method of cleaning.The above method is used mainly in the USA, in the United Kingdom strict HSE regulations are followed and a licensed Biocide is used rather than Sodium Hypochlorite.
