= Gloeocapsopsis =

Scientific classification
- Domain: Bacteria
- Phylum: Cyanobacteria
- Class: Cyanophyceae
- Order: Chroococcales
- Family: Chroococcaceae
- Genus: Gloeocapsopsis; Geitler ex Komárek

Genus of cyanobacteria

Gloeocapsopsis is a genus of cyanobacteria belonging to the family Chroococcaceae.

The genus was first described by Geitler ex J. Komárek in 1993.

The genus has cosmopolitan distribution.

Species:

- Gloeocapsopsis crepidinum
- Gloeocapsopsis magma
