= Franciscus (disambiguation) =

Franciscus is a male given name.

Franciscus may also refer to:

- James Franciscus (1934 – 1991), an American actor
- Pope Franciscus (1936 – 2025), head of the Catholic Church and sovereign of the Vatican City State from 2013 until his death in 2025
- Magister Franciscus (fl. 1370–80), French composer-poet in the ars nova style of late medieval music

== See also ==
- Franciscus Junius
