= Limnococcus =

Scientific classification
- Domain: Bacteria
- Phylum: Cyanobacteria
- Class: Cyanophyceae
- Order: Chroococcales
- Family: Chroococcaceae
- Genus: Limnococcus (Komárek & Anagnostidis) Komárková, Jezberová, O.Komárek & Zapomelová, 2010

Genus of bacteria

Limnococcus is a genus of cyanobacteria belonging to the family Chroococcaceae.

The genus has almost cosmopolitan distribution.

Species:

- Limnococcus limneticus (Lemmerm.) J.Komárková et al.
