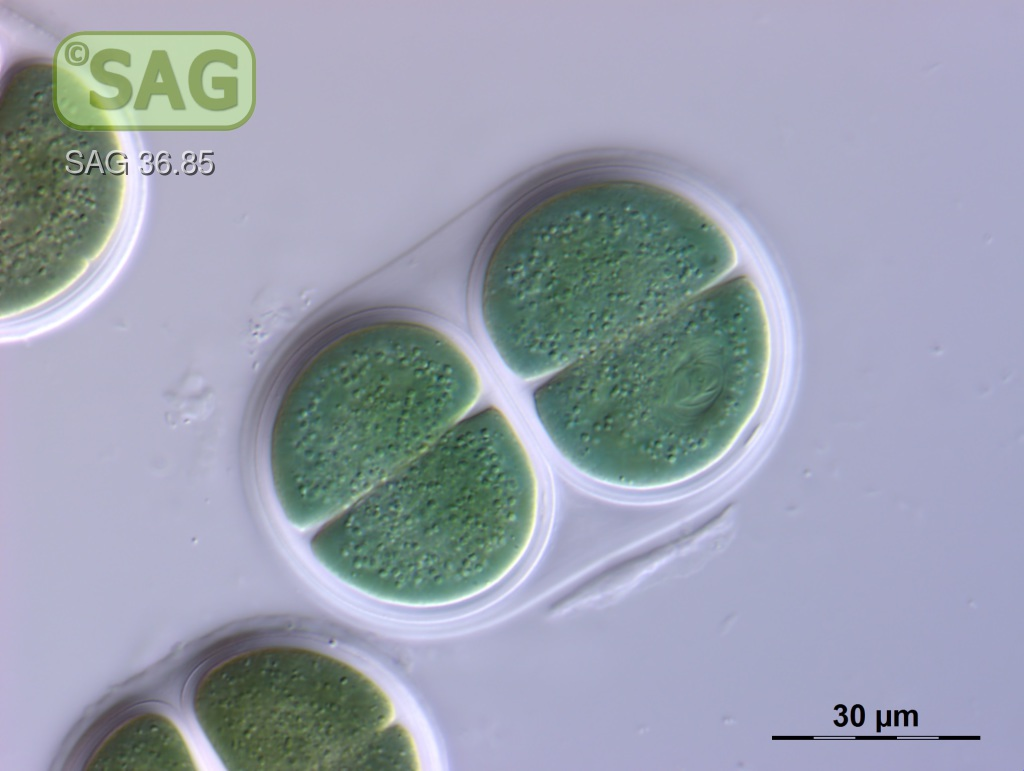
- Chroococcus turgidus

Scientific classification
- Domain: Bacteria
- Phylum: Cyanobacteria
- Class: Cyanophyceae
- Order: Chroococcales
- Family: Chroococcaceae
- Genus: Chroococcus; Nägeli, 1849

= Chroococcus =

Genus of bacteria

Chroococcus is a genus of cyanobacteria belonging to the family Chroococcaceae.

As a result of recent genetic analyses, several new genera were erected from this genus: e.g., Limnococcus.

The genus has a cosmopolitan distribution.

Species:

- Chroococcus batavus Joosten
- Chroococcus cimneticus Ong
- Chroococcus cohaerens (Bréb.) Nägeli
- Chroococcus dispersus (Keissl.) Lemmermann
- Chroococcus hansgirgi Schmidle
- Chroococcus minor (Kütz.) Nägeli
- Chroococcus minutus (Kütz.) Nägeli
- Chroococcus turgidus (Kütz.) Nägeli
- Chroococcus yellowstonensis J.J.Copeland
