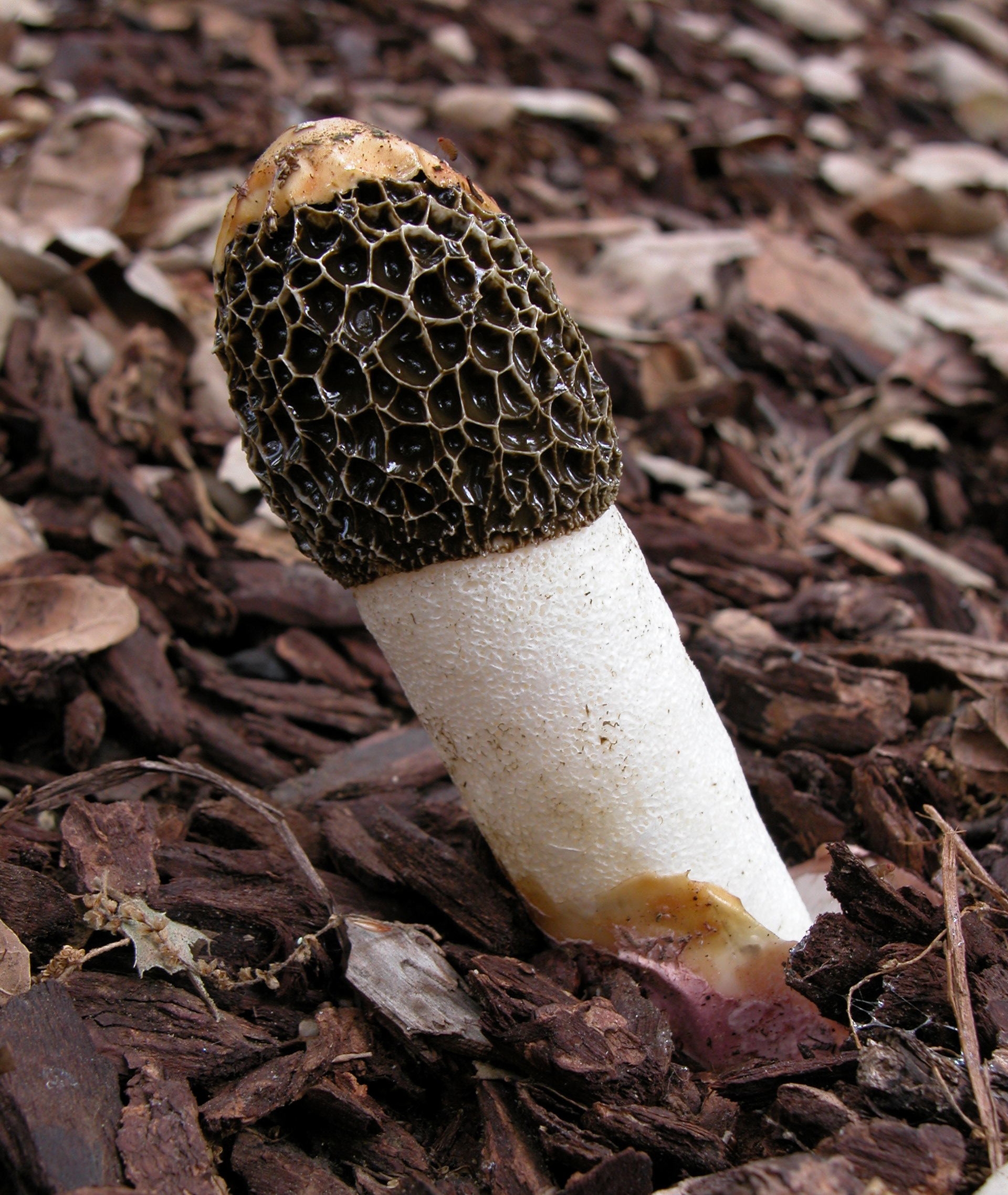

Scientific classification
- Kingdom: Fungi
- Division: Basidiomycota
- Class: Agaricomycetes
- Order: Phallales
- Family: Phallaceae
- Genus: Phallus
- Species: P. hadriani

Binomial name
- Phallus hadriani Vent.

Synonyms
- 1817 Hymenophallus hadriani (Vent.) Nees; 1836 Phallus iosmus Berk. 1873 Phallus imperialis Schulzer; Ithyphallus impudicus var. imperialis (Schulzer) De Toni; Ithyphallus impudicus var. iosmos (Berk.) De Toni

= Phallus hadriani =

Dune stinkhorn or sand stinkhorn fungus

Phallus hadriani
- Mycological characteristics
- Glebal hymenium
- Cap is conical
- Spore print is olive
- Ecology is saprotrophic
- Edibility is edible but not recommended

Phallus hadriani, commonly known as the dune stinkhorn, Hadrian's stinkhorn or the sand stinkhorn, is a species of fungus in the Phallaceae (stinkhorn) family. The stalk of the fruit body reaches up to 20 cm (8 in) tall by 4 cm (1 1/2 in) thick, and is spongy, fragile, and hollow. At the top of the stem is a ridged and pitted, thimble-like cap over which is spread olive-colored spore slime (gleba). Shortly after emerging, the gleba liquefies and releases a fetid odor that attracts insects, which help disperse the spores. P. hadriani may be distinguished from the similar P. impudicus (the common stinkhorn) by the presence of a pink or violet-colored volva at the base of the stem, and by differences in odor.

It is a widely distributed species, and is native to Eurasia and North America. In Australia, it is probably an introduced species. It typically grows in public lawns, yards and gardens, usually in sandy soils. It is said to be edible in its immature egg-like stage.

== Taxonomy ==
The species was first described scientifically by the French botanist Étienne Pierre Ventenat in 1798, and sanctioned by Christiaan Hendrik Persoon under that name in his 1801 Synopsis Methodica Fungorum. Christian Gottfried Daniel Nees von Esenbeck called the species Hymenophallus hadriani in 1817; this name is a synonym. According to the taxonomical database Index Fungorum, additional synonyms include: Phallus iosmus, named by Berkeley in 1836; Phallus imperialis, Schulzer, 1873; Ithyphallus impudicus var. imperialis and Ithyphallus impudicus var. iosmos, De Toni, date unknown.

The specific epithet hadriani is named after the Dutch botanist Hadrianus Junius (1512–1575), who wrote a pamphlet on stinkhorn mushrooms in 1564 (Phalli, ex fungorum genere, in Hollandiae sabuletis passim crescentis descriptio).

== Description ==
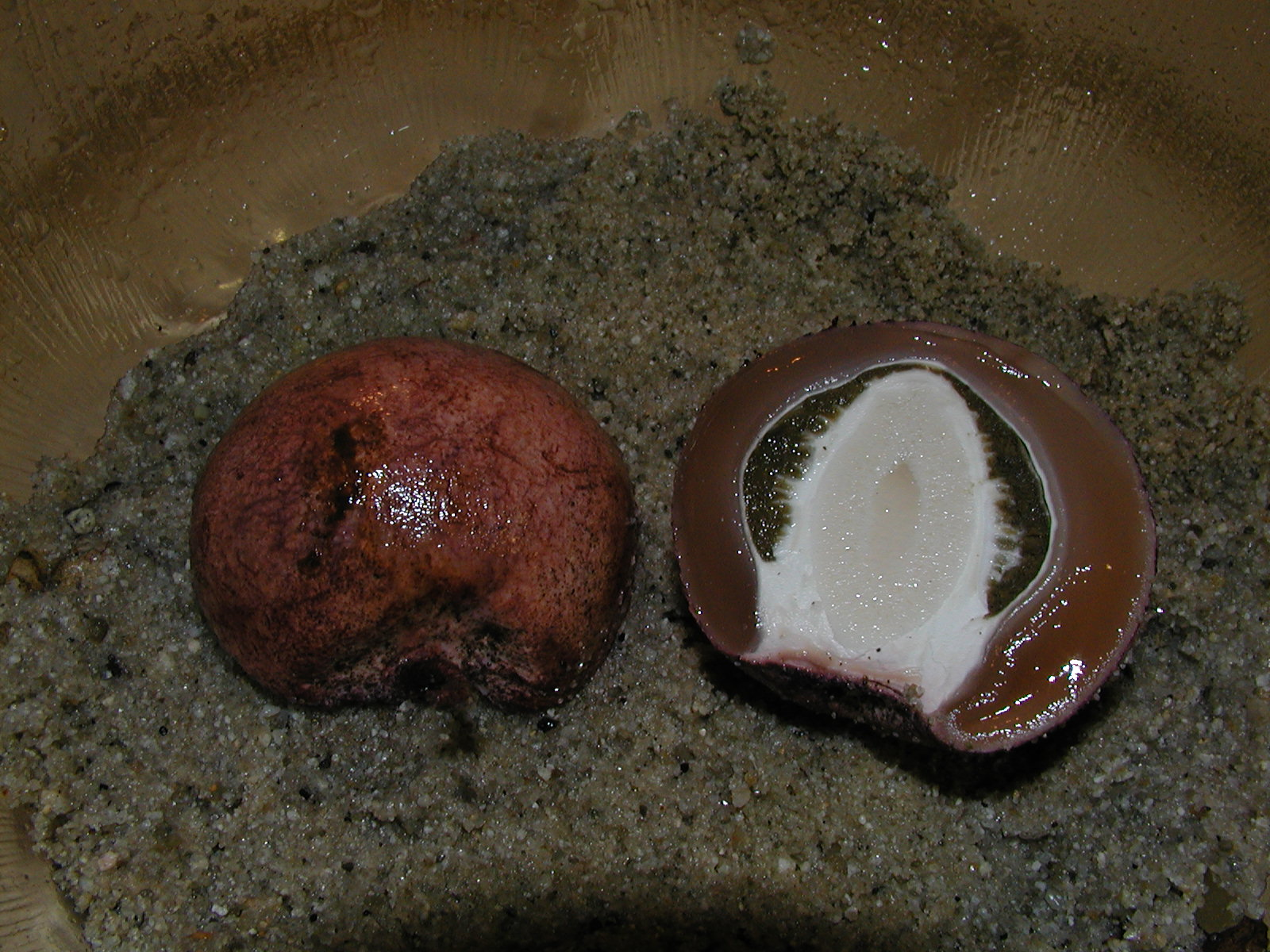
A cross-section of the immature egg-form

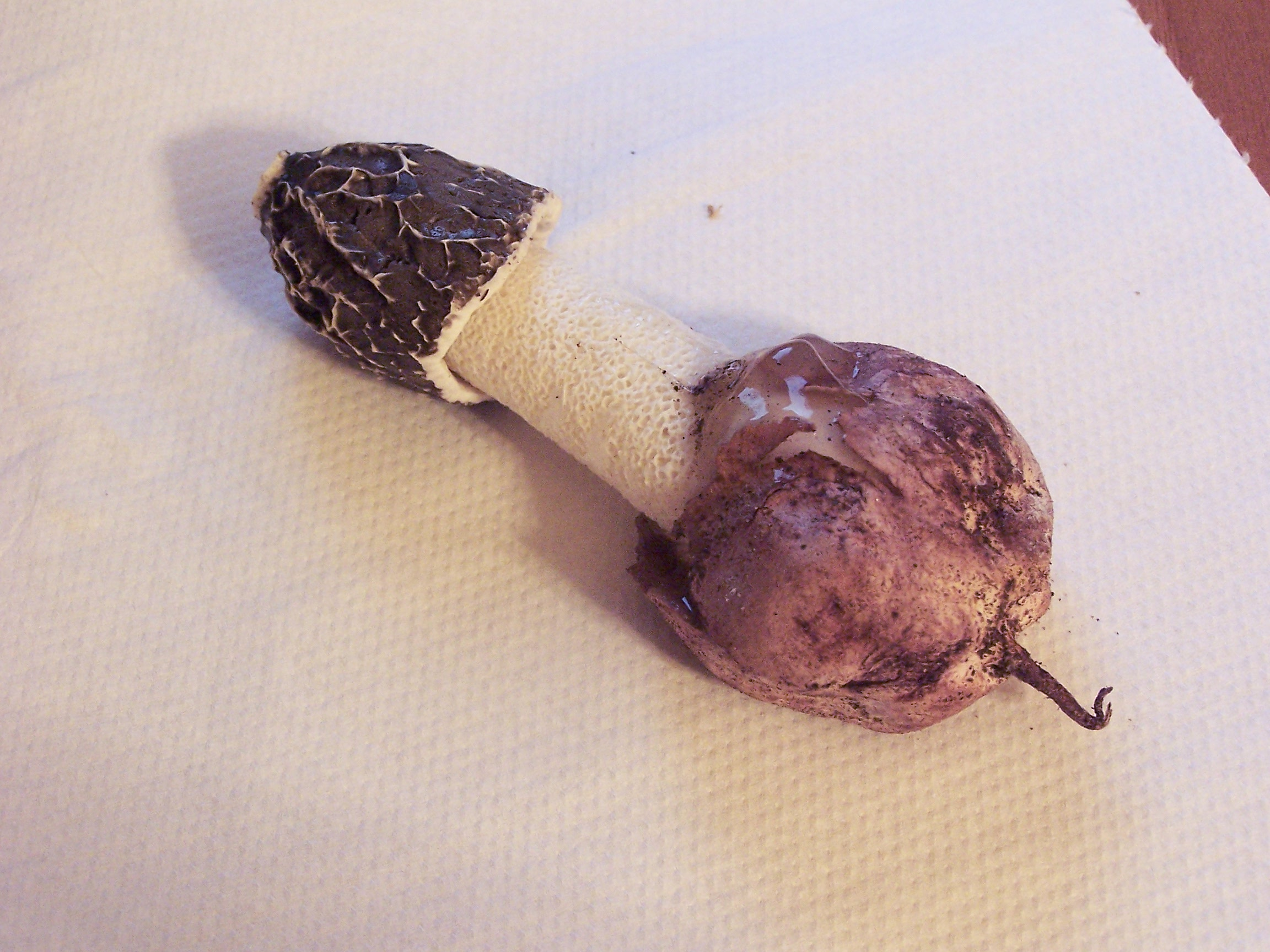
The pink volva is what remains of the tough outer covering of the immature egg.

The immature fruiting bodies of P. hadriani in the egg stage have dimensions of 4 to 6 cm (1 1/2 to 2 1/4 in) by 3 to 4 cm (1 1/4 to 1 1/2 in), and are colored rosy-pink to violet. They are typically submerged in the ground with rhizomorphs (aggregations of mycelium resembling plant roots) at the base. The eggs are enclosed in a tough covering and a gelatinous layer that breaks down as the stinkhorn emerges. Mature fruiting bodies may be 10 to 20 cm (4 to 8 in) tall by 3 to 4 cm (1 1/4 to 1 1/2 in) thick. The white- or cream-colored stipe is up to 3 cm wide, hollow, spongy and honeycombed. The head is reticulate, ridged and pitted, and covered with olive green glebal mass. The volva is cuplike, and typically retains its pink color although it may turn brownish with age. Fruit bodies are short-lived, typically lasting only one or two days.

Although the odor of P. hadriani has been described by some authors as faint and pleasant or like violets, others describe the smell as fetid or putrid. The gleba is known to attract insects, including flies, bees, and beetles, some of which consume the spore-containing slime. It is thought that long-distance spore dispersal is facilitated by these insects, who may deposit in their feces intact spores that survive the passage through the digestive tract.

The spores are cylindrical, smooth, and hyaline (translucent), with dimensions of 3–4 by 1–2 μm. The basidia (spore-bearing cells) are cylindrical, with dimensions of 20–25 by 3–4 μm. They have eight sterigmata (slender extensions that attach to the spores), as well as a clamp at their base.

=== Similar species ===
Phallus impudicus has the same overall appearance as P. hadriani, but is distinguished by its white volva. Another similar stinkhorn, P. ravenelii has a smooth, not reticulate head.

== Habitat and distribution ==
Phallus hadriani is known to be in Australia (where it is thought to be an introduced species imported on woodchip mulch used in gardening and landscaping), North America, Europe (including Denmark, Ireland, Latvia, The Netherlands, Norway, Poland, Slovakia, Sweden, Ukraine, and Wales) Turkey (Iğdır Province), Japan, and China (Jilin Province).

Phallus hadriani is a saprobic species, and thus obtains nutrients by decomposing organic matter. In North America, it is commonly associated with tree stumps, or roots of stumps that are decomposing in the ground. In Great Britain, its distribution is more or less restricted to coastal dunes, while in Poland, it has been noted to avoid humid and humic forest soils, and live in symbiosis with xerophilous grasses and the black locust tree, Robinia pseudoacacia. The mushroom is one of three species protected by the Red Data Book of Latvia.

== Edibility ==
Like many other stinkhorns, this species is thought to be edible when in its egg form. Central Europeans and the Chinese consider the eggs a delicacy. Regarding the edibility of mature specimens, one author commented on the genus in general, "No one with his sense of smell developed would think of eating the members of this group."
