= Gloeocapsin =

Gloeocapsin is an extracellular pigment of some cyanobacteria, believed to provide UV-protection to the cell. It is especially abundant in cyanobacterial species that inhabit places exposed to high levels of sunlight, such as the surface of rocks. In natural samples, the identification of gloeocapsin is based on its property to change color with varying pH, ranging from purple in alkaline media to red in acidic media. It is named after the cyanobacterial genus Gloeocapsa where it was first identified. Its chemical structure is yet to be identified.
