= Atla palicei =

Scientific classification
- Kingdom: Fungi
- Division: Ascomycota
- Class: Eurotiomycetes
- Order: Verrucariales
- Family: Verrucariaceae
- Genus: Atla
- Species: A. palicei

Binomial name
- Atla palicei Savić & Tibell (2008)
- Holotype: Låktatjåkka, Sweden

Species of lichen

Atla palicei is a species of saxicolous (rock-dwelling), crustose lichen in the family Verrucariaceae. It forms a thin, blackish-brown to black growth with a scurfy appearance and a diffusely areolate pattern on its substrate. The lichen contains a complex mixture of photobionts, including an unidentified green alga and cyanobacteria from the genera Nostoc and Chroococcus. It is characterised by small hemispherical perithecia (averaging 0.46 mm in diameter) that emerge from small areolae, with each perithecium surrounded by a cuff-like structure. The species was formally described in 2008 based on specimens collected in Sweden, and has been tentatively reported from Finland, though with some molecular and morphological differences. It is found growing on calcareous rocks near streams at elevations between 410 and 650 metres.

== Taxonomy ==
The lichen was formally described as a new species in 2008 by Sanja Savić and Leif Tibell. The type specimen was collected in the Kärkevagge valley (Låktatjåkka, Kiruna Municipality), where it was found near a stream growing on a west-facing calcareous boulder. It is only known to occur in the Torne Lappmark in Sweden at elevations between 410 and 650 m (1,350 and 2,130 ft), but the authors suggest that it is "probably overlooked elsewhere". The type specimen was collected by the Czech lichenologist Zdeněk Palice, for whom the species is named.

In 2016, Juha Pykälä and Leena Myllys reported a specimen from Finland that was initially identified as A. palicei based on morphological features. However, molecular analysis showed that the internal transcribed spacer (ITS) DNA sequence of this specimen differed from the type specimen by about 3%, which is at the threshold typically used for distinguishing fungal species. The Finnish specimen also had slight morphological differences, including a thinner involucrellum (70–90 μm thick compared to 90–110 μm in the type specimen) and a less developed, non-areolate thallus. Despite these differences, the authors provisionally maintained this specimen within A. palicei, noting that additional material would be needed to determine whether it represents a distinct but closely related species.

== Description ==
Atla palicei forms a thin, superficial growth that appears scurfy (flaky or scaly) with a blackish-brown to black colouration. The thallus (the main body of the lichen) grows in a diffusely areolate pattern, meaning it forms small, often disconnected patches or island-like structures on its substrate. The photobiont composition (the photosynthetic partner in the lichen symbiosis) is complex and not fully understood. Samples of the type specimen contain a mixture of an unidentified green alga along with cyanobacteria from the genera Nostoc and Chroococcus. However, researchers have not yet determined which of these potential photobionts actually forms the symbiotic relationship with the fungal component of A. palicei.

The reproductive structures, called perithecia, are relatively small (averaging 0.46 mm in diameter) and hemispherical in shape. These structures emerge from small areolae that surround the perithecium like a cuff, with only the base of the perithecium immersed in the thallus. The perithecia lack a thalline cover (a layer of thallus tissue).

The internal anatomy of A. palicei includes a well-developed involucrellum (a protective outer layer) that is about 90–110 μm thick and dark brown when viewed in cross-section. This structure is strongly carbonized (darkened and hardened) in its outer portion and fused with the excipulum (the outer wall of the fruiting body). The central part of the involucrellum consists of a pseudoparenchyma (tissue-like structure) comprising rounded to slightly elongated cells.

The excipulum itself has a greenish-brown colour and is made up of narrow hyphae (fungal filaments) arranged in a concentric pattern. The hamathecium (the sterile tissue within the fruiting body) lacks hyphal elements except for pseudoparaphyses (sterile filaments) that form below the ostiolum(opening). These pseudoparaphyses are very slender, numerous, and measure 75–110 μm in length.

The mature asci (spore-producing structures) lack apical thickening, measure 139–146 by 40–44 μm, and have an ellipsoidal to club-shaped form. Each ascus contains eight spores. The ascospores are ellipsoidal and hyaline (colourless and transparent) when mature, with a muriform structure (divided by both transverse and longitudinal walls). They typically have 12–15 transverse walls that reach the periphery along one side of the spores when viewed in a median optical section, and 4–5 longitudinal walls in the central part. The ascospores measure about 23–26 μm in length (averaging 24.4 μm).

== Habitat and distribution ==
Atla palicei is known to occur only in Torne Lappmark in Sweden, where it is found growing on calcareous rocks near streams, and has been tentatively reported from Finland, though the Finnish specimen shows some molecular and morphological differences that may warrant further taxonomic investigation.
