= Atla oulankaensis =

Scientific classification
- Kingdom: Fungi
- Division: Ascomycota
- Class: Eurotiomycetes
- Order: Verrucariales
- Family: Verrucariaceae
- Genus: Atla
- Species: A. oulankaensis

Binomial name
- Atla oulankaensis Pykälä & Myllys (2016)

Species of lichen

Atla oulankaensis is a rare species of saxicolous (rock-dwelling) lichen in the family Verrucariaceae. It has been recorded in Finland and in the Canadian arctic, growing on calciferous rock and on high-pH soil.

== Taxonomy ==
The lichen was formally described as a new species in 2016 by Juha Pykälä and Leena Myllys. The type specimen was collected by the first author from the Jäkälävuoma gorge in Oulanka National Park (Juuma, Koillismaa) at an altitude of 208 m (682 ft); there it was found growing on a shady dolomitic rock outcrop on a northwest-facing wall. The species epithet oulankaensis refers to the type locality, which is, according to the authors, "one of the lichenologically most valuable areas in Finland". It has also been collected from Banks Island in the Canadian Arctic Archipelago, where it was growing on high-pH soil.

Molecular analysis of the internal transcribed spacer DNA regions suggests that Atla alaskana is the closest relative of A. oulankaensis, although they are readily distinguished by differences in morphology and ecology.

== Description ==
Atla tibelliorum has a thin grey to greenish-grey body (thallus) measuring about 10–50 μm in thickness. The thallus forms a continuous layer and is frequently covered by blue-green algae (cyanobacteria) of the genus Nostoc, some of which form specialised structures called cephalodia or cephalodia-like formations. The Nostoc cells measure 5–7 μm in diameter. The primary photosynthetic partner (photobiont) is a green alga with cells measuring 5–8 μm.

The reproductive structures (perithecia) measure 0.30–0.38 mm in diameter and are partially immersed in the thallus (about one-quarter of their height). Young perithecia are thinly covered by a layer of thallus material (about 8–15 μm thick) except at their apex, while older perithecia lose this covering. These structures appear in densities of approximately 50–80 per square cm on the thallus surface.

The opening of the perithecium (ostiole) ranges from pale to dark in colour, is depressed below the surface, and measures 30–100 μm in width. The protective outer layer (involucrellum) extends to the base level of the inner wall (exciple) or curves underneath it, sometimes completely enveloping the exciple. This outer layer measures 38–76 μm in thickness and is pressed against the exciple. The exciple itself measures 0.25–0.37 mm in diameter with a wall that ranges from medium to dark brown and is roughly 30–35 μm thick. Inside the perithecia are slender, branching structures called periphysoids that measure approximately 30–63 by 1–2 μm. The spore-containing sacs (asci) measure about 147–177 by 63–72 μm and each contains eight spores.

The spores (ascospores) are dark brown, though a few mature or overmature spores may be pale. They have a complex internal structure divided into multiple compartments (muriform), typically measuring 51–60–69 by 23–25–28 μm. In cross-section, they usually show 12–16 transverse walls (trans-septa) reaching the edge along one side, and 4–6 longitudinal walls (longisepta) in the central part. The spores are often curved or bent, and older spores frequently break into two pieces.
