= Hadrianus Junius =

Dutch academic and writer (1511–1575)

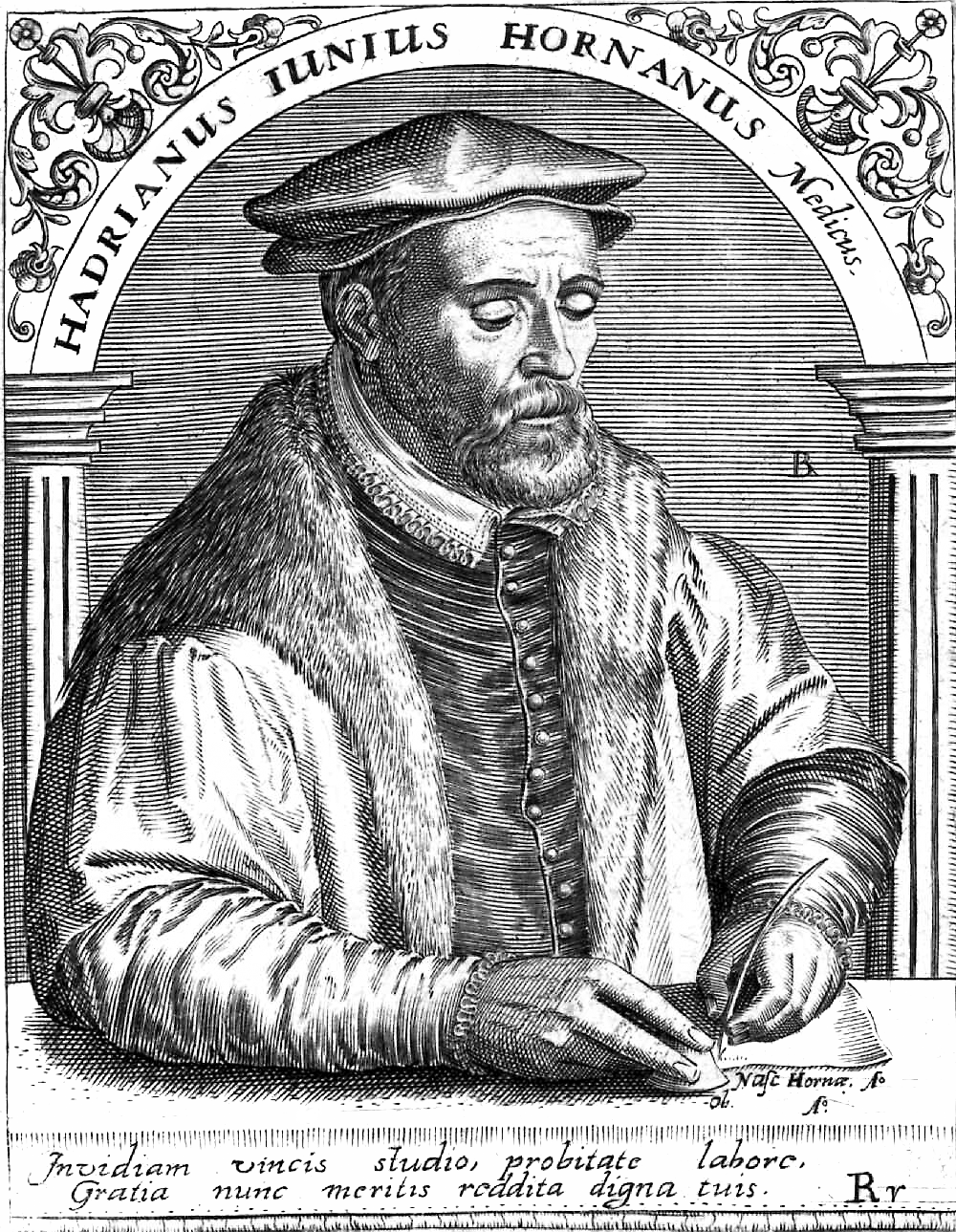
- Hadrianus Junius, by Theodor de Bry
- Born: 1511
- Died: 1575 (aged 63–64)
- Other name: Adriaen de Jonghe
- Occupations: Physician, classical scholar, translator, lexicographer, antiquarian, historiographer, emblematist, school rector, and Latin poet

Hadrianus Junius (1511–1575), also known as Adriaen de Jonghe, was a Dutch physician, classical scholar, translator, lexicographer, antiquarian, historiographer, emblematist, school rector, and Latin poet.

He is not to be confused with several namesakes (including a seventeenth-century Amsterdam school rector). He was not related to Franciscus Junius.

== Biography ==
=== Life ===
==== Youth and education ====
Adriaen de Jonge or Hadrianus Junius, was born in the West Frisian town of Hoorn on 1 July 1511, from a family of local regents. He attended the Latin School in Haarlem. At the relatively advanced age of 23, he went to study in Louvain, where he spent a couple of years. He then embarked on his peregrinatio academica, which led him through Siena, Bologna, Venice and Rome.

In his letters, he reports on his visits to the famous legal humanist Andrea Alciato, his attendance at an interrupted Greek-orthodox liturgical service in Venice, and on an experiment with glow-worms in the Bolognese countryside. He obtained his doctoral degree in philosophy and medicine in Bologna in 1540. Not long after his graduation, Junius left for Paris, a centre of printing. There he acted as an agent for the printer Christian Wechel, who published his first work: an edition with Latin translation of Cassius Iatrosophista (1541). In Paris Junius seems to have met Edmund Bonner, bishop of London, with whom he visited Ghent.

==== England ====
In April 1544 he headed for London, where Thomas Howard, third duke of Norfolk, made him his physician. Howard's son Henry, the 'poet earl of Surrey' (who was naturally interested in literary men like Junius) enlisted him as a tutor to his children. Junius spent much of his time in Norfolk, at the family's castle in Kenninghall. He divided his time between private instruction to the children (about whom he complained) and on various scholarly projects: an edition of Curtius Rufus' biography of Alexander the Great (published 1546), an edition with translation of part of Plutarch's Moral essays (published 1547) and a Greek-Latin Lexicon (1548).

The alliance with the Howards came to an abrupt end when Thomas and Henry Howard were imprisoned on allegations of high treason. Junius lost a large part of his library when his patron's belongings were confiscated. Even before Henry Howard was executed by Henry VIII, on 19 January 1547, Junius successfully solicited the patronage of Charles V's envoy Franciscus van der Dilft (or Dilfius), to whom he dedicated his edition of Plutarch. He dedicated his Lexicon to the new king: the very young Protestant Edward VI. Apparently, Junius tried to secure a position at the English court; in 1550 he dedicated the manuscript of his work on calendars to Edward. Meanwhile, he also praised Charles V in his edition of Curtius and perhaps he tried his luck, through Van der Dilft, at the Habsburg court as well, since he did not feel entirely comfortable witnessing the conversion of the English Church to Protestantism. In his letters, he describes the stripping of the altars as a result of the Edwardian injunctions

==== Haarlem ====
In 1550 Junius left for Holland to marry and take up a post as rector of the Latin School in Haarlem. The job was not to his liking, and after two years he exchanged it for a post as city physician. Meanwhile, he had not given up on the English and the Habsburg courts, for he dedicated the published version of his book on calendars to Edward VI (1553) and the revised edition to his successor, the Catholic Mary Tudor (1556).

In the meantime he had travelled to London to present his epic poem Philippeis to Mary on the occasion of her wedding to Philip of Spain in 1554. He dedicated his commentary on Horace's Odes to Gonsalvo Perez, and that on the third book of Vergil's Aeneid to Juan de Verzosa. Both of these dedicatees were loyal servants to the Spanish crowns and humanists in their own right. But the clean copies he prepared for the press were never printed and attempts to enter the inner circle around the Spanish throne through the intervention of, amongst others, bishop Stephen Gardiner and the future Cardinal Granvelle, faltered as well. All his dedications to mighty Protestants and Catholics alike had remained fruitless.

During the 1550s, Junius' works appeared with various printers in Basle. Despite a fire in his study in 1554, which cost him 'months, if not years of work', his hodge-podge collection of philological annotations on classical literature appeared in 1556: the Animadversa. He dedicated it to Granvelle and its pages repeatedly pay tribute to Granvelle's secretary, the antiquarian Antoine Morillon. To the Animadversa was appended a long treatise De coma commentarium (Commentary on hair), a paradoxical encomium, purportedly written in defiance of critique on the short Italian haircut which he had adopted in Italy.

The commentary was crushed under its own weight as a result of its endless strings of quotations and lack of humour, but it demonstrates his antiquarian interests and his ability to group together hundreds of fragments. In 1558 his edition of the Homeric commentator Eustathius appeared in Basle, prefaced by the anti-Catholic Laurence Humphrey. Junius himself would have preferred to see the work printed with a dedication to Joachim Hoppers, a man who soon was to rise at Philip II's court. The year 1558 also saw the publication of Junius' supplement of 850 proverbs to Erasmus' famous and much used Adagia. All these works show a preference for the juxtaposition of fragments from all sorts of sources.

Junius' first marriage had resulted in the birth of two children, Clara and Petrus. After the death of his wife he remarried, in 1555. His new wife was Adriana Hasselaer, sister of Kenau, who became legendary for her supposedly heroic role in defending Haarlem against the Spanish during the siege of 1573. Junius became well integrated into the cultural élite of the Haarlem, which included the philosopher Dirck Volkertsz Coornhert, the engraver Philips Galle, the painter Maarten van Heemskerck, and, later, the school rector and Latin playwright Cornelius Schonaeus. He also set up a private school in his own house, to teach the sons of the élite he knew so well and to secure himself a stable income in addition to the salary he gained from his post as a physician. We know very little of his medical practice: it seems to have been more of an honorary post, but he occasionally acted as advisor on medical politics in the city.

An expedition to Copenhagen in 1564, answering the call to become professor of medicine and royal physician, resulted in disillusion after just three months, due to lack of payment, bad weather and his unconfident speech (Junius stammered). In the years leading up to the Danish adventure, he had been preparing a number of works. In 1564 appeared a curious booklet with a description of a mushroom found in the dunes and shaped in the form of a penis: the fungus is still known as the Phallus hadriani today. After his return he focused with renewed energy on another project. Junius cashed in on his by now firmly established fame by striking a deal with Europe's leading printer Christopher Plantin, who published his religious poem Anastaurosis, his influential Emblemata and his edition of the lexicographer Nonius Marcellus. The Emblems show that the political situation of that time was not as clearcut as it would become in the years which followed. Some of the Emblems are dedicated to representatives of the Spanish crown (including Granvelle and some Dutch administrators), but Junius also managed to secure the support of William the Silent in his bid to be appointed as historiographer of the States of Holland and Westfrisia. Perhaps the dedication of his octolingual dictionary Nomenclator (printed 1567) to William's son Philip William had contributed to his success. Junius was charged with collecting historical evidence for the States' right to convene independently from central government in Brussels. Junius made plans to travel around Holland to do research for his history, but he worked on other projects as well: in 1568 he re-published his edition of Martial. The first edition, based on a manuscript he had obtained in England, had appeared in 1559 in Basel without his name being mentioned anywhere in the book, much to his annoyance. In 1568 he also travelled to London, to present his edition and Latin translation of Eunapius' Life of philosophers to Queen Elizabeth I. Much to his disappointment, she ignored the gesture and after failed attempts to further his cause via William Cecil, Lord Burghley, Junius returned home. But he first asked the Queen's direct permission to export sixty dickers of cow's skins, presumably destined for Christopher Plantin, who needed parchment to print a number of luxurious editions of his famous Antwerp polyglot bible. In 1570, Junius finished the first draft of his Batavia, printed only posthumously in 1588 (see below).

==== Final years ====
In the midst of the war, he kept on working on the draft of his Batavia, but also on an edition of the lexicographer Hesychius (1572). Not long after its appearance, Haarlem was besieged and Junius fled the city, settling temporarily in Delft in 1573. He lost part of his library when Haarlem fell in July 1573. In February 1574, on the recommendation of William the Silent, he was appointed city physician of Middelburg. Later that year, he briefly assisted his friend the physician Petrus Forestus, at the sick bed of William the Silent in Rotterdam. In the meantime, Junius' own health was declining. He had never had a very good constitution: his letters are rife with descriptions of his bad physical state and the measures he took to cure himself. In 1575, Junius was hastily appointed professor of medicine of the University of Leiden, which was inaugurated at the beginning of the year but which still needed to be properly set up. Junius never had the chance to start lecturing: he succumbed on 16 June 1575 in Arnemuiden, where he was buried. His remains were relocated to the Grote Kerk at Middelburg four years later. After 1816 his gravestone there disappeared, never to be found again.

=== Junius and Rome ===
In the first Index of Forbidden Books (1559) Junius' name appeared among authors of the first class, because of the dedication of his Greek-Latin dictionary (1548) to the Protestant Edward VI. Junius successfully lobbied for rehabilitation, partly with the help of his friend Benito Arias Montano. Nevertheless, indices purgatorii continued to instruct Catholic readers to remove dedications to Protestant princes in Junius' works and cross out passages which could be interpreted as critical of Catholicism. Yet, there is no sign that Junius ever converted to Protestantism. He is likely to have remained, like so many other intellectuals of the period, a tolerant Catholic.

=== Batavia ===
In 1570, Junius finished the first draft of his Batavia. By then, the political landscape had altered dramatically: 1566 saw a wave of iconoclasm (Junius reported on the smashing of statues in churches in Amsterdam), in 1567 the Duke of Alba arrived and William the Silent went into exile, and in 1568, Alba had the counts of Egmond and Horne beheaded in Brussels. The States of Holland now recoiled from publishing a work which openly defended the plea for more independence of Holland. Yet, there is very little politics in Junius' Batavia: it is more a loosely organised overview of all sorts of individual histories and antiquarian aspects of 'Batavia' (i.e. Holland, the territory roughly coinciding with the modern westernmost part of The Netherlands). The most famous story is no doubt the legend that the printing press was invented in Haarlem at the beginning of the 1540s by Laurens Janszoon Coster. An employee of Coster was supposed to have fled with the instruments and the know-how to Mainz.

The Batavia was eventually printed in 1588, long after the Dutch Revolt had developed into a full blown war following the Act of Abjuration in 1581, the murder on William in 1584, and the failed attempts, in 1585-87, to have Robert Dudley, Earl of Leicester, rule the rebellious provinces. In some copies of the Batavia kept in Spain, the few passages in which the Spaniards are criticized are censored, in accordance with seventeenth-century indices purgatorii (lists of books and passages in books which were deemed harmful to Catholic dogma).

=== Legacy ===
Junius was dubbed a 'second Erasmus' by some of his contemporaries, but his scope was much more limited. He devoted himself primarily to linguistic, lexicographical and philological work, and he often dipped into etymologies, antiquarian explanations and geographical detail. Even his most literary work, his Emblems, testify to his preference for short, self-contained entities above structural narratives and philosophical argument. His Batavia was scheduled to be followed by two volumes of historical narrative, starting from the first Counts of Holland and leading up to the Burgundian kings, but Junius never even embarked on this political history. Instead, he chose to polish up his 'logistorical' Batavia in the few years which left him. He was not the theologian Erasmus was, but he did share Erasmus' taste for pedagogy. He was above all a man of encyclopaedic learning. Nothing has remained of what was perhaps his largest project, an edition and translation of the Suda, on which he worked for at least two decades but which never saw the light. He pillaged this Byzantine encyclopaedia, as he ransacked other encyclopaedic works and dictionaries for his own works. A commonplace book, now kept in the Bodleian Library in Oxford, does not reflect the immense learning of this somewhat ill-fated scholar. Yet, Junius also carried out research away from his books, as is demonstrated by his mushroom-treatise, the glow-worm story and his enquiries from chariot drivers concerning the technical terms of their trade, for the benefit of his hugely successful Nomenclator. His learning was acknowledged by his contemporaries: his correspondence, of which 426 letters survive, show that he enjoyed unlocking the vast resources of his erudition. They also show his sometimes ill-fated, but often successful, attempts to gain the patronage of the high and mighty. His descendants managed to secure some of his literary and scholarly heritage: his son Petrus Junius collected his letters (which did not then see the light of day, but were handed on to later generations, to be published only in 1652), his grandson Albert Verlaen publish his religious poetry (1598), and several books from his estate are still to be found in Leiden University library and other libraries. Many of his poems, and his Batavia, were posthumously published by his friend Janus Dousa, who contributed to establishing Junius' reputation for future generations as 'the most learned man in Holland after Erasmus'. On 1 July 2011, his 500th anniversary is celebrated in his native town of Hoorn, an occasion at which three books, including a biography, a Dutch translation of his Batavia and a volume of scholarly articles will be published (see references below).

== Publications ==
=== Editions of authors ===
- Cassius Medicus, De animalibus medicae quaestiones, 1541.
- Curtius Rufus, De rebus gestis Alexandri Magni, 1546.
- Eunapius, De vitis philosophorum, 1568, 1596.
- Eustathius, Copiae cornu sive Oceanus enarrationum Homericarum, 1558.
- Hesychius, De his qui eruditionis fama claruere liber, 1572, 1572, c. 2.
- Martialis, Epigrammata, 1559 (unacknowledged), 1568, 1584.
- Hippocrates, Eenen brief aen Demagetum, 1573.
- Nonius Marcellus, De proprietate sermonum, 1565.
- Plautus, Observationes, 1566.
- Plutarchus, Symposiaca problemata, 1547.
- Seneca, Annotationes in ludum de morte Claudii, 1557

=== Posthumously published editions and/or commentaries ===
- Ausonius, Notae in Ausonii opera, 1588.
- Iuvenalis, Notae selectae ad Satyras, 1685.
- pseudo-Lucanus, Ad Calpurnium Pisonem poemation, 1576 (previously in Animadversa, 1556)
- Petronius, Observationes in Satyricon, 1615.

=== Original works ===
- De anno et mensibus commentarius, cui adjungitur Fastorum liber, (…) quo, quicquid peculiariter apud Graecos, Hebraeos, Romanos, aliasque exoticas nationes memorabile quolihet die actum fuerit et observatum, compendio commonstratur, autore Hadriano Junio. Item Calendarium in quo totius anni dies articulatim ad calculum vocati, atque idipsum latinis haud barbaris sententiis, cuilibet anni tempori congruis, Basel (Henricus Petri), 1553
- Philippeis, sive in Nuptias Divi Philippi Aug. Pii & Heroinae Mariae Aug. Felicis, Regum Angliae, Franciae, Neapolis, Hierosolymorum & Hiberni etc. Carmen Heroicum, Londen (T. Berthe), 1554.
- De anno et mensibus commentarius: item Fastorum liber. Praeterea Calendarium syllabicum in quo totius anni dies ad calculum sunt vocati. Antiquitatis item reliquiae, Fasti Caesariani, imperante August. Caes. in marmore incisi, et Calendarium quod Rusticum nominant. Postremo Isocratis ad Demonicum admonitoria, eodem authore interprete, Basel (Henricus Petri), 1556.
- Animadversorum libri sex, omnigenae lectionis thesaurus, in quibus infiniti pene autorum loci corriguntur et declarantur, nunc primum et nati et in lucem aediti. Ejusdem de coma commentarium, Basel (Isengrinus), 1556, 1708, 1708, c. 2.
- Adagiorum Centuriae viii. cum dimidia, per Hadrianum Iunium medicum conscriptae: opus nouum et nunc primum in lucem editum, Basel (H. Frobenium), 1558.
- Phalli ex fungorum genere in Hollandiae sabuletis passim crescentis descriptio, et ad vivum expressa pictura, Delft (H. Schinckelius), 1564. web edition (Indexed by Linnaeus in his Bibliotheca Botanica, p. 39)
- Emblemata ad D. Arnoldum Cobelium. Ejusdem aenigmatum libellus ad Arnoldum Rosenbergum, Antwerp (Christopher Plantin), 1565. web edition
- Anastaurosis sive passio Servatoris Nostri Iesu Christi, ab Hadriano Iunio medico conscripta. Ad Clariss[imum] V[irum] D. Viglium Zuicemum in suprema Curia Praesidem, Antwerp (Christopher Plantin), 1565.
- Nomenclator, omnium rerum propria nomina variis linguis explicata indicans, Hadriano Iunio medico auctore, Antwerp (Christopher Plantin), 1567, 1571, 1574, 1577, 1583, 1583, c. 2, 1588, 1591, 1592, 1596, 1614, 1620.
- Batavia. In qua praeter gentis et insulae antiquitatem, originem ... aliaque ad eam historiam pertinentia, declaratur quae fuerit vetus Batavia...quae item genuina inclytae Francorum natonis fuerit sedes, Leiden (Franciscus Raphelengius), 1588, 1588, c. 2, 1652
- Poematum liber primus, continens pia et moralia carmina, quorum indicem post encomiastica carmina reperies, iamprimum in lucem prolata ab authoris nepote, ed. Albert Verlaen, Leiden (Ludovicus Elzevirius), 1598.
- Epistolae, quibus accedit ejusdem vita et oratio de artium liberalium dignitate. Nunquam antea edita, Dordrecht (Vincentius Caimax), 1552 [=1652], 1552, c. 2. Perhaps edited by Andreas Colvius.
- Epistolae selectae nunc primum editae, ed. Petrus Scheltema, Amsterdam (M.H. Schonekat), 1839.
