= R. gardneri =

R. gardneri may refer to:

- Radaisia gardneri, a cyanobacteria species in the genus Radaisia
- Rhipidomys gardneri, the Gardner's climbing mouse, a rodent species from South America
- Rhizanthella gardneri, the Western underground orchid, a plant species found in Western Australia

== See also ==
- Gardneri
