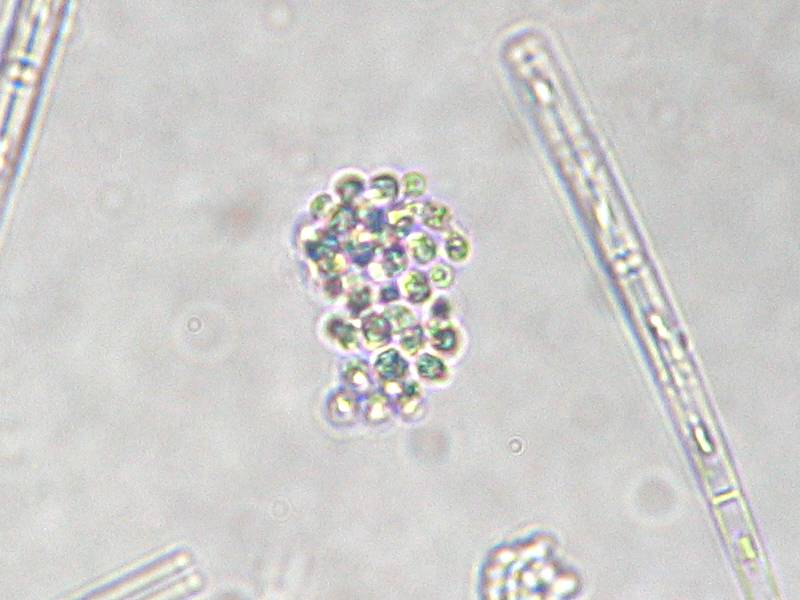
- Gonphosphaeria sp.

Scientific classification
- Domain: Bacteria
- Phylum: Cyanobacteria
- Class: Cyanophyceae
- Order: Chroococcales
- Family: Gomphosphaeriaceae
- Genus: Gomphosphaeria; Kützing

= Gomphosphaeria =

Genus of cyanobacteria

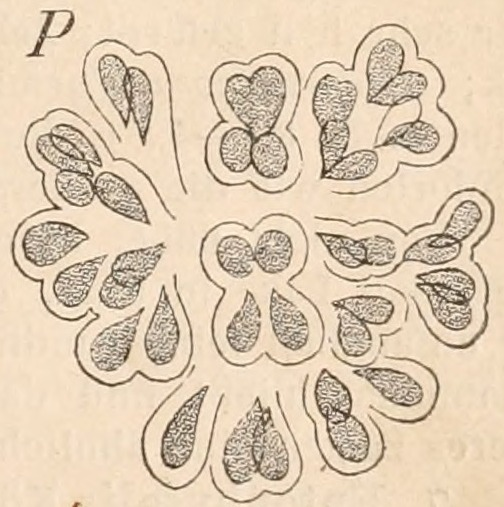
Gomphosphaeria aponina Kütz., illustration of a colony pressed apart

Gomphosphaeria (sometimes written Gonphosphaeria) is a genus of cyanobacteria belonging to the family Gomphosphaeriaceae.

The genus was first described by Friedrich Traugott Kützing in 1836.

The genus has cosmopolitan distribution.

Species:

- Gomphosphaeria aponina
- Gomphosphaeria salina
- Gomphosphaeria virieuxii
