= Atla wheldonii =

Scientific classification
- Domain: Eukaryota
- Kingdom: Fungi
- Division: Ascomycota
- Class: Eurotiomycetes
- Order: Verrucariales
- Family: Verrucariaceae
- Genus: Atla
- Species: A. wheldonii

Binomial name
- Atla wheldonii (Travis) Savić & Tibell (2008)

Synonyms
- Polyblastia wheldonii Travis (1947)

Species of lichen

Atla wheldonii is a species of terricolous (ground-dwelling), crustose lichen in the family Verrucariaceae. Found in Europe, it was formally described as a new species in 1947 by William Gladstone Travis from specimens collected from sand dunes in Lancashire, England, in 1924. Sanja Savić and Leif Tibell transferred the taxon to genus Atla in 2008 following molecular phylogenetic analysis that showed that it, along with three other Northern European species, comprised a distinct clade in the Verrucariacae.

In additional to the British Isles, Atla wheldonii has also been recorded in the Pyrenees, Austria, and Scandinavia. It grows on basic soil, usually alongside mosses and cyanobacteria; typical lichen associates include Thelocarpon impressellum and Solorina spongiosa, and sometimes Polyblastia helvetica. Atla wheldonii has a thin and poorly developed thallus, and ascomata in the forms or perithecia that are immersed in the thallus.

== Description ==
Atla wheldonii is a crustose lichen characterised by its thin, slightly glossy thallus (main body) that appears minutely bumpy (verrucose) and dark green in colour. The thallus becomes gelatinous when wet and is often only noticeable close to the fruiting bodies. While the primary photobiont (photosynthetic partner) is a green alga, colonies of cyanobacteria frequently occur in close association with both the thallus and perithecia (flask-shaped fruiting structures).

The perithecia of A. wheldonii are relatively small, averaging 0.39 mm in diameter, and are typically spherical or have a slightly extended opening (ostiolum). These reproductive structures are almost fully immersed within the thallus, though occasionally up to one-third may be exposed with a thalline covering around the base. The protective outer layer (excipulum) is brown, 35–60 μm thick, consisting of narrow concentrically arranged cells that become paler towards the interior. The hamathecium (sterile tissue within the fruiting body) lacks hyphal elements except for slender, branching pseudoparaphyses formed below the opening, measuring 75–95 μm long and 1.0–1.5 μm wide.

The spore-producing sacs (asci) of A. wheldonii lack apical thickening when mature and exhibit considerable size variation, measuring 159–306 by 69–87 μm, with shapes ranging from broadly to narrowly ellipsoidal or club-shaped. While typically containing eight spores, the number sometimes reduces to six or four, with these fewer spores being larger than in eight-spored asci. The mature spores quickly become dark brown and strongly muriform (divided by both transverse and longitudinal walls), measuring 70.1–87.2 by 33.3–45.2 μm. In cross-section, they display 10–15 transverse walls reaching the periphery along one side, with 4–5 longitudinal walls in the central part.
