= Atla tibelliorum =

Scientific classification
- Kingdom: Fungi
- Division: Ascomycota
- Class: Eurotiomycetes
- Order: Verrucariales
- Family: Verrucariaceae
- Genus: Atla
- Species: A. tibelliorum

Binomial name
- Atla tibelliorum Pykälä & Myllys (2016)

Species of lichen

Atla tibelliorum is a rare species of saxicolous (rock-dwelling) in the family Verrucariaceae. First scientifically described in 2016, this crustose lichen is characterised by its pale ochre-coloured body that forms cracked patterns on its substrate, with distinctive reproductive structures embedded within warty protrusions. The species has a highly specialised habitat, occurring only in specific alpine and arctic environments with calcareous conditions, and has been documented in northwestern Finland and Alaska. This uncommon lichen represents one of several rare species found in Finland's largest expanse of calcareous rock, the Toskalharji area.

== Taxonomy ==
The lichen was formally described as a new species in 2016 by Juha Pykälä and Leena Myllys. The type specimen was collected by the first author near Toskaljärvi lake (Porojärvi, Enontekiö); there, in a calcareous alpine grassland at an altitude of 730 m (2,400 ft), the lichen was found growing on dolomite pebbles. The species epithet tibelliorum honours "Sanja and Leif Tibell, the mother and father of the genus Atla".

== Description ==
Atla tibelliorum is a crustose lichen species characterised by its pale ochre-colored thallus (main body) that forms a pattern of cracks and small islands on its substrate. The thallus measures 200–280 micrometres (μm) in thickness, with individual areoles (island-like segments) ranging from 0.4 to 1.0 mm in width. The lichen contains a layer of algal cells measuring 6–11 μm in diameter, which participate in the symbiotic relationship essential to all lichens. The outer protective layer (cortex) measures approximately 5–25 μm thick, topped by a thin non-living layer (epinecral layer) of 8–13 μm. Occasionally, the thallus features specialised structures called cephalodia that contain blue-green algae of the genus Nostoc, which can fix nitrogen.

The reproductive structures (perithecia) are embedded within warty protrusions of the thallus, with only a small portion exposed around the opening (ostiole). The exposed part measures 0.10–0.15 mm in width, while the thallus covering the perithecia is approximately 50–150 μm thick. These perithecia occur at a density of about 30 per square centimetre. The openings (ostioles) are inconspicuous, tiny, dark, and slightly depressed, measuring about 30–60 μm across.

The inner structure includes an involucrellum (outer protective layer of the perithecium) that extends to the base of the exciple (inner wall), measuring 50–70 μm in thickness but sometimes thickening toward the base to 60–110 μm. The exciple itself measures 0.25–0.48 mm in diameter with a dark brown wall. Inside, periphysoids (sterile filaments) measure about 55–93 by 1.0–1.5 μm and exhibit branching. The spore-producing sacs (asci) measure about 147–177 by 63–72 μm and contain 8 spores each. The dark brown spores have multiple walls in both directions (muriform), measure 63–73 by 40–46 μm, and feature 10–15 cross walls (transverse septa) and 5–7 longitudinal walls (longisepta) in the central part.

== Habitat and distribution ==
Atla tibelliorum has been documented in both northern Europe and North America in specific alpine and arctic environments. In northwestern Finland, this lichen species has been found growing on dolomite pebbles in fell regions, specifically in alpine grassland habitats adjacent to flat, exposed dolomite rock formations. The Toskalharji area, where specimens have been collected, represents Finland's largest expanse of calcareous rock and serves as home to numerous rare lichen species. Within Finland, A. tibelliorum appears to be extremely uncommon.

The species has also been identified in North America, where it was collected from dwarf shrub tundra in the Franklin Bluffs region of Alaska. This particular specimen was found growing in highly alkaline soil with a pH of 8.0, suggesting the species has a preference for calcareous or base-rich substrates. This habitat preference is consistent with its occurrence on dolomite in Finland, as both environments provide the alkaline conditions that appear to favour this rare lichen species.
