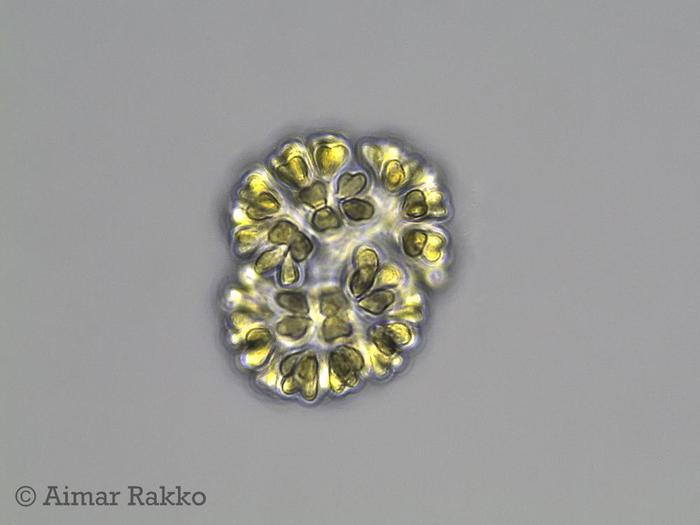
- Gomphosphaeria aponina

Scientific classification
- Domain: Bacteria
- Phylum: Cyanobacteria
- Class: Cyanophyceae
- Order: Chroococcales
- Family: Gomphosphaeriaceae; Elenkin

Genera
- Beckia Richter 1882; Gomphosphaeria Kützing 1836

= Gomphosphaeriaceae =

Family of bacteria

Gomphosphaeriaceae is a family of cyanobacteria.
