= Atla vitikainenii =

Scientific classification
- Kingdom: Fungi
- Division: Ascomycota
- Class: Eurotiomycetes
- Order: Verrucariales
- Family: Verrucariaceae
- Genus: Atla
- Species: A. vitikainenii

Binomial name
- Atla vitikainenii Pykälä & Myllys (2016)
- Holotype: Oulanka National Park, Finland

Species of lichen

Atla vitikainenii is a species of saxicolous (rock-dwelling) crustose lichen in the family Verrucariaceae. First described in 2016, it is characterised by its thin, variably coloured thallus and distinctive reproductive structures that are partially embedded in the lichen body. It appears to be a primarily northern species with a restricted distribution, having been documented from only four specimens found growing on dolomite surfaces in the Kilpisjärvi and Oulanka areas of northern Finland. The populations in the Oulanka area may represent relicts from earlier, colder climatic periods.

== Taxonomy ==
The lichen was formally described as a new species in 2016 by Juha Pykälä and Leena Myllys. The type specimen was collected by the first author from Oulanka National Park (Salla, Koillismaa), at an elevation of 185 m (607 ft); there, it was found growing on pebbles in a northeast-facing dolomite rock outcrop. The species epithet honours Finnish lichenologist Orvo Vitikainen, who, according to the authors, "has contributed in many ways to our knowledge of the taxonomy, ecology and biogeography of Finnish lichens".

== Description ==
Atla vitikainenii is a crustose lichen species with a thin body (thallus) that appears either continuous, fleck-like, or occasionally showing slight cracking patterns. The thallus can vary in colour, ranging from grey, ochre, pale green to dark brown, and measures about 20–100 micrometres (μm) in thickness. Like all lichens, it forms a symbiotic relationship with an algal partner (photobiont) – in this case, a green alga with cells measuring about 5–7 μm in diameter.

The reproductive structures (perithecia) measure 0.25–0.46 mm in diameter and are partially embedded in the thallus, with one-quarter to three-quarters of their structure immersed in the lichen body. These perithecia may or may not leave shallow depressions in the substrate and are often thinly covered by thallus tissue except at their apex. They occur at a density of roughly 20–80 per square centimetre. The openings of the perithecia (ostioles) appear dark, are either flat or slightly depressed, and measure 20–80 μm across.

The internal anatomy includes an involucrellum (a protective outer layer of the perithecium) that extends to the base level of the exciple (inner wall). This layer measures 50–100 μm in thickness and is either pressed against the exciple or slightly diverging from it. The exciple itself measures 0.25–0.38 mm in diameter, with a wall ranging from pale to dark brown and 25–34 μm thick. Inside, sterile filaments called periphysoids measure approximately 44–54 by 1.5–2.5 μm and exhibit branching.

The spore-producing sacs (asci) are about 150 by 63 μm in size and contain 8 spores each. The dark brown spores have multiple internal partitions (septa) in both directions (muriform) and typically measure 54–64 μm long by 26–30 μm wide, though they can range from 40–70 by 25–33 μm. These spores feature 12–16 cross walls (transverse septa) reaching the edge along one side when viewed in cross-section, and 4–6 longitudinal walls (longisepta) in the central part. A distinctive characteristic is that the spores are often curved or bent, and older spores readily break into two pieces.

== Habitat and Ddistribution ==
At the time of its original publication, Atla vitikainenii was documented from just four specimens, three of which have undergone genetic sequencing. Three of these specimens were found growing on dolomite pebbles, while one was collected from a larger dolomite boulder. The species has been observed in only two locations in northern Finland: the Kilpisjärvi and Oulanka areas, which represent the only regions in northern Finland containing significant clusters of calcareous rock formations.

This lichen appears to be primarily a northern species, with a distribution likely centred in arctic regions and northern mountainous areas above the alpine tree line. The populations discovered in the Oulanka area may represent relict populations—surviving remnants from earlier, colder climatic periods. This pattern is consistent with other biological distributions in the Oulanka region, which hosts numerous northern and arctic-alpine lichen and plant species believed to be relicts persisting from past glacial periods when the climate was significantly colder.
