= Giovanni Battista de Toni =

Italian botanist (1864–1924)

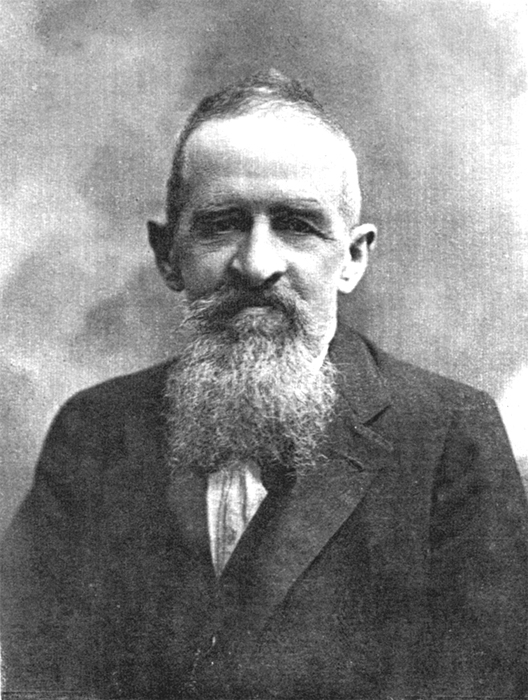
- Born: January 2, 1864; Venice, Italy
- Died: July 31, 1924 (aged 60); Modena, Italy
- Education: University of Padua
- Known for: Scientific works on the taxonomy of plants, algae and fungi
- Scientific career
- Fields: Mycology, botany, phycology, taxonomy
- Workplaces: University of Camerino, University of Modena and Reggio Emilia

Giovanni Battista de Toni (2 January 1864, Venice – 31 July 1924, Modena) was an Italian botanist, mycologist and phycologist.

In 1885 he graduated from the University of Padua, where he studied natural sciences and chemistry with Pier Andrea Saccardo (1845–1920) and Francesco Filippuzzi (1824–1886). For several years, he worked as a librarian in the museum of Padua, afterwards teaching botany at the University of Camerino (1900). Following duties as a professor of botany in Sassari, he relocated to Modena, where from 1903, he served as a professor of botany and as associate director of the botanical garden. During his career, he took numerous scientific trips throughout Europe — travels where he met and studied with scientists that included Jacob Georg Agardh (1813–1901), Alfred Mathieu Giard (1846–1908), Louis Mangin (1852–1937) and Narcisse Théophile Patouillard (1854–1926). He issued the exsiccata work Phycotheca Italica, collezione di alghe Italiane (1886–1889, with David Levi as co-editor) and the series Herbarium Phycologicum, collab. P. Hennings, G. Lagerheim, I. Strafforello (1896).

His earlier work dealt mainly with plant systematics, his later research involved studies in the fields of phytophysiology and phytogeography. In 1889 he began work on "Sylloge algarum omnium hucusque cognitarum", a massive project that was an index of all known algae. In collaboration with Saccardo, he made important contributions to "Sylloge Fungorum hucusque cognitorum" (index of fungi). As a naturalist-historian, he published a work on Leonardo da Vinci, titled "Le piante e gli animali in Leonardo da Vinci" (The plants and animals in (the works of) Leonardo da Vinci).

From 1890, he was editor of the journal "La Nuova Notarisia", a quarterly magazine dedicated to the study of algae.

He was honoured in 1894, in the naming of Detonula, which is a genus of diatoms belonging to the family Thalassiosiraceae. He was also honoured 1934, in Johannesbaptistia is a genus of brackish–freshwater cyanobacteria.
