= Xenococcaceae =

Scientific classification
- Domain: Bacteria
- Phylum: Cyanobacteria
- Class: Cyanophyceae
- Order: Chroococcales
- Family: Xenococcaceae; Ercegović

Genera
- Xenococcus Thuret 1880; Xenotholos Gold-Morgan et al. 1994

Family of bacteria

The Xenococcaceae are a family of cyanobacteria.
