= Hyellaceae =

Scientific classification
- Domain: Bacteria
- Kingdom: Bacillati
- Phylum: Cyanobacteriota
- Class: Cyanophyceae
- Order: Chroococcales
- Family: Hyellaceae; Borzi

Genera
- Chamaecalyx Komárek & Anagnostidis 1986; Chroococcidium Geitler 1933; Chroococcopsis Geitler 1925; Cyanoderma Weber van Bosse 1887; Cyanosaccus Lukas & Golubić 1981; Ercegovicia DeToni 1936; Hyella Bornet & Flahault 1888; Myxosarcina Printz 1921; Pascherinema DeToni 1936; Pleurocapsa Thuret in Hauck 1885; Podocapsa Ercegović 1931; Radaisia Sauvageau 1895; Solentia Ercegović 1927

Synonyms
- Pleurocapsaceae Geitler

Family of bacteria

Hyellaceae is a family of cyanobacteria.

The genus name of Hyella is in honour of Félix Charles Hy (1853-1918), who was a French clergyman and botanist (mycology, algology and bryology).
