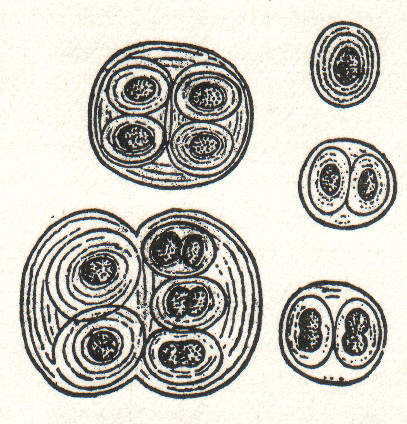
- Gloecapsa

Scientific classification
- Domain: Bacteria
- Kingdom: Bacillati
- Clade: "Cyanobacteria/Melainabacteria clade"
- Phylum: Cyanobacteria
- Class: Cyanophyceae
- Order: Chroococcales
- Family: Chroococcaceae
- Genus: Gloeocapsa; Kützing, 1843

Species
- Gloeocapsa acervata Gloeocapsa alpicola Gloeocapsa africana Gloeocapsa arenaria Gloeocapsa attingens Gloeocapsa aurata Gloeocapsa alpina Gloeocapsa aeruginosa Gloeocapsa atrata Gloeocapsa ampla Gloeocapsa bahamensis Gloeocapsa bituminosa Gloeocapsa biformis Gloeocapsa botryoides Gloeocapsa caldariorum Gloeocapsa calcicola Gloeocapsa calcarea Gloeocapsa cartilaginea Gloeocapsa compacta Gloeocapsa conglomerata Gloeocapsa conspicua Gloeocapsa coracina Gloeocapsa cryptococcoides Gloeocapsa crepidinum Gloeocapsa dermochroa Gloeocapsa dispersa Gloeocapsa dirumpens Gloeocapsa didyma Gloeocapsa decorticans Gloeocapsa docorticans Gloeocapsa endocodia Gloeocapsa gigas Gloeocapsa geminata Gloeocapsa gelatinosa Gloeocapsa granosa Gloeocapsa haematodes Gloeocapsa holstii Gloeocapsa ianthina Gloeocapsa insignis Gloeocapsa incrustata Gloeocapsa livida Gloeocapsa juliana Gloeocapsa kuetzingiana Gloeocapsa luteofusca Gloeocapsa mellea Gloeocapsa magma Gloeocapsa membranina Gloeocapsa minutula Gloeocapsa multisphaerica Gloeocapsa myxophila Gloeocapsa montana Gloeocapsa monococca Gloeocapsa nigrescens Gloeocapsa nigra Gloeocapsa ocellata Gloeocapsa ovalis Gloeocapsa opaca Gloeocapsa palmelloides Gloeocapsa paroliniana Gloeocapsa punctata Gloeocapsa planctonica Gloeocapsa polydermatica Gloeocapsa purpurea Gloeocapsa quaternata Gloeocapsa quarternata Gloeocapsa ralfsii Gloeocapsa ralfsiana Gloeocapsa reicheltii Gloeocapsa rupicola Gloeocapsa rosea Gloeocapsa rubicunda Gloeocapsa rupestris Gloeocapsa sabulosa Gloeocapsa sanguinea Gloeocapsa stillicidiorum Gloeocapsa salina Gloeocapsa sanguinolenta Gloeocapsa saxicola Gloeocapsa scopulorum Gloeocapsa siderochlamys Gloeocapsa sparsa Gloeocapsa stegophila Gloeocapsa sphaerica Gloeocapsa shuttleworthiana Gloeocapsa squamulosa Gloeocapsa subulosa Gloeocapsa thermalis Gloeocapsa tornensis Gloeocapsa tropica Gloeocapsa violacea Gloeocapsa versicolor Gloeocapsa zostericola

= Gloeocapsa =

Genus of bacteria

Gloeocapsa (from the Greek gloia (gelatinous) and the Latin capsa (case)) is a genus of cyanobacteria. The cells secrete individual gelatinous sheaths which can often be seen as sheaths around recently divided cells within outer sheaths. Recently divided cell pairs often appear to be only one cell since the new cells cohere temporarily. They are also known as glow caps, a term derived from the yellowish hue given off by the cap.

== Occurrence ==
Some species of this genus are halophiles and hence found in hypersaline lakes and other high salinity environments. An example of such occurrence of the genus is in the Makgadikgadi Pans of Botswana. Gloeocapsa magma is noted for colonising roof shingles in the United States and Canada. Fossilized Gloeocapsa have been dated from as early as 1.5 billion years ago, found in the Ural mountains in Russia.
