= Hydrococcaceae =

Scientific classification
- Domain: Bacteria
- Phylum: Cyanobacteria
- Class: Cyanophyceae
- Order: Chroococcales
- Family: Hydrococcaceae; Kützing

Genera
- Dalmatella Ercegović 1929; Hormathonema Ercegović 1929; Hydrococcus Kützing 1833; Myxohyella Geitler 1925; Onkonema Geitler 1933; Tryponema Ercegović 1929

Family of bacteria

The Hydrococcaceae are a family of cyanobacteria.
