= Johannesbaptistia =

Scientific classification
- Domain: Bacteria
- Phylum: Cyanobacteria
- Class: Cyanophyceae
- Order: Chroococcales
- Family: Cyanothrichaceae; Elenkin in Kiselev
- Genus: Johannesbaptistia; DeToni 1934

Type species
- Johannesbaptistia pellucida

Synonyms
- Cyanothrix

Genus of bacteria

Johannesbaptistia is a genus of brackish–freshwater cyanobacteria which has a very characteristic morphology. It is the only member of the family Cyanothrichaceae. When the name was changed from Cyanothrix to Johannesbaptistia (due to the rules of priority in the International Code of Nomenclature for algae, fungi, and plants), the family name was not changed.

The genus name of Johannesbaptistia is in honour of Giovanni Battista de Toni (1864–1924), who was an Italian botanist, mycologist and phycologist.
