= Atla praetermissa =

Scientific classification
- Kingdom: Fungi
- Division: Ascomycota
- Class: Eurotiomycetes
- Order: Verrucariales
- Family: Verrucariaceae
- Genus: Atla
- Species: A. praetermissa

Binomial name
- Atla praetermissa Savić & Tibell (2008)
- Holotype: Härjedalen, Sweden

Species of lichen

Atla praetermissa is a species of saxicolous (rock-dwelling) crustose lichen in the family Verrucariaceae. It forms a very thin, mesh-like thallus that varies in colour from grey to dark green, sometimes with a brownish tint. The species is characterised by small, spherical reproductive structures and hyaline spores with a distinctive internal wall structure. First described in 2008, this lichen grows specifically on calcareous rocks near streams and in waterfall spray zones at elevations between 165 and 955 metres. Although known only from Scandinavia (Sweden and Norway), experts suggest it may have a wider distribution but remains overlooked due to its inconspicuous nature and specialised habitat requirements.

== Taxonomy ==
The lichen was formally described as a new species in 2008 by Sanja Savić and Leif Tibell. The type specimen was collected in 2006 by Savić (collection number 3284) from Anderssjöåfallet, located 1.5 kilometres northwest of Hamra in the Funäsdalen parish, Härjedalen province, Sweden. This holotype is preserved in the herbarium of Uppsala University (UPS).

Molecular analysis published in 2016 suggests that Atla recondita is the closest relative to A. praetermissa.

== Description ==
Atla praetermissa forms a superficial, crustose (crust-like) thallus that is very thin and has a mesh-like appearance, sometimes becoming more confluent (merging together) around the reproductive structures. The thallus varies in colour from grey to dark green, occasionally showing a brownish tint. The photobiont (the photosynthetic partner in the lichen symbiosis) is an unidentified green alga. The reproductive structures, called perithecia, are relatively small, averaging 0.36 mm in diameter, and are almost spherical in shape. These structures are adnate (attached) at the base but lack a thalline cover (a layer of thallus tissue covering the reproductive structure).

The internal anatomy of A. praetermissa includes a well-developed involucrellum (a protective outer layer) that is about 35–55 μm thick. This structure extends almost to the base of the perithecium, where it diverges from the excipulum (the outer wall of the fruiting body). The outermost layer of the involucrellum is 18–25 μm thick and black in colour, while the interior portion is dark brown and composed of irregularly intertwined, heavily sclerotised (hardened) cells.

The excipulum itself is uniformly brown and consists of narrow cells measuring 11–15 by 2–4 μm, arranged in a concentric pattern. The hamathecium (the sterile tissue within the fruiting body) lacks hyphal elements except for pseudoparaphyses (sterile filaments) that form below the ostiolum (opening). These pseudoparaphyses are slender, measuring 1.5–2 μm in diameter, septate (divided by cross-walls), and branch at wide angles.

The mature asci (spore-producing structures) lack apical thickening, measure 113–133 by 39–55 μm, and have an ellipsoidal to club-shaped form. Each ascus contains eight spores. The ascospores are narrowly ellipsoidal, often asymmetrical with one end slightly widened, and measure 44.7–49.2 by 19.0-22.4 μm. When mature, they are hyaline (colourless and transparent) with a muriform structure (divided by both transverse and longitudinal walls). They typically have 8–11 transverse walls that reach the periphery along one side of the spores when viewed in a median optical section, and 2–4 longitudinal walls in the central part.

== Habitat and distribution ==
Atla praetermissa grows on calcareous rocks near streams and in the spray zones of waterfalls. It has been found at elevations ranging from 165 to 955 m (541 to 3,133 ft) above sea level. While currently documented only from Scandinavia (Sweden and Norway), the species may have a wider distribution but has likely been overlooked in other regions due to its inconspicuous nature and specialised habitat requirements.
