= Atla recondita =

Scientific classification
- Kingdom: Fungi
- Division: Ascomycota
- Class: Eurotiomycetes
- Order: Verrucariales
- Family: Verrucariaceae
- Genus: Atla
- Species: A. recondita

Binomial name
- Atla recondita S.Tibell & Tibell (2015)
- Holotype: Härjedalen, Sweden

Species of lichen

Atla recondita is a rare alpine species of saxicolous (rock-dwelling), crustose lichen in the family Verrucariaceae. It occurs in the central Scandes mountain range in Sweden. The lichen has a thin olive brown-coloured thallus and ascospores with 9–15 transverse septa and 3–4 longitudinal septa. It is not possible to distinguish this species from the similar Polyblastia by morphology alone.

== Taxonomy ==
It was formally described as new to science in 2015 by Sanja and Leif Tibell. The type specimen was collected from Hamrafjället (Härjedalen Municipality) at an altitude of 1,075 m (3,527 ft); there, it was found growing on calciferous rocks. It is known only from a few locations in this area.

Molecular analysis published in 2016 suggests that Atla praetermissa is the closest relative to A. recondita.

== Description ==
Atla recondita has a superficial, thin, ochre-coloured body (thallus). The reproductive structures (perithecia) are medium-sized, black, and somewhat spherical, measuring 0.28–0.37 mm in diameter with a depressed opening (ostiolum). These structures sit directly on the surface rather than being embedded.

The protective outer layer (involucrellum) of the perithecia is about 42–80 μm thick, wider around the opening and gradually thinning toward the base, with a blackish-brown coloration. The inner layer (excipulum) blends indistinctly with the outer layer, appearing pale in the upper portion and light brown at the base where it measures 15–19 μm thick.

The internal fertile tissue (hamathecium) lacks typical filamentous elements except for slender, branching structures (pseudoparaphyses) that form below the opening. These structures measure 28–48 μm in length and 1.5 μm in diameter, with cross-walls (septa) and limited branching at their tips. When tested with iodine (I) or potassium iodide (KI), the gel in the fertile tissue turns red or blue respectively, though the pseudoparaphyses themselves do not react.

The spore-containing sacs (asci) measure 71–127 by 33–70 μm, are elliptical to club-shaped, and each contains eight spores. The spores (ascospores) measure 41.3–48.7 by 19.1–22.6 μm, are colourless or pale yellowish, elliptical, and divided into multiple compartments (muriform). In cross-section, they show 9–15 transverse walls (transsepta) reaching the edge along one side, and 3–4 longitudinal walls (longisepta) in the central part. The photosynthetic partner (photobiont) is an unidentified green alga measuring 8.0–9.5 μm in diameter. The blue-green algae Stigonema and other cyanobacteria are also frequently found associated with Atla recondita, possibly forming additional symbiotic relationships.

== Habitat and distribution ==
Atla recondita grows on calcium-rich rocks in exposed locations alongside streams and rivers. It is found at elevations between 610 and 1,075 m (2,001 and 3,527 ft) above sea level. This appears to be an uncommon alpine species that has, as of its original publication date, only been documented in Härjedalen, a province located in the central region of the Scandinavian Mountains (Scandes).
