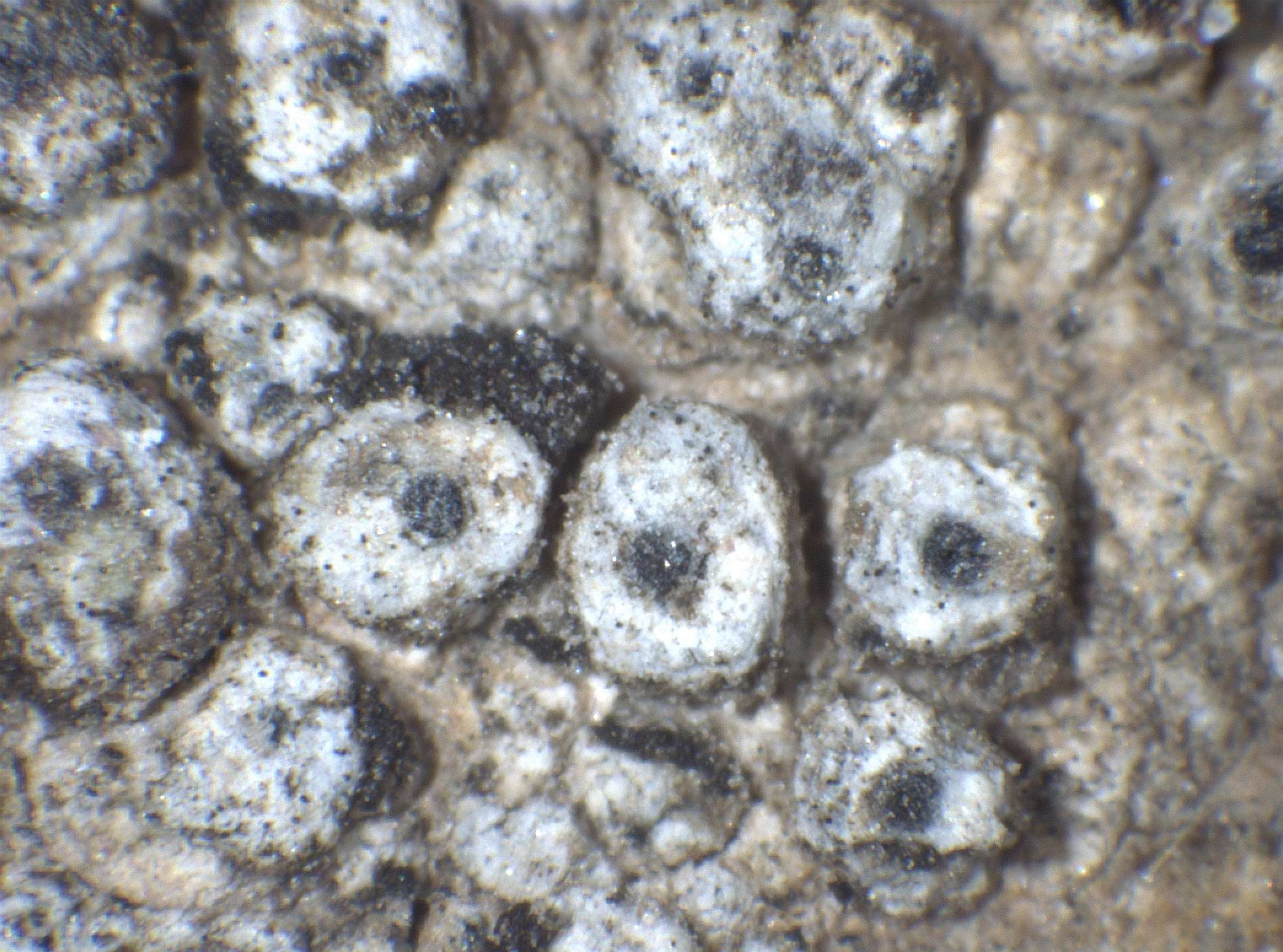
- Atla alpina

Scientific classification
- Domain: Eukaryota
- Kingdom: Fungi
- Division: Ascomycota
- Class: Eurotiomycetes
- Order: Verrucariales
- Family: Verrucariaceae
- Genus: Atla; Savić & Tibell (2008)

Type species
- Atla alpina Savić & Tibell (2008)

= Atla (lichen) =

Genus of lichens

Atla is a genus of crustose lichens in the family Verrucariaceae. It has nine species that grow on rocks or on soil.

== Taxonomy ==
The genus was circumscribed in 2008 by Sanja Savić and Leif Tibell, with Atla alpina assigned as the type species. According to the authors, the generic name Atla refers to "the name of a Norse water goddess who sometimes accompanied us in the same habitats as the species named after her." Three species were included in the original circumscription of the genus; these species formed a well-defined clade in the family Verrucariaceae, sister to a clade containing several Sporodictyon species. Several newly described species were later added from Alaska and Finland.

== Description ==
Atla lichens have crustose thalli that are blackish in colour with a surface texture ranging from warty (verrucose) to diffusely areolate to immersed in the substrate. The perithecia are 0.3–0.9 mm in diameter, and either sessile or immersed. Ascospores are ellipsoid, hyaline to dark brown when mature, and measure 43–87 by 19–49 μm; the spores are muriform (divided into compartments), with 7–15 transverse and 2–5 longitudinal walls. The excipulum (the ring-shaped layer surrounding the hymenium) is spherical, ranging in colour from black to dark brown. The involucrellum (the upper, often exposed covering or cap external to the excipulum) is well developed; depending on the species, the upper part of this structure is either fused together with the excipulum, or missing altogether.

== Species ==
- Atla alaskana S.Tibell & Tibell (2015) – Alaska
- Atla alpina Savić & Tibell (2008) – Europe
- Atla oulankaensis Pykälä & Myllys (2016) – Finland
- Atla palicei Savić & Tibell (2008) – Sweden
- Atla praetermissa Savić & Tibell (2008) – Scandinavia
- Atla recondita S.Tibell & Tibell (2015) – Sweden
- Atla tibelliorum Pykälä & Myllys (2016) – Finland
- Atla vitikainenii Pykälä & Myllys (2016) – Finland
- Atla wheldonii (Travis) Savić & Tibell (2008) – Europe
