= Radaisia =

Scientific classification
- Domain: Bacteria
- Phylum: Cyanobacteria
- Class: Cyanophyceae
- Order: Chroococcales
- Family: Hyellaceae
- Genus: Radaisia; Sauvageau, 1895

Species
- See text

Genus of bacteria

Radaisia is a genus of coccoid cyanobacterium comprising about 10 identified species. It is a colonial cyanobacterium, the bacteria initially forming a round to irregularly shaped flat group of gelatinous or crustose cells attached to the substrate from which arise rows of pseudofilamentous cells in mucilaginous sheaths perpendicular to the initial colony. Apical cells of the pseodofilamentous sheaths are elongate compared to proximal cells in the sheath. Cell division in the genus is notably irregular, although usually perpendicular to the axis in the pseudofilament. The cells are light blue-green to reddish purple in color.

== Species ==
Some species currently in this genus include:

- R. clavata
- R. confluens
- R. epiphytica
- R. gardneri
- R. gomontiana
- R. pusilla
- R. violacea
- R. willei
