= Detonula =

Scientific classification
- Domain: Eukaryota
- Clade: Diaphoretickes
- Clade: SAR
- Clade: Stramenopiles
- Phylum: Gyrista
- Subphylum: Ochrophytina
- Class: Bacillariophyceae
- Order: Thalassiosirales
- Family: Thalassiosiraceae
- Genus: Detonula; F.Schütt ex De Toni, 1894

Genus of algae

Detonula is a genus of diatoms belonging to the family Thalassiosiraceae.

The genus name of Detonula is in honour of Giovanni Battista de Toni (1864–1924), who was an Italian botanist, mycologist and phycologist.

The genus was circumscribed by Franz Schütt ex Giovanni Battista De Toni in Syll. Algarum Vol.2 on page 1425 in 1894.

== Species ==
As of 2021;:

- Detonula confervacea (Cleve) Gran
- Detonula cystifera Gran
- Detonula delicatula (H.Peragallo) Gran
- Detonula moseleyana (Castracane) H.H.Gran
- Detonula pumila (Castracane) Gran
- Detonula schroederi Gran
- Detonula subtilissima Proshkina-Lavrenko
