= Stichosiphonaceae =

Scientific classification
- Domain: Bacteria
- Phylum: Cyanobacteria
- Class: Cyanophyceae
- Order: Chroococcales
- Family: Stichosiphonaceae; Hoffmann, Komárek, & Kaštovský

Genera
- Godlewskia Janczewski 1883; Stichosiphon Geitler 1932

Family of bacteria

Stichosiphonaceae is a family of cyanobacteria.
