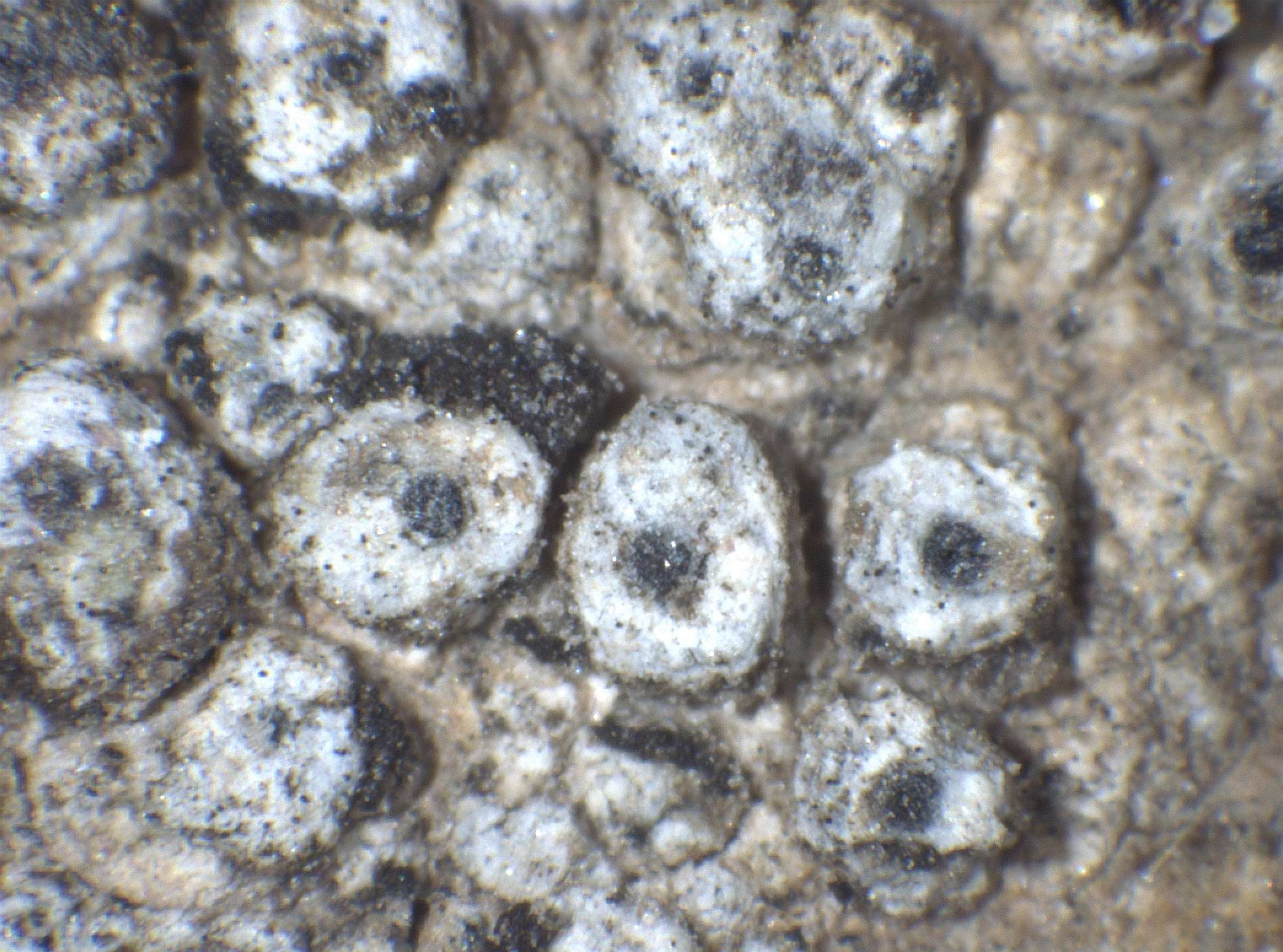

Scientific classification
- Domain: Eukaryota
- Kingdom: Fungi
- Division: Ascomycota
- Class: Eurotiomycetes
- Order: Verrucariales
- Family: Verrucariaceae
- Genus: Atla
- Species: A. alpina

Binomial name
- Atla alpina Savić & Tibell (2008)

= Atla alpina =

Species of lichen

Atla alpina is a species of saxicolous (rock-dwelling), crustose lichen in the family Verrucariaceae, and the type species of the genus Atla. Found in Europe, it was formally described as a new species in 2008 by Sanja Savić and Leif Tibell. The type specimen was collected near Djupdalsvallen (Mittåkläppen, Härjedalen, Sweden) at an altitude of 1,170 m (3,840 ft), where it was found growing on northwest-facing, vertical slate rocks. In addition to Sweden, the lichen has been recorded from Scandinavia, Spitsbergen, Novaya Zemlya, Austria, and Germany, at elevations ranging from 345 to 2,700 m (1,132 to 8,858 ft).

== Description ==
Atla alpina is a crustose lichen characterized by a thin thallus (the main body of the lichen) that forms minute areoles measuring 0.4–0.6 mm wide. These areoles have irregular, slightly uneven surfaces, ranging in colour from grey to dark greenish grey. The thallus sometimes appears minutely granular, thin, and matt, or it may be partly immersed in its substrate, emerging only as blackish green patches. The primary photobiont is an unidentified green alga, while small, almost black colonies of the cyanobacterium Nostoc are frequently found associated with the thallus, suggesting they may also participate in the symbiotic relationship.

The reproductive structures, perithecia, are relatively large (0.71–0.87 mm in diameter), shiny black, and almost spherical. They are adnate and broadly connected at the base without a thalline covering. The involucrellum (outer protective layer) is thick, measuring approximately 80–120 μm, with a strongly carbonized black outer layer. The excipulum (inner wall) is 15–25 μm thick, brown, and composed of narrow, concentrically arranged cells that become paler in the lowermost part.

Mature asci lack apical thickening and measure 153–178 μm by 70–112 μm, containing eight spores each. The ascospores are large (70.1–83.0 μm by 39.1–49.0 μm), broadly ellipsoidal, and very dark brown when mature. They have a muriform structure with 7–8 transverse walls and 3–4 longitudinal walls in the central part. When treated with iodine, the gel stains red, and with potassium iodide, it turns blue.
