= Dermocarpellaceae =

Scientific classification
- Domain: Bacteria
- Phylum: Cyanobacteria
- Class: Cyanophyceae
- Order: Chroococcales
- Family: Dermocarpellaceae; Ginsburg-Ardré ex Christensen

Genera
- Cyanocystis Borzì 1882; Dermocarpella Lemmermann 1907; Stanieria Komárek & Anagnostidis 1986

Family of bacteria

The Dermocarpellaceae are a family of cyanobacteria.
