= Cyanobacterium (genus) =

Scientific classification
- Domain: Bacteria
- Kingdom: Bacillati
- Phylum: Cyanobacteriota
- Class: Cyanophyceae
- Order: Chroococcales
- Family: Cyanobacteriaceae; Komárek et al. 2014
- Genus: Cyanobacterium; Rippka & Cohen-Bazire 1983 [validated 2022]

Species
- Cyanobacterium stanieri; "Cyanobacterium aponinum"

Genus of cyanobacteria

Cyanobacterium is a genus of cyanobacteria. Unusual for cyanobacteria, it is published under the International Code of Nomenclature of Prokaryotes (with a living-culture type specimen). It became a validly published name in 2022.

It contains one validly-published species, the type species Cyanobacterium stanieri. There is an effectively (but not validly) published "Cyanobacterium aponinum" Moro et al. 2007.

GTDB splits Cyanobacterium stanieri into two species-sized clusters and reports three more unnamed species clusters in its understanding of Cyanobacterium. The "Cyanobacterium aponinum PCC 10605" RefSeq genome GCF_000317675.1 is assigned to different genus with a placeholder name, PCC-10605, under GTDB's version of Cyanobacteriaceae. GTDB's version of the Cyanobacteriaceae also includes Geminocystis and two more placeholder genera.
