= Atla alaskana =

Scientific classification
- Domain: Eukaryota
- Kingdom: Fungi
- Division: Ascomycota
- Class: Eurotiomycetes
- Order: Verrucariales
- Family: Verrucariaceae
- Genus: Atla
- Species: A. alaskana

Binomial name
- Atla alaskana S.Tibell & Tibell (2015)

Species of lichen

Atla alaskana is a species of saxicolous (rock-dwelling), crustose lichen in the family Verrucariaceae. Found in Alaska, it was formally described as a new species in 2015 by Sanja and Leif Tibell. The type specimen was collected from Sukakpak Mountain (Brooks Range) at an altitude of 776 m (2,546 ft); there, it was found growing on calciferous rock ledges in open dwarf shrub. The lichen has a thick, whitish-grey thallus with a granular to verrucose (warted) texture.
