= Louis Mangin =

French botanist

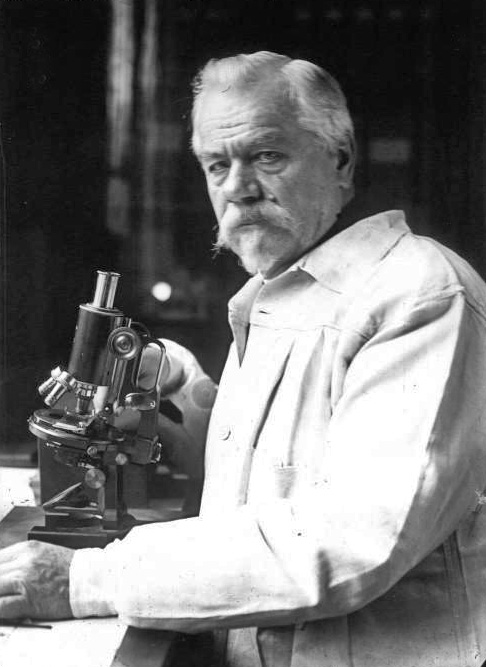
Louis Mangin (1852–1937)

Louis Alexandre Mangin (French pronunciation: [lwi alɛksɑ̃dʁ mɑ̃ʒɛ̃]; 8 September 1852, in Paris – 27 January 1937) was a French botanist and mycologist.

In 1873, he became an associate professor at the Lycée de Nancy, followed by a professorship at the Lycée Louis-le-Grand in Paris (1881–1904). During this time frame, he was also a lecturer on natural sciences at the Sorbonne (from 1890). From 1904 to 1931, he was a professor (Chaire de cryptogamie) at the Muséum national d'histoire naturelle, and was director of the museum from 1919 until his retirement in 1931. For several years he was director of the menagerie at the Jardin des Plantes (1920 to 1926).

Mangin was a member of the Académie des sciences, the Académie d'agriculture de France, the Académie des sciences coloniales and the Société mycologique de France.

His early research dealt largely with plant anatomy and physiology; his doctoral thesis involving the adventitious roots of monocotyledons. With Gaston Bonnier (1853–1922), he performed extensive research of plant respiration, transpiration and carbon assimilation. In the early 1890s he is credited with the discovery of callose, a fundamental substance found in the cell membrane of plants.

== Selected writings ==
- Thèses présentées à la Faculté des Sciences de Paris pour obtenir le grade de Docteur ès Sciences Naturelles, 1882.
- Recherches sur la respiration et la transpiration des végétaux, 1884 (with Gaston Bonnier).
- Observations sur la présence de la callose chez les Phanérogames 1892.
- Recherches anatomiques sur les peronosporees, 1895.
- Parasites végétaux des plantes cultivées. Céréales, plantes sarclées, plantes fourragéres et poragéres, 1914.
