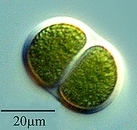
- Chroococcus

Scientific classification
- Domain: Bacteria
- Phylum: Cyanobacteria
- Class: Cyanophyceae
- Order: Chroococcales
- Family: Chroococcaceae; Nägeli

Genera
- Asterocapsa Chu 1952; Chalicogloea Roldán et al. 2013; Chondrocystis Lemmermann 1899; Chroogloeocystis Brown et al. 2005; Chroococcus Nägeli 1849; Cyanokybus Schiller 1956; Cyanosarcina Kováčik 1988; Cyanostylon Geitler 1928; Geminocystis Korelusová et al. 2009; Gloeocapsa Kützing 1843; Gloeocapsopsis Geitler ex Komárek 1993; Nephrococcus Li 1984; Pseudocapsa Ercegović 1925; Pseudoncobyrsa Geitler 1925; Stilocapsa

= Chroococcaceae =

Family of bacteria

Chroococcaceae is a family of cyanobacteria.
