= Franciscus Junius =

Franciscus Junius may refer to:

- Franciscus Junius (the elder) (1545–1602), theologian and Hebrew scholar
- Franciscus Junius (the younger) (1591–1677), theologian, art theorist and Germanic philologist, son of the above
