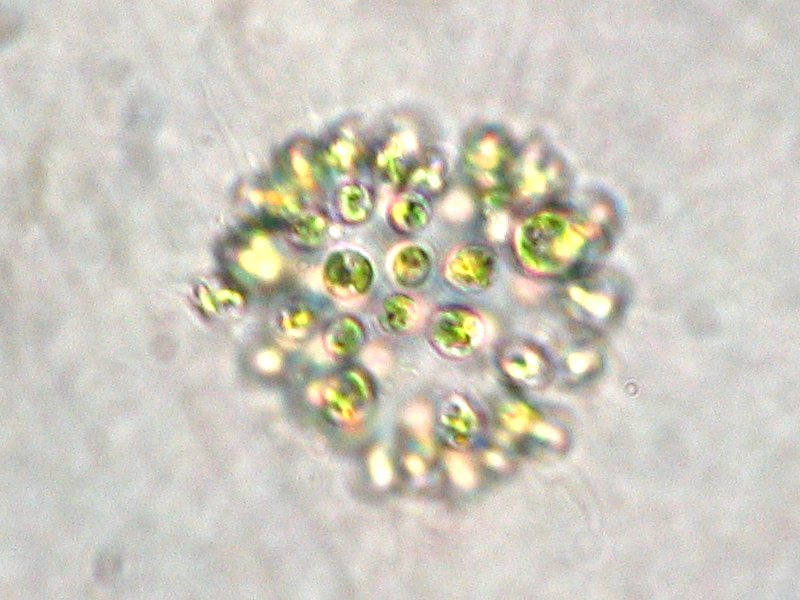
- Microcystis aeruginosa

Scientific classification
- Domain: Bacteria
- Kingdom: Bacillati
- Phylum: Cyanobacteriota
- Class: Cyanophyceae
- Order: Chroococcales von Wettstein von Westerheim

Families
- Aphanothecaceae Komárek et al. 2014; Chroococcaceae Nägeli; Cyanobacteriaceae Komárek et al. 2014; Cyanothrichaceae Elenkin in Kiselev; Entophysalidaceae Geitler; Gomphosphaeriaceae Elenkin; Microcystaceae Elenkin; Stichosiphonaceae Hoffmann, Komárek, & Kaštovský

= Chroococcales =

Order of bacteria

The Chroococcales (/ˌkroʊəˌkɒˈkeɪliːz/) are an order of cyanobacteria in some classifications which includes the harmful algal bloom Microcystis aeruginosa. Molecular data indicate that Chroococcales may be polyphyletic, meaning its members may not all belong to the same clade or have the same common ancestor.

== Characteristics ==
The order is characterized by single, floating cells or colonies which are embedded to a matrix. Also, a lack of differentiation between apical and basal structures exists.

== Prochlorales ==
A heterotypic synonym of Chroococcales is (order) Prochlorales Lewin, 1977, with type genus "Prochloron". Additional names of the same nature included:

- Division Prochlorophyta Lewin, 1976
- Class Prochlorophyceae Lewin, 1977
- Family Prochloraceae Lewin, 1977
- Chloroxybacteria Margulis & Schwartz, 1982
- Subdivision Prochlorobacteria Jeffrey 1982
- Division Prochlorophycota Shameel 2008

The assignment as a division/subdivision was based on a belief that because this class lack red and blue phycobilin pigments and have stacked thylakoids, they are so distinct from typical cyanobacteria as to warrant a high rank.

The four taxa with "Lewin 1977" became validly published names under the ICNP in 1986, as the revised version (ex Lewin 1977) Florenzano et al. 1986, by virtue of being published in Int. J. Syst. Bacteriol. with a description.

=== Ecology ===
They are an important component of photosynthetic picoplankton. These oligotrophic organisms are abundant in nutrient poor tropical waters and use a unique photosynthetic pigment, divinyl-chlorophyll, to absorb light and acquire energy.

=== Discovery and naming ===
This unique group of phytoplankton, with no phycobilin pigments, were initially found in 1975 near the Great Barrier Reef and off the coast of Mexico (Prochloron). Prochlorophyta was soon assigned as a new algal sub-class in 1976 by Ralph A. Lewin of the Scripps Institution of Oceanography. Other phytoplankton that lacked phycobilin pigments were later found in freshwater lakes in the Netherlands by Tineke Burger-Wiersma and colleagues and were termed Prochlorothrix (additional reading on Prochlorothrix can be found in a journal article by A.V. Pinevich ). In 1986 Prochlorococcus was found by Sallie W. (Penny) Chisholm and colleagues. Prochlorococcus may be responsible for a significant portion of the global primary production.

=== Morphology ===
Prochlorophytes are very small microbes generally between 0.2 and 2 μm (photosynthetic picoplankton). They morphologically resemble Cyanobacteria (formerly known as Blue Green Algae). Members of Prochlorophyta have been found as coccoid (spherical) (Coccus) shaped, as in Prochlorococcus, and as filaments, as in Prochlorothrix.
